= The Avenues, Harare =

- Neighborhood
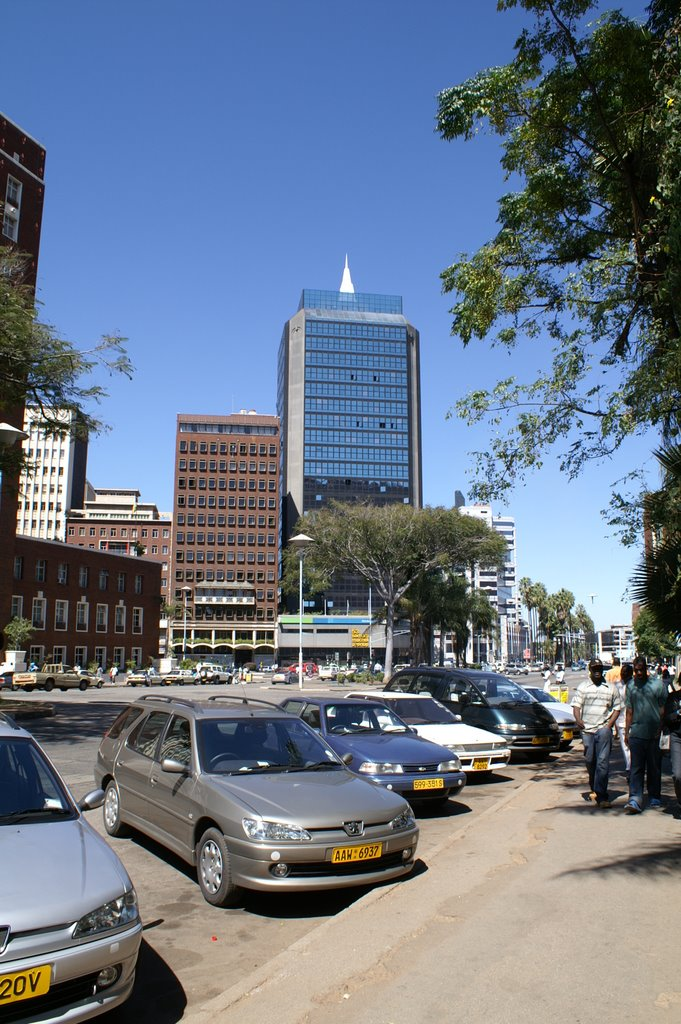
- The Avenues, Harare

- Location within Zimbabwe
- Coordinates: 17°49′15″S 31°02′57″E
- Country: Zimbabwe
- Province: Harare
- District: Harare
- Elevation: 1,490 m (4,890 ft)

Population (2012)
  - Total: 15,890
- estimated
- Time zone: UTC+2 (CAT)
  - Summer (DST): UTC+2 (not observed)

The Avenues is an inner city suburb in Harare, Zimbabwe. Known for its diversity and mixed use activities, the Avenues contains together residential, commercial and entertainment areas, and has a vibrant nightlife with numerous cafes, bars and restaurants. It also holds a busy stretch of shops, retail businesses and office space. As a distinct, named area, the Avenues came into being in the late 1950s, during the Federation, when it drew together several smaller neighbourhoods that were first developed in the early 20th century.

Since the 1950s the Avenues has been characterized by its diversity, with including immigrants, young families, and students, and it is also very popular with young professionals. Today the area is largely composed primarily of a mix of townhouses and midcentury mid-rise apartment buildings, many of which are now flats and condominiums; along with various commercial structures.

The suburb is laid out in the form of a rectangular grid, about 1 km to the north of the central business district. on the other side of the Harare Gardens.The area is traversed by all the major thoroughfares to the northern suburbs. These include Prince Edward Street (western boundary), Leopald Takawira Avenue, Sam Nujoma St (2nd Street), 4th Street, 7th Street (Borrowdale Rd). The streets run north to south and the mostly beautiful tree lined avenues run east to west. These divide the suburb into rectangular grids. Main avenues include J. Tongogara Avenue (Northern boundary), J. Chinamano Avenue, Chitepo Avenue, Central Avenue and the busy Samora Machel Avenue. Neighboring suburbs include Milton Park, Belgravia and Alexandra Park to the north, Belvedere to the west, Eastlea and Newlands to the east and the CBD to the south.

== Geography ==
The suburbs bordering the Avenues include:

North

Milton Park, Belgravia, Alexandra Park

East

Eastlea, Newlands

South

Central Business District

West

Belvedere

== History ==
Before the city of Harare was established in 1890, the area of today's neighborhood was home to the Shona-speaking, Zezuru people. In the 1890s, the area was subdivided into local tracts which sat just above the original planned City of Salisbury, and were either undeveloped or only lightly farmed. As the population expanded, this land was divided into several estates purchased by land companies such as the Salisbury Real Estate Co.

In the mid 20th century, the area was home to a range of people, from new immigrants, particularly those of Greek, Portuguese and Italian background, to white-collar professionals near the border with Belgravia and Alexandra Park, to blue-collar residents near the CBD. Residents comprised all classes and a mix of races, though segregated. After Independence in 1980, the area was formally desegregated, some whites abruptly left the area, other whites stayed and worked to integrate the neighbourhood, and many black and Asian people moved into the area. The neighbourhood, along with the city, was evolving. The area, with its less costly housing, also became home to some artists, students and social activists.

Since the 1990s, the Avenues has seen an influx of new residents, as more the area has become increasingly desirable. New housing is being constructed—some new infill-construction, some developments that use repurposed structures, and some new construction that is replacing older industrial buildings the area. Some of these new and redeveloped apartment buildings are being constructed along Fife Avenue. The new residents include a mix of young professionals and expat Zimbabweans due to its proximity to the CBD, its services, facilities and good transport links. Most residential units are apartment blocks or flats ranging from bedsitters to family sized apartments, garden flats, town houses to luxury apartments.

Since the 1980s, the Avenues also held a seedy reputation for being a red light district especially along J. Chinamano St and lower Fife Avenue. In response the city has been active in the community, with a goal to promote a clean, friendly and safe Avenues. It currently it sponsors local events and provides helpful information to the area residents and tourists.

== Cultural diversity ==
Along with its adjacent sister communities to the north and east, Eastlea and Milton Park, the Avenues has long has been a gateway community for immigrants. Since the 1960s, there was a predominant international presence in these communities, with the majority of immigrants coming from the United Kingdom, Ireland, Cyprus, Portugal, Italy and South Africa. Since the early 1980s, like other areas of the nation, the Avenues has seen a growing influx of immigrants from Malawi, Mozambique and the Democratic Republic of the Congo, as well. Gentrification and the resulting higher cost of housing, however, have displaced many immigrants and long-time working class, black African residents, particularly those with young children, as well as many small businesses, but the community still retains a degree of diversity, most evident in its array of international shops and restaurants.

The Avenues are also has become a thriving spot for nightlife, with several bars and clubs featuring live music. Dozens of establishments possess liquor licenses, putting it on level with other popular nightlife areas like Borrowdale and Avondale.

Despite the exodus of many long-term white and also black African residents from the Avenues because of the declining national economy and gentrification, the Avenues is a prime area for many young professionals and affluent, non-resident Zimbabweans. The Avenues is now mostly occupied by Black-Africans, but there are people of all races and various nationalities living there.

Another barometer of the enduring pull of the Avenues for immigrants and the young professionals is the linguistic and cultural diversity of its schools. Many of the families served live beyond the boundaries established for routine student enrollment; but have their children attend neighbourhood schools, especially Dominican Convent High School due to the quality of its education.

== Amenities ==
The Avenues is home to number of parks notably; The Harare Gardens and Greenwood Park as well as wide tree-lined avenues which colour the landscape lilac and purple every spring when in full bloom. Also the Avenues has a sprinkling of restaurants, guest houses, lodges and hotels such as the Bronte and Holiday Inn. There are also several smaller bed-and-breakfast lodgings in the area.

Avenues is a meeting spot for many groups, especially among young people who meet up on the weekends. The district is also a popular tourist destination. People from across Southern Africa, are often seen mixing with local residents doing their grocery shopping at Ximex Mall and professionals looking for a quick and affordable lunch. Also famous in the district is the Avenues street market that occurs each Saturday and Sunday, which offers tastes of traditional food and various household goods, wares and souvenirs. This well-known event attracts so many people from across the city.

== Education and health ==
The Avenues is home to numerous schools notably the Catholic, Dominican Convent High School and David Livingstone Primary School. The area also hosts a number of colleges such as Speciss College, Trust College, Ilsa College, some of the city's best rated clinics, the Avenues and West End Clinics.

== City politics ==
The Avenues is a part of Harare Central constituency in the Zimbabwean parliament, which along with the rest of the city is a stronghold for the social democratic Movement for Democratic Change (2018)

== See also ==
- Gentrification
