= Rugby union in Zimbabwe =

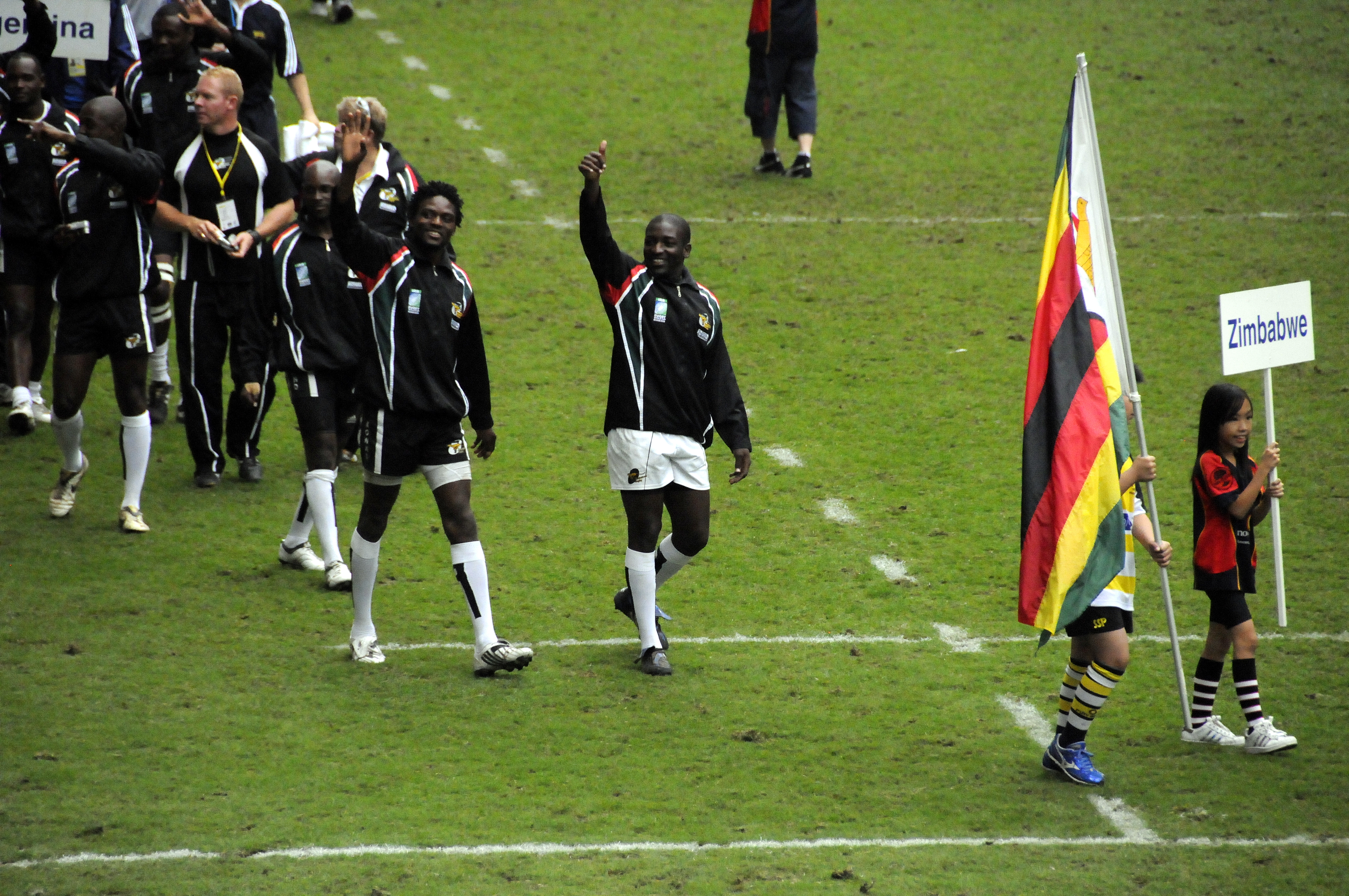
- Zimbabwe sevens rugby team at the 2009 Hong Kong Sevens
- Country: Zimbabwe
- Governing body: Zimbabwe Rugby Union
- National team: Zimbabwe
- Nickname: The Sables
- First played: 1890
- Registered players: 47,451
- Clubs: 17

National competitions
- Rugby World Cup; Africa Cup; Victoria Cup; Rugby World Cup Sevens; IRB Sevens World Series

Rugby union in Zimbabwe is a popular sport and ranks after association football and cricket as one of the oldest and most popular sports in the country. The Zimbabwe national team, commonly known as the Sables, have been playing international rugby since the early 1900s and have made appearances in two Rugby World Cups Zimbabwe at the Rugby World Cup on two occasions. As with rugby union in Namibia, the country's lack of a professional structure, and opportunity for player's to earn an income playing rugby, has been a problem for national organisers.

== Governing body ==
The Rhodesian Rugby Football Union was founded in 1895 and is based in Alexandra Park, Harare.

== History ==
The history of cricket and rugby were closely tied to the early development of the country and were the most central components of white settler sport culture. Cricket and rugby drew the small and scattered white population of Southern Rhodesia together and provided a link with the United Kingdom. More importantly, the two sports 'promoted imperial ideologies of the power of the British and of masculinity expressed through sporting prowess'. Through the political efforts of William Henry Milton and other early administrators, rugby governance became highly structured and was introduced to schools across the country.

From 1952, Rhodesian/Zimbabwean rugby was split into two subregions, centred on the two main cities, Harare (formerly "Salisbury" in the north) and Bulawayo in the south.

For a number of years, Rhodesia competed as a province in the B division of South Africa's Currie Cup.

Because of the boycott of the racist apartheid regime in South Africa, Zimbabwe was the only African side to be invited to the 1987 Rugby World Cup. It has subsequently qualified for the 1991 and 2027 tournaments.

As a result, unlike football, Zimbabwean rugby came to be seen as a white-dominated sport, with middle class appeal at best. This has created several weaknesses to the strength of the game, as the side relied upon South African competition for its development and was not able to achieve racial and class integration that it should have until after 1980. Another consistent issue is the sports concentration in expensive public and private schools, such as Prince Edward School and Peterhouse Boys School, making the sport largely inaccessible to the bulk of working-class parents and their children. Today the biggest challenge facing the sport today are finances and persistent emigration, as the lack of a professional setup has resulted in the most talented players seeking opportunity elsewhere, with many going on to play for the respective countries they ply their trade in.

Despite Namibia and Zimbabwe having qualified for the RWC at different times, both nations maintain close rugby ties with South Africa. Historically, Zimbabwe has produced numerous players who went on to represent South Africa, including Tendai Mtawarira, Gary Teichmann, Tonderai Chavanga and Ray Mordt. Regardless of these challenges, Zimbabwe continues to produce dozens of quality rugby players who compete internationally in leagues across England, Scotland, South Africa and Australia amongst others.

Zimbabwe competes in the Africa Cup and plays regularly against Namibia, Kenya and Madagascar, which serves as its main World Cup qualifying tournament as well as on the international rugby sevens circuit.

== Popularity ==
There are over 50,123 registered rugby union players in Zimbabwe, with more than 180 high schools and clubs across the country. Participation rates for rugby grew significantly between the national team's participation in their first ever world cup at the 1987 Rugby World Cup and the 1995 Rugby World Cup in nearby South Africa. Participation cooled off during the 2000s, however a spate of recent victories under former coach Liam Middleton has seen the team rise again. Rugby union gets moderate media coverage, often peaking in World Cup years, compared to more popular team sports such as association football and cricket.

There are pockets where rugby is particularly popular, such as the city of Harare and the Mashonaland East region, especially Marondera with its high quality boarding schools. In addition, rugby seven tournaments often feature festive atmosphere and attract sell-out crowds.

The union and national sides are based in the northern suburb of Alexandra Park. Additionally the domestic Super Six Rugby League (SSRL) plays host to the country's leading rugby clubs – Old Johnnians, Old Georgians, Old Hararians and Old Miltonians among others. The Zimbabwe Rugby Academy, the national development side which plays in the second division of the Currie Cup restoring old ties to South African rugby, with a number of players featuring in South African Currie Cup and Super Rugby sides.

International rugby test matches tend to be hosted at Harare Sports Club, the Police Grounds and at Hartsfield in Bulawayo with a particularly strong rivalry with the Namibia national rugby union team. Tours by top teams are rare and almost always a sellout, highlighting the growing appeal of the game. Traditionally, the city hosted tours by the British & Irish Lions, Argentina and the All-Blacks on their respective tours of South Africa, however, this is no longer the case due to the end of traditional rugby tours and the Zimbabwe national rugby union team's decline in the international rugby rankings. Indeed, Wales were the last major country to tour Harare back in 1993.

High school teams such as Prince Edward School, St. George's College, St. John's College are generally of a high standard and many send their first XV sides to compete against well-known South Africa high schools during Craven Week or on tours to the United Kingdom. Unfortunately after high school, the best players tend to move on to South Africa or the UK, due to a lack of professionalism and greater educational and earning opportunities abroad, thus depleting the strength of rugby union in Zimbabwe. However, there is hope that the large Zimbabwean diaspora, particularly those in South Africa, Britain and New Zealand, can help revitalize the fortunes of the national squad, as is increasingly the case in football.

== Notable players ==
Because of the complex racial problems of Zimbabwe/Rhodesia and South Africa, most of the best-known players in the past were white. However, there has been a growing number of notable black Zimbabwean players such as Richard Tsimba and his younger brother Kennedy Tsimba, Bedford Chibima, Honeywell Nguruve, Tendai Mtawarira, Brian Mujati, Takudzwa Ngwenya and Tonderai Chavhanga. The Tsimba brothers were inducted together to the IRB Hall of Fame in 2012.

Other notable Zimbabwean/Rhodesian players include:

- Salty du Rand, lock, who played for Northern Transvaal, and captained the Springboks. He was capped 21 times for South Africa between 1949 and 1956. He lived and played in Rhodesia for many years.
- Andy McDonald
- Ray Mordt, winger, described by Danie Craven as "a wounded rhinoceros in the body of a man" played for Rhodesia and South Africa. He later went on to play rugby league.
- Ian Robertson, winger/fullback who played for Rhodesia and South Africa.
- Adrian Garvey, prop/hooker who played for Zimbabwe, Natal and South Africa during their longest winning streak of 1997-98 and their Tri-Nations Championship victory of 1998.
- Tendai Mtawarira, a.k.a. "the Beast", prop, played for South Africa, winning the World Cup with the Springboks in 2019. Played club rugby for the Sharks, is South Africa's most capped prop, and has played twice for the Barbarians.
- Brian Mujati, prop, Northampton Saints and South Africa.
- Takudzwa Ngwenya, wing, currently plays for the USA and Biarritz. One of the candidates for the unofficial title of "fastest player in modern rugby"—at least until the 2012 emergence of United States Sevens player Carlin Isles—he moved to the US at high school age.
- Tonderai Chavhanga, winger, another former candidate for "fastest player in modern rugby", Stormers and South Africa.
- RA van Schoor.
- Bobby Skinstad, flanker/number 8, was born in Bulawayo, played for the Stormers and South Africa, captaining the Springboks in 2003.
- Gary Teichmann, number 8, born in Gweru, played for the Sharks and captained South Africa during their longest winning streak in 1997-98 and their Tri-Nations Championship victory of 1998.
- David Curtis
- David Pocock, back-rower for Australia and Western Force, emigrated with his family from Zimbabwe when he was 14.
- Anthony Henniker-Gotley, former England captain, lived in Rhodesia, and played for police there.
- David Denton, plays flanker/No8 for Scotland.
- Thom Evans, fullback/winger, capped 10 times by Scotland.
- Piet Greyling grew up on a tobacco farm in Mashonaland before representing Rhodesia, the Free State, Northern Transvaal, Transvaal, and South Africa at flank.

== British Lions tours ==
The British Lions toured South Africa a number of times. Despite officially being South African tours, the Lions also played Rhodesia (as it was then). Later tours of the region were stopped until the 1990s, due to the controversy over playing Ian Smith's regime, and apartheid era South Africa.

- 1910 British Lions tour to South Africa
- 1924 British Lions tour to South Africa
- 1938 British Lions tour to South Africa
- 1955 British Lions tour to South Africa
- 1968 British Lions tour to South Africa
- 1974 British Lions tour to South Africa

== See also ==
- Zimbabwe national rugby union team
- Zimbabwe at the Rugby World Cup
