= List of botanical gardens in Zimbabwe =

Botanical gardens in Zimbabwe have collections consisting entirely of Zimbabwe native and endemic species; most have a collection that include plants from around the world. There are botanical gardens and arboreta in all states and territories of Zimbabwe, most are administered by local governments, some are privately owned.

- Ewanrigg Botanical Gardens, Harare, Zimbabwe
- National Botanic Garden (Zimbabwe), Harare
- University of Zimbabwe Botanic Garden, Harare
- Vumba Botanical Gardens, Mutare
