= FBC Bank =

Commercial bank in Zimbabwe

FBC Bank Limited
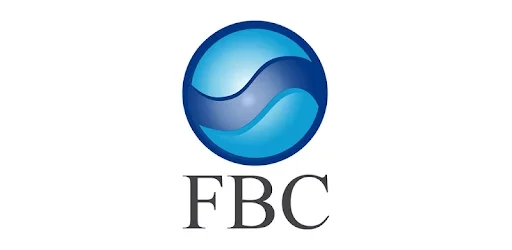
- Company type: Public
- Traded as: ZSE:FBC.ZW
- Industry: Financial services
- Founded: August 1997; 28 years ago
- Headquarters: Harare, Zimbabwe
- Key people: Morgan Nzwere; Chairman; Webster Rusere; Managing Director
- Products: Banking, Insurance, Investments, Mortgages
- Revenue: ▲ZWG$1.63b(2024)
- Number of employees: 519 (2022)
- Website: www.fbc.co.zw

FBC Bank, whose full name is FBC Bank Limited, is a commercial bank in Zimbabwe. It is licensed by the Reserve Bank of Zimbabwe, the central bank and national banking regulator.

== Location ==
The main branch and headquarters of the bank are located on the 6th Floor of the FBC Centre, at 45 Nelson Mandela Avenue, in Harare, the capital and largest city of Zimbabwe. The geographical coordinates of this bank's headquarters are: 17°49'46.7"S, 31°02'46.7"E (Latitude:-17.829639; Longitude:31.046306).

== Overview ==
As of December 2017, FBC Bank was a medium-sized banking institution, whose total asset valuation was US$558.1 million, and shareholder's equity of US$77.9 million. The bank is very active in the digital and mobile banking arena. This has become very pertinent in the current environment, where the country has adopted a multi-currency system; using the South African Rand, the US dollar, Euro and others.

FBC Bank is a 100% subsidiary of First Banking Corporation Holdings Limited, commonly known as FBC Holdings Limited, a publicly traded financial services company whose shares are listed on the Zimbabwe Stock Exchange, under the symbol: FBCH. The holding company owns subsidiaries, as depicted in the table below:

FBC Holdings Limited Subsidiaries
Rank	Name of Subsidiary	Asset Value	Core Capital	Notes
1	FBC Bank Limited	US$558.1 million	US$75.2 million	Commercial Bank
2	FBC Building Society	US$129.9 million	US$47.4 million	Building Society
3	Microplan Financial Services Limited	US$19.8 million	US$9.5 million	Microfinance Institution
4	FBC Securities Limited			Brokerage Services
5	FBC Reinsurance Limited			Reinsurance
	Total	US$712.4 million	US$144.2 million	

== History ==
The bank was established as First Banking Corporation Limited, in 1997. In 2004, the bank was wholly acquired by FBC Holdings Limited, a diversified financial services conglomerate involved in banking, insurance, brokerage, advisory and asset management. Following the acquisition, the bank rebranded to FBC Bank Limited.

== Ownership structure ==
The bank is a 100 percent subsidiary of FBC Holdings Limited. The investors in FBC Holdings were as listed in the table below, as of 31 December 2016.

Shareholding in FBC Holdings Limited
Rank	Shareholder	Percentage Ownership
1	National Pension Scheme of Zimbabwe	35.13
2	Shorecap II Limited–NNR	7.31
3	Stanbic Nominees–NNR	5.21
4	Tirent Investments Private Limited	4.73
5	Cashgrant Investments Private Limited	4.11
6	Local Authorities Pension Fund	3.32
7	Stanbic Nominees Private Limited	3.24
8	FBC Holdings Limited	3.17
9	SCB Nominees	1.75
10	Vidryl International Private Limited	1.70
11	Others	30.33
Total		100.00

== Branch network ==
FBC Bank maintains branches at the following locations:

1. Head Office - 45 Nelson Mandela Avenue, Harare
2. Samora Machel Avenue Branch - 76 Samora Machel Avenue, Harare
3. Nelson Mandela Avenue Branch - 34 Nelson Mandela Avenue, Belvedere, Harare
4. Msasa Branch - 104 Mutare Road, Msasa Industrial Area, Harare
5. FBC Private Bank Branch - 2 Lanark Road, Belgravia, Harare
6. Southerton Branch - 11 Highfields Junction Shops, Southerton, Harare
7. Bulawayo Branch - 108 Jason Moyo Avenue, Bulawayo
8. International Airport Branch - Harare International Airport
9. Mutare Branch - 50B Herbert Chitepo Street, Mutare
10. Zvishavane Branch - Robert Mugabe Way, Zvishavane
11. Kwekwe Branch - Robert Mugabe Way, Kwekwe
12. Beitbridge Branch - NSSA Complex, Beitbridge
13. Chitungwiza Branch - 197 Tilcor Township, Seke, Chitungwiza
14. Victoria Falls Branch - Shops 4&5 Galleria Complex, Victoria Falls
15. Bulawayo Private Bank Branch - 2nd Floor, FBC House, 108 Jason Moyo Avenue, Bulawayo
16. Graniteside Branch - 1 Crawford Graniteside Off Seke Road Harare

== See also ==
- List of banks in Zimbabwe
- Reserve Bank of Zimbabwe
- Economy of Zimbabwe
