= Causeway, Harare =

Commercial district in Harare, Zimbabwe

Causeway is a commercial district on the southeast edge of central Harare. The area is a busy workaday district that hosts numerous civic institutions, research institutes, and international organizations. Additionally, many government departments and ministries are headquartered here, along with museums such as the National Gallery of Art.

== History ==
When Harare was founded, the intended site for a capital was initially Mount Hampden, but the Mukuvisi stream that flowed just south of the Kopje area, provided better water supply and it was decided that the kopje site was preferable.

At that time, the area was marshy with a stream running along what is now Julius Nyerere Way into the Mukuvisi River and the first area to be drained, near the head of the stream, was named Causeway and soon became the site of the most important Government buildings. Commercial businesses tended to favour the area around the Kopje in Pioneer Street, now Kaguvi Street, but development was somewhat haphazard. The Kopje side was better provided than the Causeway side of Salisbury. The greatest challenge was water which was brought from the Mukuvisi River in large wooden barrels.

Salisbury was declared a municipality in 1897 with its first elected Mayor, W.E. Fairbridge. In 1898, the name Southern Rhodesia was adopted for the territory and when the railway arrived from Beira in 1899, and the town began to develop as a trading and administrative centre. The link with Bulawayo and South Africa was delayed however until 1902 by the Second Anglo-Boer War. Hubert Hervey an early, British resident described the area as follows;

The town is practically divided into two geographical sections, the ‘Koppi’ where most of the business buildings at present are, and the ‘Causeway’ or Government side, which is a much pleasanter and quiet place to live in, and has the government buildings, club, post and telegraph office, bank and hospital.

Gradually through the late 1890’s, the commercial activities of the town began to move from the area of the Kopje and Pioneer Street (now Kaguvi Street) towards the Causeway end of Manica Road, ushering a prosperous period during which Causeway evolved to gradually become the central business district, and many of grand old buildings were demolished.

== Cityscape ==
The district is the most densely built area of Zimbabwe, due to the large number of high-rise buildings and apartment towers built in the 1950s, 1960s and 1990s. The area is characterized by government institutions and small-businesses, with stately Cape Dutch, Victorian and beaux-arts style buildings at the edges of 'town' or on quieter streets. It is a primarily institutional neighbourhood, several government institutions, civic institutions, a hospital, museum among many colleges and technical schools.

Greenwood Park and Africa Unity Square provide open space and parkland within the area.

== Demographics ==
Causeway is one of the more cosmopolitan neighbourhoods in the city, bustling with energy during the day thanks to a mix of residents, civil servants and expats all rubbing shoulders during business hours. Since the early 2000s, there is a sizeable population of Chinese small business owners living in the area, selling cheap goods and operating restaurants, so much so that part of the area is sometimes informally named New Chinatown. The area is also home to numerous small but diverse independently owned and operated restaurants, bars and cafés.

The city center's focus to the north, and the near-complete low number of residents, has the effect of emptying the district when businesses closed in the evening. At that time, the lack of nightlife gave the district a reputation for being unsafe late at night.

== Africa Unity Square ==
Africa Unity Square, is a large public piazza, located near the Civic Centre on the southern edge of central Harare. It offers a view of downtown and Causeway. It is notable due to its historic architecture and location, but increasingly has been neglected by the city council.

== Institutions ==
Causeway is home to various Harare institutions including:

- Eastgate Centre, Harare
- Africa Unity Square
- New Government Complex
- Causeway Post Office
- Kaguvi Government Buildings
- National Social Security Authority
- National Gallery of Zimbabwe
- Geological Survey Department
- Zimbabwe Red Cross Society Training Centre
- Ministry of Industry and Commerce
- Cathedral of the Sacred Heart
- The United Nations -Africa and Zimbabwe Office
- Econet Global House
- Zimbabwe Nurses Association

== See also ==
- Rotten Row
