= Newlands, Harare =

Suburb of Harare, Zimbabwe

Newlands is a low density, residential suburb located in eastern Harare, Zimbabwe.

== Name ==
Newlands was named by South African-born Colin Duff, the Secretary for Agriculture in the 1920s after Newlands, Cape Town. Duff had played rugby for Western Province before moving north to then Southern Rhodesia.

== Features ==
Newlands is best noted for its proximity to Harare International Airport not to far from nearby Arlington as well as a notable number of residents of Asian descent similar to Greendale and Belvedere. The Eastern suburbs are generally considered middle to upper middle class areas, not quite as wealthy as the northeastern suburbs, but better off than areas south of the Harare-Bulawayo railway.

Newlands is a mixed use suburb of Harare. It is located in the east of the city. It borders the suburbs of Eastlea, Gunhill and Highlands. The long-established Newlands Country Club Golf Course, forms the eastern edge of Newlands. It is a garden suburb, with many of its homes dating back to the 1930s and 1940s. It is also one of the more popular dining spots in the city, renowned for its cafes, bars, hotels and diverse cuisine, mainly based around Victoria and Princess Drives. Nearby suburbs with a similar atmosphere, popular for their mixed use nature and dining include Eastlea, The Avenues, Milton Park and Greendale. The suburb has a vibrant cosmopolitan atmosphere, and the residents comprise a mix of cultures including black, white, Indian and Chinese.

== Housing ==
The houses in Newlands are on average larger than older neighbourhoods such as Eastlea, and consists mostly of detached homes. The gardens are traditionally large and contain many trees, but in recent times, larger residential buildings and townhouses, with more houses and smaller gardens, have been built along commercial corridors of the suburb, particularly around Cambridge Rd.

== Notable institutions ==
- Zimbabwe Cricket
- Newlands Country Club Golf Club
- World Health Organization- Africa and Zimbabwe office
- UNESCO Regional Office for Southern Africa
- National Biotechnology Authority of Zimbabwe
- Harare Culinary Arts Academy

=== Embassies ===
- Embassy of the Netherlands
- Embassy of France

=== Churches ===
- Newlands Anglican Church
- Newlands Seventh-day Adventist Church
- Harare Temple, Church of Jesus Christ of Latter-day Saints
