= Mukuvisi Woodlands =

Nature reserve in Harare, Zimbabwe

- Interactive map of Mukuvisi Woodlands
- Location: Harare, Zimbabwe
- Coordinates: 17.8353°S 31.0885°E
- Area: 263 ha (650 acres)
- Created: 1980
- Administrator: Mukuvisi Woodlands Association
- Website: www.mukuvisiwoodland.co.zw

Mukuvisi Woodlands is a wildlife reserve in Harare, Zimbabwe. Founded in 1980, the reserve spans 263 hectares and includes trails and wildlife-viewing platforms. Species found in the reserve include zebras, giraffes, elands, wildebeests, and impalas, as well as over 300 species of birds and over 140 species of trees. The reserve has also hosted events such as music festivals and school trips.

== Management ==
Mukuvisi Woodlands has been a target of poachers. Species taken illegally include tortoises as well as trees, which are illicitly logged for firewood.

Wetland areas of the preserve have been shrinking and are at risk due to urban development in Harare.

A community of squatters, many of whom had been displaced by Operation Murambatsvina, developed in the preserve by 2018.

On 8 January 2022, armed robbers attacked Mukuvisi Woodlands, stealing US$19,040 worth of cash and electronics.
