= Sam Nujoma Street =

Road in Harare, Zimbabwe

Coordinates: 17°49′35″S 31°03′01″E

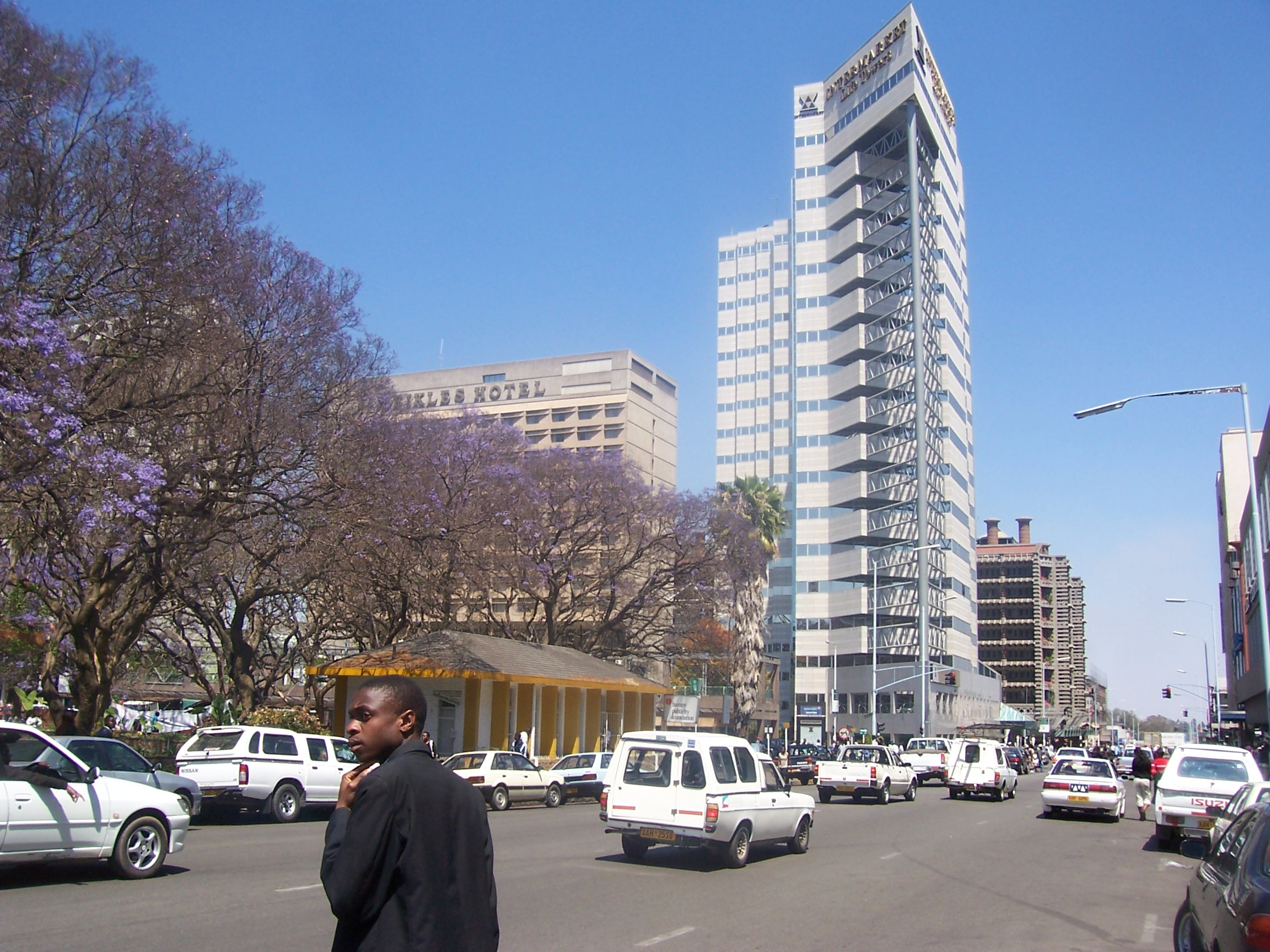

Sam Nujoma Street is one of the main streets of Harare, Zimbabwe. It was originally called Second Street but was renamed to Sam Nujoma Street in honour of Sam Nujoma, the first President of Namibia. It also is connected to the main park in Harare which is opposite the Cathedral of St Mary and All Saints.
