= Rotten Row, Harare =

Road in Harare, Zimbabwe

Rotten Row is a road and historic district located in the west-central section of downtown Harare, Zimbabwe. It begins at the intersection of Prince Edward Street and Samora Machel Avenue and runs to the flyover where it borders Mbare on Cripps Road. The vast majority of the district is occupied by various national and municipal courthouses and office buildings. Today, Rotten Row is best known as the city's legal district, home to the High Court and the city's most prestigious law firms

== Background ==
Rotten Row was named after the Rotten Row in London. The term "Rotten Row" is a corrupted form of the French phrase ‘Route du Roi’, the King's Road. Early central Harare had both a commercial and residential area. Its proximity to the courthouses attracted lawyers, judges, and clerks to the neighbourhood, while its downtown setting, made it ideal for government employees. Today, it is best known as Harare's legal district home to The Harare Magistrate's Court, the Harare Central Library and the ZANU-PF headquarters, along with numerous law offices. The neighbourhood also lends its name of to the eponymous book by Petina Gappah published in 2016.

== Architecture ==
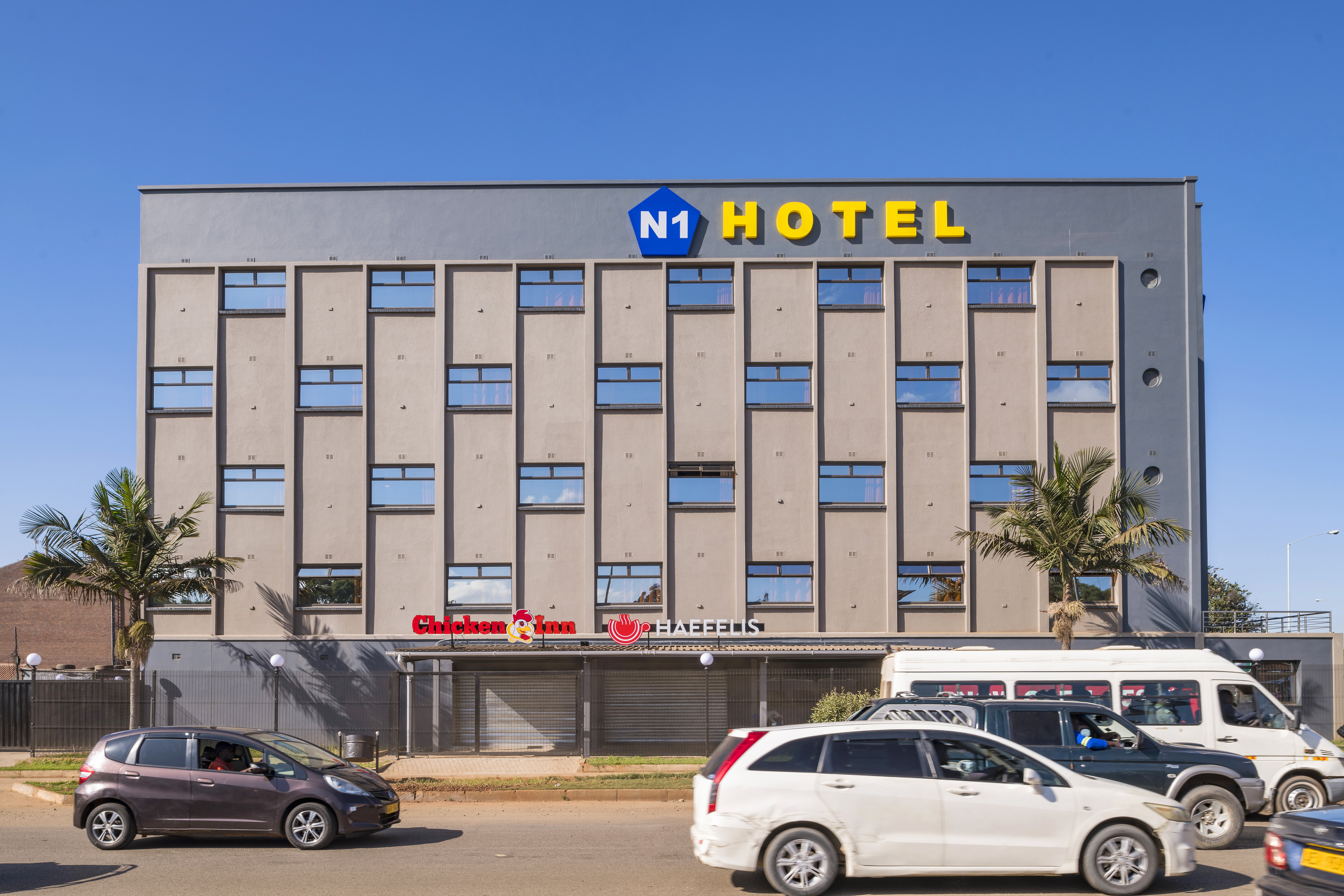
Street view from Samora Machel of the N1 Hotel in Rotten Row, Harare

The architects who worked along Rotten Row and the early urban core included Sir Herbert Baker, William D'Arcy Cathart, Le Roux, and James Alfred Cope-Christie. The architecture is an eclectic mix of the pioneer, Cape Dutch, Queen Anne, brutalist, postmodern and neo-classical styles, though other styles also figured prominently, sometimes within the same building and sometimes scaled back to save on costs. Despite this Rotten Row never achieved the prestige of the Kopje or Causeway areas, instead become a workaday district and ultimately a home to several judicial institutions.

== Points of interest ==
Notable institutions along and in Rotten Row include:

- The Zimbabwe Museum of Human Sciences
- The Zanu-PF HQ Building
- Harare Magistrate's Court
- Harare City Library
