= ZANU–PF Building =

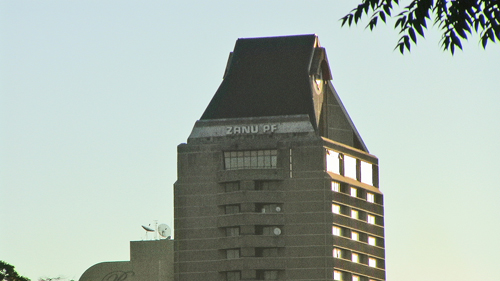
- Interactive map of the ZANU–PF Building area
- Alternative names: The "Shake Shake" building

General information
- Architectural style: Postmodern
- Location: Corner of Samora Machel Avenue & Rotten Row, Harare, Zimbabwe
- Coordinates: 17.829761741474474°S 31.039345377255696°E
- Current tenants: ZANU–PF
- Construction started: Late 1980s
- Completed: 1990
- Owner: ZANU–PF

Technical details
- Floor count: 15

Design and construction
- Architects: Peter Martin; Tony Wales-Smith

The ZANU–PF Building is a 15-story high-rise building in Harare, Zimbabwe, which serves as the headquarters of ZANU–PF, the country's ruling party. The top floors of the building hold the offices of the ZANU–PF Politburo, lower floors hold other party offices, and the first floor is home to the ZANU Archives, which holds many records from the Rhodesian Bush War. The building hosts annual meetings of the party's politburo, central committee, and other organizations.

== Location ==
The ZANU–PF Building is located in Harare, Zimbabwe, at the corner of Samora Machel Avenue and Rotten Row, next to Willoughby Crescent.

== History ==
Fundraising for a new ZANU–PF headquarters began on 24 October 1983, when the party set a goal of raising Z$15 million in one year. Ultimately paid for by the Chinese Communist Party, construction began in the late 1980s, and the building was completed in 1990. Constructed during the post-independence building boom, the ZANU–PF Building, unlike many others at the time, was designed by Zimbabwean architects, Peter Martin and Tony Wales-Smith. At the time of its completion, it was the tallest building in Harare. It became nicknamed the "Shake Shake" building, for its resemblance to Chibuku Shake Shake, a type of sorghum beer sold in cartons.

== Architecture ==
The ZANU–PF Building is a 15-story grey concrete structure, topped by a large emblem of a cockerel, a symbol of ZANU–PF. It is of the postmodern style, and is sometimes described as Brutalist.

== See also ==
- List of tallest buildings in Zimbabwe
