= National Botanic Garden (Zimbabwe) =

Botanical garden in Harare, Zimbabwe

Coordinates: 17°48′6″S 31°03′03″E

National Botanic Garden of Zimbabwe is situated about 4 km north of Harare City Centre in the suburb of Alexandra Park. It also houses the National Herbarium of Zimbabwe. The gardens have an area of almost 7 square kilometres. It was initially established as a recreation area in 1902. In 1962 it became the National Botanic Gardens under the direction of Hiram Wild, who at the time was the head of the SRGH (Southern Rhodesian Government Herbarium). Half of the gardens are devoted to indigenous plants from Zimbabwe's woodlands and include most of the 750 species found in the country. Other areas contain plants typical to the African continent including rare and endangered species, as well as exotics from South America, India, Australia and the Far East. It contains 90% of the different ecological habitats in found in Zimbabwe.

Wild appointed Tom Muller from Switzerland as the first curator in 1961 or 1962. At this time the herbarium was an old building that eventually moved to new, custom built premises in the National Gardens (circa 1967). By then Bob Drummond was in charge as Wild had moved to the university as professor of plant taxonomy.

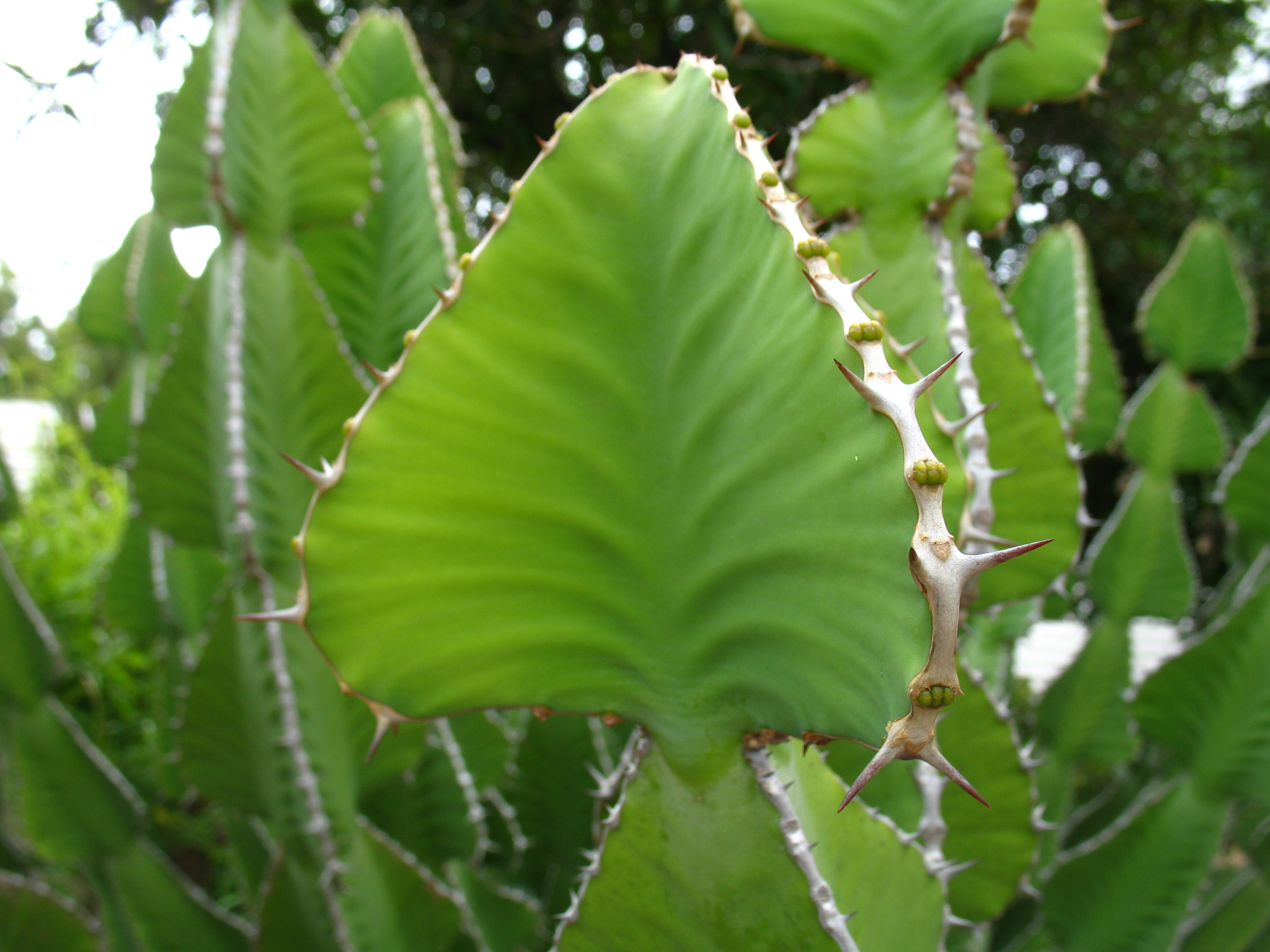
National Botanic Garden (Zimbabwe)
