= Alexandra Park, Harare =

Suburb of Harare, Zimbabwe

Coordinates: 17°48′S 31°03′E

Alexandra Park is a residential suburb in the north of Harare, Zimbabwe. The area was developed for White former servicemen and their families in the post-war years following the Second World War.

Notable institutions located in Alexandra Park include the National Botanic Garden (Zimbabwe) and National Herbarium; the National Parks and Wildlife services of Zimbabwe; the Zimbabwe Rugby Union; St George's College (private secondary boys school); Alexandra Park Primary School; Hartmann House (private boys primary school); and the Embassy of Bulgaria.

== History ==
The suburb of Alexandra Park was originally set up to address housing shortages for the White population in the immediate aftermath of the Second World War; the Government of Southern Rhodesia at the time promised White former servicemen plots of half-acre land once the war was over, and Alexandra Park was one of the suburbs in which this land was allocated. Many of the street names reflect significant places or people involved in the Second World War, such as Churchill Avenue, Dunkirk Drive, or Normandy Road.

Alexandra Park includes the following roads and streets: Churchill Avenue, Borrowdale Road; Sam Nujoma Street (formerly Second Street); Sandringham Drive; Kirkwood Road; Maasdorp Avenue; Earls Road; Arundel Road; Fleetwood Road; Normandy Road, Dunkirk Drive; Carlisle Drive; and Clairwood Road.

== See also ==
- Mount Pleasant, Harare
- Avondale, Harare
- Post-war economic boom
