= Belvedere, Harare =

- Neighborhood
- Location within Zimbabwe
- Coordinates: 17°49′39″S 31°00′43″E
- Country: Zimbabwe
- Province: Harare
- District: Harare
- Elevation: 1,490 m (4,890 ft)
- estimated
- Time zone: UTC+2 (CAT)
  - Summer (DST): UTC+2 (not observed)

Belvedere is a suburb of Harare, the capital city and the largest metropolitan area of Zimbabwe. Though historically home to a notable Indian population since 2012 Belvedere has become known for its growing Chinese population, due to the construction of Longcheng Plaza. The area is found to the west of the central Harare by the suburbs of Ridgeview, Monovale and Warren Park. It is noted for a new Chinatown that exists around the Longcheng area. This new Chinatown is now considered as the main Chinatown in Harare, replacing a nascent area in the CBD.

== Location ==
Belvedere lies to the west of Harare's central business district and connects the center of the city to the more western suburbs of Warren Park and Mbare, where the National Sports Stadium is located. The travel distance from downtown Harare to Belvedere is approximately 4 kilometres (2.5 mi) by road. The coordinates of Belvedere, Harare are:17 49 39S, 31 00 43E (Latitude:-17.8275; Longitude:31.0120).

== Overview ==
There is a sizeable Asian community of Indian origin in the area. There are two colleges, Harare Institute of Technology and Belvedere Teachers' College. FBC Bank, one of Zimbabwe's 17 licensed commercial banks, has a branch in Belvedere.

Up until approximately 2010, Belvedere was a predominantly an Indian and South Asian neighbourhood. However, massive Chinese investment focused on Longcheng Plaza has led to an influx of new residents, drastically changing the character and demographics of the area.

== Longcheng Plaza ==
Longcheng Plaza (literally Dragon City plaza) is a Chinese-built, outdoor shopping mall, that opened to the public December 2013. The plaza is home to a casino, supermarket and numerous shops offering a wide range of products and services.

The mall was designed according to Chinese architectural styles - a first in Zimbabwe, revealing growing ties between Zimbabwe and China. The construction of the plaza has essentially made Belvedere the city's new Chinatown - a hub for Chinese businesses within the city. Across the supermarket lies furniture and hardware stores offering stores, as well as a nightclub and casino.

Construction of Longcheng Plaza, though successful has proved highly controversial due to the village's construction being out of step with local architectural styles and its construction on what had been an important wetland. Additionally, many inhabitants of the new Chinatown in Belvedere are first generation Chinese immigrants from mainland China. The Chinatown has a number of paifang (arches) that dot the shopping centre and have become popular tourist attractions.
