= Hartsfield =

Hartsfield is an English habitational surname. Notable people with the surname include:

- Bob Hartsfield (1931–1999), American baseball player
- Daisy Hartsfield, American politician
- Henry Hartsfield (1933–2014), American astronaut and United States Air force officer
- Myles Hartsfield (born 1997), American football player
- Phill Hartsfield (1932–2010), American knifemaker and weapon designer
- Roy Hartsfield (1925–2011), American baseball player
- William B. Hartsfield (1890–1971), American politician
  - Hartsfield–Jackson Atlanta International Airport, named after William Hartsfield
