= Avondale, Harare =

Suburb of Harare, Zimbabwe

Avondale is a residential suburb in north and northwest Harare, Zimbabwe, located about 3.5 kilometres (2 mi) north of Harare city centre and just west of Mount Pleasant. It is the earliest suburb established in Harare, having been laid out in 1903. Prior to becoming a suburb Avondale was a dairy farm and was named after Avondale, County Wicklow, Ireland the home of the 19th-century Irish politician Charles Stewart Parnell. Avondale was incorporated into Harare Municipality in 1934.

== Location ==
The neighbourhood's western border is an extension known as Avondale West, that forms part of Harare's northwest suburbs. Avondale is bordered to its north by Emerald Hill and Mount Pleasant. Its southern border runs along Lomagundi Road, beyond which lie the Greencroft and Avonlea neighborhoods to the west, while Mabelreign lies to the southwest.

== History ==
Avondale is one of Harare's oldest suburbs, formally laid out in 1903, just over a decade after the city itself. Before its incorporation as a suburb, Avondale was a dairy farm and was named after Avondale, County Wicklow, Ireland the home of the 19th-century Irish politician Charles Stewart Parnell.

The first official marriage ceremony in Zimbabwe took place on Avondale farm in 1894 when the Count de la Panouse was married to Fanny Pearson (Countess Billie) by Lt Col. Marshall Hole, the Chief Magistrate of Salisbury. Countess Billie managed the dairy farm and at the time supplied Salisbury with 100 bottles of milk a day and 100 pounds of butter a week.

Independence, ushered in a wave of gentrification in Avondale proper in the 1980s and 1990s, and the area is now a more mainstream and popular location with coffeehouses, restaurants, bars, fast casual food, theatres and retail stores. Since 1997, the weekly Avondale Flea Market has operated a curio and farmers market near Avondale Shopping Centre.

== Demographics ==
By the mid 20th century, the Avondale area was predominantly middle and upper middle-class. In this era, white Zimbabweans of British descent (see Anglo-African) formed the majority of the population, with a notable minority of second and third-generation Irish Catholics forming a small portion of the neighborhood's ethnic composition, many of them having moved to Avondale from nearby Emerald Hill. The area gradually became more diverse after 1980, as middle class Shona Zimbabweans began to move into the area to escape the more congested neighbourhoods south of the CBD such as Hatfield, Highfield and Mbare.

Since 2000, the incidence of poverty in Avondale has increased slightly in all categories due to Zimbabwe's volatile economy, although poverty rates remained well below the citywide figures. In 1992, less than 10 percent of all persons were poor, about 7 percent of families were living below poverty, 16 percent of children were poor, and about 12 percent of the elderly had income below the poverty level.

=== Western areas ===
The western extension of the Avondale area, known as Avondale West, is a largely wooded residential enclave bounded by Suffolk, Lomagundi and Dublin roads. Structures in this area are primarily spacious single family homes, in contrast to the more densely and developed east. A few of the original 20th-century houses remain, some with gabled Cape Dutch touches but the area is mostly post-war suburbia. The eastern border of Avondale, along King George Road, is far more commercialised with a mix of businesses, schools, mid-rise apartment buildings and embassies. Notable among these is St. Anne's Hospital and Avondale Shopping Centre. The commercial corridor along King George is home to plenty of shopping in the neighborhood that extends northeast to Mount Pleasant and south towards the CBD.

== Education ==
- Notable schools and educational institutions in Avondale include;
  - Avondale Primary School
  - Twin Rivers School
  - Blakistone School
  - Littlerock International School
- Colleges and institutions
  - Hillbright Science College
- The British Council operates a library and cultural institution on Cork Road.
