= Lewisam =

- Suburb
- Location within Zimbabwe
- Coordinates: 17°49′15″S 31°02′57″E
- Country: Zimbabwe
- Province: Harare
- District: Harare
- Founded: 1937

Government

Area
  - Urban: 2.3 km^{2} (0.89 sq mi)
- Elevation: 1,505 m (4,938 ft)

Population (2012)
  - Suburb: 4,489
  - Density: 5,055.3/km^{2} (13,093/sq mi)
- estimated
- Time zone: UTC+2 (CAT)
  - Summer (DST): UTC+2 (not observed)

Lewisam (/ˈluːɪʃəm/ LOO-ish-əm; see below) is an area in the northeastern suburbs of Harare, Zimbabwe. Together with more well known districts, such as Belgravia and adjoining Newlands, it forms part of the city's embassy row, home for example to the British ambassador's residence and the Italian embassy.

Lewisam was sparsely populated until the development Enterprise Rd, in the post war era, which encouraged the development of the northern suburbs. It is bordered by Highlands to the west, Newlands to the south and Chisipite to the north and northeast.

== History ==
In the 1930s Lewisam's high elevation (at over 1501m above sea level) and ‘healthy air’ encouraged a growing number of middle class residents to move to the area. However, like most northeast Harare districts, with the exception of Borrowdale, its rapid growth did not begin until after the Second World War and the development of the A2 highway. The A2 highway better known as Enterprise Road in northern Harare, came to Lewisham in 1949, making the area readily accessible from the city centre.

Until the 1970s, developers built substantial houses for the upper middle classes, accompanied by a sprinkling of cheaper housing, known as 'cottages' mostly for gardeners and domestic workers who provided their services to residents. Thereafter, the wealthy began to leave and the area around Enterprise Road become home to more commercial buildings, with larger residences and civic amenities spilling across Dulwich Road into neighbouring Chisipite.

With its growth as a transport hub – served by two major throughfares and buses – Lewisam grew in importance as a shopping centre.

== Etymology ==
Lewisam is named after the eponymous district of Lewisham in London, though early in its history, the 'h' in Lewisham fell out of use and it is not quite clear why, despite both areas being pronounced in the same manner. Due to this fact, as well as a tendency to conflate the area with Newlands, Highlands or the more prestigious Chisipite, non-residents tend to mispronounce Lewisam with an 's'-sound rather than the correct 'sh'-sound.

Another testament to the suburb's, London connections, are its roads such as Bayswater and Dulwich roads, which are named after places in central and south London.

== Character ==
Though predominantly residential, since the 1990s, it has also become one of the more popular dining spots in the city, renowned for its cafes and restaurants, with an array of cuisines, mainly based on Enterprise and Arcturus Roads. Other suburbs with a similar atmosphere, popular for their dining include Newlands, Highlands, and Milton Park.

However, because northern Harare's major through routes skirt the edge of the district and its relatively smaller borders, Lewisam is much quieter and less well-known than neighbours like Chisipite.

== Housing ==
Homes in Lewisam are on average larger than older neighbourhoods such as Eastlea or Milton Park, and consists mostly of single family detached homes. The gardens are traditionally large and contain many trees, but in recent times, commercial and residential buildings and townhouses, with greater density, have been built along commercial corridors of the suburb, particularly around Enterprise Rd.

== Notable institutions ==
- Lewisam Primary School
- Grosvenor House
- The SPCA of Zimbabwe

=== Embassies ===
- British ambassador's residence
- Embassy of Italy
