= Chisipite =

Coordinates: 17°45′S 31°10′E

- Suburb
- Interactive map of Chisipite
- Country: Zimbabwe
- Province: HRE
- City: Harare
- Developed: 1937

Government
  - MP: Theresa Maonei Makone (Harare North (parliamentary constituency))

Chisipite, colloquially known as Chisi is an affluent residential suburb in northeastern Harare, Zimbabwe. It is bordered by Enterprise Road to the north and Eastern road to the east, and Greendale to the south to Lewisam to the west. Begun in the mid 20th century as a planned garden suburb, it did not fully develop until after the Second World War.

Centred on Hindhead Avenue, the suburb grew slowly with medium-sized houses on narrow but deep lots. It is commonly regarded as one of the most expensive and exclusive neighbourhoods in the city, home to upper-middle-class families. Demographically, the neighbourhood has a diverse black and white population.

== History ==
Chisipite was founded as part of a subdivision known as Rietfontein, developed by the Jenkinson family. The name, Chisipite, means “overflowing spring” in Shona, and an exaggerated fountain is the symbol of both the suburb and Chisipite Junior and Secondary schools. Robert Ballantyne, a potato farmer in nearby Ballantyne Park, represented Chisipite in parliament as part of the larger Highlands constituency from 1948-1953. He died while debating on the floor of the House of Assembly.

Chisipite became an upper-income community in the postwar years, and until the 1980s its population was majority white and anglophone. This began to change after the eighties, as black Zimbabweans gained access to better-paying careers. The suburb became popular and today the community is ethnically diverse and also home to a significant expat and Asian populations.

== Character ==
In 2011, Pam Goulding real estate, named it the wealthiest housing market in Zimbabwe. Chisipite's shops, schools and recreational facilities are located on its northwestern periphery. Many of the residents belong to The Greendale and Newlands Golf Clubs, golf and recreational members clubs east and south of Chispite.

The shopping district includes fashion stores, supermarkets, sporting goods stores, gift shops, bakeries, restaurants and coffee shops.

== Architecture ==
Chisipite is composed primarily of single-family detached houses. Newer homes tend to be larger and more expensive than postwar houses that dominate the southern and eastern edge of the suburb. Since 2010, parts of Chisipite have been redeveloped with larger houses many of which are owned by wealthy non-resident Zimbabweans.

== Tourism ==
Chisipite along with nearby Newlands has developed into a hub for travel lodges, bed and breakfasts and airbnb properties, with many are scattered around residential and commercial areas. The tranquil suburban ambience combined with scenic views and a mild climate has made Chisipite a popular respite form the city centre for tourists, expats and non-resident Zimbabweans.

There are various establishments offering accommodation, including bed & breakfasts, self-catering, lodges, backpackers and guest houses in the surrounding area.

Activities include: horse riding, hiking, and golfing. Live music, restaurants and other amenities are centred around Enterprise Rd and Harare Drive.

== Education ==
Chisipite is home to a number of private schools, offering both primary and secondary levels of education.

- Chisipite Senior School - Hindhead Avenue
- Oriel Boys' High School - 32 Hindhead Ave
- Oriel Girls School - Harare Drive
- Chisipite Junior School - 20 St. Aubin's Walk

== See also ==
- Glen Lorne
- Umwindsidale
- Chisipite Senior School
