= Milton Park, Harare =

Milton Park
- Suburb
- Location within Zimbabwe
- Coordinates: 17°49′15″S 31°02′57″E
- Country: Zimbabwe
- Province: Harare
- District: Harare
- Founded: 1903

Area
  - Urban: 20.27 km^{2} (7.83 sq mi)
- Elevation: 1,484 m (4,869 ft)

Population (2022)
  - Suburb: 16,641
  - Density: 820.9/km^{2} (2,126/sq mi)
- estimated
- Time zone: UTC+2 (CAT)
  - Summer (DST): UTC+2 (not observed)

Milton Park is a densely populated, inner city, mixed use suburb just west of central Harare, Zimbabwe. Due to its density, diversity and character it is often compared to The Avenues, Belgravia, Greendale, Eastlea and Highlands. Separated from the CBD by the A1 highway east, is it is usually considered to be bounded to the south by Princes Road, to the north by Cork Road, to the west by Warren Hills Golf Club.

== Description ==
Milton Park is best known as a historically diverse Shona, Coloured and Greek and Portuguese lower middle class suburb. Often contrasted with wealthy Borrowdale or Mount Pleasant to the north, in recent years it has been strongly affected by both gentrification and economic inequality.

== History ==
Situated west of Harare’s city centre, Milton Park was named after Sir William Henry Milton, an early administrator from 1898 to 1914, who was known as the 'Father of the Civil Service'. The street names in the suburb are all of former mayors of Harare. William Harvey Brown (1909–1910), J. Van Praagh (1900–1901), James Lawson (1913), William Ernest Fairbridge (1897–1898 first mayor of Salisbury) and H. L. Lezard (1914–15).

Milton Park, Eastlea and the Avenues are considered to have a fairly common social makeup. Historically, Milton Park was occupied predominantly by recently arrived blue-collar workers from Britain while Avenues was occupied primarily by Southern Europeans, mostly Greeks and Portuguese, who worked in factories in Willowvale and Southerton or on the railroads. Today both neighbourhoods have a population of varied ethnicity and social class, though many former white residents have long moved away, to be replaced by young professionals, young families and expats; especially in the recent housing developments that have sprouted along the Princes Road and Bishop Gaul Avenue. A great number of students from neighboring districts attend Speciss College and the University of Zimbabwe, College of Health Sciences, lending additional vibrancy to the area.

== Community diversity ==
Beginning in the 1950s, with the establishment of the Federation of Rhodesia and Nyasaland, Milton Park, along with Eastlea and Avenues, came to acquire a unique niche as the home of Harare's working and lower middle-class Southern European Greek, Portuguese and Italian communities. Being located near Harare's train stations, among the most important sites for the nascent trans-Southern African railway industry, these central districts became home to a great many Greek workers from Cyprus and Portuguese from Mozambique, Madeira and Portugal, as well as a few Italian Zimbabweans, who came to make up a significant proportion of the population.

The profile of the neighbourhood has changed significantly in recent years. Black Zimbabweans now constituted the largest population with growing minorities mostly of Indian and Chinese descent. as well as immigrants from further afield in Africa. Regardless Milton Park's heritage is evident in institutions such as, St Patrick's Capuchin Friary Catholic Church, cafes and restaurants, the restaurant row on Cork Road; and The Italian Club and the Hellenic Club of Harare in nearby Eastlea.

== Gentrification ==
Milton Park is just west of city centre. Its proximity to the railways shaped the neighbourhood with a large industrial working class. Light industry dominated the area until its neoliberal reforms led to the closure of several industries in the 1990s. Its closure meant the predominantly lower middle-class neighborhood residents began to lose their jobs, creating thousands of unemployed laborers. This deindustrialization rendered the neighborhood the site for gentrification. Sitting on valuable land bordered by the A1 highway and both the downtown and wealthy districts such as Alexandra Park and Mount Pleasant, as well as affluent institutions such as Prince Edward School, Milton Park is primed for the redevelopment of townhomes and buildings into parks, mixed use developments, apartments, shops and restaurants. This transformation began taking form of businesses moving to the area from the increasingly congested city centre, attracting NGOs, young professionals and young families looking for affordable housing.

Many institutions have expanded into the area, bringing residents and tourists to the area, while pushing long term residents out. Milton Park is experiencing an unequal form of gentrification, characterized by the arrival of dual citizens pushing out working class and unemployed residents and the revitalization of the neighborhood with parks and commercial spaces. The form is a “lively suburb” known for its housing market and amenities in the midst of an economy with widespread unemployment.

== Points of interest ==
The most notable institutions in or near Milton Park include;

- Prince Edward School
- University of Zimbabwe, College Of Health Sciences
- Sharon Primary School
- Parirenyatwa Hospital Ward
