= Glen Lorne =

Neighbourhood in Harare, Zimbabwe

Coordinates: 17°44′56″S 31°08′29″E

Glen Lorne is an affluent neighbourhood in northeast Harare, Zimbabwe. It was originally known as Glen Lorne farm or Enterprise valley, beyond the city limits. It is located north of downtown Harare and is one of highest and hilliest suburbs. It is also one of the wealthiest and most prestigious neighbourhoods in Zimbabwe. Glen Lorne has been ranked the best neighbourhood in the city to live in by the Mail & Guardian. It is known as the area where the city's 'old money' lives, and is home to some of Zimbabwe's wealthiest citizens including former vice president, Kembo Mohadi. It is often compared to its larger and more well-known neighbour, Borrowdale to the northwest.

== History ==
Charles 'Lion' Stevens who emigrated to Harare from the Cape Colony in April 1891 when he received a prospecting license and was described as a colourful character, was one of the first to survey the nascent suburb, actively prospecting in the Enterprise Gold Belt area.

As the name suggests, Glen Lorne, is peppered with places featuring Scottish nomenclature, as a nod to its early developers, the Salisbury Real Estate Company, a Scottish backed outfit, crucial in the development of early Harare. The area remained peri-urban up until the Second World War, when mass suburbanisation, made the northern suburbs extremely attractive to affluent, white residents.

== Character ==
Glen Lorne is built among its several hills, preserved as indigenous parkland. Glen Lorne is full of discrete, cul de sacs and winding roads through the neighbourhood, which coupled with other physical boundaries (such as natural parkland and steep ravines) lead to a quieter residential area. Even though Glen Lorne is located in the middle of Harare, virtually no vehicular traffic and noise is low due the abundance of trees and foliage that surround the area. The homes are mostly single family detached dwellings, many of which are at least 40 years old with newer properties in the far north and in infill areas. Houses range from Cape Dutch, Edwardian and Tudor Revival in style to the more common contemporary designs.

Greystone Park Dam on the suburbs western edge is Glen Lorne's main recreational site, home to the annual autumn outdoor festival. The event typically consists of rides, games, flea market, braais and other outdoor activities. The event is traditionally on the first Saturday in May and is run and funded by private businesses.

Due to the suburb's relative tranquility, residents generally travel to nearby Borrowdale and Chisipite for greater amenities.

== Education ==
Though not in Glen Lorne proper, residents tend to send their children to the nearby private educational instructions that include;

- St. John's College
- Chisipite Senior School
- Chisipite Junior School
- The Heritage School
- St. George's College, Harare,
- Hartmann House Preparatory School
