= Alex Crawford =

British journalist (born 1962)

Alex Crawford OBE
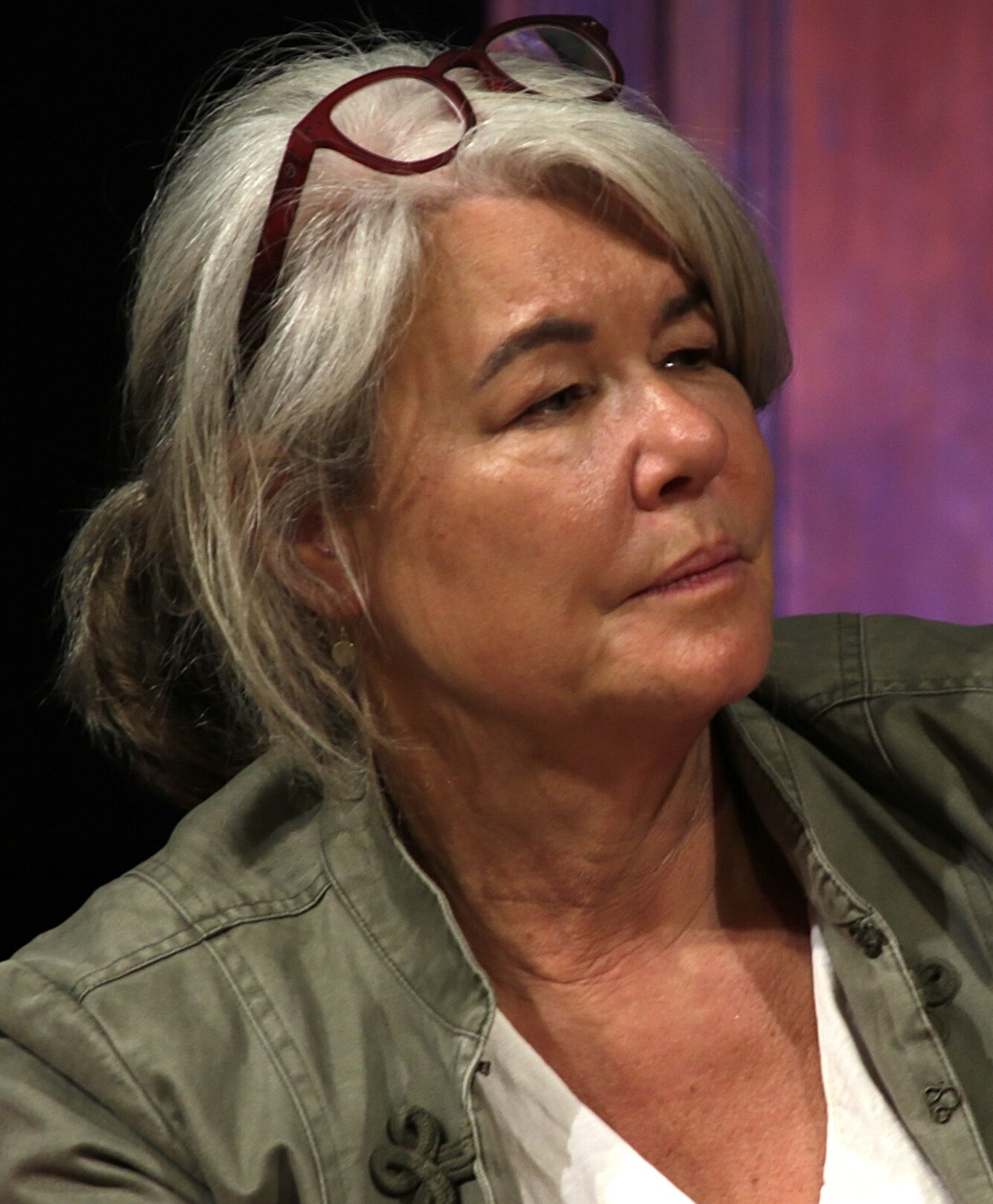
- Crawford in 2026
- Born: Alexandra Christine Crawford; 15 April 1962 (age 64); Surrey, England
- Occupation: Foreign correspondent
- Employer: Sky News
- Spouse: Richard Edmondson
- Children: 4

Alexandra Christine Crawford, OBE (born 15 April 1962) is a British journalist who currently works as a Special Correspondent for Sky News based in Turkey. She has been named Journalist of the Year fives times by the Royal Television Society and is known for reporting from the front lines of conflict zones.

== Biography ==
Crawford was born in Surrey in 1962 to an English-Chinese mother and a Scottish father. She was brought up in Nigeria, Zambia and Zimbabwe and educated at St John's Convent in Kitwe, Zambia and Chispite Junior and Chisipite Senior School in Harare, Zimbabwe and later at Cobham Hall School in Kent.

Crawford first worked in journalism at the Wokingham Times, completing a National Council for the Training of Journalists newspaper course in Newcastle while working there.

She subsequently worked for the BBC and for TV-am before joining Sky News when it was launched in 1989. She began working as a foreign correspondent for Sky News in 2005. Crawford has reported on the Gulf, the Middle East, the Arab Spring uprisings in Tunisia, Egypt, Bahrain and Libya and more recently the Russo-Ukrainian War.

She has been named Journalist of the Year on five occasions by the Royal Television Society and was appointed Officer of the Order of the British Empire (OBE) in the 2012 New Year Honours for services to broadcast journalism. Her work has been recognized by the Foreign Press Association in 2007, 2008, 2009 and 2010. She has also been cited by the Bayeux War Correspondents Awards for her reports from hostile environments for every year since 2007.

== Journalism since 2010 ==
=== Coverage of the Libyan Civil War ===
Crawford covered the 2011 Libyan Civil War. She was widely praised for her live on-scene reporting of the Battle of Tripoli. She was the first TV journalist to enter Libya with the rebels. She travelled with a rebel convoy into the heart of Tripoli, shooting direct live footage of the rebel advances, which reached Green Square with little resistance from pro-Gaddafi forces. She wore a helmet and bulletproof vest, stating that she did not feel in any danger, but wore them as a precaution against celebratory gunfire. She also covered the raid of Bab al-Azizia live from outside the compound, and was one of the first journalists to go inside once the raid was over.

=== Coverage of the Northern Mali conflict ===
Crawford was active in covering the Northern Mali conflict from 15 January 2013 until the end of French military operations. Her Sky News team was the first to enter Timbuktu after it was liberated by French forces.

=== Coverage of the Victoria Falls ===
In 2015, Crawford reported that the Victoria Falls, separating the nations of Zambia and Zimbabwe, was drying up. Tourism promoters and local leaders in both Zimbabwe and Zambia accused Crawford of being an alarmist and 'creating the news she reported on', by insisting on what the interviewees said in her report. The interviewees included a range of local workers, civilians, WWF leaders and an exclusive interview with the Zambian President who declared the drought the result of climate change. Every 10 years or so, the Zambezi river which passes through the falls experiences very high or very low water levels, a fact that Crawford was accused of not including in her report.

=== Coverage of the Syrian Civil War ===
In April 2019, amid the Dawn of Idlib military operation, Crawford and her media team, including Sky producer Martin Vowles and two civilian activists came under fire from Syrian government forces in the contested village of Hbit in the northern Idlib Governorate. Crawford said, "we were spotted by a military drone and then repeatedly shot at with what we believe were 125mm shells probably fired from a T-72 Russian battle tank". Bilal Abdul Kareem, an activist from New York, who had been acting as Crawford's guide, was injured in the shelling by shrapnel, and taken to Khan Shaykhun for medical treatment.

=== Coverage of the Russian invasion of Ukraine ===
Crawford currently covers the ongoing Russian invasion of Ukraine, having begun 5 March 2022. On 9 March Alex Crawford interviewed Ukrainian President Volodymyr Zelenskyy in English, discussing the current state of the conflict.

== Personal life ==
Crawford lives in Istanbul, Turkey, with her husband, sports journalist Richard Edmondson. They have four children, born ca. 1995, 1997, 1999 and 2002.

== Publications ==
- Colonel Gaddafi's Hat. London: Collins, 2012. ISBN 9780007467303
- How to Survive in a War Zone. London: Collins, 2012. ISBN 9780007506972

== See also ==
- War correspondent
