= Italian Zimbabweans =

Italian community in Zimbabwe

Italian Zimbabwean
Italo-zimbabwesi (Italian)

Total population
- 9,000 (2012); 30,000 - 40,000 people of Italian descent abroad, mostly the UK, South Africa and Australia

Regions with significant populations
- Harare, Bulawayo, Kariba, historically Chinhoyi and Masvingo

Languages
- English, minority Italian

Religion
- Predominately Roman Catholicism

Related ethnic groups
- Italians, Italian Algerians, Italian Angolans, Italian Egyptians, Italian Eritreans, Italian Ethiopians, Italian Libyans, Italian Moroccans, Italian Mozambicans, Italian Somalis, Italian South Africans, Italian Tunisians

Italian Zimbabweans (Italian: Italo-zimbabwesi) are citizens or residents of Zimbabwe of Italian heritage. The phrase may refer to someone born in the Zimbabwe of Italian descent, someone who has emigrated from Italy to Zimbabwe, a person with Italo-Zimbabwean heritage or someone born elsewhere (e.g. the UK, South Africa or Eritrea), who is of Italian descent and has migrated to Zimbabwe. Italian Zimbabweans form one of the younger communities of the Italian diaspora, largely a product of wartime and post-war immigration.

== History ==
The oldest area of Italian settlement in Zimbabwe was established as Sinoia – today's Chinhoyi – in 1906, as a group settlement scheme by a wealthy Italian lieutenant, Margherito Guidotti, who encouraged several Italian families to settle in the area. The name Sinoria derives from Tjinoyi, a Lozwi/Rozwi Chief who is believed to have been a son of Lukuluba (corrupted to Mukuruva by the Zezuru), who was the third son of Emperor Netjasike. The Kalanga (Lozwi/Rozwi name) was changed to Sinoia by the white settlers and later Chinhoyi by the Zezuru. In this period the majority of Italian arrivals were either Cape born or assimilated British Italians such as the Molteno family.

Early society in Southern Rhodesia was dominated by British settlers, many of whom displayed a hostile attitude towards non-British immigrants, particularly Afrikaners, who were often faced with discrimination, thus the number of European arrivals remained much lower than similar British territories such as Australia and New Zealand. The reluctance stemmed from the Rhodesian authorities’ focus on maintaining what were referred to as “European standards” by admitting only the “right type” of immigrant.

This class of immigrant was conceived of as possessing a large amount of capital and, more importantly, being of British stock. Evidence shows that the latter, rather than the former, was the more important criterion, and several financially well-endowed individuals and groups were denied entry into the country, mainly because they were non-British. Therefore, all official pronouncements about the need for more immigration notwithstanding, what mattered in deciding whether an applicant would be admitted into the country or not was where his father was born rather than the individual's skills or income.

As a result, besides Italians, Poles, Portuguese people, Jews, and especially Afrikaners faced difficulty entering the country, a policy which remained in place until World War Two. The next wave of migration to Southern Rhodesia occurred during World War II, when the British set up five camps in the colony to hold thousands of Axis prisoners of war and internees. Three of these camps, set up in 1941–42 in Gatooma, Umvuma, and Fort Victoria, accommodated roughly 5,000 Italians, mostly from Somaliland and Ethiopia. After Italy's surrender in September 1943, the British began repatriating Italian internees and POWs, sending them to Port Elizabeth, South Africa, where they were taken home by ship. Many Italians refused to return home, and were simply let out of the camps, and many of whom chose to remain or move to Southern Rhodesia.

== Postwar migration ==
After the war, a wave of liberalism ushered in by postwar politics and the Federation of Rhodesia and Nyasaland led to a loosening of restrictions that led to a boom in immigration from Britain, Southern Africa, and Southern Europe. The most prominent wave of Italian immigrants in this period was the hundreds of Southern Italian workers from The Kariba Lake Development Company and its French and Italian partners, who were hired to build Kariba Dam and Kariba. Most of these workers decided to settle in the nascent town once construction was finished. The Chapel of Santa Barbara in Kariba Heights is a notable landmark from this period.

Other migrants arrived directly from Italy, settling most prominently in Avenues, Milton Park, and Eastlea in Harare, with smaller groups moving to Bulawayo, Fort Victoria, and Umtali. A smaller wave of Italian immigrants arrived from South Africa and newly independent Eritrea, Ethiopia, and Somaliland.

The rapid growth of Salisbury in the postwar era that had attracted Italian immigrants created a strong demand for manufacturing work, and by the 1960s, most Italian and Greek migrants worked in Salisbury's retail, textile and manufacturing industries. Others started small businesses such as cafes, restaurants, barber shops, grocery stores, and bakeries in central areas such as Eastlea, Willowvale, and Milton Park. Italian women who entered the workforce often worked in the garment and clothing industry.

== Demographics ==
Italian Zimbabweans have often been lumped in with or confused for other immigrants from Southern Europe, particularly, Greek Zimbabweans and Portuguese people due to their Catholic faith and Mediterranean origins. Additionally, a minority of Coloured Zimbabweans have Italian heritage, mostly descended from Cape immigrants or immigrants who settled in coloured areas such as Arcadia, Braeside and parts of central-southern Harare during the 1950s and 1960s.

Along with other Zimbabweans, a disproportionate number of people of Italian descent now reside abroad, many of whom hold dual Italian or British citizenship. Regardless of the country's economic challenges, there is still a sizable Italian population in Zimbabwe. Though never comprising more than a fraction of the white Zimbabwean population, Italo-Zimbabweans are well represented in the hospitality, real estate, tourism and food and beverage industries. The majority live in Harare, with over 9,000 in 2012, (less than one percent of the city's population), while over 30,000 live abroad mostly in the UK, South Africa, Canada, Italy and Australia.

== Notable people ==
- Giovanni Arrighi – Italian-born economist, sociologist and analyst at the University of Zimbabwe and Johns Hopkins University
- Donata Katai – Olympic swimmer, representing Zimbabwe
- Marc Pozzo – award-winning radio host and broadcaster
- Bryan Mercurio – legal scholar at the Chinese University of Hong Kong and trade consultant
- Marco Mama – Zimbabwe rugby union player of Italian and Nigerian descent, plays for Worcester Warriors
- Sebastian Negri – dual Zimbabwean-Italian flanker for the Italian national rugby team
- Jake Averillo - Rugby league player for the Dolphins NRL side.

== See also ==
- Greeks in Zimbabwe
- Italian South Africans
