= Eastlea, Harare =

Eastlea
- Suburb
- Location within Zimbabwe
- Coordinates: 17°49′15″S 31°02′57″E
- Country: Zimbabwe
- Province: Harare
- District: Harare
- Founded: 1913

Area
  - Urban: 22.78 km^{2} (8.80 sq mi)
- Elevation: 1,484 m (4,869 ft)

Population (2022)
  - Suburb: 30,229
  - Density: 1,372/km^{2} (3,550/sq mi)
- estimated
- Time zone: UTC+2 (CAT)
  - Summer (DST): UTC+2 (not observed)

Eastlea is a central-east, mixed use, medium density suburb of Harare, Zimbabwe, in its east end. Historically lower middle class, it has long been among the city's most diverse areas, attracting British, Greek and Portuguese immigrants in the post war era. This was followed by an influx of black and coloured Zimbabweans (mixed race) and immigrants from Mozambique, Malawi and the DRC after 1980. By 2012, its white population had shrunk to less than 15% from 63% in the early 1980s. The neighbourhood is located just east of the CBD, across from the neighbourhoods of Newlands and Highlands, and just north of Braeside and Hillside. To the east of Eastlea are the suburbs of Greendale and Msasa Park. Eastlea is a relatively small area with a high population density.

== History ==
Lying just east of the city centre, in 1913, Eastlea was incorporated as a part of the municipality of Salisbury. Originally a desirable location for middle class residents who wished to live at a distance from downtown, it soon lost its prestige to nearby Highlands, becoming instead a destination for lower middle class whites of mostly British heritage. Following the economic boom of the Federation of Rhodesia and Nyasaland, it later saw a large influx of Greek and Portuguese immigrants and became the main Greek hub in the capital. A legacy from this era is the Hellenic Club of Harare, a hub of the local Greek community. Few black residents lived in the area during this period, beyond domestic workers, due to laws such as the Vagrant Act of 1960, that tied residence to employment in a particular area.

After independence, Eastlea's relative affordability attracted many upwardly mobile black Zimbabweans, becoming a destination for students, young professionals and civil servants in large part due to its proximity to downtown.

Eastlea, Milton and The Avenues have long been considered to have a fairly common social makeup. Historically, Milton Park was occupied predominantly by recently arrived blue-collar workers from Britain while the Avenues and Eastlea attracted Southern Europeans, mostly Greeks and Portuguese (via Mozambique and Madeira), who worked in factories in Willowvale and Southerton or in the city centre. Today these neighbourhoods have a population of varied ethnicity and social class, though many former white residents have long since moved away, to be replaced by young professionals, young families making the area ripe for gentrification.

== Demographics ==
Eastlea is a lower middle class, residential suburb with a highly diverse urban population. The cityscape and history of the community are rooted firmly in Eastlea's role as a home for new immigrants to the city and for its post-independence position as a destination for an upwardly-mobile black middle class, many of whom work for non governmental organisations nearby. The neighbourhood is characterized by a mix of townhouses, apartments and single family homes. Housing tends to be more dense than the affluent northern suburbs. It is a predominantly residential neighbourhood with considerable appeal to a wide variety of Harareans, owing principally to its ethnic diversity, proximity to the urban core of the city, and wide variety of commercial and public services.

Unofficially the suburb is divided into northern and southern areas with the A5 highway serving as the bisecting line. Owing to its history, the northern is highly diverse and middle class, with the bulk of the area's institutions and amenities, such as the Eastlea Shopping Centre.

The southern half developed during the interwar and post-WW2 era and is more varied in terms of housing styles, income levels, cultures and spoken languages. Generally speaking, Eastlea is associated with Harare's multi-ethnic, middle-class, given the presence of major institutions such as Churchill School, the Hellenic Club of Harare and the Chapman Golf Club.

Eastlea first rose to prominence as an important middle-class suburb towards the mid century, initially populated by the (then) white-collar workforce and accessible via bus and road to and from the city centre. As widespread suburbanisation developed in the post-war period, affluent anglophone whites moved east and north to wealthier suburbs and Eastlea became home to successive waves of immigrants, first working class Britons (and a mostly anglophone white South African cohort), then from Greece, Cyprus and Portugal, and more recently from Mozambique, Malawi and China. Concurrently, black Zimbabweans were attracted to Eastlea, and many coloured families were drawn to the area from their traditional suburbs (nearby Braeside and Hillside) replacing many older whites.

In recent years, Eastlea has developed into a highly desirable neighbourhood for young professionals, exacerbating income inequality in the area, given the city's high unemployment rate, though almost all the gentrification has been concentrated in the northeast of the suburb bordering the more affluent Newlands.

== Cityscape ==
Eastlea is one of the city's major mixed use areas, defined in part by major civic institutions, NGO presence and small businesses anchoring its eastern and western ends. These include St. Catherine's Children's Hospital, the Grain Marketing Board and the National Employment Council. Schools, most notably Churchill High and Roosevelt Girls High, libraries, churches, and parks are distributed throughout the suburb. There are a variety of housing styles found in the area, in contrast to most Harare suburbs which favour single family homes. Adding to its appeal, Eastlea is well known for its tree-lined streets and high level of walkability.

Eastlea is a mixed-income urban area populated by young professionals. Its services including parks, schools, clinics, and major institutions provide facilities for families near the Central Business District. The area contains varied housing styles that retain mid-20th-century architecture. Eastlea is connected to most parts of Harare by roads, public buses, and commuter taxis (known locally as kombis).

== Notable features ==
The most notable institutions in Eastlea include:

- Churchill School
- St Catherine's Hospital
- The Grain Marketing Board
- National Employment Council (NEC)
- Chapman Golf Club
- Roosevelt Girls High School
- Hellenic Club of Harare

== See also ==
- Milton Park, Harare
- The Avenues, Harare
- Greeks in Zimbabwe
