= John Plagis =

Southern Rhodesian WWII flying ace (1919–1974)

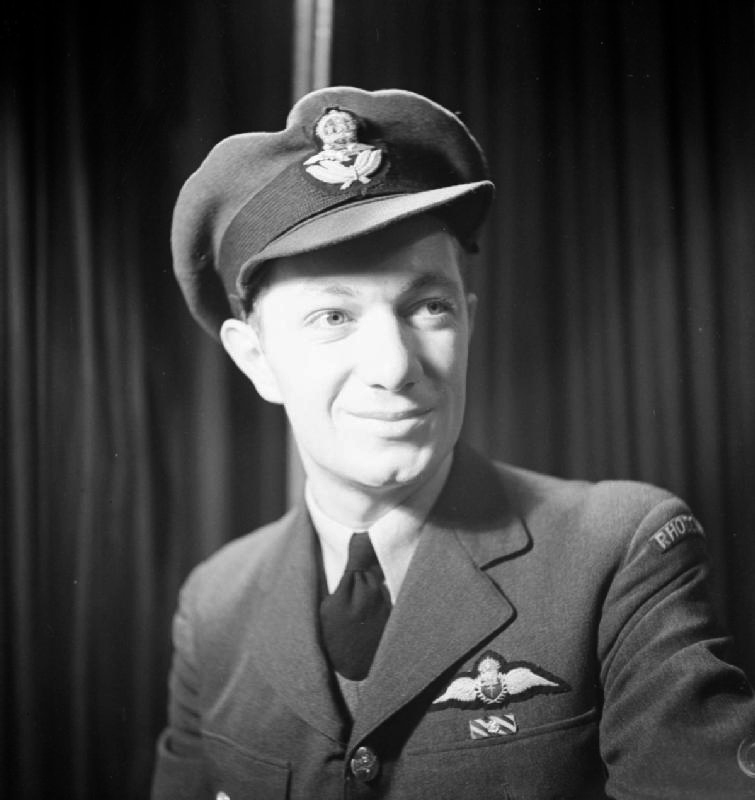
- Plagis in England, c. July 1942
- Born: Ioannis Agorastos Plagis; 10 March 1919; Gadzema, Southern Rhodesia
- Died: 1974 (aged 54–55); Rhodesia
- Military career
- Allegiance: Colony of Southern Rhodesi; United Kingdom
- Branch: Royal Air Force
- Service years: 1941–1948
- Rank: Wing Commander
- Service number: 80227
- Units: No. 65 Squadron (1941); No. 266 Squadron (1941–42); No. 249 Squadron (1942); No. 185 Squadron (1942)
- Commands: No. 64 Squadron (1943–44); No. 126 Squadron (1944–45); Bentwaters Wing (1945); No. 266 Squadron (1946–47)
- Conflicts: Second World War
- Awards: Distinguished Service Order; Distinguished Flying Cross & Bar; Airman's Cross (Netherlands)
- Other work: Businessman; electoral candidate for the Rhodesian Front in 1962; director of Central African Airways

Ioannis Agorastos "John" Plagis, (Note: Greek: Ιωάννης Αγοραστός "Γιάννης" Πλαγής.) DSO, DFC & Bar (1919–1974) was a Southern Rhodesian flying ace in the Royal Air Force (RAF) during the Second World War, noted especially for his part in the defence of Malta during 1942. The son of Greek immigrants, he was accepted by recruiters only after Greece joined the Allies in late 1940. Following spells with No. 65 Squadron and No. 266 (Rhodesia) Squadron, he joined No. 249 (Gold Coast) Squadron in Malta in March 1942. Flying Spitfire Mk Vs, Plagis was part of the multinational group of Allied pilots that successfully defended the strategically important island against numerically superior Axis forces over the next few months. Flying with No. 185 Squadron from early June, he was withdrawn to England in early July 1942.

After a spell as an instructor in the UK, Plagis returned to action in September 1943 as commander of No. 64 Squadron, flying Spitfire Mk VCs over northern France. He took command of No. 126 (Persian Gulf) Squadron in June 1944, and led many attacks on German positions during the invasion of France and the campaign that followed; he was shot down over Arnhem during Operation Market Garden, but only lightly wounded. After converting to Mustang IIIs, he commanded a wing based at RAF Bentwaters that supported bombing missions. He finished the war with the rank of squadron leader and remained with the RAF afterwards, operating Gloster Meteors at the head of No. 266 (Rhodesia) Squadron.

Plagis was the top-scoring Southern Rhodesian ace of the war, and the highest-scoring ace of Greek origin, with 16 confirmed aerial victories, including 11 over Malta. Awarded the Distinguished Service Order and other medals, he was also one of Rhodesia's most decorated veterans. The Southern Rhodesian capital, Salisbury, honoured his wartime contributions by naming a street in its northern Alexandra Park neighbourhood after him. On his return home after retiring from the RAF with the rank of wing commander in 1948, he set up home at 1 John Plagis Avenue, opened a bottle store bearing his name, and was a director of several companies, including Central African Airways in the 1960s. He contested the Salisbury City constituency in the 1962 general election, standing for the Rhodesian Front, but failed to win. He died in 1974.

== Early life ==
John Plagis was born on 10 March 1919 in Gadzema, a mining village near Hartley, about 110 kilometres (68 mi) south-west of the Southern Rhodesian capital Salisbury. His parents, Agorastos and Helen Plagis, were Greek immigrants from the island of Lemnos; he had five siblings. Christened with the Greek name Ioannis Agorastos, Plagis used the English form of Ioannis, John, from childhood, and attended Prince Edward School in Salisbury.

Having been interested in aviation since he was a boy, Plagis volunteered for the Southern Rhodesian Air Force (SRAF) soon after the outbreak of war in September 1939. He was turned down because he was the son of foreign nationals and therefore not a citizen, despite having lived in Rhodesia all his life. After Italy invaded Greece in late October 1940, bringing the Greeks into the war on the Allied side, Plagis applied again—this time to join the Royal Air Force, which had absorbed the SRAF in April 1940—and was accepted. Training first in Southern Rhodesia, then England, Plagis passed out with the rank of flight sergeant in June 1941 with above-average ratings in all of his flying assessments.

Though he was officially in the RAF as a Greek (he became a Rhodesian citizen only after the war), Plagis considered himself a Rhodesian flyer and wore shoulder flashes on his uniform denoting him as such. He named each aircraft he piloted during the war after his sister Kay, and painted that name on the side of each cockpit. After briefly flying Spitfires with No. 65 Squadron RAF, Plagis joined No. 266 (Rhodesia) Squadron, an almost all-Rhodesian Spitfire unit, on 19 July 1941. He served in the UK for about half a year, during which he was commissioned as a pilot officer, before being posted to the Mediterranean theatre in January 1942.

== Air war in Europe and the Mediterranean ==
=== First tour of operations ===
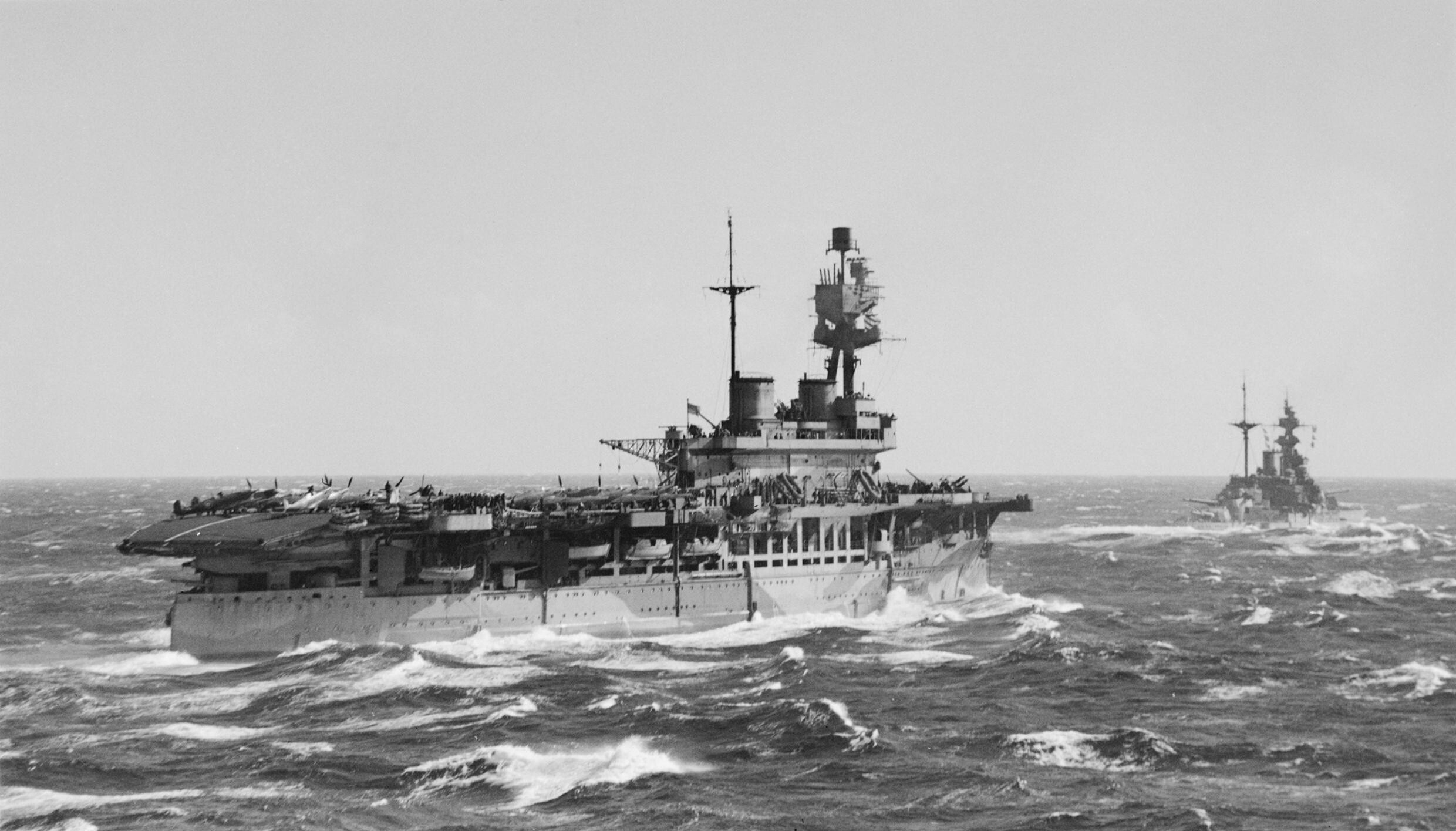
HMS Eagle (left) and HMS Malaya during Operation Spotter, the first of 13 reinforcements of Malta with Spitfires and pilots, on 7 March 1942. Plagis flew one of the Spitfires from Eagle.

Plagis's first major operation was Operation Spotter, the first of many British endeavours to reinforce the besieged island of Malta in the face of German and Italian assaults during the Battle of the Mediterranean. Malta was considered to be of vital strategic importance, and its defence was looking increasingly precarious in March 1942. Spotter was a plan to strengthen its British garrison with 16 new Spitfire Mk Vs, which would be carried part of the way from Gibraltar on the aircraft carrier HMS Eagle, then flown to Malta; the pilots would then become part of the severely depleted No. 249 (Gold Coast) Squadron. The team of pilots comprised eight British airmen, four Australians, two New Zealanders and two Southern Rhodesians—Plagis and his close friend Pilot Officer Doug Leggo.

The operation, carried out on 7 March 1942, was largely successful and 15 of the 16 Spitfires reached Malta. (Note: The 16th was found to be faulty just before take-off, so it was left behind along with its pilot, Australian Flight Sergeant Jack Yarro.) Plagis and Leggo arrived to find a third Rhodesian, Flight Officer George "Buck" Buchanan, already attached to the squadron. A further delivery of 16 Spitfires, Operation Picket I, was attempted on 21 March, but this was less successful; only nine of the planes arrived. Thirteen Spitfire reinforcement operations were ultimately launched between March and October 1942, playing a key role in the siege. The Luftwaffe and the Italian Regia Aeronautica meanwhile attempted to bomb Malta into submission, turning the airfields into "a wilderness of craters, the docks ... a shambles, Valletta a mass of broken limestone ..."

The Luftwaffe launched a major attack against key Maltese airfields at dawn on 20 March. Leggo, who had not slept for over 24 hours, returned to the airfield in the early hours having spent the night with a girlfriend. As the German planes approached he was ordered to prepare to fly. Plagis attempted to stop his friend from going, but Leggo insisted on flying, and took off at 08:05 as part of a group of four Spitfires and 12 Hurricanes aiming to intercept a squadron of Messerschmitt Bf 109s. He was soon seen to be flying poorly. A German pilot noticed this and attacked Leggo from close range, seriously damaging his aircraft and forcing him to bail out. Another Bf 109 then swooped and either fired at Leggo or collapsed his parachute with its slipstream, causing him to fall to his death. When Plagis learned what had happened, he was inconsolable, holding himself responsible. In his journal, he vowed to "shoot down ten for Doug—I will too, if it takes me a lifetime".

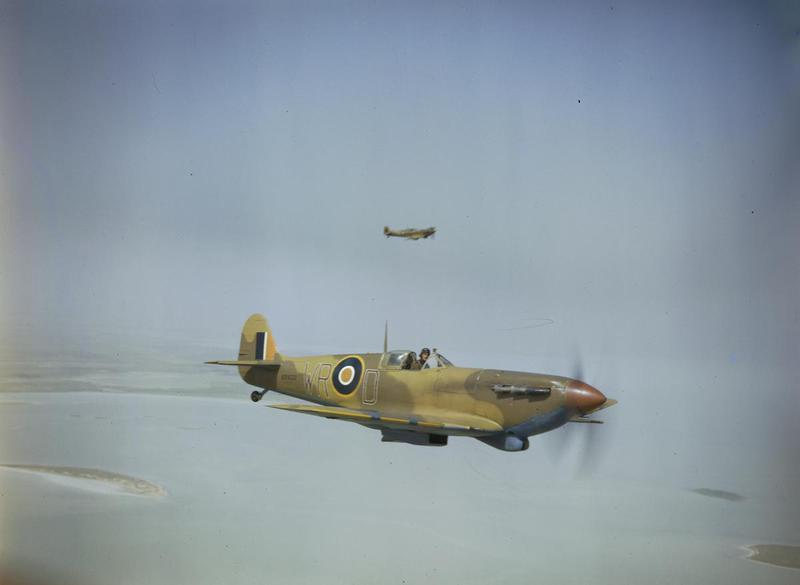
A Spitfire Mk V, as flown by Plagis over Malta with No. 249 Squadron

Plagis shot down his first enemy aircraft on 25 March 1942, and on 1 April achieved four more aerial victories in a single afternoon, thereby becoming the siege of Malta's first Spitfire ace. His downing of four enemies in a few hours won him much praise from superiors and reporters, and contributed to his growing reputation as an aggressive but skilful combat pilot. He was awarded the Distinguished Flying Cross (DFC) on 1 May 1942, the citation noting that he had "destroyed 4 and probably destroyed a further 3 hostile aircraft". "With complete indifference to odds against him, he presses home his attacks with skill and courage," it continued—"He has set an outstanding example."

On 11 May, Plagis attempted to down an Italian Reggiane Re.2001 by flying straight at it to ram it; taking erratic evasive manoeuvres, the Italian aircraft stalled and almost crashed into the sea. Thinking he had downed the enemy, Plagis claimed afterwards to have achieved an aerial victory without firing a shot, but the Italian flight reported no losses. Plagis's Spitfire was lightly hit during this engagement, and the Rhodesian had some luck returning safely; he landed with only three gallons (14 litres) of fuel left. On 16 May, Plagis and an English ace, Pilot Officer Peter Nash, destroyed a Bf 109 for a shared kill that became No. 249 Squadron's 100th victory over Malta. Amid the continuing siege, the need for a major supply convoy to Malta was becoming urgent; the Governor Lord Gort warned Britain in early June that if no supplies came by August, he would have to surrender to prevent a famine.

Plagis was promoted in the field to flight lieutenant on 4 June 1942 and transferred to No. 185 Squadron to command "B" Flight. He shot down two Re.2001s two days later to bring his tally of victories to ten (thereby fulfilling his pledge following Leggo's death), and destroyed a Bf 109 on 7 June. A month later, he received a Bar to his DFC, having been adjudged to have shown "exceptional skill and gallantry in combat ... Undeterred by superior numbers of attacking aircraft, he presses home his attacks with great determination." Plagis left Malta when his tour expired on 7 July 1942, flying first to Gibraltar, then the UK. The British finally delivered vital supplies to Malta on 15 August with Operation Pedestal (known in Malta as the "Santa Marija Convoy").

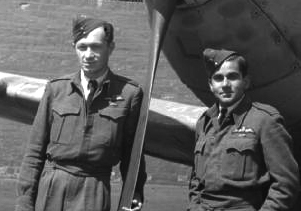
Plagis (left) as commander of No. 64 Squadron, with fellow Malta veteran A J Hancock. RAF Hornchurch, England, c. 1943–44

On arriving in England, Plagis was found to be suffering from malnutrition, scabies and physical and mental fatigue. He briefly convalesced in a nursing home, then spent a year as an instructor in England. He was promoted to probationary flying officer on 1 October 1942.

=== Second tour of operations ===
Plagis returned to action in September 1943, when he was appointed commanding officer of No. 64 Squadron, then flying Spitfire Mk VCs over northern France from RAF Coltishall in Norfolk. Plagis downed a Bf 109 over France on 24 September 1943, then a Focke-Wulf Fw 190 on 23 November, and formally received the rank of flight lieutenant on 8 December 1943.

At the start of June 1944, Plagis assumed command of No. 126 (Persian Gulf) Squadron, flying Spitfire Mk IXs that had recently been moved from Malta to assist in the invasion of Normandy. Six of the squadron's planes had been purchased by the Persian Gulf Spitfire Fund, and duly named after the donating sheikdoms; Plagis's aircraft, which he chose because of the large letter "K" on its tail (echoing his sister's name), had "Muscat" painted in English and Arabic script on its side. He added to this a full rendering of "Kay" and other personal decorations.

After leading No. 126 Squadron on raids into Normandy during the Allied invasion, Plagis took part in many of the attacks on German positions in northern France and the Low Countries that followed over the next few months. He was shot down over Arnhem in the Netherlands during Operation Market Garden in September 1944, but suffered only minor injuries and quickly returned to action. He received the Distinguished Service Order on 3 November for his "participat[ion] in very many sorties during which much damage has been inflicted on ... [German] shipping, radio stations, oil storage tanks, power plants and other installations". The citation particularly stressed an engagement in which a small group of Allied fighters led by Plagis had taken on a far superior force of enemy aircraft and shot down five of them, Plagis himself downing two. Plagis was described as "a brave and resourceful leader whose example has proved a rare source of inspiration".

Plagis converted to Mustang IIIs along with the rest of his squadron at RAF Bentwaters in Suffolk during December 1944 and January 1945, and spent the rest of the war flying bomber escort missions at the head of Bentwaters Wing, which included No. 126 Squadron. He was promoted to squadron leader on 28 March 1945. Germany surrendered on 7 May, ending the war in Europe.

Plagis finished the war with a tally of 16 enemy aircraft confirmed destroyed (including two shared victories counted as half a kill each), two shared probably destroyed, six damaged and one shared damaged. This made him Southern Rhodesia's highest-scoring ace of the war, as well as the top-scoring ace of Greek origin. He was one of the most-decorated Southern Rhodesian servicemen of the war.

== Post-war service and later life ==
Plagis stayed with the RAF following the end of hostilities, and from September 1946 to December 1947 commanded No. 266 (Rhodesia) Squadron in England and Germany, flying Gloster Meteor F.3s. He was awarded the Airman's Cross by the government of the Netherlands in October 1946. After retiring from the military with the rank of wing commander, Plagis returned home to Southern Rhodesia in 1948. A street in the north Salisbury suburb of Alexandra Park had been named after him in recognition of his wartime exploits; he moved into the house at the end of the road, 1 John Plagis Avenue. He married in 1954 and had three sons and a daughter.

Plagis set up and ran a bottle store bearing his name in Salisbury, and was involved in several businesses during the next three decades, serving as a director on company boards, including Central African Airways from 1963 to 1968. He joined the Rhodesian Front on its formation in 1962, and was its candidate in Salisbury City in that year's general election, losing to the United Federal Party's John Roger Nicholson by 631 votes to 501. According to a report published by the Zimbabwe African National Union in 1969, Plagis was by then working in the office of the Rhodesian Prime Minister Ian Smith (himself a Second World War Spitfire pilot), with responsibility for the premier's written correspondence.

In later life, Plagis became a friend of British ace Douglas Bader, a prominent supporter of Rhodesia's Unilateral Declaration of Independence in 1965. Bader, Smith and Plagis often socialised. Plagis also knew L Ron Hubbard, the American founder of Scientology, who briefly relocated to Salisbury in 1966. Hubbard initiated numerous business schemes in Rhodesia, including the purchase of the Bumi Hills Hotel at Kariba. Plagis was one of two local businessmen who partnered with Hubbard in the Bumi Hills deal. He also sold Hubbard an interest in his holdings before the American was deported.

Plagis died in 1974, aged 54 or 55; according to Lauren St John, an author from Gadzema, he had taken his own life, having never truly readjusted to the civilian world.

== Notes and references ==
=== Newspaper and journal articles ===
- Charousis, Chariton (December 2010). Έλληνες Άσσοι σε Συμμαχικές Αεροπορίες κατά το Β΄ Παγκόσμιο Πόλεμο [Greek Aces in Allied Air Forces in World War II] (PDF). Aviation Review (in Greek). Athens: Hellenic Air Force: 114–127. Archived from the original (PDF) on 5 June 2015.
- King, H F (5 June 1947). "Five Days With B.A.F.O." Flight. London: 513–517.
- Thomas, Andrew (1 November 1993). "No. 266 (Rhodesia) Squadron, Royal Air Force". Scale Aircraft Modelling. 16 (1). Bletchley: Hall Park: 35–41.
- "U.S. Financier is Refused Residence Permit—Told to Leave by Next Monday" (PDF). The Chronicle. Bulawayo: Argus Group: 1. 14 July 1966. Archived from the original on 4 March 2016.
- "Millionaire in Bumi Hills Hotel Deal" (PDF). The Sunday Mail. Salisbury: Argus Group. 22 May 1966. Archived from the original on 12 August 2014.

=== Bibliography ===
- Francis, Martin (November 2008). The Flyer: British Culture and the Royal Air Force 1939–1945 (First ed.). Oxford: Oxford University Press. ISBN 978-0-19-927748-3.
- Latimer, Jon (October 2002). Alamein (First ed.). Cambridge, Massachusetts: Harvard University Press. ISBN 978-0-674-01016-1.
- Lucas, Laddie (October 1981). Flying Colours: The Epic Story of Douglas Bader (First ed.). London: Hutchinson. ISBN 978-0-09-146470-7.
- MacDonald, J F (1976) [1950]. The War History of Southern Rhodesia 1939–1945. Volume 2. Bulawayo: Books of Rhodesia. ISBN 978-0-86920-140-4.
- Nichols, Steve (September 2008). Malta Spitfire Aces. Osprey Aircraft of the Aces. Vol. 83 (First ed.). Oxford: Osprey Publishing. ISBN 978-1-84603-305-6.
- O'Hara, Vincent P (November 2012). In Passage Perilous: Malta and the Convoy Battles of June 1942. Twentieth-Century Battles (First ed.). Bloomington, Indiana: Indiana University Press. ISBN 978-0-253-00603-5.
- Parker, John (1972). Rhodesia: Little White Island. London: Pitman. ISBN 978-0-273-36167-1.
- Price, Alfred (2004) [1995]. Late Mark Spitfire Aces, 1942–45. Osprey Aircraft of the Aces. Vol. 5 (Fifth ed.). Oxford: Osprey Publishing. ISBN 978-1-85532-575-3.
- Salt, Beryl (March 2001). A Pride of Eagles: The Definitive History of the Rhodesian Air Force, 1920–1980. Weltevredenpark, South Africa: Covos Day Books. ISBN 978-0-620-23759-8.
- Shores, Christopher F; Cull, Brian; Malizia, Nicola (1991). Malta: the Spitfire Year, 1942. London: Grub Street Publishing. ISBN 978-0-948817-16-8.
- Shores, Christopher F; Williams, Clive (1966). Aces High: the Fighter Aces of the British and Commonwealth Air Forces in World War II. London: Neville Spearman Publishing. OCLC 654945475.
- St John, Lauren (July 2008) [2007]. Rainbow's End: A Memoir of Childhood, War and an African Farm (Second ed.). New York: Scribner. ISBN 978-0-7432-8680-0.
- Willson, F M G, ed. (1963). Source Book of Parliamentary Elections and Referenda in Southern Rhodesia, 1898–1962. Salisbury: Department of Government, University College of Rhodesia and Nyasaland. OCLC 2885579.
- Southern Rhodesia: Past and Present. Salisbury: Government of Southern Rhodesia. 1945. OCLC 5062140.
- Who's Who of Southern Africa. Cape Town: Ken Donaldson. 1973. OCLC 1769850.
- Zimbabwe News. Volume 4, Issues 1–16. Lusaka: Zimbabwe African National Union. 1969. OCLC 3249703.
