= List of international presidential trips made by Emmerson Mnangagwa =

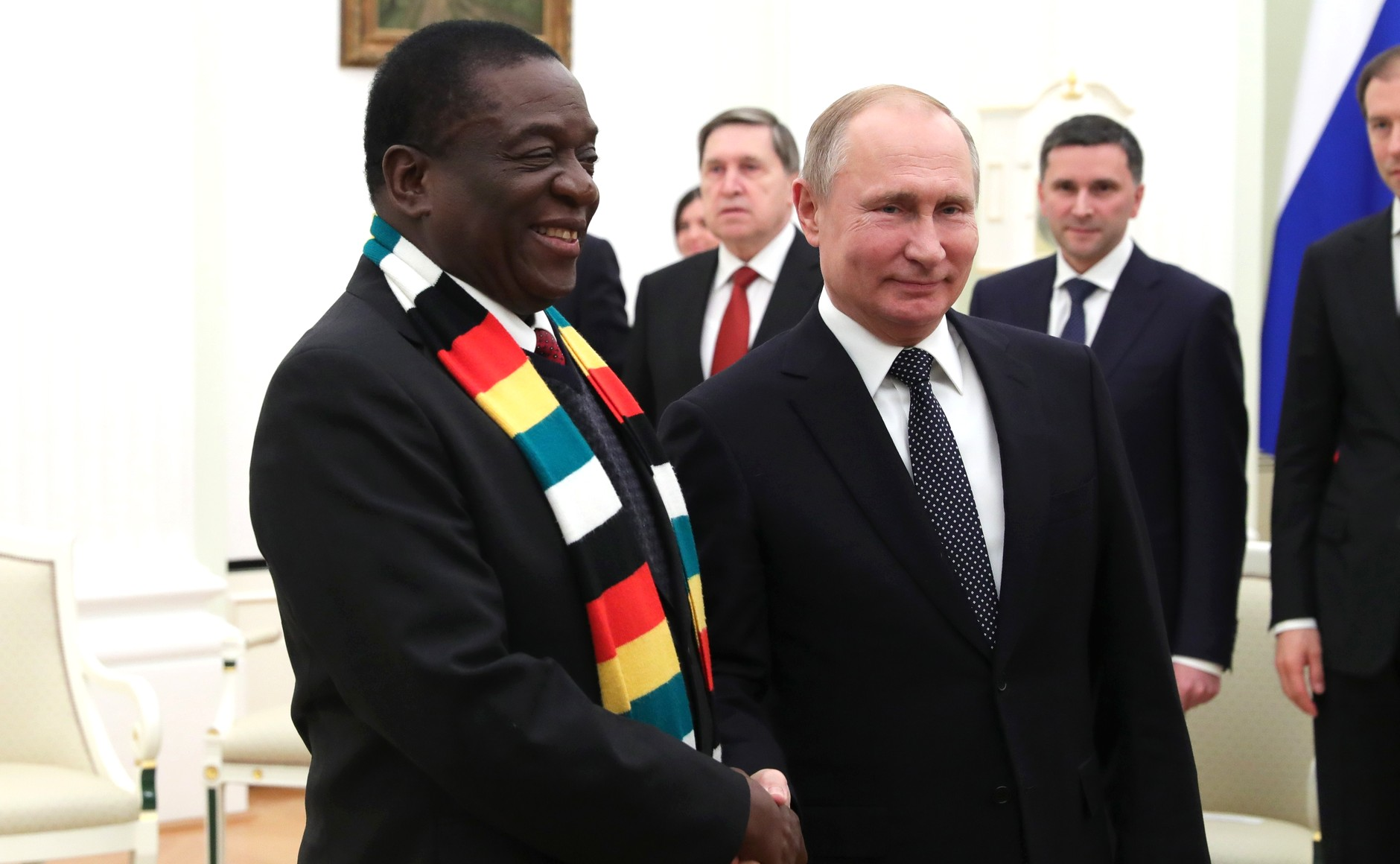
Vladimir Putin and Mnangagwa in the Kremlin, January 15, 2019.

The following is a list of international presidential trips made by Emmerson Mnangagwa who became the 3rd President of Zimbabwe on 24 November 2017 following the removal of his predecessor Robert Mugabe that year.

== 2017 ==
Country	Areas visited	Date(s)	Purpose(s)
South Africa	Pretoria	21 December	State visit

== 2018 ==
Country	Areas visited	Date(s)	Purpose(s)
Angola	Luanda	12 January	State visit
Namibia	Windhoek	15 January	State visit
Mozambique	Maputo	17 January	State visit
Switzerland	Davos	23–26 January	Working visit
Botswana	Gaborone	12 February	State visit
Democratic Republic of Congo	Kinshasa	1 March	Working visit
Rwanda	Kigali	20 March	Working visit
Ivory Coast	Abidjan	26–27 March	Working visit
China	Beijing	2–6 April	State visit
Namibia	Windhoek	16 August	Attended the 38th SADC Summit.
Zambia	Lusaka	23 October	Attemded the 54th independence day celebrations.
Ethiopia	Addis Ababa	16 November	11th Session of the Assembly Of Heads Of State & Government Of the African Union.

== 2019 ==
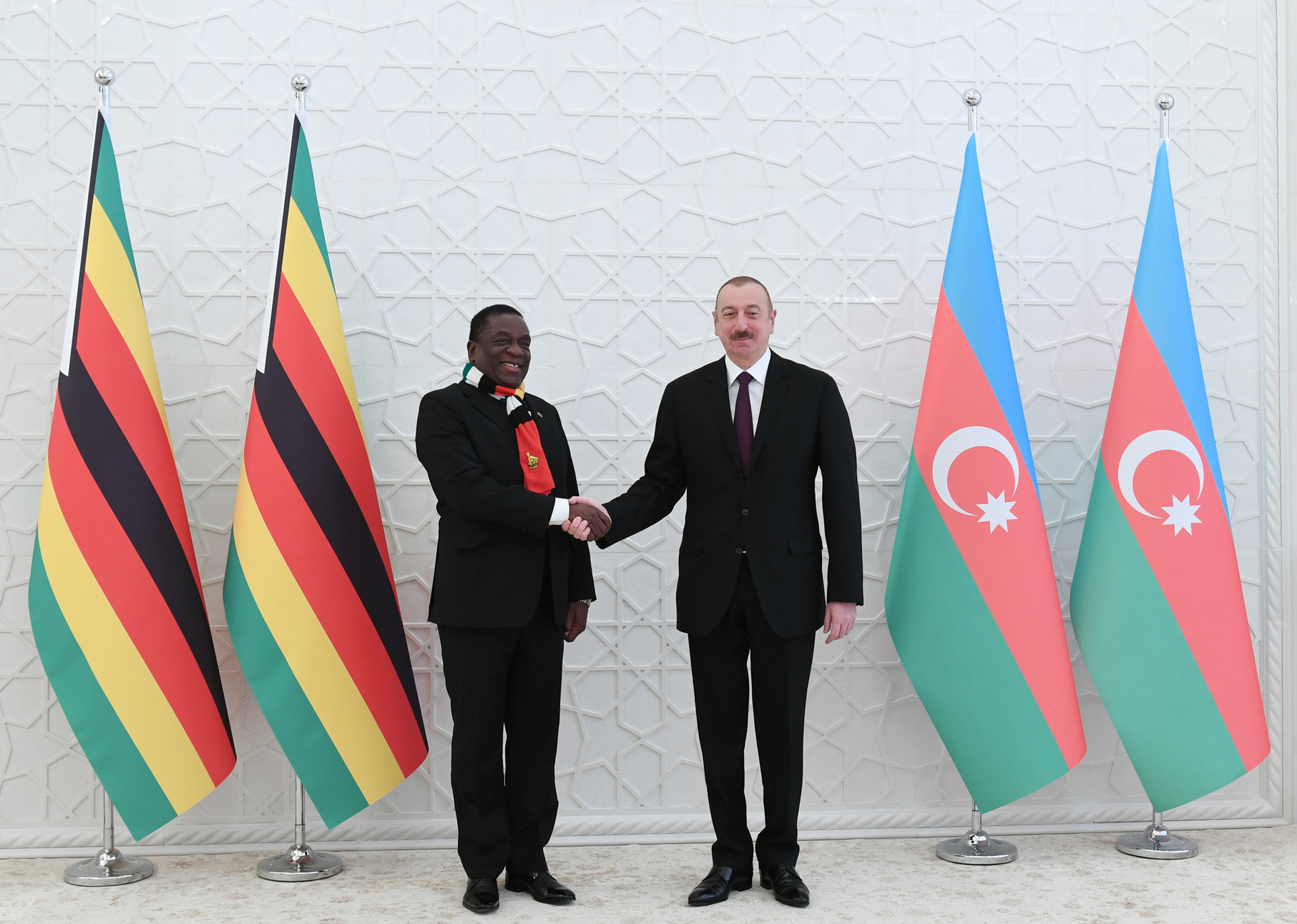
Mnangagwa with Ilham Aliyev.

Country	Areas visited	Date(s)	Purpose(s)
Russia	Moscow	15–16 January	State visit. Held talks with President Vladimir Putin at the Moscow Kremlin and oversaw the signing of agreements and memoranda of understanding on mining, agriculture, education, trade, infrastructure development, rail transport, and investment cooperation.
Belarus	Minsk	17–19 January	State visit. Opened the consulate of Zimbabwe in Minsk
Azerbaijan	Baku	18–19 January	Working visit
Kazakhstan	Astana	19 January	State visit
UAE	Abu Dhabi	16 March	State visit
Namibia	Windhoek	25 July	State visit
South Africa	Cape Town	4–6 September	State visit
Uganda	Kampala	8–10 October	Attended Ugandan Independence Day celebrations.
Russia	Sochi	21––23 October	Attended the 1st Russia-Africa Summit.

== 2020 ==
Country	Areas visited	Date(s)	Notes
Mozambique	Maputo	15 January	Attended the inauguration of President Filipe Nyusi.

== 2021 ==
Country	Areas visited	Date(s)	Notes
United Kingdom	Glasgow	1–2 November	Attended the 2021 United Nations Climate Change Conference (COP26).

== 2022 ==
Country	Areas visited	Date(s)	Notes
United Arab Emirates	Dubai	13–15 March	Participated in business and investment events held alongside Expo 2020 Dubai.
Equatorial Guinea	Malabo	28 May	Attended the 16th Extraordinary Session of the Assembly of the African Union on terrorism and unconstitutional changes of government.
Kenya	Nairobi	13 September	Attended the inauguration of President William Ruto.
Egypt	Sharm El-Sheikh	6–9 November	Attended the 2022 United Nations Climate Change Conference (COP27).

== 2023 ==
Country	Areas visited	Date(s)	Notes
Malawi	Lilongwe, Blantyre	31 May–2 June	State visit at the invitation of President Lazarus Chakwera. Held bilateral talks on trade, agriculture, mining, tourism and investment and visited areas affected by Cyclone Freddy.
Russia	Saint Petersburg	27–28 July	Attended the 2nd Russia–Africa Summit.

== 2024 ==
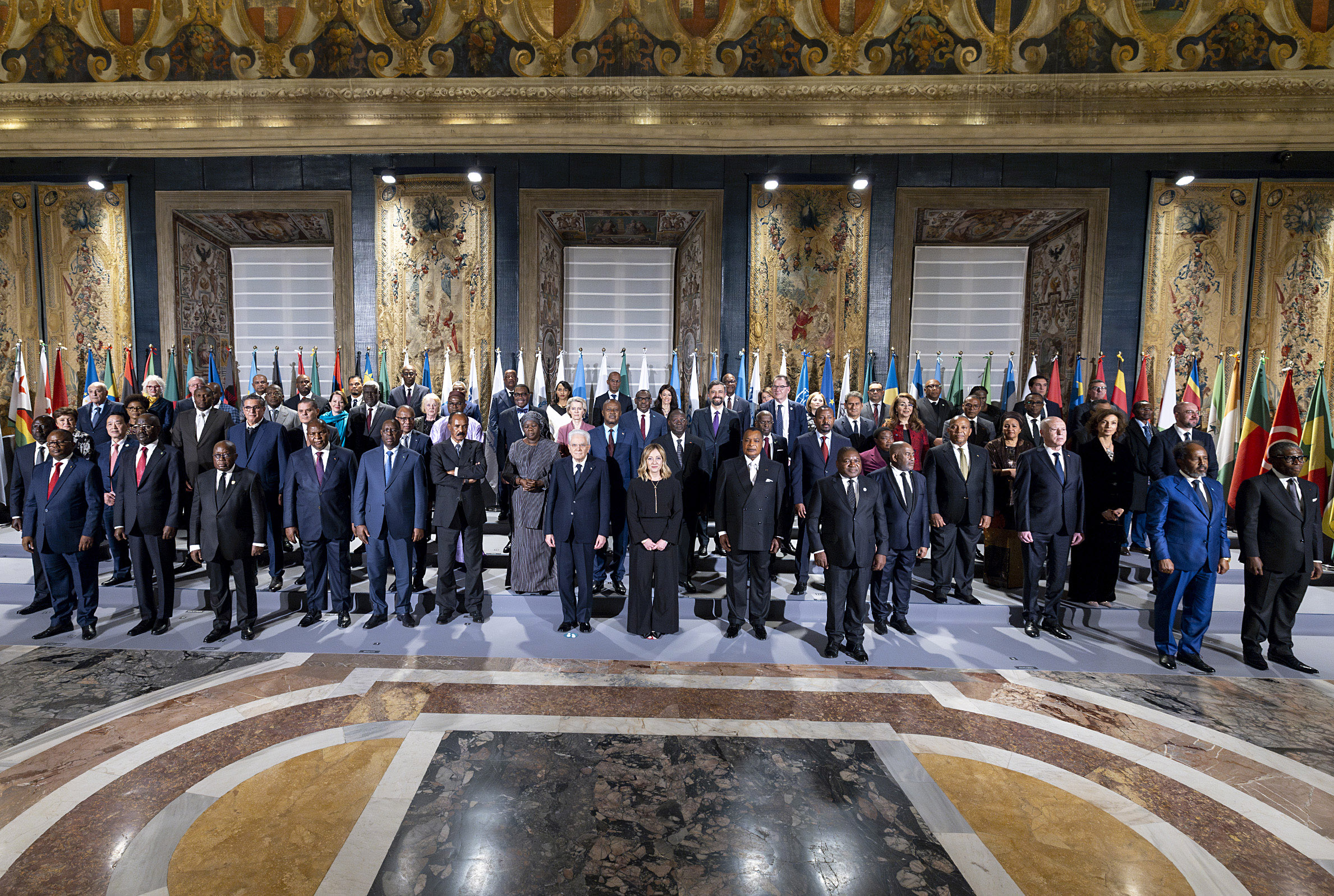
Group photo at the 2024 Italy–Africa Summit in Rome.

Country	Areas visited	Date(s)	Notes
Italy	Rome	28–29 January	Participated in the inaugural Italy–Africa Summit.
South Korea	Seoul	2–3 June	Participated in the inaugural South Korea-Africa Summit.
Russia	Saint Petersburg	5–8 June	Participated in the Saint Petersburg International Economic Forum.
China	Beijing	3–6 September	Attended the 2024 Summit of the Forum on China–Africa Cooperation (FOCAC) and held talks with President Xi Jinping.

== 2025 ==
Country	Areas visited	Date(s)	Notes
Japan	Yokohama	20–22 August	Attended the Ninth Tokyo International Conference on African Development (TICAD 9) to drive sustainable economic development and bolster trade relations. Engaged in bilateral meetings with Japanese Prime Minister Shigeru Ishiba.
China	Beijing	3–4 September	Traveled to Beijing to join global leaders in commemorating the 80th anniversary of the end of World War II (including the Victory Day military parade on 3 September) and held high-level bilateral discussions with Chinese President Xi Jinping.
Mozambique	Maputo	21–23 November	State visit to strengthen cooperation and secure Mozambique's support for Zimbabwe's non-permanent candidacy for the UN Security Council. Held the inaugural Bi-National Commission.

== 2026 ==
Mnangagwa and Vladimir Putin at the Third Russia–Africa Summit in Moscow, 28 October 2026

Country	Areas visited	Date(s)	Notes
United Arab Emirates	Dubai	1–5 February	Attended the World Governments Summit. Participated in a high-level panel discussion on Africa's future alongside the presidents of Botswana and Sierra Leone, moderated by American conservative political commentator Tucker Carlson. The trip formed part of Zimbabwe's re-engagement efforts.
Ghana	Accra	1–3 April	State visit. Toured the Sweden Ghana Medical Centre and finalized the memoranda of understanding (including 10 Government-to-Government agreements and one private sector agreement).
Eswatini	Lobamba	26-27 April	Working visit. To attend King Mswati III's double celebration marking his 58th birthday and the 40th anniversary of his reign.
Angola	Luanda	17–19 June	Participated as a distinguished guest at the Global Tourism Forum Angola Investment Summit 2026. The event focused on tourism-led economic development, investment, and regional cooperation across Africa.
South Africa	Durban	16–17 August	Attended the 46th SADC Summit.
South Africa	Pretoria	21 August	Met with President Cyril Ramaphosa for the Fourth Session of the South Africa–Zimbabwe Bi-National Commission.
United States	New York City	19–25 September	Attended the 81st session of the United Nations General Assembly. He also attended the Zimbabwe Business Forum that's aimed at unlocking financing for key sectors.
Russia	Moscow	28–29 October	Attended the third Russia–Africa Summit as chairperson of the Common Market for Eastern and Southern Africa (COMESA). He sought Russian investment in energy, mining, agriculture and digital technology.

== See also ==
- Foreign relations of Zimbabwe
