= Ismail ibn Musa Menk =

Zimbabwean scholar (born 1975)

Mufti Ismail Ibn Musa Menk
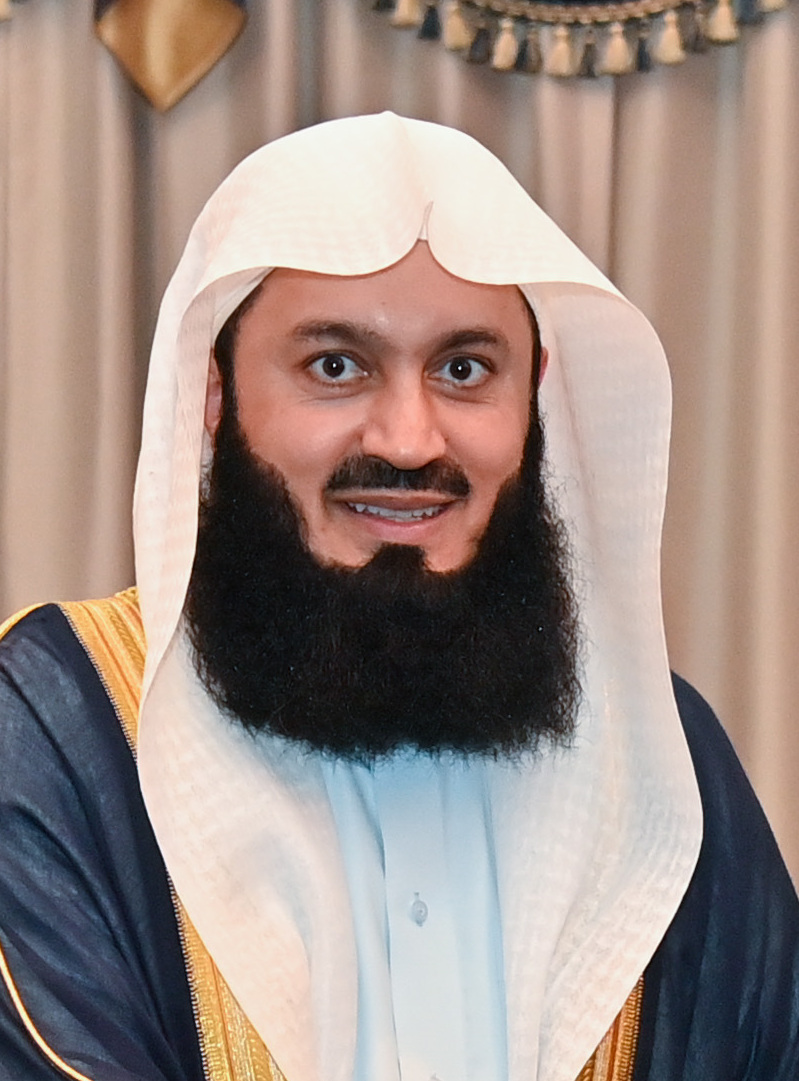
- Menk in 2022
- Born: 27 June 1975 (age 51); Salisbury, Rhodesia (present-day Harare, Zimbabwe)
- Occupations: Motivational speaker, Islamic scholar, Grand Mufti
- Era: Contemporary
- Notable work: Motivational Moments
- Honors: The 500 Most Influential Muslims (2010 - 2026)

Grand Mufti of Zimbabwe

Personal life
- Education: Kantharia Darul Uloom, Islamic University of Madinah
- Website: muftimenk.com

Religious life
- Religion: Sunni Islam

Senior posting
- Awards: KSBEA 2015 Awards for Social Guidance, 2015

YouTube information
- Channel: Mufti Menk
- Years active: 2010–present
- Subscribers: 6.34 million
- Views: 764.1 million
- Last updated: 1 November 2026

Ismail ibn Musa Menk (born 27 June 1975), commonly known as Mufti Menk, is an Islamic preacher, scholar and cleric who is an Islamic scholar of Zimbabwe, and head of the fatwa department for the Council of Islamic Scholars of Zimbabwe.

== Early life ==
Ismail ibn Musa Menk was born on 27 June 1975 in Salisbury, Rhodesia to Indo-Zimbabwean parents of Gujarati origin. He undertook his initial studies with his father, memorizing the Quran and learning Arabic. He went to St. John's College (Harare) for senior school. He studied Jurisprudence and Sharia in Madinah. He specialised post grad in the Hanafi school of thought in Darul Uloom Kantharia in Gujarat, India. Menk has been identified as a Deobandi as well as a Salafi.

== Views ==
Menk opposes terrorism and has pledged his aid in curbing religious extremism in the Maldives. On 31 March 2018, he urged Muslims to avoid Muslim—Christian violence, arguing that Muslims and Christians are brothers and sisters from one father, the prophet Adam. He blames western media for misleading the world that Muslims are terrorists. According to Gulf News, Menk said that everyone on this earth is a part of a family and has one maker, therefore, no one has the right to force any belief or faith on another.

== Works ==
In 2018, he published a collection of his sayings as a book titled Motivational Moments and in 2019 published the second edition, titled Motivational Moments 2.

=== Awards and recognition ===
- Menk was honoured with an Honorary Doctorate of Social Guidance by Aldersgate College, Philippines and its collaborative partner Aldersgate College – Dublin, Ireland on 16 April 2016.
- KSBEA 2015 Awards – Global Leadership Award in Social Guidance was awarded by the Cochin Herald.

=== Recognition ===
Mufti Ismail Menk has been listed in The 500 Most Influential Muslims—an annual publication by the Royal Islamic Strategic Studies Centre (Jordan)—every year since 2010. He appears under the “Preachers & Spiritual Guides” category, including the most recent 2026 edition.

== Controversies ==
=== Travel bans ===
On 31 October 2017, Singapore banned Menk from its borders because it believes he expresses views incompatible with its multicultural laws and policies. According to the Straits Times, he has asserted that "it is blasphemous for Muslims to greet believers of other faiths during festivals such as Christmas or Diwali". Singapore's Ministry of Home Affairs said in a statement that its decision to reject Menk's application for a short-term work pass stemmed from his "segregationist and divisive teachings". The Majlisul Ulama Zimbabwe, Menk's own institution, released a statement to express "regret and dismay" regarding the ban. It said that Menk was an "asset to multi‐cultural, multi‐religious Zimbabwe" and that viewers should "listen to his sermons in full" and not "edited clips of a few minutes" to see the moderate path he has chosen.

In November 2018, the Danish government banned Menk from entering its borders for 2 years.

=== On homosexuality ===
The Huffington Post reported that Menk denounced gay people as "filthy" in a YouTube video in which he denounced homosexuality and said that gay people are "worse than animals". In 2013, he was due to visit six British universities – Oxford, Leeds, Leicester, Liverpool, Cardiff and Glasgow – but the speaking tour was cancelled after student unions and university officials expressed concern about his views. Liverpool University stated that "it is not the role of the University to censor people's views, but rather to provide a neutral, open environment for them to be debated and challenged. The Guild of Students and the University have clear policies on diversity and equality, which inform our decisions on events such as this."
