= Eli Snyman =

Zimbabwean rugby union player

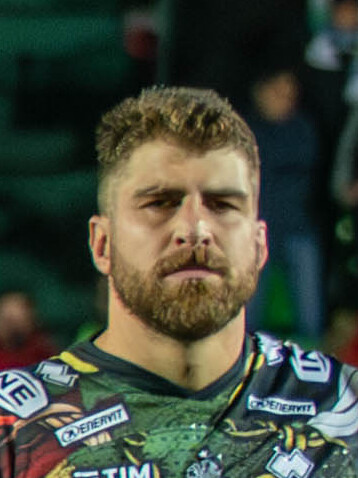
- Snyman in 2025
- Full name: Eli Colin Snyman
- Born: 25 January 1996 (age 30) Harare, Zimbabwe
- Height: 2.01 m (6 ft 7 in)
- Weight: 111 kg (17 st 7 lb; 245 lb)
- School: St. John's College
- University: University of Pretoria

Rugby union career
- Position: Lock
- Current team: Ulster
Youth career
- 2015–2017: Blue Bulls
Amateur team(s)
Years	Team	Apps	(Points)
2016–2017	UP Tuks	8	(0)
Senior career
Years	Team	Apps	(Points)
2016–2019	Blue Bulls XV	3	(0)
2016–2018	Blue Bulls	8	(0)
2019	Bulls	7	(0)
2019–2021	Benetton	26	(0)
2021–2023	Leicester Tigers	34	(5)
2023–2026	Benetton	49	(0)
2026–present	Ulster	5	(0)
- Correct as of 31 October 2026
International career
Years	Team	Apps	(Points)
2009	Zimbabwe Under-13	4	(5)
2014	Zimbabwe Under-18	3	(0)
2016	South Africa Under-20	5	(0)
- Correct as of 14 April 2018

Eli Colin Snyman (born 25 January 1996) is a Zimbabwean rugby union player for Irish team Ulster. He previously played for English Premiership Rugby side Leicester Tigers between 2021 and 2023. He also played for Benetton between 2019 and 2023 and for the Bulls and Blue Bulls in South Africa. In January 2026, Ulster Rugby announced that Snyman had signed a 2 year contract with the club which will commence in Summer 2026. His regular position is lock.

== Rugby union career ==
=== 2009–2014 : Schoolboy rugby union ===
Snyman was born in Harare, where he attended St. John's Preparatory School. In 2009, he was selected to represent Zimbabwe's Under-13 side in the South African Craven Week competition, starting all four of their matches in Kimberley.

At secondary school level, he attended St. John's College, and was once again selected to represent Zimbabwe at the Craven Week competition for high schools in 2014. He started all three of their matches at the tournament held in Middelburg.

=== 2015 : Blue Bulls Under-19 and Under-21 ===
Snyman's performances were noticed by the Blue Bulls and he signed an academy contract with the Pretoria-based side, joining their intake for the 2015 season. He was named in the Blue Bulls Under-19 squad that participated in the 2015 Under-19 Provincial Championship, chosen to be vice-captain and started eight of their twelve matches during the regular season of the competition. He scored one try in the competition, in a 42–24 victory over the Free State U19 team, helping the Blue Bulls to finish in second spot on the log to qualify for the semi-finals. Snyman also made one start and one appearance as a replacement for the Blue Bulls U21 team at the end of the Under-21 Provincial Championship, but rejoined the Under-19 team for the title-ply-offs. He started their 30–29 victory over Western Province in their semi-final match, as well as the final, but he could not prevent the Blue Bulls losing 23–25 the Eastern Province U19s. While missing out on silverware, he received a personal accolade, being named the Under-19 Forward of the Year at the Blue Bulls' end-of-season awards ceremony.

=== 2016–2019 : Blue Bulls, UP Tuks and South Africa Under-20 ===
At the start of 2016, Snyman linked up with UP Tuks – the Pretoria-based university side affiliated to the Blue Bulls academy – for the 2016 Varsity Cup competition. He started all of UP Tuks' matches in the competition; he made seven appearances during the regular season which saw Tuks qualify for the title play-offs by virtue of finishing in fourth position and also started the semi-final, which his side lost 11–49 to Maties in Stellenbosch.

In March 2016, Snyman was included in a South Africa Under-20 training squad, and made the cut to be named in a reduced provisional squad a week later. On 10 May 2016, he was included in the final squad for the 2016 World Rugby Under 20 Championship tournament to be held in Manchester, England. Snyman started all five of their matches in the competition; after a 59–19 come-from-behind victory over Japan in their opening match in Pool C of the tournament, South Africa were beaten 13–19 by Argentina in their second match, but bounced back to secure a 40-31 bonus-point victory over France in their final pool match to secure a semi-final place as the best runner-up in the competition. South Africa then faced three-time champions England in the semi-finals, but the hosts proved too strong for South Africa, knocking them out of the competition with a 39–17 victory. Another loss in their final match – 19–49 to Argentina in the third-place play-off – condemned South Africa to fourth place in the competition.

Upon his return to South African shores, Snyman was named in the Blue Bulls squad for the 2016 Currie Cup qualification series and he made his domestic first class debut by coming on as a replacement in a 95–12 victory over Namibian side the Welwitschias in their final match in the competition. Snyman's debut in the Premier Division of the Currie Cup followed less than a month later, when he came on for the final thirteen minutes of their 45–26 victory over Western Province.

Snyman was named in Super Rugby side the Bulls' extended training squad for the 2017 season.

=== 2019–2021 Benetton ===
Snyman joined Italian Pro14 side Benetton for the 2019–20 Pro14 and 2020–21 Pro14 seasons.

=== 2021– Leicester Tigers ===
It was announced on March 8, 2021 that Snyman would join Leicester Tigers for the 2021-22 season. Snyman made his debut for Leicester on 18 September 2021 as a substitute in a 34-19 win against Exeter Chiefs.

=== 2023 Return to Benetton ===
Snyman returned to Italian United Rugby Championship club Benetton on a three-year contract from the 2023–24 season.

=== Ulster ===
In January 2026 Ulster Rugby announced that Snyman would join ahead of the 2026-27 season on a 2-year deal.
