= Marjorie Ngwenya =

British-born, Zimbabwean-raised actuary

Marjorie Ngwenya is a British-born, Zimbabwean-raised actuary. In June 2016, she was appointed president-elect of UK’s Institute and Faculty of Actuaries (IFoA). She was the first black African, the youngest (under 40) and third woman to hold this position. She was also known to be the first leader based outside the United Kingdom.

== Early years ==
Ngwenya was born in the United Kingdom but was raised in Zimbabwe.

Like many Africans, she has a rich and blended heritage. Her paternal ancestors, known by the family name Mokoena, hailed from Lesotho. Her great grandfather was coerced into adopting the Zulu name Ngwenya and the family later settled in a Shona-speaking part of Zimbabwe.

Her father trained and worked as a metallurgist/minerals engineer and her mother as a psychiatric nurse.

== Education ==
Ngwenya attended Chisipite Senior School in Harare, where she acquired her advanced level education. Initially she wanted to become a pilot and later succeeded in gaining admission to study Actuarial Science at the London School of Economics but she could not complete due to currency problems in Zimbabwe. She later qualified as an actuary while working. She holds a sloan master's degree in Leadership and Strategy from the London Business School.

== Career ==
The Britain's House of Common's Treasury Committee Approved Appointment of Marjorie Ngwenya to the Bank of England’s Prudential Regulation Committee, effective 5 September 2022 for a three-year term.

She is currently an independent non-executive director at Tangerine Life in Nigeria and its holding company Tangerine Financial, registered in the United Kingdom.

She has held various global leadership positions. In her earlier years she worked with Deloitte as a tax advisor and actuarial manager, Swiss Re in London as a Senior Risk Actuary, Mazars in London as a director, as editor of the Actuary magazine, as Chief Risk Officer of Old Mutual Africa in Johannesburg and as Group Strategy Executive at Liberty in South Africa. In June 2016, she was elected president of the Institute and Faculty of Actuaries by the IFoA Council. She served briefly on the Monetary Policy Committee of the Reserve Bank of Zimbabwe (2019/2020).

In addition to being a board member for several financial services and not-for-profit institutions, she is a leadership and life purpose coach, an author and a motivational speaker.
