= Ansif Ashraf =

Indian businessman (1983–2021)

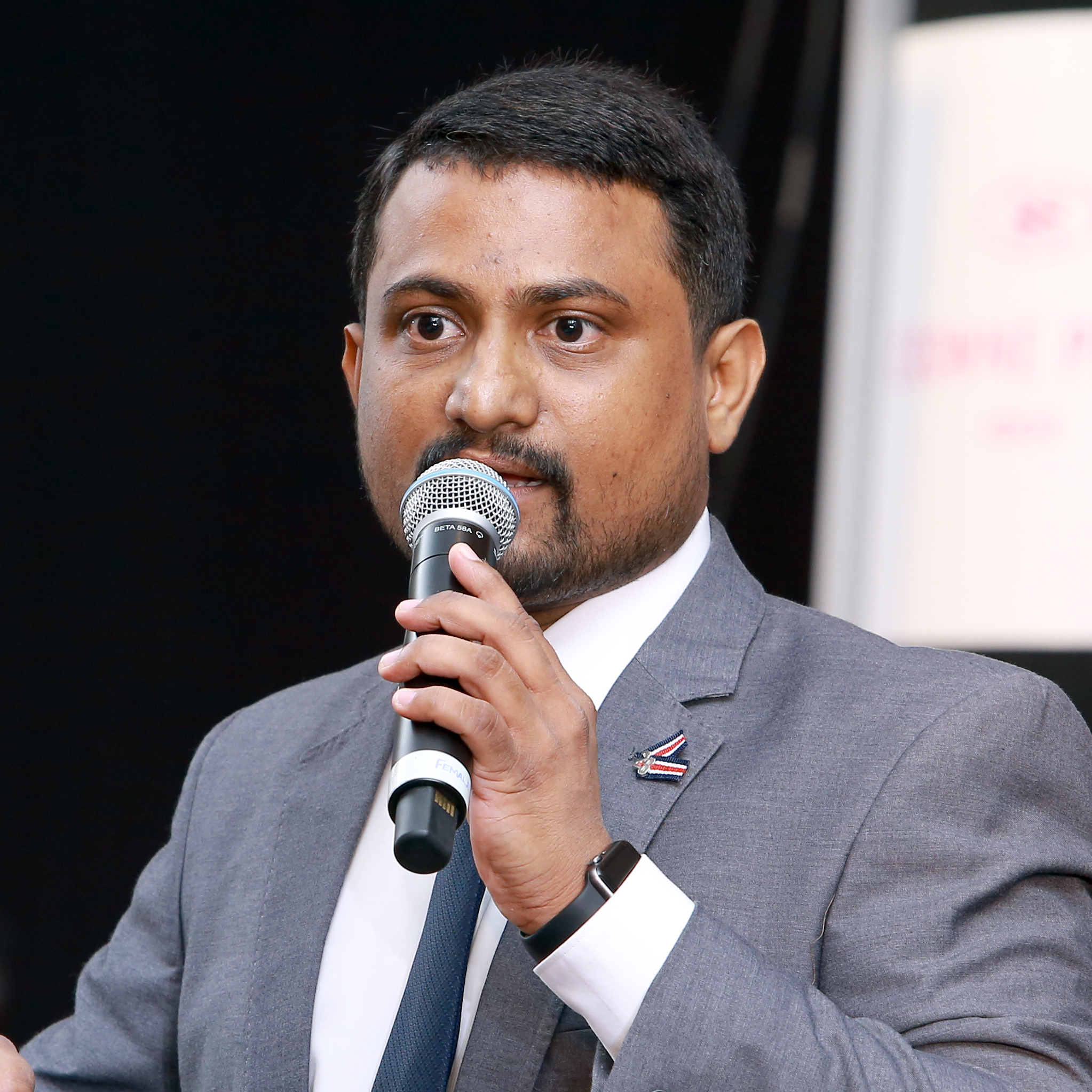
- Ansif Ashraf talking at Kerala State Business Excellence Awards 2016
- Born: 15 November 1983; Thane, Maharashtra, India
- Died: 27 January 2021 (aged 37)
- Education: Mahatma Gandhi University; Cochin College
- Occupation: Chief Editor of Cochin Herald
- Spouse: Ramzeen Ansif

Ansif Ashraf (15 November 1983 – 27 January 2021) was an Indian businessman who was the editor-in-chief of the Cochin Herald.

== Early life ==
Ansif Ashraf was born in Thane, Maharashtra, and moved to Kochi in Kerala with his family in the early 1990s. His father was one of the founders of the Cochin Herald newspaper.

== Career ==
He started his career as a graphic designer from home in 2000. In 2001 he started a studio for photography and designing. In 2006 he founded Paradise Group, which was a trading company engaged in business of Rubber and Carbon Black. In 2008 he founded AGI Holdings Limited which was engaged in selling Centrifuge Separators.

In 2011, Ansif Ashraf gained control of the Cochin Herald, turning it into a business magazine.

Ansif was one of the founders of Young Chamber of Commerce, an organisation for connecting young entrepreneurs and established companies in Kochi, in 2014. He started the opportunity exchange platform with Young Chamber of Commerce. In 2017 the name of the chamber was changed from Young Chamber of Commerce to Crescent Chamber of Commerce and Industry.

In 2017, Ansif Ashraf founded Fly With Me Mobile App LLP, a company where he was the CEO.

On 21 February 2018, the family of A. P. J. Abdul Kalam, former President of India, appointed Ansif Ashraf as Kerala State Co-ordinator for the A. P. J. Abdul Kalam International Foundation. and later that year, he became the Secretary General of the Kerala chapter of the foundation.

In 2018, he bought Herald Media Network Limited, which owns the brand name British Herald, and founded a magazine by the same name. In 2019, a number of news outlets in India re-published the results of a survey first published by British Herald, which claimed that Narendra Modi was considered to be "the world's most powerful leader". Major publishers such as Zee News and News 18 referred to British Herald as "a leading British magazine". However, investigations by the fact-checking websites Alt News and BOOM Live showed that it was a relatively obscure website and that there was no information about the survey, which led to criticism of the way several large media houses had re-posted the news without checking its origin. Ashraf stated to BOOM Live that British Herald had not in fact claimed to be a "leading British magazine".

== Death ==
Ansif Ashraf died from COVID-19 on Wednesday, 27 January 2021, in Sharjah, UAE. He was 37.
