= Belgravia, Harare =

Residential area in Harare, Zimbabwe

Coordinates: 17°48′21″S 31°02′23″E

Belgravia is a mixed use residential suburb in the north of Harare, Zimbabwe. It is named for the eponymous commercial area of Belgravia in London. It is bounded by the larger neighbourhoods of Milton Park, Avondale and Kensington, to the south and northwest respectively, as well as Alexandra Park to the east. The suburb is can be considered a transitionary area between inner city districts like Milton Park and the leafier suburbs to the north.

It is home to a number of commercial businesses and governmental organizations along with the nearby Causeway district in the CBD. It is frequently referred to as part of the city's embassy row.

== History ==
When Harare was founded in the early 1890s, the Belgravia area, was largely undeveloped because it lay beyond what is now the A1 highway and thus outside the city limits, which began to be subdivided for urban development. It was only in 1902, that the original tract of land- Avondale farm- was subdivided for residential settlement thus becoming the city's first residential suburb. The area of Avondale farm now comprises Avondale, Belgravia and Kensington.

Gentrification and a general commercialisation of the area accelerated in the 1980s and 1990s, driven by businesses moving out from the congested city centre and today the area is now a more mainstream and trendy location with offices, cafes, restaurants, bars, and retail stores, though many leafy residential areas remain.

== Character ==
The neighborhood is home to the University of Zimbabwe, College Of Health Sciences, the British Council, the World Food Programme, Blackston School, Lions Clubs International among others.

Belgravia should not be confused with the neighbouring Kensington and the larger Avondale to its west, which it shares numerous commercial areas with: although both are part of the original tract of land on which Avondale farm was developed in 1911, they are in fact separate neighborhoods.

=== Layout ===
Unusually among the city's urban neighbourhoods, Belgravia's demographics change dramatically within a few streets. Wealthier people live near the embassies and towards the north and east of the suburb, but closer to the university and Milton Park, one finds more students, young professionals, young families, immigrants and street vendors with more diversified income levels. Housing in the southern and western end of Belgravia includes townhouses, flats, modest privately owned homes and apartments. For example, Cork Road and King George Road, are the commercial hearts of the suburb, home to numerous businesses and medical facilities and well as many flats and apartments. These residences not only provided attractive low-rise multi-housing mixed income communities but also contribute much to the vibrancy of the area.

Belgravia area is historically an anglophone area, but today is home to a black, middle to upper middle class majority, and a smaller white Zimbabwean and expat population. The area is very close to downtown, especially to Avondale Shopping Centre, a popular shopping mall. The area is well served by roads to both downtown and the northern suburbs.

Belgravia is often divided into four areas. Northern Belgravia is a quieter, leafier, and predominately residential area that consists of the area north of Lanark Road. This part of the neighbourhood is much mostly detached homes and a few embassies. The area is also subject to the influences of more recent developments on the thoroughfare of King George Road. East of King George is an area largely built after the Second World War, and home to a number of embassies and high commissions. The far south of neighbourhood, below Cork Road is heavily influenced by Parirenyatwa Hospital and UZ, College of Health Sciences. This area is much smaller geographically than the other two but much more densely populated. It consists almost entirely of low-rise apartment buildings and residential buildings converted to commercial use, interspersed by medical and healthcare institutions. This area was completely redeveloped in the early 1990s. The area to the west is a mostly commercial area that overlaps with Kensington and Avondale, along Connaught Road. It contains low-rise houses and a number of small businesses.

=== Embassies and high commissions ===
As one of the city's main embassy rows, Belgravia hosts several embassies and high commissions, including those of Austria, Australia, Algeria, Bangladesh, Botswana, Egypt, Ethiopia, Greece, Ghana, Indonesia, Jordan, Kuwait, Iran, Nigeria, Norway, Palestine, South Africa, Spain, Switzerland, Sudan, and the United Arab Emirates.

In addition a number of medical institutions are present in the neighbourhood due to the presence of Parirenyatwa Hospital in nearby Milton Park and the College of Health Sciences.

== Demography ==
Belgravia is a traditionally an affluent, commercial district. Though historically white and anglophone it is today a cosmopolitan district, albeit with a majority of black Zimbabweans. Despite the country's economic crisis, the area remains an affluent bastion along with its neighbours to the northeast.

Additionally, the prominence of international organizations and embassies has made the area well sought after by expats and young professionals as a more upscale respite from the workaday city centre.
