= St. John's Preparatory School (Harare) =

- The Emblem of St. John's Preparatory School

Location
- 21 Fisher Avenue, Rolf Valley, Borrowdale; Harare; Zimbabwe
- 17.7641784°S 31.1104429°E

Information
- Type: Independent, preparatory school
- Motto: Dominus Pastor (Latin: The Lord is my Shepherd)
- Founded: 1956
- Founders: Peter Hickman; Barbara Hickman
- Oversight: St. John's Educational Trust
- Headmistress: Janine Harvey
- Gender: Boys
- Age: 5 to 12
- Enrollment: 552 (2015)
- Campus type: Suburban
- Colours: Grey, Green, Gold
- Tuition: US$3.500.00 (Note: Termly fees, the year has 3 terms.)
- Feeder to: St. John's College
- Affiliations: ATS
- Website: www.stjohns.co.zw

St. John's Preparatory School is an independent, preparatory day school for boys aged 5 to 12 in Borrowdale, Harare, Zimbabwe. The school is owned and governed by the St. John's Educational Trust, as is St. John's College.

St. John's Preparatory School is a member of the Association of Trust Schools (ATS).

== History ==
St John’s Preparatory School was founded in 1956 by Peter and Barbara Hickman at their Borrowdale property. It began as a small family school with 13 pupils. It was their desire to establish a school for boys which offered "a sound system of education in an atmosphere conducive to the growth and development of each personality". The school grew to 120 boys with a class in each grade from 1 to 7. Pressure on places was such, that in the early eighties the school doubled in numbers, and then trebled with three classes in each year group and a total of 525 boys.

== Activities ==
Each pupil is expected to participate in at least one sport and one cultural activity.

=== Sports ===
The following sports are offered: athletics, cricket, cross country, football, golf, hockey, rugby, squash, swimming, tennis, triathlon, volleyball and water polo.

=== Clubs ===
Each pupil is expected to participate in one cultural activity. The following clubs are available: Art, Chess, Computers, Choir, Debating, Drama, Environmental Club, Golf, Marimbas, Recorders, Firs Aid, WildLife, Masterchef, Bible Blast, Squash and Triathlon.

== List of School Heads ==
- Peter Hickman (1956-1977)
- David Bawden (1978-1984)
- Angus Milne (1985-1988)
- Mike McKenzie (1989-2019)
- Ryan Barbour (2019-2025)
- Janine Harvey (2026-present)

== Notable alumni ==
- Eli Snyman - South Africa, Italy and England rugby union player
- TJ Maguranyanga - Zimbabwe rugby union player

== See also ==
- St. John's College (Harare)
- List of schools in Zimbabwe
