= Oriel Boys' High School =

School in Harare, Zimbabwe

Coordinates: 17.78454°S 31.12197°E

Oriel Boys' High School is a government school located Chisipite, a suburb of Harare, Zimbabwe. It was established in 1961 based on the British model of education, offering GCE Ordinary and Advanced Level certification in preparation for University education. It's a boys school, with a neighboring sister school, Oriel Girls High School.

== Trivia ==
It has been used as a polling station for both local elections in 2010 and national elections five years later. The school is perhaps best known for having played and lost a football match in which the school-boy team was defeating by an opposing team which consisted of much older players; in one case an opposing team's player was thirty-four years old.

== Notable alumni ==
- Andy Flower, cricketer
- Albert Alan Owen, composer

== Website ==
http://www.orielboyshigh.ac.zw/
