= Greece–Zimbabwe relations =

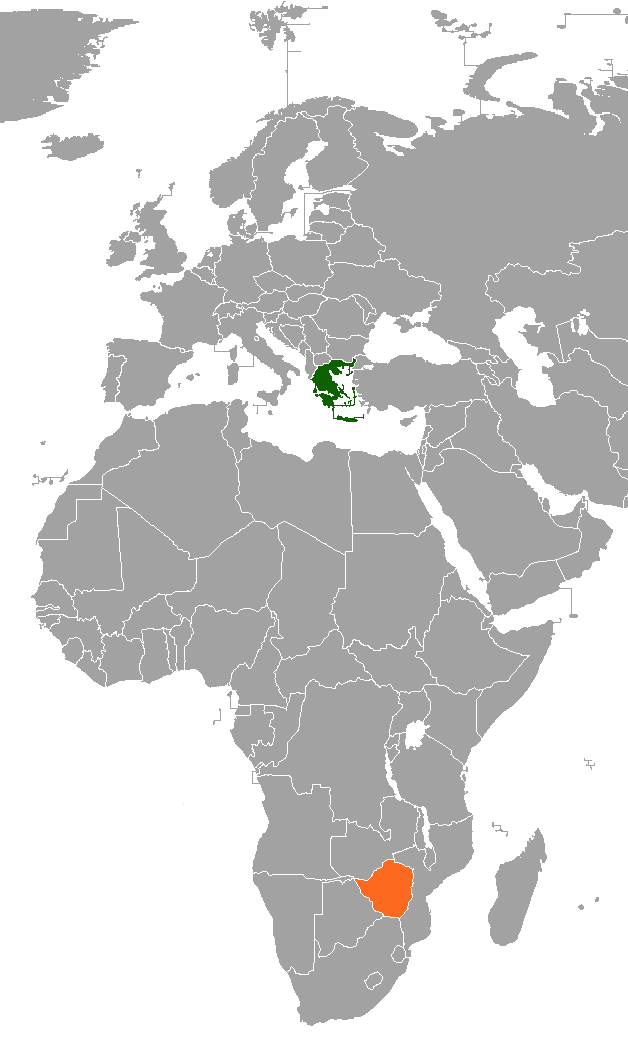

- Greece: Zimbabwe

Greece–Zimbabwe relations are the bilateral relations between Greece and Zimbabwe. Greece has an embassy in Harare. Due to the economic situation, Zimbabwe has neither an embassy nor an honorary consulate in Greece.

== History ==
The Greek community in Zimbabwe reached a peak of about 13,000-15,000 in 1972. It has since been reduced to about 1,100 Greeks or people of Greek origin from the instability in Zimbabwe.

There are three Greek language schools owned by the Greek community in Harare, the first has been in operation since 1954. There is a Greek high school, a Greek elementary school, and a Greek kindergarten.

In 1982, Greece agreed to provide Zimbabwe with economic, tourist, and trade assistance.

Starting in 2002 relations between Greece and Zimbabwe have been influenced by European Union imposed sanctions. The sanctions include a ban on "visas to government officials, freezing their assets in the EU and a ban on selling arms". The last ministerial official visits took place in 1998.

The Holy Archbishopric of Zimbabwe and Southern Africa is under the jurisdiction of the Patriarchate of Alexandria. Patriarch Theodore II of Alexandria, was put in place in December 2004 to serve the Holy Archbishopric in Zimbabwe. In 2007 Robert Mugabe met with Theodore.

In 2008, the Greek Ambassador to Zimbabwe, Mihail Koukakis talked about two new aid projects for the people of Zimbabwe, a food programme worth $70,000; and $75,000 for Chivhu Hospital in Harare.

== Resident diplomatic missions ==
- Greece has an embassy in Harare.
- Zimbabwe is accredited to Greece from its embassy in Rome, Italy.

== See also ==
- Foreign relations of Greece
- Foreign relations of Zimbabwe
- Greeks in Zimbabwe
