= St. John's College (Harare) =

- The Emblem of St. John's College

Location
- 179 Fisher Avenue, Rolf Valley, Borrowdale; Harare; Zimbabwe
- Coordinates: 17.7645°S 31.1130°E

Information
- Type: Independent, day high school
- Motto: Dominus Pastor (Latin: The Lord Is Our Shepherd)
- Established: 22 January 1986
- Oversight: St John's Educational Trust
- Headmaster: Cavaliere Corrado Trinci
- Forms: 1–6
- Gender: Boys, Girls (6th Form Only)
- Age: 12 to 18
- Enrollment: 564 (2015)
- Colours: Green and White
- Nickname: Rams
- Rivals: St. George's College
- Publication: The Rams
- Tuition: US$4,200.00 (Forms 1–4); US$4,400.00 (Sixth Form); (Note: Termly fees, the year has 3 terms.)
- Feeder schools: St. John's Preparatory School
- Affiliations: ATS; CHISZ
- Alumni: Old Johannians
- Website: stjohnszim.com/about-the-college/

St. John's College is an independent, day high school for boys aged 12–18 in Borrowdale, a suburb in Harare, Zimbabwe. The school, established in 1986, is owned and governed by the St John's Educational Trust, as is St. John's Preparatory School.

St John's College was ranked as one of the Top 10 High Schools in Zimbabwe in 2014.

St John's College is a member of the Association of Trust Schools (ATS) and the International Boys' Schools Coalition (IBSC). The Headmaster is a member of the Conference of Heads of Independent Schools in Zimbabwe (CHISZ).

== History ==
Brian Igoe, a parent and Governor of St. John's Preparatory School, first raised the idea of another private secondary school in the mid-1970s. It could not be pursued due to constraints arising from the prevailing struggle for independence. In 1981, Scot Honey and David Ellman-Brown revived the proposal. There was an overwhelming positive response and by February 1982 the first informal discussions took place with the Ministry of Education. Scot Honey was appointed Chairman of a sub committee charged with overseeing the development of the proposed college. Colin Broadbent, Anthony de la Rue, Stuart Perry and David Zamchiya came on board and set about finding a suitable site. A location informally referred to as the 'maize patch' was preferable but it had been zoned out as a government primary school. The permission for the re-zoning of the land was granted and a donation of land was made by a local firm. By January 1983, a formal application to establish the college was made to the Ministry of Education. David Zamchiya played a crucial role in sensitive discussions, affirming Government's policy on racial equality and social justice.

On 1 February 1985 David Vincent, chairman of the Board of Governors received the go-ahead to establish the college from the Ministry of Education. The architects, Adams, Jackson and Moore produced plans for municipal approval; Ted Sharples was recruited as headmaster and fund raising was initiated in April 1985. Tony Knight was appointed chair of the fund raising committee, which also consisted of Barney Barnard, Brian Grubb, Scot Honey, Les Johns, Douglas Kadenhe, Gibb Lanpher, Ted Sharples, Tom Taylor, David Vincent and David Zamchiya. The architect's sketch of the school depicted a trim double storey building with facilities for classes up to Form IV level with intake being limited to 11 students in Form I. New forms would be added each year up to Advanced Level classes in 1990.

The opening of St. John's was publicised in the press together with the date of entrance examinations. Primary schools were approached, seeking the recommendation of prospective pupils. In August 1985, Construction Associates won the tender and construction of the school was completed in 22 weeks. A borehole and irrigation system was set up by Prep School parents Roger Searle and Roger Thompson. These systems enabled landscaper Toni Honey to "transform an erstwhile maize patch into a tropical garden". Toni Knight and his fund raising committee raised Z$750000 in a year from contributions by local firms.

In July 1985, prospective pupils for the school sat for the entrance examinations at St. John's Preparatory School. By October, teaching staff had been recruited.

On 22 January 1986, St. John's College opened with 180 boys. The school grew steadily and in 1990, the first Sixth Form pupils completed their A Level.

In 2002, St. John's College became the first International Baccalaureate Centre and the sixth form became co-educational, allowing girls the option to enroll into the IB Diploma program.

In 2012, The IB Diploma program which had been running successfully for ten years, was ended together with the coeducation of the sixth form, making the school an all-boys institution again.

In 2018, the school began intake of girls to its 6th Form Cambridge Advanced Level Program, thus making the College Sixth Form coeducational once more.

== Academics ==
St. John's College is a Cambridge school, meaning the school offer academic programs developed and assessed by Cambridge International Examinations (such as Cambridge IGCSE, Cambridge International AS and A Level).

== Sports ==
The school offers the following sports: athletics, basketball, cricket, cross-country, football, hockey, rugby, squash, golf, swimming, tennis, volleyball and water polo.

The official mascot for the school is the ram, with all first teams using the name "Rams".

== Clubs and societies ==
The school has the following clubs and societies available: Art Club, Bridge Club, Engineering Club, Chess Club, Debating Society, First Aid, Interact Club, Impact (Scripture Union), Model United Nations, Pipe Band, Pottery Club, Quiz Club, Public Speaking, Drama, Jazz Band, Electric Band, Orchestra, Choir, a Capella, Guitar Club, Marimba, French Club, Coding Club, Photography, Hospitality and the Toastmasters Society.

== List of College Heads ==
- Ted Sharples (1985–1989)
- Alec Dry (1989–1990)
- Peter Kolbe (1990–1997)
- Tony Eysele (1998–2004)
- Andrew Vincent (2004–2008)
- Ross Fuller (2008–2011)
- William J. Annandale (2012–2017)
- Cavaliere Corrado Trinci (2017–present)

== Old Johannians ==
The alumni of St John's College are referred to as Old Johannians. Former pupils can join the Old Johannians Association in Harare.

=== Notable Old Johannians ===
- Wayne Black – Zimbabwe Davis Cup & Grand Slam winning Tennis player
- Scott Brant – Zimbabwe Cricketer
- Eddie Byrom – Cricketer for Somerset CCC & Glamorgan CCC
- Brendon de Jonge – Zimbabwean golfer, played on the PGA Tour and in the Presidents Cup
- Christopher Felgate – Zimbabwe Olympic triathlete
- Mark Fynn – Zimbabwe tennis player
- Murray Goodwin – Zimbabwe & Sussex CCC Cricketer
- Kyle Jarvis – Zimbabwe & Lancashire CCC Cricketer
- Benjamin Lock – Zimbabwe tennis player
- Courtney Lock – Zimbabwe tennis player
- David Maidza – Zimbabwe rugby union player, coach of NMU Madibaz
- Zororo Makamba – Radio personality and journalist
- Ismail ibn Musa Menk – Grand Mufti of Zimbabwe
- Peter Moor – Zimbabwe Cricketer and former captain
- Waddington Mwayenga - Zimbabwe Cricketer
- Barney Rogers – Zimbabwe Cricketer
- Dane Schadendorf – Cricketer for Nottinghamshire CCC
- Shane Snater – Netherlands & Essex CCC cricketer
- Eli Snyman – Leicester Tigers & Springboks U20 rugby union player
- Brendan Taylor – Zimbabwe & Nottinghamshire CCC Cricketer and former captain
- Scott Vincent – Professional Golfer
- Nick Welch – Zimbabwe & Leicestershire CCC Cricketer

== See also ==
- St. John's Preparatory School (Harare)
- List of schools in Zimbabwe
- Education in Zimbabwe
