= Cochin Herald =

- Chief Editor: Ansif Ashraf
- Categories: Business magazine
- Frequency: Bi-monthly
- Founded: 1992
- Company: Cochin Herald Media Network LLP.
- Country: India
- Based in: Kochi, Kerala
- Language: English
- Website: www.cochinherald.com (expired)

Cochin Herald is an Indian business magazine. Published bi-monthly, it features original reporting, commentary and analysis. Its headquarters are located in Kochi City, Kerala. The motto of Cochin Herald magazine is "Business Story Telling". It was established as a Sunday newspaper in 1992.

== History ==
Dr S.A. Mohamed Asharaf., founded the Cochin Herald on 1 November 1992 as a weekly newspaper in Malayalam. Ashraf was the paper's chairman, a post he held until his death in 2016. He earned a doctorate for his research on Islamic history at the age of 55 from Kerala University.

Asharaf was assisted in his later years by his eldest son, Ansif Ashraf, who started Cochin Herald business magazine in 2012. On Ashraf's death, Ansif became Chairman of the Cochin Herald and Chief Editor of Cochin Herald magazine.

== Ownership ==
The Kochi-based English magazine Cochin Herald is part of the Cochin Herald Media Network LLP and is managed by Ansif Ashraf. The family of Dr. S.A. Mohammad Ashraf owns a 90 percent stake in Cochin Herald Media Network LLP. Ansif Ashraf joined Cochin Herald in 2012 and became the chairman in 2016.

== Cochinherald.com ==
Cochinherald.com is part of Cochin Herald Media Network LLP. Cochinherald.com employs the slogan "A Business Story Teller". Articles are digitally published on the website.
