= Highlands, Harare =

Highlands
- Suburb
- Location within Zimbabwe
- Coordinates: 17°49′15″S 31°02′57″E
- Country: Zimbabwe
- Province: Harare
- District: Harare
- Founded: 1927

Government

Area
  - Urban: 88.44 km^{2} (34.15 sq mi)
- Elevation: 1,624 m (5,328 ft)

Population (2022)
  - Suburb: 49,505
  - Density: 559.8/km^{2} (1,450/sq mi)
- estimated
- Time zone: UTC+2 (CAT)
  - Summer (DST): UTC+2 (not observed)

Highlands is an upper-middle income, residential suburb nestled between Borrowdale and Newlands in the east of Harare, best known as the home of the Zimbabwe Broadcasting Corporation, and for its ethnic diversity, history, natural environment and splendid panoramic views of downtown Harare. Located in the 'Golden Triangle' of Harare, it is sometimes grouped in the inner east suburbs of Harare along with other suburbs such as Eastlea, Mandara or Greendale.

== History ==
When farmer, Gerhardt Van der Byl retired back to the Cape Province in 1927, he sold his then farm, Welmoed to the Salisbury Real Estate Co, a property development company with Scottish founders, who settled on the name Highlands, partly because it lies on one of the highest pieces of ground in Harare, but also because of their Scottish heritage. The first road to be paved and developed was called Argyle Drive. This was later redesignated as part of the Newlands suburb. Over time, Highlands was subdivided and became a desirable place to live close to the city centre.

The most expensive residential street in Highlands is Orange Grove Drive, located between Kew Drive and Ridgeway North.

Due in part to its elevation, Highlands has long been one of the more desirable and quieter areas in Harare to live. This suburb of Harare is generally well-kept and retains an abundance of trees. It is situated between similar northeastern areas like Borrowdale, Chisipite and Glen Lorne. It is within good commuting distance of the city centre. Despite this proximity to the CBD, Highlands has seen less of the development and gentrification experienced in nearby, Eastlea, Newlands and Greendale. Suburban houses in these areas are being bought and demolished in favor of commercial buildings and apartments due to lack of space in the city. As a result, Highlands has become a popular for boutique hotels and lodges that offer a refuge from the city centre, while maintaining a disproportionate number of long term residents by city standards.

Within the Ballantyne and Mukuvisi Woodlands boundaries lies one the highest natural point in the Harare, some 1600 metres above sea level. Ballantyne Park also hosts community gardens, playgrounds, tennis courts, playing fields, and dog-walkers year round, while Mukuvisi is a popular nature and wildlife reserve.

Highlands was transformed when television was introduced on 15 November 1960 after ZBC TV, then RTV, opened its television studios on Northend Road in Pockets Hill, Highlands, making it the second country after Nigeria to launch a television service in Africa and the first in Southern Africa.

== Geographic impact ==
The neighborhood is near one the highest points in Harare, Ballantyne Park, which houses a nature reserve, recreation areas and a mixed use cricket and soccer field. Due to the high altitude, Highlands is best known as the Zimbabwe Broadcasting Corporation, Multichoice Zimbabwe and nearly all of the city's radio masts and towers including the studios and/or towers for ZBC television and radio stations. A government monopoly on local broadcasting has prevented the area from becoming a true media hub in the vein of London's, White City, though there has been talk of allowing more private broadcasters by the Mnangagwa government.

== Architecture ==
Highlands is one of the most architecturally rich areas of Harare, thanks to its founders the, Salisbury Real Estate Company, and most prominently, William D'Arcy Cathcart, a graduate of the Architectural Association of London, before he migrated to Salisbury (Harare) in 1910. Initially working for the Public Works Department, he left the following year to set up his own practice. His first project was a Tobacco Warehouse for the BSAC.

In association with a few friends, he formed the Salisbury Real Estate Company that bought the Welmoed East Farm and developed in the early 1930s into the suburb of Highlands. D'Arcy Cathcart made such a mark architecturally, that he is regarded as one of the leading architects of 20th century Harare. He eschewed the then popular Cape Dutch architecture and designed many buildings and residences that followed the English neoclassical, Georgian and the Arts and Crafts movement styles. His own residence Chaninga House, nestled on a prominent hill in the suburb, and Limbe Lodge best known as Governor's Lodge (now the public Services Training Center) – once home to the Governor-General of Rhodesia and Nyasaland are listed as heritage buildings.

While most buildings and residences from post-World War I Rhodesia were simple pioneer types or Cape Dutch designs, Cathcart's designs of the National Employers Mutual General Assurance Building, and Town house made his firm extremely influential throughout the 1930s–1940s for municipal and government buildings. His practice later opened offices in Mutare, Bulawayo, Ndola and Lusaka. A founder member of the Institute of Southern Rhodesian Architects (now Institute of Architects Zimbabwe) and the chief influence on Highlands' layout and architecture, his legacy continues in his firm, now known as Pearce, McComish & Tarabuku Architects.

Modern Highlands is largely a leafy, residential neighbourhood in the shadow of the ZBC's Pockets Hill studios, composed primarily of single-family detached houses and Edwardian row houses, although Enterprise Road and Kamfinsa Shopping Centre are lined with apartment buildings, townhouses and lodges.

== Education ==
Highlands is the location of several independent schools, including Highlands Junior School, and Abbeys Preparatory School. High school students tend to move on to Harare International School or Chisipite Senior School in Chisipite.

Other notable institutions in the area include the Zimbabwe Institute of Management and the Culinary Arts Academy.

The City of Harare Public Library system operates the Highlands Library on Kew Drive, which serves the neighbourhood. Other notable libraries in proximity to Highlands are Harare City Library and the Greendale Public Library in Greendale.

== Historic landmarks ==
There are several historic landmarks in Highlands. Religious listings include Highlands Presbyterian Church, which reflects the areas Scottish links, Highlands Seventh-day Adventist Church.

Highlands Junior School is noted for its historical architecture.
