= Greeks in Zimbabwe =

Greeks in Zimbabwe Έλληνες της Ζιμπάμπουε
Total population
- Greeks; 3,000

Regions with significant populations
- Harare, Bulawayo

Languages
- Zimbabwean English; Greek

Religion
- Predominantly Greek Orthodox

Zimbabwe

The Greeks in Zimbabwe comprise about 3,000 people of Greek origin, with over half of them from the island of Cyprus. The Holy Archdiocese of Zimbabwe and Southern Africa is under the jurisdiction of the Patriarchate of Alexandria. Hellenic Academy, an independent Greek high school was established in Harare in 2008 and continues to operate. Zimbabwe also hosts several Greek Orthodox churches as well as Greek associations and humanitarian organizations.

Most of the Greek community are to be found in Harare, and to a lesser extent Bulawayo, Gweru, and Kwekwe. Many Greek Zimbabweans maintain their identity through the observation of Greek customs and traditions, and their adherence to their Greek Orthodox Christian faith, whilst also participating in Zimbabwean society. The number of people reporting their ethnicity as Greek in Zimbabwe was over 3,000 in the 2012 census. An estimated 30,000 to 45,000 people have Greek ancestry, a majority of whom now reside abroad.

In the modern era, many Greeks came by way of Cyprus, Greece and to a lesser extent South Africa, the Congo and Egypt to Zimbabwe, coming in waves from the 1950s to the early 1970s. The vast majority of these migrants came to Harare, which still feature noticeable Hellenic heritage with churches, restaurants, small businesses, and social clubs. Suburbs that became Greek hubs during this era include Milton Park, Greendale, Newlands, Highlands, and Eastlea, the latter where the Hellenic Club of Harare is based.

== History ==
=== Background ===
Few Greek people resided in early Rhodesia, due to an immigration policy that favoured British settlers, while discriminating against Europeans particularly those from non-Protestant backgrounds. Rhodesian whites created an image of a thriving settler community presiding over the African majority. One of the reasons for screening immigrants was to avoid “poor white aliens” entering the colony. Rhodesian settlers considered whites who lived below their expected standards as undesirables, or they were simply known as the “other”. As they began to enter the country, Greeks were negatively stereotyped as undesirables and often faced hurdles settling in the country.

The line of thinking behind this policy was clearly articulated by Ethel Tawse Jollie who noted in the Zimbabwe Herald in the 1920s that:

The average British-born Rhodesian feels that this is essentially a British

country, pioneered, bought and developed by British people, and he

wants to keep it so

=== Displaced persons and refugees ===
Many Greeks immigrated to Zimbabwe for a better life, in the wake of World War II and the Greek Civil War, fought from 1946 to 1949. Rhodesian authorities who had long discriminated and limited the entry of non-Protestant and British migrants as 'undesirable whites', were pressured by the British government to accept more refugees. As a member of the International Refugee Organization, the country allowed a few Greeks and Poles to settle in the early 1950s. Although most arrivals found work in retail and manufacturing jobs in Harare, some found work in hydroelectric construction and heavy industry where there was a severe shortage of labour in the early post-war period.

=== The "Golden Age" ===
A greater influx of Greek immigration took place in the 1950s and 1960s due to economic and political problems in Greece and as the country's economy expanded during the Federal years. Many Greeks emigrated from Greece during this period, a small minority of whom came to Zimbabwe. Many Greeks settled in the central districts of Salisbury, finding work in retail, manufacturing, construction and hospitality. The Greek community's population peaked in the mid-1970s, with over 15,000 Greeks and their Zimbabwean descendants.

=== Greek Cypriots ===
A disproportionate number of Greeks came to the country directly from Cyprus. Cyprus was also a British territory and most were able to immigrate to the country as British subjects. Most Greek Cypriots arrived in the period after World War Two between 1948 and 1960. Some Cypriots arrived from Greek Cyprus following the Turkish invasion of Cyprus in 1974, as the then-Smith government removed restrictions on Europeans to boost the white population. Greek Cypriots have built their own community hall and community associations often paving the way for the broader Greek community.

The Greek community in Zimbabwe numbered between 13,000 and 15,000 people in 1972 but following the deterioration of Zimbabwe's domestic and financial situation has been reduced to a fraction of its former size. The country's highest-scoring flying ace of World War II, John Plagis, was the son of Greek immigrants from the island of Lemnos.

=== Present situation ===
Since 2000, a growing number of Greek Zimbabweans sought Greek passports, in the wake of the country's economic crisis. Most have done so in order to gain easy access to the EU and many have joined the Zimbabwean diaspora in the United Kingdom. As such, the community has begun to stagnate with many young people choosing to migrate. Greek citizenship is acquired by birth by all persons born in Greece, and all persons born with at least one parent who is a registered Greek citizen. Any person who is ethnically Greek born outside Greece may become a Greek citizen through naturalization, providing they can prove a parent or grandparent was born as a national of Greece.

The local Greek community and Greece itself are active in the field of humanitarian assistance to Zimbabwe. Apart from a few landowners and businesspeople the majority of Greeks in the country are occupied in trade and other activities that contribute to the country's economy. There are Greek communities in various cities in the country, including Bulawayo, Mutare, Gweru and Harare where the local community has been operating a Greek school since 1954.

== Notable people ==
- Ioannes Antoniades, Former mayor of Gweru (born in Othos of Karpathos island, 1864)
- Alexander Theodore Callinicos, Zimbabwean-British political theorist and activist
- Kiki Divaris, former model, designer, and national hero.
- Mario Frangoulis, Greek singer (born 1967, from Kasos island)
- Vangelis Haritatos, Deputy Minister for Lands, Agriculture, Water, Climate and Rural Resettlement
- Helen Lieros, visual artist, gallerist, art collector and owner of Delta Gallery
- John Plagis, Flying ace in the Royal Air Force (1919–1974, from Lemnos island)
- Sabrina, Greek singer (born 1969)
- Aravella Simotas, American politician (born 1978)
- Brian Raftopoulos, author, academic, and historian
- John Traicos, Zimbabwe & South African test cricketer (born 1947, from Lemnos & Kalymnos islands)
- George Zambellas, Chief of the Naval Staff of the Royal Navy (born 1958, from Castellorizo island)

== See also ==
- Greece–Zimbabwe relations
