= Gadzema =

Coordinates: 18°02′S 30°09′E

Gadzema is a village in the province of Mashonaland West, Zimbabwe. It is located about 110 km south-west of Harare on the main Harare-Bulawayo railway line. The village grew up around the railway station that was built on the line. It was named after a nearby hill, Ganidzima Hill, which means "a shining place". Gold was discovered in the area and in 1905 the Giant Mine was opened but is now closed. In 1920 the station was closed and is now just operated as a siding.
