= Mnangagwa =

Mnangagwa is a surname popular in Zimbabwe. Notable people with the surname include:

- Auxillia Mnangagwa (born 1963), Zimbabwean politician, wife of Emmerson
- David Kudakwashe Mnangagwa (born 1989), deputy finance minister of Zimbabwe, son of Emmerson
- Emmerson Mnangagwa (born 1942), president of Zimbabwe
- Tongai Mnangagwa (born 1978), Zimbabwean politician and MP
