= Greendale, Harare =

Coordinates: 17°49′01″S 31°07′00″E

Greendale is an affluent suburb in eastern Harare, Zimbabwe, noted for its residents of Shona and Indian descent.

== History ==
A Certificate of Occupation and residence was granted to a German immigrant named, George Haupt, and Greendale Farm was transferred to Haupt and Henry Spreaker trading as Haupt and Co. on 17 December 1892. Haupt, an engineer from the Rhine Valley, was one of the first people to follow the occupation forces into the country. It is not known how the name, Greendale came about, but 1890 saw considerable rainfall (Father Hartmann measured it at 63 inches, or about twice our normal mean average of 850mm a year) – a record that stood until the 2008-2009 rain season. By the early 1900s the area was annexed to the city of Harare and earmarked for residential settlement.

== See also ==
- Highlands
