= Young professional =

Young person employed in a white-collar occupation

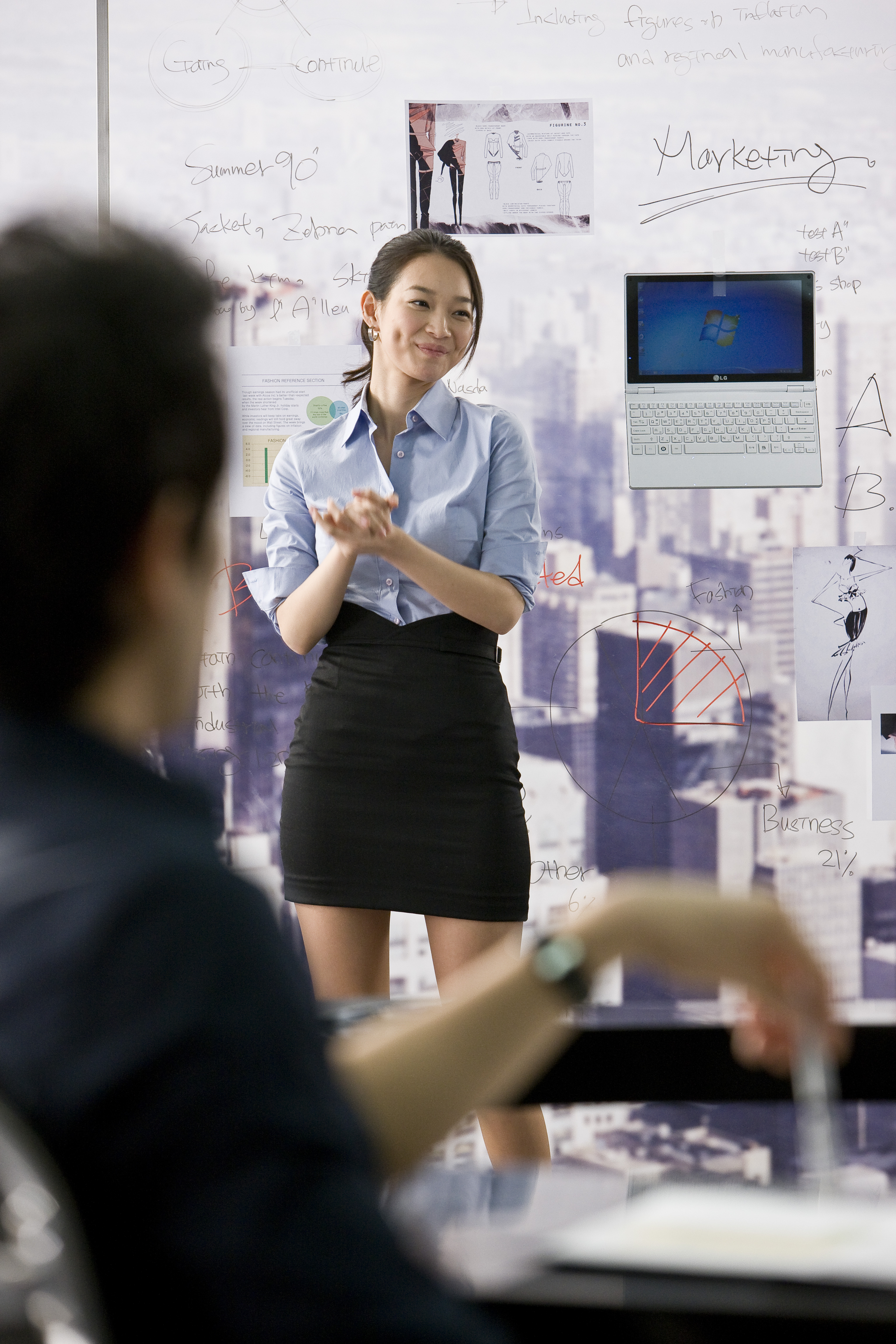
A young businesswoman giving a presentation.

The term young professional generally refers to young people between 20 and 40 who are employed in a profession or white-collar occupation. The meaning may be ambiguous and has evolved from its original narrow meaning of a young person in a professional field. Although derivative of the term 'yuppie', it has grown into its own set of meanings.

== Traits ==
The term was originally, and is still used to some degree, to narrowly refer to recent graduates of professional schools serving in professional careers. The term typically refers to people between the ages of 20 and 40, but there are those who state 35 is the upper age range.

Stereotypically, they can also be viewed as having an "obsession with success" and "plagued with loneliness". Alternatively, young professionals can be seen as highly spiritual and "seeking a spiritual outlet to balance their hectic working lives".

== Impact and connections with larger entities ==
Young professionals can provide a welcome increase in a local area's tax base and can also create a snowball effect of attracting and infusing young energy and talent into an area. Young professionals can also organize themselves and bring energy to shape communities and alter local or ethnic politics.

Young professionals are courted by larger social and occupational organizations or employers in some contexts, but not in other.

Young professionals are also heavily targeted by purveyors of career and financial advice.

In the workplace, young professionals can be viewed as talented and energetic individuals who present special management challenges or as "cannon fodder" to be cast aside once they are no longer profitable to a business.

== As euphemism for "single" ==
The stigma that developed in the 1970s around singles functions and singles groups led some organizations to switch the name of their singles events to "young professionals events". However, other organizations specifically for young professionals insist that they are not "singles groups".

== See also ==
- Singleton (lifestyle)
- Young downwardly-mobile professional
