= Chisipite Junior School =

Independent school in Harare, Zimbabwe

Address
- 20 St. Aubin's Walk, Chisipite; Harare; Zimbabwe

Information
- Type: Independent, preparatory school
- Motto: Fons Vitae Caritas (Latin: Love is the fountain of life)
- Denomination: Interdenominational
- Founded: 1929
- Founder: Maisie Jenkinson
- Headmaster: Allan Mayger
- Gender: Girls
- Campus type: Suburban
- Houses: Anderson; Jenkinson; Purvis
- Song: Gracious Spirit Holy Ghost by Christopher Wordsworth
- Tuition: US$1,750.00 (Note: Termly fees, the year has 3 terms.)
- Feeder to: Chisipite Senior School
- Affiliations: ATS; CHISZ
- Website: www.chisijun.co.zw

Chisipite Junior School is an independent, preparatory, day school for girls in Harare, Zimbabwe. The school was founded in 1929 by Maisie Jenkinson as a small farm school.

Chisipite Junior School is a member of the Association of Trust Schools (ATS) and the Head is a member of the Conference of Heads of Independent Schools in Zimbabwe (CHISZ).

== History ==
In Salisbury, Southern Rhodesia (now Harare, Zimbabwe) a land surveyor named Mr. Jenkinson bought a 440 acres (180 ha) farm for his retirement and named it "Chisipite", a Shona word meaning "water from below" or "spring". He and his family moved into the house in 1922. When he died, his wife Mrs. Gertrude May (Maisie) Jenkinson (a teacher by profession) decided to educate Betty, her only daughter, at home, as she felt she was too young to go to boarding school. Thus, Chisipite was opened as a farm school with Betty Thomas, Molly MacIlwaine and Sue Ludgater as the first pupils in 1929. By the end of the year there were twenty pupils. The school was government aided and still had to conform to government regulations.

Maisie Jenkinson retired in 1943, and the school bought by Tom and Beryl Anderson. Mrs Anderson, an alumnus of Oxford and a teacher at Prince Edward School prior, became headmistress and her husband took care of the school’s maintenance and the building of additions. The school at that time had 23 pupils, boys and girls, and the term’s fee for boarders was £22. By 1950, the enrollment rose to 100 and many additions made: a new dining room, more classrooms and dormitories. Mrs Anderson became aware of the need for a senior school and in 1951 a number of girls stayed on for the Form One year. Mrs Anderson formed a private company to take transfer of additional land and started the building of the senior school. By means of a loan and funds raised by parents and friends, the buildings were started, and in 1954 the first section of Chisipite Senior School opened.

Mrs Anderson retired after 21 years as headmistress and was succeeded by Mrs Kay Purvis in 1965, during economically challenging times in Rhodesia. The school houses – Bluebird, Blackbird, Robin and Sunbird were born.

Mrs Purvis retired in 1973, being succeeded by Joan Howard. In the early 70’s the viability of the school was threatened due to the dwindling number of pupils from Zambia. Because of the political isolation of Rhodesia then, the Zambian border was closed. The school at this time had 120 pupils of whom only 20 came from this country. Major changes took place in the school. A bank of cypress trees was cut down, the skating rink was demolished thus expanding the Jubilee Field. In 1982, construction of the school hall commenced.

In May 1993, Allan Mayger became the first male headmaster of Chisipite Junior School after the Mrs Howard's retirement. Mr Mayger’s own aim has been to develop the facilities, without threatening the character of the school. In spite of a harsh economic environment much refurbishment and construction has been achieved, with the help and support of the stakeholders involved with the school.

== Academics ==
Class sizes are limited, and apart from the classroom teachers, the school is staffed with specialists in art, computers, Shona, sport, music and remediation. The overall pupil: staff ratio is 20:1, and this allows a variety of activities and interest to be actively pursued.

== List of Chisipite Junior Heads ==
- Gertrude May Jenkinson (1929-1943)
- Beryl Anderson (1943-1964)
- Kay Purvis (1965-1973)
- Joan Howard (1973-1993)
- Allan Mayger (1993-present)

- 2014- Head girl: Anesu Nyachiya
- 2014- Deputy Head Girl: Kate Mason
- 2015-Head Girl:Hannah Mae Mitchell
- 2015-Deputy Head Girl: Hannah Van Rooyen
- 2016-Head Girl: Sinead Higgins
- 2016-Deputy Head Girl: Matipa Nkomo
- 2017-Head Girl: Molly Honey
- 2017-Deputy Head Girl: Anesu Mhembere

== Notable alumnae ==
- Janine Murray - Australian gymnast

== See also ==
- Chisipite Senior School
- List of schools in Zimbabwe
