= Borrowdale, Harare =

Borrowdale
- Neighborhood
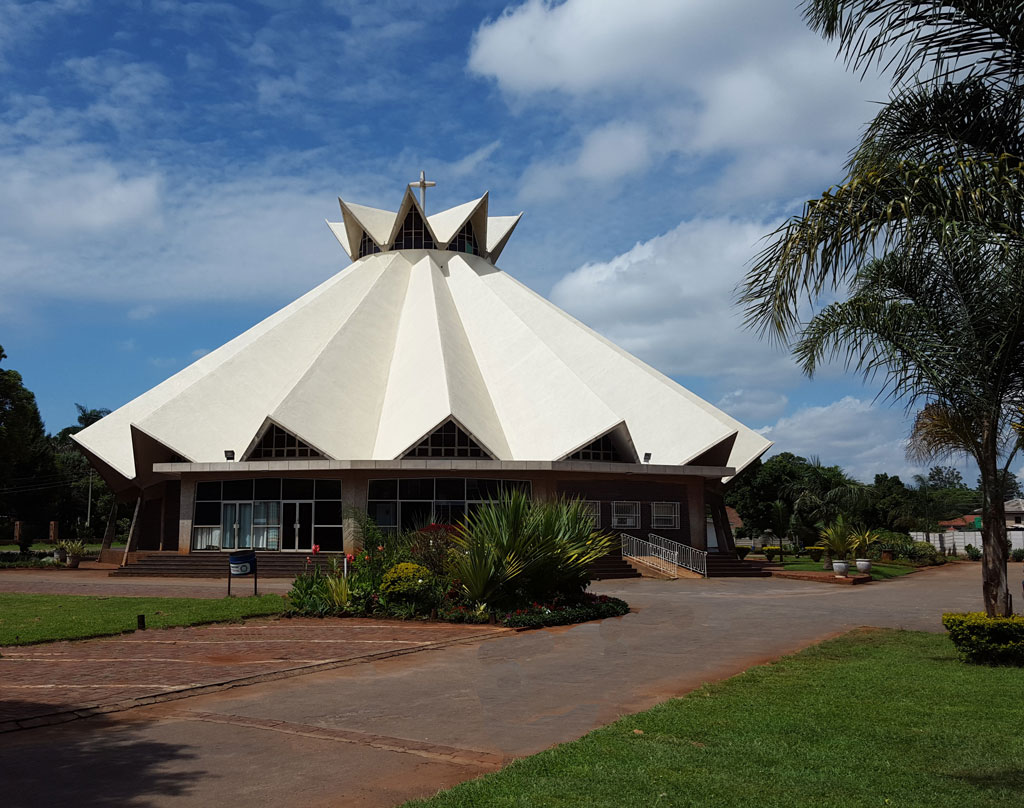
- St Gerards Borrowdale Parish

- Location within Zimbabwe
- Coordinates: 17°49′15″S 31°02′57″E
- Country: Zimbabwe
- Province: Harare
- District: Harare
- Founded: 1892

Area
  - Urban: 78.08 km^{2} (30.15 sq mi)
- Elevation: 1,590 m (5,220 ft)

Population (2022)
  - Neighborhood: 28,929
  - Density: 370.5/km^{2} (960/sq mi)
- estimated
- Time zone: UTC+2 (CAT)
  - Summer (DST): UTC+2 (not observed)

Borrowdale is a residential suburb in the north of Harare, Zimbabwe. It forms part of the Northeast suburbs of the city of Harare, with a population of 28,929 as of the Zimbabwe 2022 Census.

Borrowdale is home to the Borrowdale Race Course. Traditionally, the community of Borrowdale has been a wealthy one associated with the local elite, having been at one point the richest community in Zimbabwe.

The area is made up of the sub-neighbourhoods of Helensvale, Borrowdale Brooke, Philadelphia, Balentien Park, Crowhill Views, Brookeview and Pomona. The suburb has numerous high-end shopping areas such Sam Levy's Village and Borrowdale Brooke Centre. There are private schools within the area which include St. John's College, St. John's Preparatory School and The Heritage School.

== History ==
The name "Borrowdale" comes from the Old Scandinavian term borgardalr, which means "the valley of the fort". Captain John Henry Borrow commanded B Troop of the Salisbury Horse Volunteers. Born on 17 March 1865 (baptised 29 June 1865, Lanivet, Cornwall), the eldest son of the Rev. Henry John Borrow of Cornwall and later Canterbury and his wife Anne Kendall Borrow (nee Ward) who had married at Bodmin on 9 July 1863. He arrived in the Cape in 1882. In March 1887 with his friends Frank Johnson and Maurice Heany they went on a prospecting expedition to Mashonaland and ended up setting up the area as an estate (Borrowdale) that combined residential and farming areas. The estate consisted of 22,275 hectares of land spreading out northwards. The estate was purchased at the price of 17.5 cents per hectare. Borrow worked with his colleagues Heany and Johnson to produce vegetables and other products on the farm.

Borrow built a dam on the Borrowdale Brooke river in 1892 – the first in Rhodesia – and started to grow a variety of crops for the nascent town. The dam was used for many years for irrigation but was destroyed in 1939 after serious flooding.

In 1897, the area was acquired by United Goldfields Company which briefly ventured into livestock production, but the enterprise was a failure. The area was then developed into residential plots and this resulted in the emergence of residential estates such as Helensvale, Hatcliffe, Greystone Park, Quinnington, and Glen Forest.

During the twentieth century, Borrowdale became a wealthy suburb. It holds the home of former president Robert Mugabe, the "Blue Roof", one of the largest properties in the area.

== Character ==
Borrowdale is situated at a higher altitude than areas to the south, and it includes the Borrowdale Brooke stream. Borrowdale's shops, schools and recreational facilities are located the southern part of the suburb. The majority of residents in this neighborhood own several properties either abroad or in rural parts of the country such as, the Mazowe Valley, Mashonaland East and the scenic Eastern Highlands region near Mutare.

Notable institutions located in or adjacent to Borrowdale are the Borrowdale Brooke Golf Club, and Borrowdale Country Club.

=== Homes ===
Borrowdale's houses include a variety of architectural styles including English Cottage, Tudor Revival, Cape Dutch, and modern postwar designs. Most of these homes were built between the late 1940s and 1980s. Since the late 2000s, the area has grown popular among non-resident Zimbabwean and foreign buyers, driving up prices far beyond average incomes. As a result of the new development, parts of Borrowdale have been redeveloped with larger houses which do not match the scale of the original housing in the neighbourhood.

In the first part of 2018, the average resale house price in the neighborhood was $530,036, higher than any Harare neighborhood other than Hogerty Hill and Borrowdale Brooke.

By the mid-2010s, the number of people squatting in informal settlements was growing.

== Cityscape ==
Most of the area is residential. Homes increase in size and value toward the north, with the largest and most expensive being on its northern fringes towards Hogerty Hill and Shawasha Hills.

There are several small commercial districts such as Sam Levy's Village from the areas's western boundary, Rowland Square in central Borrowdale and Borrowdale Brook Centre to the northeast of the suburbs.

Borrowdale Adjacent or Borrowdale West is a term applied by realtors to a districts of Pomona and Rolf and Colne Valleys in order to promote these areas as matching Borrowdale's affluence and desirability to outsiders.

=== Parks ===
There are several parks within Borrowdale, including Ballantyne and Greystone Park (not to be confused with the neighbourhood of the same name). A scenic woodland area is located at Sandringham Drive, within ZimParks and Shire Gardens.

== Education ==
Throughout the 20th century, the concentration of wealth in Borrowdale sparked the growth of many public and private schools in and around the neighborhood. One of the first schools was the St. John's College.

Borrowdale is also home to several private schools, including, Westminster International, Borrowdale Academy, St. John's College, St. John's Preparatory School, St. George's College, Harare, Hartmann House Preparatory School and The Heritage School, Zimbabwe.

== Sports ==
Borrowdale is home to Borrowdale Race Course, the third ground in Zimbabwe to be built specifically for horse racing. It hosts a number of international competitions such as the OK Grand Challenge run by OK Zimbabwe Limited. The Castle Tankard, which is the oldest horse race competition in Zimbabwe, is one of the major annual events that takes place in Borrowdale.

Borrowdale is also home to one of the oldest active rugby clubs in Southern Africa, Old Georgians Rugby Club.

Borrowdale is the birthplace of tennis star siblings, Wayne Black, Cara Black and Byron Black.
