= Chisipite Senior School =

Location
- Hindhead Avenue, Chisipite, Harare; Zimbabwe
- 17°47′17″S 31°07′18″E

Information
- Type: Independent single sex secondary day and boarding school
- Motto: Latin: Fons Vitae Caritas (Love is the Fountain of Life)
- Denomination: Interdenominational
- Opened: 1954
- Headmistress: Dr. Reilly
- Faculty: 75+
- Forms: 1–4, Sixth Form
- Gender: Girls
- Enrollment: 602 (2016)
- Campus size: 25 acres (10 ha)
- Campus type: Suburban
- Houses: 4
- Tuition: US$2,690.00 (day); US$4,560.00 (boarding); (Note: Termly fees, the year has 3 terms.)
- Feeder schools: Chisipite Junior School
- Affiliations: Association of Trust Schools; Conference of Heads of Independent Schools in Zimbabwe; Alliance of Girls Schools Australasia
- Alumni: Fontanians
- Website: chisipitesenior.com

Chisipite Senior School (or Chisipite) is an independent single-sex secondary day and boarding school for girls, located in Harare, Zimbabwe. The school is sited on 25 acres (10 ha) of land with 75+ academic staff and 750 girls (of whom 40 girls are boarders) enrolled.

Chisipite Senior School was ranked 67th out of the top 100 best high schools in Africa by Africa Almanac in 2003, based upon quality of education, student engagement, strength and activities of alumnae, school profile, internet and news visibility. Chisipite Senior was also ranked as one of the Top 10 High Schools in Zimbabwe in 2014.

Chisipite Senior School is a member of the Association of Trust Schools (ATS) and the Alliance of Girls' Schools Australasia; and the Head is a member of the Conference of Heads of Independent Schools in Zimbabwe (CHISZ).

== Overview ==
Chisipite Senior School was opened in 1954 to cater for students who had finished their primary education at Chisipite Junior School. Initially, the school had two members of staff and 48 girls. Chisipite Senior School is "the first inter-denominational private girls school in Central Africa".

The name of the School, Chisipite, is derived from a spring rising in a nearby vlei. "Chisipiti" is the Shona word for spring. It has also inspired the fountain badge and the motto "Fons vitae caritas".

== Houses ==
Chisipite Senior School has a house system consisting of 4 competitive houses which are Spring, St Paul, Patrons and Anderson. The houses compete in various sporting and cultural activities.

== Sport ==
The following sporting disciplines are available at Chisipite: athletics, basketball, cross country, field hockey, indoor hockey, rowing, soccer, squash, swimming, tennis, volleyball and water polo.

The school's sport facilities include twelve tennis courts, two squash courts, three basketball, courts, three indoor hockey pitches, three volleyball courts, field facilities for up to four hockey and soccer fields and a swimming pool suitable for waterpolo and synchronized swimming.

== Clubs and societies ==
The school has a variety of clubs and societies on offer and they are: Art Club, Authentic Voices of Africa, Bridge Club, Chess Club, Conservation Club, Current Affairs Club, Debate, Drama Club, Eloquence Society, First Aid, Interact Club, Jesus Is For Everyone, Listeners, Mathematics Club, Model United Nations, Orators Society, Science Club, Quiz Club and Toastmasters Society. All girls are expected to be a member of at least one club or society.

== Performing arts ==
=== Drama ===
Pupils in the drama are exposed to numerous workshops, theatre outings, plays and literary evenings to help develop their skills. Annually, a Speech and Drama Eisteddfod is held to test their abilities. Pupils also participate in the Harare International Festival of the Arts and the NIAA (National Institute of the Allied Arts) festivals.

=== Music ===
There are many orchestras, groups and choirs encompassing classical, ethnic and modern music. These include Authentic Voices of Africa choirs, Chapel choirs, Clarinet choir, Drums, Flute choir, Guitar Club, Glee Club, Jazz Band, Junior and Senior Choirs, Madrigals, Marimba Bands, Mbira, Strings Orchestra, Symphony Orchestra and Wind Band. Every year, various musical presentation evenings are held such as the Madrigals evening, Piano evening, Strings evening, Vocal evening, AVA extravaganza, Guitar evening, Wind evening and so forth. A School Musical production is held annually and pupils perform in the Carol Service.

The school also offers ABRSM qualifications for pupils who intend to gain formal qualifications in music.

== Fontanians ==
The alumni of the Chispite Senior School are referred to as Fontanians.

=== Notable Fontanians ===
- Berry Bickle – Zimbabwean artist
- Brooke Bruk-Jackson – Zimbabwean model, beauty pageant titleholder, and Miss Universe Zimbabwe 2023
- Kudzai Sevenzo – Zimbabwean singer, actress, television personality
- Ruvheneko Parirenyatwa – Zimbabwean radio and television talk show host
- Marjorie Ngwenya – British-Zimbabwean actuary
- Gemma Griffiths – Zimbabwean singer-songwriter

== See also ==
- Chisipite Junior School
- List of schools in Zimbabwe
- List of boarding schools in Zimbabwe
- Education in Zimbabwe
