= Zimbabwean English =

Set of varieties of the English language native to Zimbabwe

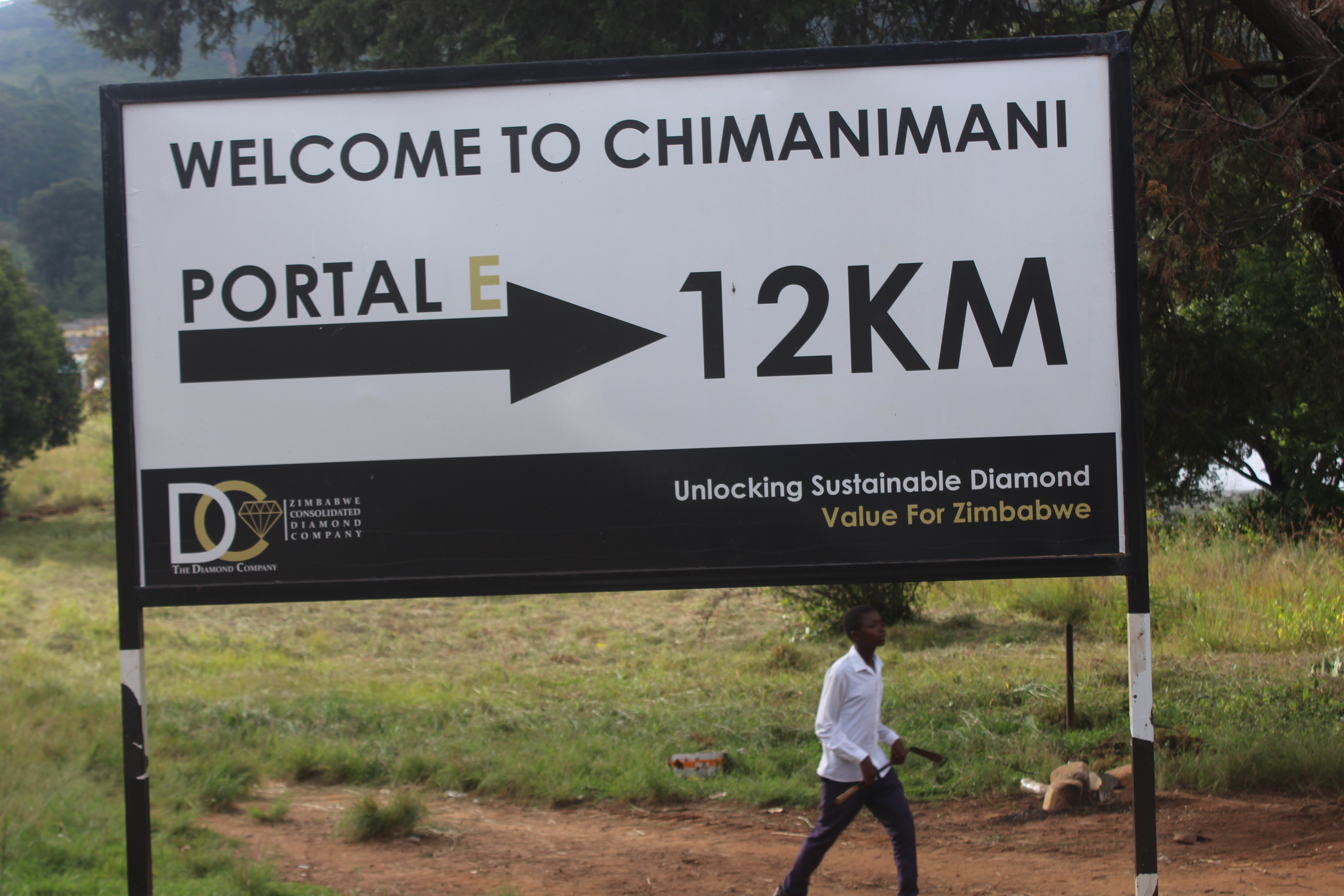
- Signpost in Chimanimani
- Region: Zimbabwe
- Ethnicity: Zimbabweans
- Native speakers: 485,000 (2019); Second language: 5,100,000 (2019)
- Language family: Indo-European: Germanic; West Germanic; Ingvaeonic; Anglo-Frisian; Anglic; English; African English; Zimbabwean English
- Early forms: Old English: Middle English; Early Modern English; Modern English; 19th century British English; 20th century British English
- Writing system: Latin (English alphabet); Unified English Braille

Official status
- Official language in: Zimbabwe

Language codes
- ISO 639-3: –
- IETF: en-ZW

Zimbabwean English (ZimE; en-ZIM; en-ZW) is a regional variety of English found in Zimbabwe. While the majority of Zimbabweans speak Shona (75%) and Ndebele (18%) as a first language, standard English is the primary language used in education, government, commerce and media in Zimbabwe, giving it an important role in society. About 93 percent of the population can speak English fluently or at a high level, and it is the native language of mixed race (Coloured) and White Zimbabweans.

Casual observers tend to have difficulty in placing the Zimbabwean accent, as it differs from those that are clearly from British, South African or other African Englishes; like other English dialects, the accent tends to vary between individuals based on education, class and ethnic background. To Americans, it sounds slightly British, while British speakers find the accent rather old-fashioned and either nasal or somewhat twangy or African-influenced depending on the background of the speaker.

The Zimbabwean education system uses English along with other national languages. Of the languages used in Zimbabwe, it is used nationally and considered the Lingua franca of the country.

== History ==
Zimbabwean English has been called "one of the under researched varieties of English". It primarily shows a mixture of traits typical of British English and to a lesser extent, South African English, and is generally classified as a form of Southern Hemisphere English along with Australian English, New Zealand English, South African English and the lesser known Falkland Islands English, which all descend from southern British English dialects. While Zimbabwean English shares many similarities with southern hemisphere Englishes (Australian, New Zealand, South African), it is distinct from its closest relative, South African English, despite occasional confusion by outsiders. Southern Rhodesia was heavily influenced by South Africa from 1890 until it voted for responsible government in 1923. This along with waves of immigration from the Cape Colony and Orange Free State influenced the early development of English in the country. As a result, most similarities between Zimbabwean English and South African English date from this early period, and were somewhat reinvigorated by post war migration from South Africa.

However, after 1923, the Rhodesian and British Governments increasingly grouped Rhodesia with the Central African colonies and firmly within the British sphere of influence. This led to a divergence between the two Englishes and from then on Zimbabwean English was predominately influenced by British English, with the minor influence of Afrikaans (in comparison with South Africa) and African languages, generally used to describe flora and fauna, with terms such as kopje, dassie and bhundu (Shona for bush). Migration from Britain, especially after World War II, introduced and reinforced many features of dialects from Southern England and to a lesser extent those from the East Midlands and Scotland, which had an impact on local speech. This dialect came to be known as Rhodesian English, typified by speakers such as Ian Smith and P.K. van der Byl.

After independence in 1980, this dialect fell sharply out of favour and came to be regarded as an archaic, non-productive dialect, only spoken by the oldest generation of white Zimbabweans and out of touch, nostalgic Rhodies and whenwes. Zimbabwean English evolved with the changing social, economic and political conditions in which blacks and whites interacted in Zimbabwe; with the old conservative Rhodesian accent being effectively replaced by the more neutral and prestigious sounding cultivated private school accent, which ironically retains some of its features.

Another noticeable trend was a steep decline in the influence of South African English and Afrikaans-derived terminology after 1980, with a notable preference for British English or African-derived alternatives, due to tensions between the Mugabe and apartheid South African governments, though a handful of terms such as braai and voetsek remain (see List of South African slang words). Similarly, bilingual Afrikaner institutions such as the Dutch Reformed Church in South Africa and Eaglesvale Senior School switched to an English-only or English-dominant format, in response to government scrutiny. Today, the main languages spoken in are English, Shona and Ndebele. Only 3.5%, mainly the white, Indian, Asian, coloured (mixed race) and foreign-born minorities, consider English their native language. The vast majority of English speakers are black Zimbabweans, who are bilingual or even trilingual with Bantu languages such as Shona (75%), Ndebele (18%) and the other minority languages, and thus these speakers have an outsize role in influencing the direction of Zimbabwean English, despite traditional native speakers maintaining an important influence.

== Phonetics and phonology ==
English in Zimbabwe is uniformly non-rhotic. This is consistent with other varieties of English in the southern hemisphere. One major difference between the now archaic Rhodesian English and other Englishes of the southern hemisphere is a high pitched nasality or twang noted in speakers such as Ian Smith. This influence remains to a lesser degree in cultivated forms of Zimbabwean English especially as spoken by older Anglo African speakers.

== Characteristics ==
=== Sociocultural ===
==== Cultivated accents ====
Much like Australian and South African English, spoken English exists on a continuum from broad, general to cultivated (see broad and general accents), based on an individual's background, particularly with regards to education, class, income and historically, ethnicity. Affluent, upper middle class and highly educated Zimbabweans speak in a cultivated accent, influenced by older forms of southern British English, especially Received Pronunciation and the now archaic Rhodesian English. The cultivated accent can be viewed as a localised approximation of Received Pronunciation, taught at private, fee-paying day and boarding schools such as Prince Edward School, Arundel School and Peterhouse Boys' School. Indeed, cultivated speakers (such as Peter Ndoro or Tsitsi Dangarembga) can sometimes sound virtually indistinguishable from middle class, privately educated, British Received Pronunciation speakers (though not the British upper class). As such, the accent is only spoken natively by a tiny fraction of the population and denotes prestige and authority, with many dialect speakers dominating spaces such as business, the performing arts, law, journalism, cricket and higher education as late as the late 1990s. Similar accents can be noted in other former British territories such as cultivated Australian and Canadian dainty. The cultivated accent is sometimes humorously mocked by other speakers for its nasality and alleged pretentiousness, with speakers derided as the so-called nose brigades. Robert Mugabe, Brendan Taylor, Pommie Mbangwa, Dave Houghton and journalists Peter Ndoro and Sophie Chamboko are notable speakers of a cultivated accent.

==== Broad accents ====
On the other hand, rural and urban working class speakers, are heavily influenced by their native languages (these groups are also mocked as SRBs whose accents betray their strong rural background). This "broad" variety is most associated with the working class, rural persons, low socioeconomic status, and limited education. These three sub-varieties have also been called "Cultivated ZimE", "General ZimE", and "Broad ZimE", respectively. Broad accents roughly approximates the English as a second-language varieties of English. This variety has been stigmatised by middle and upper middle class English speakers and is considered a vernacular or improper form of Zimbabwean English. A notable trend by broad speakers is a growing preference for English names that are direct translations from African languages. This is largely due to the prestige of English in society, their limited education and the aspiration of parents for their children to move into the middle classes or pursue opportunities abroad. Such names generally appear non-standard to native English speakers and are usually viewed humorously by middle class Zimbabweans and native speakers such as Britons, Americans, Irish people and Australians, when they interact with broad speakers abroad. Examples of such names include Innocent, Fortunate, Blessing and Lovemore. Notable speakers of the broad Zimbabwean accent are Jonathan Moyo and Winky D.

==== General Zimbabwean English ====
Lower middle to middle class black Zimbabweans are by far the largest speakers of Zimbabwean English and are generally the most prominent in the mainstream media, especially since 2000. These speakers generally fall in a spectrum between the two accents with educated accents approximating cultivated accents but without quite the same level of elocution, while lower middle class speakers tend to speak more plainly. As a result, the general accent shows greater variety than other dialects. Indeed, contrary to outside expectations, a number notable of white Zimbabweans, especially those under 45 exhibit features of a general accent, albeit with a hint of nasality. This is largely due to the growth of the internet, circular migration, as well as Zimbabweans of all races interacting with each other on equal terms. Despite this white speakers still form a disproportionate number of cultivated accent speakers. A notable feature of general accents is a tendency to over pronounce certain consonants, than other dialects, such as the hard T, though this is not a feature among white speakers. Speakers of the general dialect tend to have at least a high school education and speak English fluently and natively and are perfectly bilingual.

The aspirational nature of this group, has led to younger speakers becoming more susceptible to influences from other Englishes, particularly pop-culture references from American English (what's up, you guys, chill out, like) that are derided by cultivated speakers who overwhelmingly prefer British conventions and more traditionally minded Zimbabweans who dismiss individuals with such affectations as so called salads (stupid Africans who like (ie copy) American dressing (trends)). Lesser influences include Jamaican patois from the popularity of reggae and dancehall with lower middle class youths and British slang and London English accents due to the growth of Zimbabweans in the United Kingdom. Speakers of this general Zimbabwean accent include: Evan Mawarire, Hamilton Masakadza, Marc Pozzo, Heath Streak, Morgan Tsvangirai and Petina Gappah.

A subset of the general accent is general Zimbabwean English as spoken by younger middle-class, white Zimbabweans, especially those who were born or came of age after 1980. This form of speech eschews the negative connotations of the obsolete Rhodesian dialect and speakers tend to avoid the elocution, nasality (and alleged elitism) of a cultivated private school accent, as they either did not attend the elite institutions where the accent is taught or prefer to downplay it, to sound more relatable or 'cool'. A similar trend can be observed in British English with the development of Estuary English. This concept of communication accommodation, either upwards or downwards in idiolect, can be seen in many social interactions. A speaker aims to put someone at ease by speaking in a familiar tone or intonation, or one can intimidate or alienate someone by speaking more formally. A lot of crossover exists between this sub-variety and the wider general accent, thus it can be difficult to differentiate speakers by ethnicity especially if they have gone to the same schools. Unlike older generations, younger white Zimbabweans tend to have learnt Shona and Ndebele at school and have friends from different backgrounds and nationalities. Also, unlike young black Zimbabweans, a greater proportion of young whites now live abroad, which may lead to the sub-dialect eventually being absorbed by the larger general accent. Examples of speakers of the modern, sub-dialect include Kirsty Coventry, Kyle Jarvis (who retains some cultivated features), Tom Curran, Don Armand, and Dave Ewers.

Today English is spoken by virtually all in the cities, but less so in rural areas. English, the official language, enjoys status dominance and is the language of instruction in education, commerce, the government and the majority of the media.

== Ethnocultural ==
While black and white dialects of Zimbabwean English are well represented in the media, a less prominent and under researched sub-variety of Zimbabwean English is Coloured Zimbabwean English, originally and best associated with inner-city, mixed-race Coloured speakers.

Coloured Zimbabwean English is made up of a range of forms which developed differently in different parts of Zimbabwe, and are said to vary along a continuum, from forms close to general and cultivated Zimbabwean English to more heavy forms, that exhibit a disproportionate influence from South African English and Afrikaans. There are distinctive features of accent, grammar, words and meanings, as well as language use. This influence is due to the fact that the earliest Coloured communities were formed mainly by those who had emigrated as workers and servants of white South African settlers from the Cape Colony and Orange Free State. Coloured immigration from South Africa spiked following a depression after the second Boer War and continued in various waves, as Coloured people emigrated on their own accord in large numbers until Rhodesia's Unilateral Declaration of Independence. Coloured communities were largely segregated from both whites and blacks and as a result formed their own communities where their unique English dialects developed separately. By the 1940s most local Coloureds had been born in Southern Rhodesia as offspring of British administrators and colonists and local women, solidifying the shift away from Afrikaans to English.

While a wave of immigration from South Africa in the eighties boosted the community's numbers, as Coloured South Africans sought refuge from the oppressive apartheid regime. However, since independence, many Coloured Zimbabweans have complained of feeling increasingly disenfranchised, and neglected by the government. A Coloured lobby group, the National Association for the Advancement of Mixed Race Coloureds (NAAC), was formed in 2001 to protest against what they perceived as discrimination against their community by the state. As a result, Coloured English speakers are rarely featured in the media, with the few exceptions such as musician, Andy Brown, either adopting general accents or working in Shona language media. This situation is largely comparable to the status of Cape Flats English which also experiences neglect from the mainstream press and is derided as non-standard. Similarities, exist between the two dialects, however, they have diverged significantly as most Cape Coloureds are largely Afrikaans speaking, while Zimbabwean Coloureds have become universally anglophone or less commonly bilingual with Shona or Ndebele.

ZCE terms, or derivative terms, are sometimes used by the broader Zimbabwean community. Zimbabwean Coloured English is spoken among Coloured people generally, though not all mixed-race people identify as Coloured and not all Coloureds speak the dialect. It is especially evident in what are called "discrete communities", such as the historically Coloured suburbs of Braeside, Arcadia, Hillside, Cranborne and St. Martins in Harare. Black Zimbabweans who live in these communities or have ties to historically Coloured schools (such as Morgan High School and St. Johns High) and sports such as cricket, have partially adopted the dialect but also maintain features of general or cultivated accents based on their education or background. Because most Coloured Zimbabweans are concentrated in urban areas (83%), especially Harare and Bulawayo, coloured dialects are almost exclusively an urban phenomenon. Additionally, like other Zimbabweans, the country's economic crisis, has prompted many to leave the country, leading to a growing diaspora abroad, notably so in the UK (Milton Keynes, Luton, Reading), Cape Town, South Africa and Australia (Perth, Brisbane, Sydney), reducing the dialect almost exclusively to Harare and Bulawayo. Notable speakers of a Coloured accent are comedian Edgar Langeveldt and sporting announcer Ed Rainsford.

=== Lexicon ===
The following are terms used by Coloured English speakers that are either less common or absent in Zimbabwean and other Englishes

- Auntie- A respectful term for an older woman. Black Zimbabweans tend to use similar terms in African languages. Auntie is also used in other Englishes such as Caribbean English, southern African American English and in Māori and Polynesian cultures.
- Barley- Many Coloured people use the word barley in a distinct way, to mean father or a respected older man. Occasionally used by middle class black Zimbabweans, but not widely so.
- Blondie-A naïve, unruly or stupid young woman.
- China- A friend; as in the greeting 'How's it my china?' Likely from Cockney rhyming slang "China plate" (meaning "my mate"); from early British immigrants.
- Cheeky-"Cheeky" may be used to describe a mischievous person, particularly a child.
- Connection- a close friend, mate or a person who can do you a favour.
- Den- Many Coloured people refer to their house as their den, particularly in Harare and the Mashonaland East. This word has also been adopted by young black Zimbabweans, particularly in Harare. The term probably entered youth culture in the late 1990s.
- Dead- Dead is used by many Coloured people to mean boring, or uninteresting, when referring to an event. This usage is not exclusive to Coloured people and can be heard in other forms of English, such as Irish English and Manchester English.
- Dutchman/ Dutchie/(ma)Bhunu- A pejorative term for a white South African especially an Afrikaner. Also used negatively to refer to Afrikaners by other South Africans, but complete absent from other forms of Zimbabwean English.
- Gammon- Victorian era English word for pretend. Still used by some people to mean joking generally as in gammoning. Though virtually unknown by other Zimbabweans it is surprisingly common in Australia, especially as used by Aboriginal people.
- Goffal-A Coloured or mixed-race Zimbabwean or Zambian. Largely unknown by other Zimbabweans who prefer the term coloured. Does not refer to and is largely unknown by Cape Coloureds
- Humbug- Whereas humbug in broader English (see Charles Dickens's Scrooge character) means nonsensical, or unimportant information, humbug in Coloured English means an annoying person who makes inane or repetitive requests. As in 'here comes that humbug again'.
- Kwacha-A worthless item, or an item rapidly losing value. From the Zambian Kwacha. Once commonly used by black Zimbabweans but increasingly obsolete due to the troubles of Zimbabwe's own currency.
- Lighty- a younger person, especially a younger male such as a younger brother or son. From the Afrikaans term, laaitie. Common in South Africa, but largely absent in other Zimbabwean dialects.
- Late- Dead, a deceased person; An indirect or respectful way of referring to a person who has died, as 'his father is late'. In Coloured culture and black Zimbabwean culture more generally, a person is rarely referred to as deceased directly.
- Nyasas/ Nyasalanders- Malawian (and less commonly Zambian) immigrants and their descendants, may be considered pejorative. Also used by black Zimbabweans especially older speakers.
- Moscans-Mozambique or Portuguese-speaking immigrants (though not Portuguese people). More common in eastern Zimbabwe, especially Harare, Mashonaland East and Manicaland.
- Oan/ Own- A friend; especially male, as in the phrase 'That's my oan'. Absent in other Zimbabwean dialects, though sometimes used by black and white Zimbabweans who interact with Coloured people. Its origin is unclear but maybe connected to the South African term oke, which carries the same meaning but is virtually unused in Zimbabwean English.
- Porkies- Lies, as in 'you're telling me porkies'. From Cockney rhyming slang, i.e. lies = pork pies, hence porkies.
- Scheme- To think, or to do (e.g. "I scheme we should go home now"; usage evolved from the hyperbole "What are you scheming?" asked of a person deep in thought.). Also used in South African English
- Yarn- English word for a long story, often with incredible or unbelievable events. Originally a sailors' expression, "to spin a yarn", in reference to stories told while performing mundane tasks such as spinning yarn. Among Coloured people, it has become a verb, to ramble or tell tall tales. Often, Yarning.

== Differences from South African English ==
Many of these relate to words used to refer to common items, often based on which major brands become eponyms.

Zimbabwe	South Africa	Meaning
Location, high-density suburb	Township	An impoverished formally designated residential area, largely populated by the poor, working class and immigrants on the margins of urban areas.
A Levels	Matric	School-leaving certificate or the final year of high school or a student in the final year. Matric short for matriculation. A levels is short for Advanced level certificate as Zimbabwean education follows British convention.
Cottage crib (Note: Guesthouse or holiday home.)	Shack, Langhuis (long house mostly Western Cape)	a small, often very modest, guesthouse or holiday property, often near mountains or at the seaside. In South Africa a shack can also mean a poorly built home usually made from corrugated iron, malocation is a Shona/English hybrid for the same term in Zimbabwe.
Tuck shop	Cafe, tea room (Durban mostly), spaza (informal)	Convenience store, a small store selling mainly food
vagrant, benzi (from Shona, considered derogatory)	Bergie	A homeless or vagrant person.
cinema	bioscope, bio (increasingly dated)	cinema; movie theatre
sandals, slippers	Slops, plakkies	Flip-flops
hut	rondeval	a hut; a round or conic-shaped building, usually with a thatched roof.
stand, plot	erf (from Afrikaans)	a plot of land in an urban area
mbanje (from Shona); marijuana	dagga	marijuana
sunshower	monkey's wedding	A sunshower
make a plan.	make a plan	To be resourceful in the face of a challenge. The phrase make a plan is mostly used by urban or middle-class people in Zimbabwe, and is rarely encountered in rural parts of the country.
tennis shoes matennis (Shona/English hybrid, informal), increasingly trainers (from Britons of Zimbabwean descent)	tackies, takkies, tekkies	sneakers, trainers. Tennis shoes is understood by South Africans, but considered overly formal.
Hoover, to hoover	Vacuum cleaner, to vacuum	Similar to the UK and Ireland the term "hoover" (properly as a common noun) has long been colloquially synonymous with "vacuum cleaner" and the verb "to vacuum" in Zimbabwe (e.g., "you were hoovering the carpet"), referring to the Hoover Company's dominance there during the early to mid 20th century.
no through road	no exit	Signage for a road with a dead end, a cul-de-sac
swimming costume, swimming trunks	swimming costume or “cozzie”	Swimwear or other clothes designed to be worn in water.
Maize	Mielies	an ear of maize (from Afrikaans mielie)
Motorway, dual-carriageway	Freeway, Highway, less commonly Motorway	The terms "freeway", "highway", and "motorway" are used synonymously in South Africa, while the terms freeway and highway can cause confusion in Zimbabwe, as they are not widely understood due to the lack of controlled-access highways.
Sadza (from Shona); Mealie Meal	Pap	Porridge-like dish made from cornmeal.
Magic marker; felt pen felt tips highlighter	Koki; marker; marker pen, highlighter	A marker pen
Pickup truck / Open truck	Bakkie	a single or double cab utility vehicle with or without a canopy.
hiking; bushwalking; bush ranging	trekking; bushwalking (or less commonly) hiking	Travel through open, woodland or forest areas on foot

== See also ==
- List of English words of Afrikaans origin
- South African English
- Australian English
- New Zealand English
- Commonwealth English
- British diaspora in Africa
- English in southern England
- Regional accents of English
