= Rody =

Rody may refer to:

== People ==
=== Surname ===
- George E. Rody (1899–1956), U.S. basketball coach
- Vaughan Rody (born 1968), Canadian ice hockey official

=== Nickname ===
- Roderick Rijnders (1941–2018), Dutch rower
- Rodrigo Duterte (born 1945), former President of the Philippines
- Rody Cooney (1902–1965), American basketball player
- Rody Kenny Courtice (1891–1973), Canadian artist
- Rody Lacap (born 1950), Filipino cinematographer
- Rody Nealon (1898–1988), Irish hurler and Gaelic games administrator
- Rody Vera (born 1960), Filipino playwright, theater actor, and director

=== Given name ===
- Rody de Boer (born 1997), Dutch footballer
- Rody Junior Effaghe (born 2004), Gabonese footballer
- Rody Gorman (born 1960), Irish Scottish poet
- Rody Kirwan (1878–1959), Irish Gaelic footballer
- Rody Tolassy (born 1987), French politician from Guadeloupe
- Rody Walker, Canadian musician in the band Protest the Hero

== Characters ==
- Rody, in the 1989 video game Rody & Mastico

== See also ==
- Rodi (disambiguation)
- Roady (disambiguation)
- Roadie (disambiguation)
- Rhody (disambiguation)
- Rhodie, a colloquial term for a white Zimbabwean or expatriate Rhodesian
- Rhodey, or War Machine, a Marvel Comics superhero
- Bernard Shandon Rodey (1856–1927), Irish-American politician
- Rodey, New Mexico, U.S.
