= Arcadia, Harare =

Arcadia
- Suburb
- Location within Zimbabwe
- Coordinates: 17°49′15″S 31°02′57″E
- Country: Zimbabwe
- Province: Harare
- District: Harare
- Founded: 1931

Government

Area
  - Urban: 4.5 km^{2} (1.7 sq mi)
- Elevation: 1,439 m (4,721 ft)

Population (2012)
  - Suburb: 12,489
  - Density: 5,055.3/km^{2} (13,093/sq mi)
- estimated
- Time zone: UTC+2 (CAT)
  - Summer (DST): UTC+2 (not observed)

Arcadia, is a small, historic working class suburb, southeast of central Harare and just south of the main railway line that divides the CBD and from its southern suburbs. The area along with nearby, Breaside, St Martins and Hillside, is traditionally a predominately Coloured neighbourhood, who still maintain a majority in the area, though the area has diversified significantly since the 1980s. The current neighbourhood was the second mostly Coloured area developed in the city since the 1930s.

Originally, the first black and Coloured neighbourhood was on the south side of area of the Salisbury Kopje and Pioneer Street, after the area was abandoned by businesses in favour of the Causeway area and Manica Road. In time, government and commercial buildings dominated central Harare displacing blacks and coloureds into Highfield and Arcadia respectively.

== History ==
Arcadia has long been home to many Coloured Zimbabwean, Asian and Cape Coloured immigrants. Mixed race people began to move into the area in the beginning in the 1930s, having been displaced from the area near the Kopje and Pioneer Street by the development of the Causeway commercial government office complexes.

In 1956, Morgan High School was established to serve the Coloured community in the area and named after Leonard Ray Morgan, the first permanent Secretary for Education in the Federation of Rhodesia & Nyasaland. The school quickly became the hub of many Coloured and Asian communities in Harare, home to the few educational and sporting institutions that had a mixed race majority. The sports team are known as Stallions, excelled in cricket and football producing players who would later feature for the national team, such as Ali Shah and Dion Ebrahim. Today, Morgan is recognised as a leading intuition of the local Coloured residents.

Other notable institutions include Arcadia Sports Club, noted for its cricket prowess and Arcadia Community Centre.

== Features ==
The area has always been a working-class neighbourhood, and understanding Arcadia and Braeside's place in Harare is to know how Harare developed. Harare started from a small fort by the Kopje and Causeway stream; and expanded north and east towards Mount Hampden. The main railway to Bulawayo is located just south of the CBD, which is where Arcadia developed as the housing for mixed race and Asian people to provide cheap labour for industry nearby.

Arcadia was a mid-20th century suburb. It was a rural area prior to the 1930s. Starting in the early 1950s there was a rapid housing boom, as soldiers returned from World War Two and an economic boom following the establishment of the Federation of Rhodesia and Nyasaland. A significant mixed race population migrated there, mostly from the Kopje area, and established a thriving community. Several hundred families built and maintained their own churches. By the mid-1990s, the coloured community was increasingly stagnating and the Asian population diminished as they moved further east to Greendale and other eastern areas.

In the 1950s and 1960s nearby many Coloured workers were drawn to the area due to its proximity to Willowvale, Southerton and Workington which offered attractive industrial employment and where they competed for jobs with Africans in Highfield and attracted Portuguese and Italian immigrants in nearby Willowvale and Avenues, most of whom came directly from Portugal and Mozambique, and the poorest of whom settled in Arcadia close to the railway.

A number of Greek immigrants settled in the neighbourhood from the mid-1950s through the 1970s, both from nearby Eastlea, Avenues and directly from Greece and Cyprus. A few coloureds such as academic and author, Brian Raftopoulos have Greek heritage as a result of this era, though today most Greeks have moved on to wealthier suburbs or emigrated to the United Kingdom. Similarly, many younger Coloured people increasingly emigrate after school, joining the ranks of the Zimbabwean diaspora, leaving mostly families with young children and older residents in the area.

Since the 1990s, most of the immigrant population coming to Arcadia are from Mozambique, Congo and Malawi as well as lower middle class black Zimbabweans, and a dwindling population of Asians. Arcadia remains one of Zimbabwe's most ethnically diverse neighbourhoods.

== Sports ==
Many sports are popular in the Arcadia and Braeside area, dating back to the now defunct. Arcadia United soccer team that played at nearby Danny Bismark Stadium. The primary sports of choice for the locals are soccer, field hockey and cricket.

Practice and playing areas for cricket with cricket cages are at Arcadia Sports Club.

In soccer, recent attempts have been made to revive Arcadia United FC, a championship mixed-race side from the 1970s and 1980s before it folded in the nineties. Several diasporic chapters exist in the UK and Australia and there are attempts to revive a side that can compete in the Zimbabwe Premier Soccer League.

== Points of interest ==
- Morgan High School Harare
- Arcadia Sports Club
- Danny Bismarck Stadium
- Arcadia Community Centre

== See also ==
- Coloured Zimbabweans
- Cape Coloured
- Zimbabwean English
- Cricket in Zimbabwe
