= Roadie (disambiguation) =

Roadie refers to support personnel who travel with a band on tour.

Roadie or roadies may also refer to:

== Arts and entertainment ==
- Roadie (1980 film), a 1980 film starring Meat Loaf
- Roadie (2011 film), a 2011 American comedy film
- Roadies (TV series), an American television series created by Cameron Crowe airing on Showtime
- MTV Roadies, a reality television show on MTV India
- "Roadie", a song by Tenacious D from Rize of the Fenix
- Road Dogg (born 1969), wrestler formerly known as "The Roadie"

== Company ==
- Roadie (app)
- Roadies Restaurant and Bar, a restaurant at the Penn's Peak mountaintop entertainment venue in Jim Thorpe, Pennsylvania.

== See also ==
- Rhodie, expatriate Zimbabweans
- Rodi (disambiguation)
- Rody (disambiguation)
- Roady (disambiguation)
- Rhody (disambiguation)
