= Lankhor =

French video game developer and publisher

- Industry: Video games
- Founded: 1987; 39 years ago
- Founder: Jean-Luc Langlois and Kilkhor
- Defunct: October 2, 2002
- Headquarters: Clamart, France
- Key people: Jean-Luc Langlois, Daniel Macre

Lankhor was a French video game developer based in Clamart, France. The company was founded in 1987 by Jean-Luc Langlois and Kyilkohr. Lankhor was known for developing Mortville Manor, the first video game to feature speech synthesis during gameplay.

In 1998, the company won the award for the Best French Company by the magazine Génération 4.

== History ==
Lankhor was founded in 1987 as a result of the merger between Kyilkohr creations and Béatrice & Jean-Luc Langlois. Lankhor gained fame with productions such as the arcade game Wanderer (1987) by the Langlois siblings and, above all, the adventure games Mortville Manor and Maupiti Island. Mortevielle by Gourier and Bernard Grélaud was published for the first time in 1986 on the Sinclair QL platform, but in the refreshed version of Lankhor (with a new title board and speech synthesizer) was successful a significant commercial success, repeated by Maupiti Island. Another commercial success for Lankhor was the racing game Vroom, simulating the competition during Formula 1. Mortevielle, Maupiti Island and Vroom were awarded Tilt d'Or statuettes, awarded by the industry magazine Tilt.

From 1994, the company abandoned its publishing activities to devote itself solely to development. At the beginning of 1996, Daniel Macré having joined Jean-Luc Langlois in the company management, signed a development contract for Formula 1 games under FIA license with the British publisher Eidos Interactive. In 2000, Lankhor was developing video games for Microïds including Ski Park Manager which was released in 2002. The company however experienced a difficult financial situation which started at the end of the same year; this situation led the company to cancel its contract with Video System, a Japanese video game distribution house. At the end of 2001, Lankhor announced its closure which came to pass on October 3, 2002.

== Games ==
Year	Title
1987	Mortville Manor
1987	No (Never Outside!)
1987	Wanderer
1988	Elemental
1988	G.Nius
1988	Killdozers
1988	Rody & Mastico
1988	Troubadours
1990	Maupiti Island
1990	Raiders
1990	Saga
1990	Sdaw
1990	La Secte Noire
1991	Alive
1991	Alcantor
1991	Burglar
1991	Fugitif
1991	Infernal House
1991	La Crypte Des Maudits
1991	La Malédiction
1991	Le Trésor D'Ali Gator
1991	Mokowe
1991	Outzone
1991	Vroom
1992	Silva
1992	Survivre
1993	Black Sect
1993	F1
1995	Kawasaki Superbike Challenge
1998	New Order Liberation
1999	Official Formula One Racing
2000	F-1 World Grand Prix
2000	Warm Up!
2002	Ski Park Manager

== Bibliography ==
- Ribault, Thomas (2019). Épopée: Tales from French Game Developers. New Jersey: Hardcore Gaming 101. ISBN 9781798244968.
