= DJ Rimo Jackson =

Zimbabwean Disk jockey

Dj Rimo Jackson also known as Dj Rimo is a Zimbabwean club and touring disc jockey and recording artist based in Zimbabwe .

Born Tinotenda Takunda Marimo in Harare, Zimbabwe, he was raised in the city. He attended Alex Park primary school, followed by St George's College and later Prince Edward High School for his secondary education. Dj Rimo began his career in 2009. In 2010, he gained wider recognition after serving as a tour DJ for artists including Akon, Sean Paul and Beenie Man during their performances in Zimbabwe. Since then, he has worked with several international artists visiting Zimbabwe, including Lil Kim, Fat Joe and the South African DJ duo Major League Djz. In 2021, DJ Rimo was listed by Pulse Magazine Ghana among African DJs to watch in 2022. In 2022, he received the Best Male DJ award at the African Social Entertainment Awards, held in South Africa in December..

In 2023, Dj Rimo released his debut single, Vele Malume.
