= Maupiti Island (video game) =

1990 video game

- Developer: Lankhor
- Publishers: Lankhor; Ubi Soft
- Directors: Bruno Gourier; Jean-Luc Langlois; Christian Droin
- Designer: Dominique Sablons
- Programmer: Bruno Gourier; Christian Droin; Jean-Luc Langlois
- Writer: Sylvian Bruchon
- Composer: Andre Bescont
- Platforms: Amiga, Atari ST, MS-DOS
- Release: 1990
- Genre: Adventure
- Mode: Single-player

Maupiti Island is a point-and-click adventure game developed and published by Lankhor. It was released in 1990 and is the sequel to Mortville Manor. The player controls Jérôme Lange, a detective attempting to solve a crime by interacting with various characters and collecting clues while further events unveil a complex plot.

== Gameplay and plot ==
Maupiti Island is a graphical point-and-click adventure game. Time plays an important role in the gameplay. Depending on the time, the various characters switch between the 28 different locations and certain events only occur at a specific time and place. as Jérôme Lange, the player must uncover clues and objects in dialogue with the people present and by examining the various scenes in order to uncover the mystery of the criminal case.

Maupiti Island is set in the year 1954. The premise of the game begins with Jérôme Lange on a trip to Japan from Madagascar but when a hurricane happens, his boat gets on an anchor in a tiny colonial outpost in the Indian Ocean. During the night, a woman named Marie disappears. Jérôme Lange is in charge of the investigation.

== Reception ==
Reception

Review scores
Publication	Score
ACE	504/999
Amiga Action	83%
Amiga Power	73%
Joker Sonderheft	83 % 81 %

Maupiti Island was a great artistic success in France. A columnist for Joystick praised the game for its "solid script" and "superb execution". The game received mixed reviews. While the graphics were mostly praised, there were criticisms of the plot and the pace of the game. At times the title has been compared to Delphine's Cruise for a Corpse. Jeux & Stratégie discussed that Maupiti Island brings fans of highly complicated detective genre and how it's strange for small games to have imitated literature in their own way. They also questioned about the speech synthesizer as it's not mastered. PC Gamer writer Richard Cobbett felt that despite the game only takes ten minutes to complete, it's have a legitimately clue which has could go on for months or years. He also discussed that the game was an attempt to create a more realistic detective plot, and played out in pseudo-realtime, with characters constantly moving around the island. He praised the game's graphics and speech synthesizer.

== Cancelled sequel ==
Sukiya was going to be a sequel of Maupiti Island. The plot was to take place in Japan and was meant to feature a playing interface similar to Maupiti Island's. The game was supposed to be released in early 1993 but the game was never released due to financial difficulties within the company and low sales of their then-most recent adventure game Black Sect. Sukiya was seemingly in an advanced stage when the decision to halt development was made. In 2019, a crowdfunding project tried to finance a remake but did not find sufficient financial support.

== See also ==
- Mortville Manor
