= Killdozer (disambiguation) =

Killdozer is a nickname for the modified bulldozer used by Marvin Heemeyer in a June 2004 rampage in Granby, Colorado, United States.

Killdozer may also refer to:

- "Killdozer!" (short story), a 1944 story by Theodore Sturgeon
- Killdozer! (film), a 1974 ABC television film based on the Sturgeon story
- Killdozer (band), 1983–1996 American noise rock band
- Killdozer, a ring name used by professional wrestler Matt Tremont
- Killdozer, vehicle in "The Cursed Earth" (Judge Dredd story), a 1978 storyline in 2000 AD
- Killdozers, a 1988 video game

== See also ==
- Armoured bulldozer
