= Samuel Levy =

Samuel Levy may refer to:

- Samuel Levy (politician) (1876–1953), American lawyer, businessman, and Manhattan borough president
- Samuel D. Levy (1860–1940), Jewish-American lawyer and judge from New York City
- Sam Levy (1929–2012), Zimbabwean businessman and property developer
