= Rodi =

Rodi may refer to:

== Places ==
- Rodi (Prato Leventina), a Swiss village and hamlet of Prato Leventina, Canton of Ticino
- Rodi Garganico, an Italian municipality in the province of Foggia, Apulia
- Rodì Milici, an Italian municipality in the province of Messina, Sicily
- Rodi e Kollatës, mountain peak in the Prokletije range in northern Albania
- Rhodes, Greek island called Rodi in Italian

== People ==
=== Surname ===
- Robert Rodi (born 1956), American novelist, playwright, comic book writer, essayist and performance artist
- Sani Yakubu Rodi (1975 or 1981–2002), Nigerian executed murderer
- Thomas John Rodi (born 1949), American prelate of the Roman Catholic Church

=== Given name ===
- Rodi Duarte (born 1991), Cape Verdean footballer
- Rodi Ferreira (born 1998), Paraguayan footballer
- Rodi Kratsa-Tsagaropoulou (born 1953), Greek politician and member of the European Parliament

== Other ==
- Rodi language, a language spoken in Norway
- Rodi, another name for the Rodiya, an untouchable caste amongst the Sinhalese people of Sri Lanka

== See also ==
- Rhodes (disambiguation)
- Roady (disambiguation)
- Roadie (disambiguation)
- Rhody (disambiguation)
- Rhodie
- Rhodey
