= Hartmann House Preparatory School =

Location
- 3 Borrowdale Rd, Borrowdale; Harare; Zimbabwe; 17.804524°S 31.057159°E

Information
- Type: Independent, preparatory school
- Motto: Ex Fide Fiducia (Latin: Out Of/From Faith Comes Confidence)
- Denomination: Catholic
- Founded: 1957
- Rector: Fr Joe Arimoso SJ
- Headmaster: Luke Dancer
- Grades: 0/R to 7
- Gender: Boys
- Enrollment: 311 (2016)
- Campus type: Suburban
- Houses: 4
- Colours: Red and white
- Nickname: HH
- Tuition: US$1,900.00 (Note: Termly fees, the year has 3 terms.)
- Feeder to: St. George's College, Harare
- Affiliations: ATS; CHISZ; University of Cambridge Local Examinations Syndicate
- Website: www.hartmannhouse.co.zw

Hartmann House Preparatory School (or Hartmann House, also referred to as HH) is an independent, preparatory, day school for boys in Harare, Zimbabwe. The school was founded in 1957 and named after Fr Hartmann SJ, a chaplain to the Pioneer Column who lived at St. George's College, Harare.

Hartmann House Preparatory School is a member of the Association of Trust Schools (ATS) and the Head is a member of the Conference of Heads of Independent Schools in Zimbabwe (CHISZ).

== History ==
In 1957 about 30 years after St George's College relocated to Salisbury (now Harare), it was decided to build a separate preparatory school on the newly acquired land near the Borrowdale Road. It was realised that junior boys had a need of quite different teaching styles and care as compared to the senior boys. A fine building was opened as Hartmann House in 1957. It had three Jesuit priests on the staff- Fr Farwell as housemaster with Fr Nixon and Fr Walsh plus some lay teachers. There were 6 classes of 25 boys each in Standards 4 and 5 with 100 of these in boarding on the upper floors. The 100 boarders mostly came from Zambia and the farming areas.

At Independence, the pressure for day school places grew and declined for boarding. The boarding hostel was phased out in favour of classroom space in 1980. The hostel was completely closed in 1993. Hartmann House has developed extensively with several buildings having been erected thereafter which included the recently completed Golden Jubilee Hall.

== The Crest ==
The Grant of Arms was made by the Royal College of Heralds on 19 October 1931 and aimed to recognise three outstanding characteristics:

- The first denoted the foundation and management of Hartmann House by the Jesuits, signified by the inclusion of two black wolves and the cauldron, as taken from the family arms of the Loyola Family, St. Ignatius Loyola was the founder of the Society of the Jesus or the Jesuit Fathers, and in Basque "loy" means wolf and "olla" means cauldron.
- The second characteristic, that of the location of the college in the then-Rhodesia and a play on the Greek word Rhoden, meaning rose, is the symbol of an attractive flower that exists in many different forms, colours and perfumes. It is hardy and can flourish almost anywhere precisely because it is a hybrid of so many varieties.
- The third characteristic is the dedication to Father Hartmann, the School's patron, as depicted by the inclusion of the Red Cross from his banner and the hilt of the sword facing upwards. This symbolises the Saint's triumph and incidentally that of Christianity, over the powers of evil (as represented by the dragon's wings) and man's redemption through the death of Jesus Christ.
- The motto on the scroll means "From Faith Comes Confidence".

== Developments ==
Hartmann House has expanded its intake of pupils by incorporating Grade 0 to 7 in one preparatory school. The year 2017 saw the commencement of Grade 0 and Grade 1 classes. That same year saw the school commencing the Cambridge Primary program, developed and examined by Cambridge International Examinations.

== Notable alumni ==
- John Rennie – cricketer

== See also ==
- St. George's College, Harare
- List of schools in Zimbabwe
