= Rhody =

Rhody may refer to:

- Rhody (or Little Rhody), a nickname for the U.S. state of Rhode Island
- Rhody the Ram, the mascot for the University of Rhode Island
- Rhody, a nickname for the Washington State Ferry ship MV Rhododendron
- Rhododendron, a type of flowering plant
- Go Tell Aunt Rhody, English language folk song of 19th century American origin

== People ==
- James Rhody (fl. 1896–1924), American soccer player
- Rhody Hathaway (1868–1944), American actor

== See also ==
- Rhodey, a Marvel Comics character
- Rhodie, a colloquial term for a white Zimbabwean or expatriate Rhodesian
- Roadie (disambiguation)
- Roady (disambiguation)
- Rodi (disambiguation)
