= Mokowe (video game) =

1991 video game

- Publisher(s): Lankhor
- Platform(s): Amstrad CPC
- Release: 1991
- Genre(s): Adventure

Mokowe is a 1991 adventure game published by Lankhor for the Amstrad CPC. It was developed by Jean-Pierre Godey and J-C. Lebon, who had previously developed La Secte Noire.

== Plot ==
The game is set in May 1975, Kenya, within the region of Mokowe. It is a time of elephant killing, ivory trading, and a secret network. It is the player's task to intervene and put a stop to it.

== Gameplay ==
Players must uncover clues and complete puzzles in order to complete the game. The game makes use of time as a gameplay mechanic, as players must respond to changes in weather and the flood levels in the rivers. Additionally, human and animal NPCs only emerge at certain times of day during the in-game clock.

== Reception ==
The game received mostly positive reviews from critics, with praise for its graphics and atmosphere. A review from Tilt awarded the game a "B" score and recommended it for young children as a beginner's example of a micro-adventure, noting its simple gameplay and detailed graphics. By contrast, issue #34 of Amstrad Cent Pour Cent described it as "a beautiful and hard game. What am I saying, very hard, in which you die very easily (don't be scared, I told you much earlier, it's pure fiction). To overcome it, you need to have in your luggage limitless patience, a taste for snooping everywhere and above all logic that would make your CPC pale." The magazine gave it a score of 82%. An article in Amstrad Cent Pour Cent issue #38 also emphasized that Mokowe was more difficult than its notoriously difficult predecessor La Secte Noire.

It received a score of 62% from Joystick. The reviewer praised the premise of the game but criticized the lack of originality, writing "The originality fairy didn't deign to strike the Mokowe programmers with the tip of her magic wand. They brought us The Black Sect, and now they're back with another adventure game identical in its functionality to the previous one. As long as there are fans, why not?"

Joystick felt the game would be an ideal present for Christmas. MicroNews wrote that despite the danger of the quest, it was well worth taking a dive into the game.
