= Roady =

Roady may refer to:

- Road crew, or roadie
- Dennis Roady (born 1983), U.S. internet personality
- Roady's Truck Stops, a U.S. truck stop chain

== See also ==
- Roadie (disambiguation)
- Rodi (disambiguation)
- Rody (disambiguation)
- Rhody (disambiguation)
