= Saga (1990 video game) =

- Publisher(s): Lankhor
- Platform(s): Amstrad CPC
- Release: 1990
- Genre(s): Role-playing video game
- Mode(s): Single-player, multiplayer

Saga is a 1990 role-playing video game developed by French game developer Lankhor. It was released on the Amstrad CPC.

== Overview ==
Saga takes place in the 13th century. Players can choose to play as one of six classes: assassin, priest, elf, paladin, warrior, or magician. Each character class has a different set of traits which determine their strength, dexterity, luck, intelligence, hit points, and magic points. The player character must leave the enchanted forest and go to the city of Heprena to rescue their former mentor, the magician Merlux, after he sends them a cryptic message asking warning them that Heprena is in peril.

The game includes both a single-player and a two-player mode. It has a short campaign and is considered a micro-RPG.

== Reception ==
The game received mostly positive reviews from critics at the time of its release. A review from Tilt praised its atmosphere, respect for traditional RPG mechanics, and support for two-player mode. Amstrad Cent Pour Cent gave it a score of 92%, with praise for its two-color graphics and gameplay. Joystick gave the game a score of 67%, praising the two-player mode and good graphical resolution but criticizing its lack of originality.

Georges Brize, in a review for Micro News, wrote that "Despite its two-color graphics, Saga undoubtedly stands out as the richest adventure game released on CPC in a long time."
