= G.Nius =

1988 action video game

- Developer: Lankhor
- Platforms: Amiga, Atari ST
- Release: 1988
- Genre: Action

G.Nius is a 1988 French action video game developed by Lankhor for Amiga and Atari ST.

== Plot ==
The player is a robot named G.Nius who has crash-landed his spaceship. He needs to escape the ship before it vaporizes by visiting every room to turn off a switch.

== Development ==
The game experienced significant distribution problems. The game was prevented from being sold in parts of France.

== Reception ==
The Games Machine felt the game could be annoying and confusing at times. ACE magazine praised the frenetic, zany action, as well as the aesthetics.
