= Leonard Ray Morgan =

Rhodesian politician (1894–1967)

Leonard Ray Morgan CBE (1894–1967) was the first permanent Secretary for Education in the Federation of Rhodesia and Nyasaland.

== Biography ==
=== Early life and education ===
Morgan, whose father was a Sergeant in the Royal Artillery, was born on 11 January 1895 in the Panmure Barracks, Montrose, Angus, Scotland. He emigrated to the newly established town of Umtali, Rhodesia at about the age of eight years and spent the rest of his life there.

He was educated at Prince Edward School in Salisbury, Rhodesia. He subsequently graduated (BSc) from Rhodes University College in Grahamstown, South Africa before joining the Rhodesia Regiment from January 1916 to April 1917.

He served with the British forces in the East Africa campaign in the First World War where he saw action in Wami and other locations. In 1918 he transferred to the Royal Air Force as a Cadet Pilot, with No. 2 Cadet Wing, No. 5 Training Depot Station at Easton-on-the-Hill Aerodrome in Lincolnshire. In March 1919, he received a commission as an Honorary 2nd Lieutenant. However, the war ended before he had an opportunity to fly operationally. Following his discharge from the military, he won a Rhodes Scholarship to St John's College, Oxford, where he obtained a degree in civil engineering. During his time at Oxford, he was a close personal friend of the poet, Robert Graves (and his brother, John, both fellow students at St. John's College) with whom he remained in contact for the remainder of his life.

=== Career ===
While in England, he met, and subsequently married, a Swiss French governess, working for Lord Halifax, Mlle Madeleine ('Madi') Petitmaitre, the daughter of a butcher from Yverdon in the Canton de Vaud. They returned to Rhodesia where he took up a schools career as a mathematics teacher. He advanced rapidly and was successively Headmaster of three famous Rhodesian schools; Milton High School in Bulawayo and Chaplin High School in Gwelo (where he was Headmaster of the future Prime Minister of Rhodesia, Ian Smith) and in Salisbury at Prince Edward School.

He was then transferred to the Ministry of Education and subsequently appointed as the first permanent Secretary for Education in the Federal Government. Morgan modelled the Rhodesian school system on the English grammar schools and they were considered to be some of the finest state schools in the world at the time. He also played a prominent role in the advancement of African (i.e. black) education during the years of Federation (1953–1961).

=== Marriage and children ===
While in England, he met and subsequently married, a Swiss French governess, working for Lord Halifax, Mlle Helène Annette ('Madi') Petitmaitre, the daughter of a butcher from Yverdon in the Canton de Vaud. The couple had two daughters, Anne (b. 1926, d. 2002) and Denise Helene (b. 1931, d. 2012).

=== Death and afterward ===
Morgan died on 5 June 1967. Morgan High School in Salisbury (today Harare) was named after him.

== Awards ==
- 1956 New Year Honours: Commander of the Order of the British Empire.
