= Wanderer (video game) =

1986 video game

- Developer: Lankhor
- Publisher: Pyramide Soft
- Platforms: Amiga, Amstrad CPC, Atari ST, Commodore 64, Sinclair QL, ZX Spectrum
- Release: WW: 1986
- Genre: Action

Wanderer is a 1986 action video game developed by Lankhor and published by Pyramide Soft. It was released on Amiga, Amstrad CPC, Atari ST, Commodore 64, Sinclair QL, and ZX Spectrum. The game was authored by Béatrice & Jean-Luc Langlois. It has the distinction of being Lankhor's first game. It was edited by Pyramid for QL and Atari ST, and then licensed to Elite. Wanderer 3D was released by Encore in 1990.

== Plot ==
Set in a future where cats have become very valuable, the protagonist's cat has been kidnapped and the kidnapper is asking for an 8000 cat ransom. The player has to visit planets, barter cats, and play a card game to win cats. Visiting new planets engages a straight action sequence of shooting all enemy ships.

== Reception ==
The Games Machine felt that gameplay was slow and repetitious, and relied too heavily on an average 3D effect. Computer and Video Games felt the overused 3D effect didn't make up for the vacuous gameplay. ZZap!64 criticised the boring gameplay and underused 3D.
