= F-1 World Grand Prix =

1998 video game

- North American Nintendo 64 cover art
- Developers: Paradigm Entertainment (N64); Video System (DC, GBC); Lankhor (PS1, Win)
- Publishers: Nintendo 64, Game Boy Color; Video System; Dreamcast: JP/NA: Video System; PAL: Sega; PlayStation: NA: Eidos Interactive; EU: Video System; Windows: NA/EU: Eidos Interactive; JP: Tsukuda Original
- Director: Wes Hoffman
- Composer: Dan Hess
- Series: F-1 Grand Prix
- Platforms: Nintendo 64, Dreamcast, PlayStation, Game Boy Color, Windows
- Release: 27 July 1998: Nintendo 64; NA: 27 July 1998; EU: 14 September 1998; JP: 18 December 1998 Dreamcast; EU: 19 November 1999; JP: 25 November 1999; NA: 25 April 2000 PlayStation; NA: 30 November 1999; EU: 17 December 1999 Game Boy Color; EU: July 1999; JP: 1 October 2000 Windows; EU: 16 June 2000; NA: 21 June 2000; JP: 29 September 2000
- Genre: Sim racing
- Modes: Single-player, multiplayer

F-1 World Grand Prix is a Formula One racing game/sim developed by Paradigm Entertainment, first released in 1998 for the Nintendo 64 game console, and later for the Dreamcast, Microsoft Windows, PlayStation, and Game Boy Color. The Nintendo 64 version is based on the 1997 Formula One season, featuring each of the 17 circuits from the season and all 22 drivers (as well as two unlockable bonus racers), with the exceptions of Jacques Villeneuve (licensing reason) and the MasterCard Lola team (not recognised, as they did not take part in any races during the season).

The Dreamcast and Game Boy Color versions are based on the 1998 Formula One season and the PlayStation (released as F1 World Grand Prix: 1999 Season) and Windows versions are based on the 1999 Formula One season. The Windows version is a sequel to the 1999 video game Official Formula One Racing.

== Gameplay ==
The game has five gameplay modes: Grand Prix, a course-by-course simulation of the 1997 season; Exhibition, a single race; Time Trial, a race against the clock; Challenge, which comprises real scenarios from the 1997 season, including trying to win the 1997 Hungarian Grand Prix as Damon Hill or beating Jean Alesi as David Coulthard in the 1997 Italian Grand Prix; and 2 Player, which allows two players to compete in a single, split-screen race.

Prior to races, players can tune their car, including tyre tread, amount of fuel and wing angle. As was standard for racing games of the time, weather (and its effects) are also simulated.

Williams F1 driver Jacques Villeneuve is not featured in the game. In his place is a silhouette of his body. A fictional helmet design is used and his name is simply Driver Williams, but his career statistics are correct. This character's name can be customized by the player, either to personalise their driver or to unlock extras.

== Development ==
F-1 World Grand Prix was first developed as an exclusive for the Nintendo 64 console. In order to fit the game's voice clips into the small storage capacity of Nintendo 64 cartridges, the developers employed speech compression technology developed by Factor 5.

== Reception ==
=== Video System version (1998) ===
Video System (1998)

Aggregate score
Aggregator	Score		
Aggregator	Dreamcast	GBC	N64
GameRankings	75%	N/A	78%

Review scores
Publication	Score		
Publication	Dreamcast	GBC	N64
CNET Gamecenter	7/10	N/A	8/10
Electronic Gaming Monthly	7.375/10 (Note: In Electronic Gaming Monthly's early review of the Dreamcast version, four critics gave it each a score of 8.5/10, 7/10, 7.5/10, and 6.5/10.)	N/A	7.75/10 (Note: Four critics of Electronic Gaming Monthly gave the Nintendo 64 version each a score of 8/10, 7.5/10, 8.5/10, and 7/10.)
EP Daily	N/A	N/A	9/10
Famitsu	30/40	N/A	29/40
Game Informer	7.75/10	N/A	7.5/10
GameFan	91% (Note: In GameFan's early viewpoint of the Dreamcast version, one critic gave it 89, and the other 91.)	N/A	82%
GameRevolution	A−	N/A	B−
GameSpot	7.5/10	N/A	7.9/10
GameSpy	8.5/10	N/A	N/A
IGN	8.6/10	N/A	8.3/10
Jeuxvideo.com	16/20	19/20	16/20
N64 Magazine	N/A	N/A	93%
Next Generation	3/5	N/A	N/A
Nintendo Power	N/A	N/A	7.9/10

The Nintendo 64 and Dreamcast versions received favorable reviews according to the Review aggregation website GameRankings. N64 Magazine's James Ashton said that the N64 version was "the finest driving simulation the world has ever seen". Peter Jankulovski of Hyper game the same console version 86%, calling it "a great addition to any racing fan's game library". Game Informer gave the Dreamcast version a positive review, a few months before its U.S. release date. Greg Orlando of NextGen said of the same console version in his early review as a finest title on Dreamcast, but considered as demanding for the casual gamer. In Japan, Famitsu gave it a score of 30 out of 40 for the latter console version, and 29 out of 40 for the former. Other magazines gave the Dreamcast version universal acclaim to average reviews while it was still in development.

Edge gave it eight out of ten for the N64 original, and later seven out of ten for the Dreamcast version. GamePro said of the Nintendo 64 version, "All told, you'll love WGP if you're one of the very, very few N64 gamers looking for an extremely challenging F1 sim—or if you have the enormous patience required to master it. Everyone else should give WGP a wide berth." (Note: GamePro gave the Nintendo 64 version two 3.5/5 scores for graphics and fun factor, 4.5/5 for sound, and 4/5 for control.)

The Nintendo 64 version was a success in Europe, receiving a Gold award at the 1999 Milia festival in Cannes for generating more than €20 million in the European Union during the previous year. The same N64 version was nominated for "Best Racing Game" at The Electric Playground's 1998 Blister Awards, which went to Gran Turismo.

=== Eidos Interactive version (1999) ===
Eidos Interactive (1999)

Aggregate score
Aggregator	Score	
Aggregator	PC	PS
GameRankings	73%	55%

Review scores
Publication	Score	
Publication	PC	PS
AllGame	N/A	4/5
CNET Gamecenter	7/10	N/A
Computer Games Strategy Plus	3/5	N/A
Computer Gaming World	2.5/5	N/A
EP Daily	7/10	N/A
Eurogamer	8/10	N/A
GameSpot	6.7/10	4.4/10
IGN	8.3/10	N/A
Jeuxvideo.com	18/20	7/20
PlayStation Official Magazine – UK	N/A	5/10
PC Gamer (US)	55%	N/A

The Eidos Interactive version received mixed or average reviews according to GameRankings. AllGame gave the PlayStation version four stars out of five, praising the game's extras such as a fully customizable instant replay. GamePro said of the PlayStation version, "Even if you're not a huge fan, F1 World Grand Prix offers enough options and fun gameplay to make it worth a couple of laps." (Note: GamePro gave the PlayStation version three 3.5/5 scores for graphics, control, and fun factor, and 3/5 for sound.)

== Sequel ==
Its sequel, F-1 World Grand Prix II, was published by Video System in 1999 for the Nintendo 64 and in 2000 for the Dreamcast and Game Boy Color.
