= Vroom (video game) =

1991 video game

- Developer: Lankhor
- Publishers: Lankhor; Ubi Soft (Amiga)
- Programmer: Daniel Macré
- Artist: Dominique Sablons
- Composer: André Bescond
- Platforms: Amiga, Atari ST, MS-DOS
- Release: WW: 1991
- Genre: Racing
- Modes: Single-player, multiplayer

Vroom is a 1991 racing game developed and published by Lankhor and programmed by Daniel Macré. It was first released in 1991 for the Atari ST and later for the Amiga and MS-DOS. A multiplayer version was later released along with an add-on pack containing more tracks.

== Gameplay ==
Vroom is a racing video game with a first-person perspective where the player takes on the role of a car. Players can choose one of six circuits and contains three modes; training, arcade and championship.

== Development ==
Vroom was programmed by Daniel Macré who started making video games more out of frustration because programming was not part of his responsibility anymore at work and released the first version of the game on the Sinclair QL in 1986. The game was made in six months. The game's title came from a French comic series Michel Vaillant. In 1993, Lankhor adapted the game on the Sega Genesis under FIA license under the title F1 and was published by Domark.

== Reception ==
Vroom has received positive reviews from critics praising the fast-paced and simple-yet-addictive gameplay. Amiga Computing said the fast-paced game had turned the reviewer into a "driving freak". Amiga Format wrote that the game was fast, fun, funky, and French. Meanwhile, The One For Amiga Games felt the game was both fast and fun, and an easy game to get into. Amiga Mania liked that the game was not overly complicated. Amiga Action confessed it was hard to fault the game. Amiga Power said the game was faster than F1 GP, more playable than Lotus Turbo Challenge 2, prettier than Outrun Europa, and with a sillier name than Super Hang-On. Nevertheless, the site acknowledged that the game was pitted against strong competition. Games-X wrote that the game was a great entry in an inexhaustible genre that kept getting better. On the contrary, CU Amiga felt the simple gameplay was the title's downfall. The game has won the Tilt d'or awards for sports simulation by Tilt magazine.

== Legacy ==
Vroom Multiplayer is a 1993 expansion pack of Vroom which the developers said that the expansion pack was fundamentally more beautiful than on Amiga or Atari ST. The expansion pack was completely independent of the other versions and has some new features such as multiplayer option. A single-player add-on titled Vroom Data Disk was released in 1992 for Amiga and Atari ST. The add-on adds six new circuits and the Atari ST version has joystick control option in competition mode.
