= St. George's College, Harare =

St George's College

Location
- 3 Borrowdale Road, Harare, Harare, Zimbabwe; 17.801507°S 31.058498°E

Information
- Type: Private, Catholic, day and boarding secondary education institution
- Motto: Latin: Ex Fide Fiducia; English: From Faith Comes Confidence
- Religious affiliation: Roman Catholic (Jesuit)
- Established: 1896; 130 years ago
- Founder: Fr. Marc Barthélemy, SJ
- Sister school: Dominican Convent High School
- Rector: Fr. Martin Nyadewu
- Headmaster: John Farrelly
- Gender: Male, Female (6th. Form - 2020, 1st and 2nd Form - 2026)
- Enrollment: 765 (2015)
- Campus: Suburban
- Colours: Red , White and Black
- Mascot: The Dragon
- Nickname: Saints
- Affiliations: ATS; CHISZ; HMC
- Website: stgeorges.co.zw
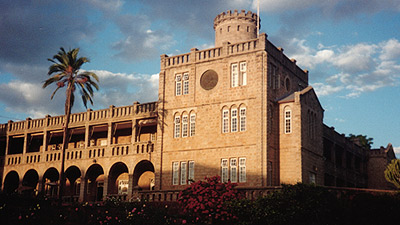

St. George's College is a private Jesuit boys (co-ed in the 6th form) high school in Harare, Zimbabwe. The school, colloquially referred to as Saints or George's, is located along Borrowdale Road, in Harare. The land was donated to the Jesuits. This led to the relocation of the school site from Bulawayo to Harare, the foundation of St. George's College. On the same site, a preparatory primary school was established, called Hartmann House (HH). This site is next to the presidents house, which acts as the official Zimbabwe State House. The school motto is Ex Fide Fiducia, a Latin phrase meaning "From Faith Comes Confidence".

In the past, St. Michael's Preparatory School (Grades 1–3) in Borrowdale would often start a pupil's journey to St. George's. Boys would attend Grades 1–3 before joining Hartmann House, where they would complete their Grades 4–7. However, at the beginning of 2017, with the introduction of Grades 1–3 at Hartmann House following its extension, the case has changed. It is, however, not a prerequisite to have studied at Hartmann House upon entering St. George's College.

St. George's College was ranked 5th out of the top 100 best high schools in Africa by Africa Almanac in 2003, based upon the calibre of education, student engagement, strength and activities of alumni, school profile, internet and news visibility. St. George's College was also ranked as one of the Top 10 High Schools in Zimbabwe in 2014.

St. George's College is a member of the Association of Trust Schools (ATS). The current Headmaster, Mr John Farrelly, is a member of the Conference of Heads of Independent Schools in Zimbabwe (CHISZ) and an international member of the Headmasters' and Headmistresses' Conference (HMC).

== History ==
St. George's College was founded in 1896 by a French Jesuit, Fr. Marc Barthélemy, SJ, who opened the doors of a small corrugated-iron, two-windowed hut to admit the first six pupils to Bulawayo Boys' School in Bulawayo, the second largest city in Zimbabwe (formerly Southern Rhodesia). In 1898, a permanent building was erected, and in December of that year, at the first prize-giving ceremony, the school assumed the title St. George's Boys' Public School.

In 1899, Fr. Francis Johanny [born François Régis Johanny April the 8th 1865 at Le Puy-en-Velay (Haute-Loire, France) died 25 June 1958 Salisbury (Zimbabwe), son of François Johanny and Rose Parier], SJ joined the staff and set up the Cadet Corps.

Entered the English Province of the Society of Jesus 7 September 1882.

He had lived since May 14, 1885 in Port Elizabeth, Cape Town. Ordained as Roman Catholic priest 19 September 1897.

In 1899 he joined St George's College in Southern Rhodesia.

His mother, Rosalie (known as Rose) Parier, was born on April 5, 1829, in Jabier (Saint-Christophe-sur-Dolaizon, Haute-Loire). She was a lacemaker and lived in Mercoeur (Saint-Privat-d'Allier, Haute-Loire) where she married François Johanny on September 16, 1857. She then settled in Puy-en-Velay with her husband where she died on July 22, 1884. Rosalie Parier was the daughter of Jean, François Parier [born April 12, 1796, in Séneujols (Haute-Loire) died March 27, 1872, in Dolaizon (Saint-Christophe-sur-Dolaizon, Haute-Loire), rector then teacher] and of Ursule Bonnet.

Three years later, Fr. Thomas Gardner, SJ, the first English Jesuit arrived. In the same year, in 1902, the first Rhodes' Scholarships were awarded in Southern Rhodesia, and they went to the St. George's scholars: Albert Bisset and Woodford Gilbert. In 1912, the first permanent buildings were completed and opened by Earl Grey.

St. George's College moved to Salisbury (now Harare) in 1926. The architect of the buildings was Fr. Louis Lebœuf, SJ; the main builder was Br. John Conway, SJ. The Beit Hall was established in 1935 by Sir Robert Stanley. In 1940, the Fr. Crehan Library was built, then the Monastery, and later, the Priory. In 1955, the new Dormitory Wing and Laboratories were built, and in 1973 the permanent Chapel was erected.

In the years before Zimbabwe's independence in 1980, the then Southern Rhodesia's government schools were segregated; St. George's College, being a private school, was allowed a limited black intake and was multiracial. It had admitted its first black pupil in 1963.

== Academics ==
St. George's College is a selective school: an entrance examination must be taken to enter Form One, even by students from Hartmann House. 'A' grades at Ordinary (O) level are requisite to enter the Lower Sixth Form, with those already at the college not exempt from this requirement. The study of religious education is obligatory throughout the first four years.

St. George's College follows the Cambridge International Examinations (CIE) syllabus at IGCSE, AS, and A level.

== The house system ==
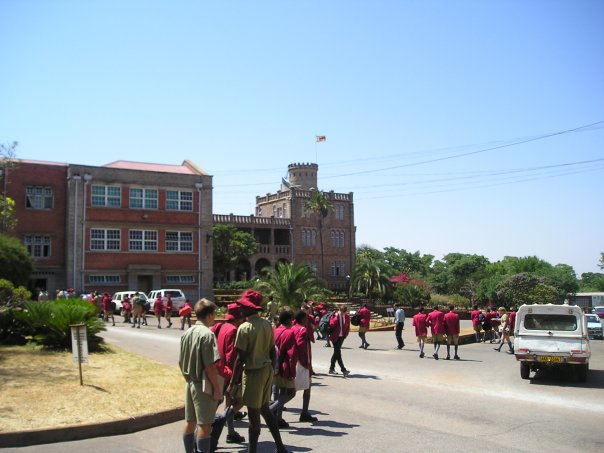
St George's College boys during break-time, in school uniform

The school has a family-oriented approach to academic and extracurricular studies; every student belonging to his own house. There are four houses, identified by colour, and named after the prominent Jesuits who were amongst the founding fathers of the school in Bulawayo:

- Fr. Marc Barthélemy, SJ: first Rector (French, 1896–1913), Dark Green Vests.
- Fr. Thomas Gardner, SJ: first English Jesuit, an anthropologist and a champion of the Cadets, Red Vests.
- Fr. Andrew Hartmann, SJ: chaplain to The Pioneer Column in 1890, Dark Blue Vests.
- Fr. Francis Johanny, SJ: second Rector in 1914, Yellow Vests.

The house system commenced in 1938 with only three houses: Barthélemy, Gardner, and Hartmann. Johanny was created in 1983, as the number of students gradually increased. Each scholar, referred to as a Saint's boy, inherits the house of his previous relative (predecessor); 'new' boys are allocated their houses on a random basis.

== The Grant of Arms ==
The Grant of Arms was fashioned by the College of Arms on 19 October 1931, and aimed to recognise three outstanding characteristics:

- The first denoted the foundation and management of the college by the Jesuits, signified by the inclusion of two black wolves and the cauldron, as taken from the family arms of Saint Ignatius of Loyola the founder of the Society of Jesus (Jesuit Fathers); in the Basque language "loy-" means wolf and "-olla" means cauldron.
- The second characteristic – that of the location of the college in the then Rhodesia and a play on the Greek word "Rhoden", meaning rose – is symbolised by an attractive flower that exists in various forms, colours, and fragrances. It is hardy and can flourish almost anywhere precisely because it is a hybrid of so many varieties (these should be the qualities of a St. George's boy, in particular: "A Man For and With Others").
- The third characteristic is the dedication to Saint George, the college's patron Saint, as depicted by the inclusion of the red cross from his banner, and the hilt of the sword facing upwards. This symbolises the Saint's victorious triumph, and incidentally that of Christianity over the powers of evil (as represented by the dragon's wings) and our redemption through the death of Jesus Christ.

The motto on the scroll, Ex Fide Fiducia, means "From Faith Comes Confidence".

== Alumni ==
In 1921, the Old Georgian's Association was formed; its first president was Mr. D. Blackbeard. St. George's College Alumni, known as Old Georgians (OGs), include Rhodes' Scholars who attended Oxford University, Cambridge University, and Ivy League universities. Alumni who "donned the Red Blazer", achieving the arduous task of attending St. Michael's, Hartmann House, and St. George's College, are known as Old Michaelians or Reds.

=== Notable alumni ===
- Sir Bruce Keogh, KBE, FRCS, FRCP, professor, surgeon, physician, medical director of NHS England
- Edward Acton, Vice-Chancellor of the University of East Anglia
- Richie Boucher, former CEO of Bank of Ireland
- Alex Callinicos, political theorist
- Simukai Chigudu, Associate Professor of African Politics at the University of Oxford
- Colin de Grandhomme, Zimbabwe-born New Zealand cricketer
- Brian Dzingai, 200 m Beijing Olympic 2008 finalist
- Grant Flower, Zimbabwe Test cricketer
- Travis Friend, Zimbabwe Test cricketer
- Peter Godwin, writer
- Trevor Gripper, Zimbabwe Test cricketer
- Timothy Jones, professional road racing cyclist
- Togara Muzanenhamo, poet
- Tendai Nguni, a Zimbabwean rapper by the name Tehn Diamond
- Prof Brian Raftopoulos, academic and political commentator/analyst
- Gavin Rennie, Zimbabwe Test cricketer
- John Rennie, Zimbabwe Test cricketer, brother of Gavin
- Farai Sevenzo, writer/filmmaker
- Evan Stewart, world champion diver
- Matthew Rusike, Zimbabwe national football team midfielder
- Genius Chidzikwe, Former Professional Zimbabwean ATP Tennis Player, NCAA DI College Champion, Davis Cup Zimbabwean Representative
- James Fraser-Mackenzie, Olympic rower
- Godfrey Lawrence, South African Test cricketer
- Sam Curran, English cricketer
- Tom Curran, English cricketer
- Peter Purcell-Gilpin, Olympic rower
- Bharat Patel, Justice of the Supreme Court of Zimbabwe

== See also ==
- Hartmann House Preparatory School
- List of schools in Zimbabwe
- List of boarding schools
- Arundel School
- List of Jesuit sites

== Notes ==
saints genius
