= Warm Up! =

2000 video game

Warm Up
- Original French cover art
- Developer: Lankhor
- Publisher: Microids
- Designer: Daniel Macré; Jean-Luc Langlois
- Platforms: PlayStation, Windows
- Release: 2000
- Genre: Racing simulator
- Modes: Single-player, multiplayer

Warm Up! is a 2000 single-player racing simulator developed by Lankhor and published by Microids for PlayStation and Windows.

== Gameplay ==
Warm Up! is essentially a Formula 1 game without the official license, consisting of both a simulation mode and an arcade mode.

== Critical reception ==
JeuxVideo praised the game's realism and addictive gameplay.
