= Official Formula One Racing =

1999 video game

Official Formula 1 Racing
- Developer: Lankhor
- Publisher: Video System
- Platform: Microsoft Windows
- Release: NA: June 27, 1999; EU: 1999
- Genre: Racing
- Modes: Single-player, multiplayer

Official Formula 1 Racing is a racing game developed by Lankhor, published by Video System and distributed by Eidos Interactive in 1999. A sequel to the game, called F1 World Grand Prix (the 1999 version), was released in 1999–2000.

== Reception ==
Reception

Aggregate score
Aggregator	Score
GameRankings	67%

Review scores
Publication	Score
AllGame	4/5
CNET Gamecenter	4/10
Computer Games Strategy Plus	4/5
Computer Gaming World	3.5/5
Edge	6/10
GamePro	4/5
GameSpot	6.8/10
IGN	5/10
Jeuxvideo.com	18/20
Next Generation	2/5
PC Accelerator	4/10
PC Gamer (US)	69%

The game received average reviews according to the review aggregation website GameRankings. GameSpot said that Official Formula 1 Racing achieved a success either as an arcade racer or as a serious simulation. CNET Gamecenter gave it an unfavorable review almost a month before its release date. Adam Pavlacka of NextGen gave the positive review, but considered the title as not groundbreaking or exciting.
