= Ian Robertson (rugby union, born 1950) =

South African rugby union footballer

- Born: Ian William Robertson; 28 April 1950 Salisbury, Rhodesia
- Died: 24 August 2015 (aged 65) Durban, South Africa
- Height: 1.82 m (6 ft 0 in)
- Weight: 82 kg (181 lb)
- School: Prince Edward School, Harare

Rugby union career
Amateur team(s)
Years	Team	Apps	(Points)
- Old Hararians
- Villagers RFC
- Pretoria Harlequins
Provincial / State sides
Years	Team	Apps	(Points)
1969–79	Rhodesia	56	(437)
1975	Western Province		
1985	Northern Transvaal	3	(9)
International career
Years	Team	Apps	(Points)
1974–1976	South Africa	5	(3)

Ian William Robertson (28 April 1950 – 24 August 2015) was a South African rugby union player.

== Playing career ==
Robertson attended the Prince Edward School in Salisbury (now Harare) and in 1968 represented Rhodesia at the annual Craven Week tournament for schoolboys. The following year, as a nineteen year old, he made his debut in senior rugby for Rhodesia against South West Africa. Robertson went on to represent Rhodesia regularly from 1969 until 1979, but for two excursions in South Africa. First in 1972 when he moved to Johannesburg and only managed to make the Transvaal B team. In 1975 he moved to Cape Town and joined the Villager Football Club. He however could not secure a regular place in the Western Province team. When Robertson returned to Rhodesia at the beginning of 1976, he once again became an automatic first choice for the national side and was 1976 probably his greatest year.

At an international level, Robertson was selected to tour with the Springboks to France in 1974 and made his test debut against France on 23 November 1974 in Toulouse. He played in both test matches on the French tour and also played in five tour matches, scoring eighteen points for the Springboks. He missed out on any further tests during 1975 and in 1976 he played in three of the four test matches against the touring All Black side captained by Andy Leslie.

Robertson's career was halted against Transvaal at Salisbury in 1979 when he suffered a badly broken wrist and ultimately retired from rugby. In 1985, he tried a comeback with Northern Transvaal, but only played in three provincial matches.

=== Test history ===
No.	Opposition	Result (SA 1st)	Position	Points	Date	Venue
1.	France	13–4	Centre		23 November 1974	Stade Municipal, Toulouse
2.	France	10–8	Centre		30 November 1974	Parc des Princes, Paris
3.	New Zealand	16–7	Fullback	3 (1 dropgoal)	24 July 1976	Kings Park Stadium, Durban
4.	New Zealand	9–15	Centre		14 August 1976	Free State Stadium, Bloemfontein
5.	New Zealand	15–14	Fullback		18 September 1976	Ellis Park Stadium, Johannesburg

== Accolades ==
Robertson was named Rhodesia's Sportsman of the Year in 1976.

== See also ==
- List of South Africa national rugby union players – Springbok no. 480
