= Ski Park Manager =

2002 video game

- Developer(s): Lankhor
- Publisher(s): Microïds
- Platform(s): Windows PC
- Release: 2002

Ski Park Manager is a video game released in 2002, developed by Lankhor and published by Microïds.

== Description ==
The game has 42 challenges and three levels of difficulty. The game has a career mode, where the players can buy and sell ski resorts, to acquire the most popular ones. There is a training module, to learn the techniques of the game. There is a large variety of scenarios, including bankruptcy, school holidays, snowstorms, accidents, avalanches and low snowfall.

To entertain holiday makers, the game has a large number of possible activities. Some of these are downhill and cross-country skiing, sledding, walking and shopping. The players must construct own infrastructure including chalets, hotels, apartments, facilities, shops, restaurants and bars. The landscape can be modified, for example by deforesting. The game also allows players to develop and research new buildings in the Ski Lab plus building.

== Reception ==
GameSpot called the game "enjoyable and challenging", but criticized its "unintuitive interface, questionable design decisions, compatibility issues, and an overall lack of polish".
