= Outzone =

1991 video game

- Developer(s): Lankhor
- Publisher(s): Lankhor
- Designer(s): Stéphane Belin
- Platform(s): Atari ST, Amiga, Commodore 64
- Release: 1991
- Genre(s): Action, strategy
- Mode(s): Single-player

Outzone is an action strategy game developed and published by Lankhor and was released in 1991 for the Atari ST, Amiga and Commodore 64.

== Gameplay ==
Screenshot of the player protect the smaller spacecraft.

Outzone is a arcade shoot 'em up game which the game set in a futuristic setting. The player controls a spacecraft whose role is to escort and protect a smaller one which they move at a constant speed right in front of the player's craft which must destroy or avoid obstacles. The game had 28 levels which are escort mission. The player which had to break blocks to protect the smaller spacecraft from getting hit.

A second screenshot of the player protect the smaller spacecraft

== Reception ==
Reception

Review scores
Publication	Score
Aktueller Software Markt	Amiga: 10.2/12; ST: 8.8/12
Génération 4	75/100
ST Format	66/100
Amiga Joker	69/100
Power Play	Amiga: 68/100; ST: 67/100
