= Kawasaki Superbike Challenge =

1995 video game

Kawasaki Superbike Challenge Kawasaki Superbikes
- European Mega Drive cover art
- Developers: Lankhor; Teque London (Game Gear)
- Publishers: Domark (Eidos Interactive); Time Warner Interactive (U.S.A.)
- Designer: Chris Johnson
- Programmer: Christian Droin; Jean-Luc Langlois
- Platforms: Sega Genesis, Super NES, Game Gear
- Release: Mega Drive/Genesis: NA: March 1995; EU: March 17, 1995; Super NES: NA: December 1995; EU: 1995; Game Gear: NA: 1995; EU: 1995
- Genre: Racing
- Mode: Single-player

Kawasaki Superbike Challenge (known in Europe as Kawasaki Superbikes) is a multiplatform racing video game where the player takes the role of a Kawasaki factory team rider in an unnamed fictional racing series.

== Gameplay ==
Kawasaki Superbike Challenge is a motorcycle racing game that uses the same engine as the Sega Genesis game F1. It includes 14 standard-length race tracks, plus the Suzuka 8 Hours endurance race, available in both training and Championship modes. The game is unlicensed (except by Kawasaki), so all riders and teams are fictional.

The game has more polygonal roadside objects than F1, and there is still a Turbo mode, allowing for faster racing at the expense of some of the detail. Players are given the ability to turn on or off weather (during rainy days the graphics are darker and the bike has less traction). The number of laps on each course can be 5, 10 or 15, and there are four skill levels. Some changes have been made to how the vehicle handles, to emphasize the switch from cars to bikes.

== Reception ==
Reviewing the Genesis version, GamePro praised the numerous options, responsive controls, complex tracks, and balanced challenge with "enough variety to suit all skill levels", but criticized the undetailed landscapes, "blocky" polygons, and lack of visual effects to accentuate the action. They more wholeheartedly approved of the Game Gear version, applauding the graphics, fast pace, two-player mode, and most particularly the numerous modes and customization options, and concluding that "Handheld racing doesn't get much better than this."

A critic for Next Generation panned the Super NES version, chiefly for the lack of any sense of speed. He further remarked that "Flat-shaded 'polygon' blocks dot the sides of the road, which only serves to confuse rather than decorate, the 'first-person' perspective rather effectively hides the road, and you could even describe the control as sluggish, except that sluggish isn't strong enough a word." He gave it one out of five stars.

Next Generation also reviewed the Genesis version of the game, rating it two stars out of five, and stated that "eventually the redundant, mundane races and lack of character traits in bikers make this game uninteresting."
