= Elemental (video game) =

1988 video game

- Publisher: Lankhor
- Designer: Erick Dupuis
- Writer: Erick Dupuis
- Composer: Jean-Luc Langlois
- Platform: Atari ST
- Release: 1988
- Genres: Action, strategy
- Modes: Single-player, multiplayer

Elemental is an action-strategy video game written and designed by Erick Dupuis and published by Lankhor. The game was released in 1988 for the Atari ST.

== Gameplay ==
Gameplay screenshot

The player controls a green ball which freely evolves on the stage and was pursued by two other balls. The first one was invincible and the player can only evade it using the environment to put some distance between them or by staying on one of the four "safe point" of the stage. The other follows the same rules but it can also be stuck in holes present in the stage while following the green ball, another one will appear and continue following the player.

Every of the 32 levels plays out on a non-scrolling field where the player has to evade two enemies and touch certain tiles. If an enemy touches an object, it transforms into a pill which also has to be picked up and dropped elsewhere. There are save tiles where the enemies can't touch the player.
