= Barry May =

English cricketer (born 1944)

Personal information
- Full name: Barry May
- Born: 1 November 1944; Johannesburg, Transvaal, South Africa
- Batting: Right-handed
- Role: Batsman

Domestic team information
- Years: Team
- 1970–1972: Oxford University

Career statistics
Competition	First-class
Matches	22
Runs scored	703
Batting average	18.02
100s/50s	1/2
Top score	103
Catches/stumpings	12/-
- Source: Cricinfo, 8 November 2022

Barry May (born 1 November 1944) is a South African-born former English cricketer who played first-class cricket for Oxford University in the early 1970s. He was born in Johannesburg and attended Prince Edward School in Salisbury, Rhodesia.

May's only first-class century was the 103 he hit against Glamorgan in June 1970.

With a degree in electronic engineering from the University of Cape Town, May first moved to the UK as a Rhodes Scholar and studied for a master's degree at Brasenose College, University of Oxford. During his time at Oxford he also won an Oxford blue for field hockey.
