= Hillside, Harare =

Hillside is a residential area in southeast Harare, Zimbabwe. The estimate terrain elevation above sea level is 1506 metres. Often compared to nearby, Arcadia and Braesaide, it is a historically working class, Coloured (mixed race) area located just southeast of the CBD and the Harare-Bulawayo railway.

== Etymology ==
Hillside reportedly takes its name from the suburbs relatively high elevation, over a mile above sea level. Another theory is that the area was named after the Harare kopje, which was the city's original commercial district and hub for mixed race communities before the First World War. After the war many coloured and Asian residents were resettled in south of the main railway forming a west to east band from Belvedere to Braeside.

== History ==
Hillside retained its rural character until the 1930s, when it was designated a mixed race area. The main changes were the growth of industry in the south of the city as well as the need for housing for the Coloured community.

Further improvements to railway communications brought more residential development and post war years saw a number of residential areas in their own grounds being built in the east of the suburbs. Housing is generally denser and more affordable than areas to the north. Eastridge Primary School, serves the area, with Hillside Park being the main park and community hub within Hillside.

== Demography ==
The 2012 census counted a population of 8,210 in the suburb. Ethnicity-wise, 61.4% of the population were Coloured, 37% Black, and 1.7% were Asian. Hillside has long been home to a large Coloured community, and the most spoken language was English, followed by Shona, a rarity in southern Harare. Of the 3,480 households, the number of homes owned or privately rented were the majority, with rented properties a bit less but still significant.

== See also ==
- Coloured Zimbabweans
- Cape Coloured
- Arcadia
