= Sdaw =

1990 video game

- Developer(s): Fabrice Caillaud; Lionel Caillaud; Arnaud Dewilde
- Publisher(s): Lankhor
- Platform(s): Amstrad CPC
- Release: 1990
- Genre(s): Action-adventure game
- Mode(s): Single-player

Sdaw is a 1990 action game developed by Fabrice Caillaud, Lionel Caillaud and Arnaud Dewilde, and published by Lankhor for the Amstrad CPC.

== Plot ==
In the aftermath of a global disaster (World War III), the world is left in ruins, with most humans transformed into mutants. A handful of survivors engineered a sophisticated robot known as S.D.A.W. (System de Defense Anti-Wobblegobblegobbledegook). Players assume control of S.D.A.W and operate from sewers, tasked with the mission of eliminating unwanted occupants by restraining and dismantling them.

== Development ==
Sdaw has a 16 colour palette and the game world's labyrinth has around 200 screens. its use of "mode 0" allowed for graphics that were very difficult to find at the time.

== Reception ==
Sdaw received an 82% from Amstrad 100%, 60% from Joystick, and Tilt gave it a B.

MicroNews felt that a bit of extra care to the design, for instance in its animations, would have livened up the game.
