= Mortville Manor =

1987 video game

- Developer: Lankhor
- Publisher: Lankhor
- Director: Bruno Gourier
- Designer: Bernard Grelaud
- Artists: Dominique Sablons; Maria-Dolores
- Writers: Bernard Grelaud; Bruno Gourier
- Composers: Beatrice Langlois; Jean-Luc Langlois
- Platforms: Amiga, Atari ST, Amstrad CPC, Sinclair QL, MS-DOS
- Release: 1987; MS-DOS; 1988
- Genre: Adventure game
- Mode: Single-player

Mortville Manor (French: Le Manoir de Mortevielle) is a point-and-click adventure game developed and published by Lankhor released in 1987 for Atari ST. The game was ported to the Amstrad CPC, Amiga and Sinclair QL. An MS-DOS version was released in 1988 adapted by Clement Roques. Mortville Manor was the first game with speech synthesis and sold 10,000 copies around Europe. Mortville Manor was followed by its sequel Maupiti Island.

== Plot ==
The game takes place in France in the 1950s. The plot begins in the office of Jérôme Lange, a famous private detective, who receives a letter from his childhood friend Julia Defranck, in which she writes that she is ill and asks him to investigate strange events at Mortville Manor. Upon arrival, Jérôme is informed of Julia's death with a storm approaching, and begins his search around the manor.

== Gameplay ==
The player can select Jérôme's next action using the drop-down menus (Atari ST screenshot).

Mortville Manor is a first-person adventure game with a point-and-click interface. The player takes on the role of Jérôme Lange, observing the world though first-person perspective. The player can move around Mortevielle's mansion by using the toolbar at the top of the screen and giving the hero commands from the drop-down lists. The player also has the opportunity to interrogate individual residents of the Mortevielle estate, who move freely around the game.

== Development ==
The first version of Mortville Manor was released for the Sinclair QL and was developed by two employees of the Kyilkhor studio who operated with the Pyramide publishing house Bruno Gourier and Bernard Grelaud. Gourier and Grelaud teamed up with siblings Béatrice and Jean-Luc Langlois and started their own company Lankhor. With its technical qualities and attractive price, the Atari ST was gaining momentum in France and the company decides to develop for this machine as a priority. Mortville Manor was released for the Atari ST in 1987. The Langlois siblings developed a speech synthesizer that read other characters speeches. Dominique Sablons responded with a complete redesign of the Amiga and MS-DOS graphics.

== Reception and legacy ==
Reception

Review scores
Publication	Score
Computer and Video Games	7/10
ACE	745
Jeux & Stratégie	47

Award
Publication	Award
TILT	Gold Award

In France, Mortville Manor was a great artistic success. The magazine Tilt gave the game two Tilt d'Or awards for the best adventure game of the year and for the sound design. Tilt reviewer Mathieu Brisou found the game to be a "superbly crafted" game based on a "classic yet enjoyable" script. The magazine Génération 4 wrote that the game was "one of the best adventure games in French available on the Atari ST". The game was also considered one of the greatest video games ever made for the Amiga. Eric See-To for New Straits Times wrote that the game was a "fairly absorbing adventure", calling it unique, while criticizing the graphics and stating it was difficult to hear the digitised speech.

In 2015, an amateur theater company known as Théâtre de l'Embellie in Montauban paid a tribute to the game through the show Les Secrets du manoir de Mortevielle and the play the game in 2021.
