= F1 (video game) =

1993 video game

F1 / Formula One
- Developers: Lankhor; Teque London (GG, MS)
- Publisher: Domark
- Programmer: Christian Droin; Jean-Luc Langlois
- Platforms: IBM PC, Atari ST, Mega Drive/Genesis, Master System, Game Gear, Amiga
- Release: Amiga: EU: 1993; Master System: EU: October 1993; Mega Drive/Genesis: EU: November 5, 1993; NA: November 1993
- Genre: Racing
- Modes: Single-player, multiplayer

F1 (released as Formula One in the USA) is a 1993 racing video game published by Domark, based on Vroom, a game developed in 1991 for the Atari ST by French company Lankhor. It was released for the IBM PC, Mega Drive/Genesis, Master System, Game Gear, and Amiga.

It spawned a sequel in 1994 titled F1: World Championship Edition, and the game engine was reused in Kawasaki Superbike Challenge. It was one of the most popular racing games for the Mega Drive/Genesis, mostly thanks to the smooth and fast game engine.

There are no major differences between the European and North American Sega versions, except naming (the European version is simply named F1), and the lack of a battery save feature in the American version.

== Gameplay ==
The game is fully licensed by the FIA and Fuji Television, which means all drivers, teams and tracks are fully licensed. The player drives in the fictional Domark team with James Tripp (a programmer within Domark and producer of the game billed as Jim Tripp), facing drivers such as Riccardo Patrese and Michael Schumacher (Benetton), Jean Alesi and Gerhard Berger (Ferrari), Mark Blundell and Martin Brundle (Ligier), Johnny Herbert and Alessandro Zanardi (Lotus), Michael Andretti and Mika Häkkinen (McLaren), Andrea de Cesaris and Ukyo Katayama (Tyrrell) and finally Damon Hill and Alain Prost (Williams). Ayrton Senna (then in McLaren) is absent due to his endorsement to Sega's Ayrton Senna's Super Monaco GP II.

There are 12 tracks: Interlagos, Imola, Barcelona, Monte Carlo, Montreal, Castelet, Silverstone, Hockenheim, Spa, Monza, Estoril and Adelaide. Compared to the real 1993 season, several tracks are missing, such as Kyalami, Donington Park, Magny-Cours (replaced by Castelet), Hungaroring and Suzuka, but the order of the races is correct. While the track layouts are correct as of 1993, due to the impossibility of actually replicate the physics behind a Formula One car all tracks are filled with obstacles close to the track, such as signs, adboards or platforms above the track to increase the difficulty level, and are 7 laps long.

The player can train on a given track, play an arcade mode (where points are given for overtaking and running, and subtracted for being overtaken) or the whole championship, that can be composed by any number of tracks, from just one to the complete twelve. There are four difficulty levels (Novice, Amateur, Professional and Expert), each one of each increases not only the player and competitors' speed, but also decreases the damage tolerance of the car. In addition to a 2 player split-screen mode, a "turbo" mode allowed to increase the sense of speed by reducing sprites and polygons (making them roughly the same size as in split screen) and running the game at a higher speed.

Before and after the race the player is able to set up tyre hardness, wing angle and the transmission, and can be forced to quit if the player fails to make a pitstop to replace worn out tyres, or simply overheats the engine by rapid downshifting at high speed, (over-revving is possible with automatic gears by knocking on other cars tyres, making the player car jump, causing a drastic increase in the RPM) noticeable by a loud squealing noise. On the Silverstone track there appears to be two 'retired' cars, one by the pits and one halfway round.

== Release and promotion ==
In Spain, Domark announced a promotional campaign for F1 in September 1993, involving a travelling competition at shopping centres in which players would compete to record the fastest times. The campaign was intended to promote the game's forthcoming releases for Sega consoles.

== Reception ==
Reception

Review score
Publication	Score
Game Informer	SMD: 8.25/10

CU Amiga gave the Amiga version of F1 an 84 percent rating and called it "a superb two-player game, but pales a little when going solo". Computer Gaming World in August 1994 rated the game 2.5 stars out of five, praising its speed but criticizing its realism, handling, and features like slipstreaming. Mega placed the game at #17 in their Top Mega Drive Games of All Time. In 2017, Gamesradar ranked the game 17th on its "Best Sega Genesis/Mega Drive games of all time".
