= John Rennie (cricketer) =

Zimbabwean cricketer

Personal information
- Full name: John Alexander Rennie
- Born: 29 July 1970 (age 56); Fort Victoria, Rhodesia (now Masvingo, Zimbabwe)
- Batting: Right-handed
- Bowling: Right-arm medium-fast
- Role: Bowler
- Relatives: Gavin Rennie (brother)

International information
- National side: Zimbabwe (1993–2000)
- Test debut: 1 December 1993 v Pakistan
- Last Test: 18 September 1997 v New Zealand
- ODI debut: 10 November 1993 v South Africa
- Last ODI: 16 July 2000 v West Indies

Domestic team information
- Years: Team
- 1993/94–2000/01: Matabeleland

Career statistics
Competition	Test	ODI	FC	LA
Matches	4	44	40	66
Runs scored	62	201	1,045	389
Batting average	12.40	13.40	21.77	13.89
100s/50s	0/0	0/0	0/6	0/0
Top score	22	27	67*	33
Balls bowled	724	1,965	6,463	2,908
Wickets	3	34	96	52
Bowling average	97.66	46.00	33.12	44.15
5 wickets in innings	0	0	6	0
10 wickets in match	0	0	0	0
Best bowling	2/22	3/27	9/76	3/27
Catches/stumpings	1/–	12/–	10/–	21/–
- Source: CricInfo, 9 August 2019

John Alexander Rennie (born 29 July 1970) is a former Zimbabwean cricketer who played in four Test matches and 44 One Day Internationals (ODIs) from 1993 to 2000. He played as a swing bowler for the Zimbabwe national team between 1993 and 2000.

== Early life ==
Rennie was born at Fort Victoria in what was then Rhodesia in 1970 and was educated in Salisbury. He attended Hartmann House Preparatory School and then St George's College where he was coached by Robin Stokes and Bill Flower. After playing in the school XI, he joined Old Georgians Cricket Club and played for Zimbabwean representative teams, including the national under-24 team.

== Cricket career ==
A swing bowler who was able to move the ball in the air and bowl in a controlled way, Rennie made his international debut in 1993, playing in all four of Zimbabwe's matches in the 1993 Hero Cup series of ODIs in India, including in the tied match against India when he was the not out batsman as Zimbabwe almost won the match. He made his Test debut later the same year during Zimbabwe's tour of Pakistan, taking the wicket of Shoaib Mohammad on debut. He went on to play for Zimbabwe mainly in one-day cricket, making 44 ODI appearances and playing in only four Test matches before his international career ended in 2000. The well known cricket writer John Ward believed that Rennies success was achieved largely through his hard work and considerable application rather than mere natural talent.

In domestic cricket, Rennie played for Matabeleland in the Logan Cup between 1993/94 and 2000/01, bowling his team to success in the 1995/96 cup final. He captained the team in several matches during 1996/97 but his career in the storage industry and family commitments cut his cricket career short and Rennie played his final senior matches in 2000/01. He served on the national selection panel for a period, but was removed following Zimbabwe's disappointing performances in the 2011 Cricket World Cup.

== Family ==
Rennie's younger brother, Gavin, also played for Zimbabwe, the pair playing in the same Test team in 1997, John Rennie's final Test match. This was the first time that three sets of brothers had played for the same team in the same Test match, the Rennie brothers playing alongside Grant and Andy Flower and Paul and Bryan Strang.
