= La Secte Noire =

1990 video game

- Publisher: Lankhor
- Designer: Jean-Claude Lebon; Jean-Pierre Godey
- Platform: Amstrad CPC
- Release: 1990 (Amstrad CPC); Amiga ST (1993); PC (1993)
- Genre: Adventure

La Secte Noire is a 1990 adventure game developed by Lankhor. It was developed by Jean-Pierre Godey and Jean-Claude Lebon, who later went on to develop Mokowe.

== Overview ==
The game is set in a Medieval village of Issegeac in Périgord that has long been protected by a mysterious grimoire. After the village leader is killed and the grimoire is stolen by a cult, a curse falls upon the village. The player plays as the grandson of the dead leader and must track down the cult to retrieve the grimoire.

The game includes control over time of day, which determines clues and other environmental phenomena. Many of its mechanics were reused in the game Mokowe.

== Reception ==
Amstar gave the game a positive review, praising its graphics and story while noting that it did not innovate on the adventure game genre. Olivier Hautefeullle of Tilt gave the game a positive review, praising its high-quality graphics, the robust vocabulary of its syntax analyzer, and its atmosphere.

Joystick gave the game a score of 67%, praising its graphics and story but noting that it relied on classic game mechanics.

The game was noted for its high difficulty. An article from Amstrad Cent Pour Cent#31 called it the "game that no one in the editorial office could finish".

== Sequels and remakes ==
A sequel, La Crypte Des Maudits, was released in 1991. A remake of La Secte Noire titled The Black Sect was released in 1993 for the Amiga and PC.
