= Sam Levy =

Zimbabwean businessman and property developer

Sam Levy

Sam Levy (9 October 1929 – 5 June 2012) was a Zimbabwean businessman and property developer best known for his construction of the Sam Levy's Village shopping mall in Borrowdale, a suburb of Harare. A self-made billionaire, he was one of the richest people in Zimbabwe at the time of his death.

== Early life ==
Levy was born to a Jewish family in Que Que (Kwekwe) on 9 October 1929. He attended the Prince Edward School in Salisbury (now Harare).

== Business ventures ==
In the 1960s, Levy founded and chaired Macey's Stores Limited, a large supermarket group; the chain's success was largely driven by undercutting its competitors, earning Levy the nickname of "The Cut-Price King."

His first shopping centre had its origins in a September 1973 deal that saw Levy purchase Duly's car showroom on Harare's Angwa Street for US$1.5 million, reportedly making it Zimbabwe's most expensive property sale at the time. Redesigned in the style of an American shopping mall, the centre's amenities included a Macey's supermarket, a butcher shop, and a bakery. Eventually renamed Ximex Mall, the property was sold to Zimbabwe's National Social Security Authority (NSSA) in 2010.

Levy's namesake shopping mall broke ground in the 1990s. Its offerings now include a wide array of stores, multiple dining establishments, a cinema, an arcade, and a bowling alley opening onto outdoor walkways named for Levy's wife and children. The architecture of the mall evokes English designs, including storefronts styled after country cottages and a clock tower reminiscent of Big Ben. Security guard uniforms were also formerly modeled on those of British police officers, though these uniforms have since been retired.

Upon his death, Levy's son Isaacs took over the family business. Levy was posthumously honoured with a Lifetime Achievement Award at the Victor Night Awards and recognised by the UN's EMPRETEC programme as one of the most influential entrepreneurs in post-independence Zimbabwe.

== Political career ==
Levy successfully stood in the Salisbury council elections in 1975, being elected councillor for Ward 8 (the Harare suburb of Waterfalls). He served as councillor until 1979.

== Controversies ==
According to a 2014 retrospective in The Herald, Levy was rumored to have built Sam Levy's Village without the approval of the municipal government, only bringing the buildings up to code when the centre was threatened with demolition. The retrospective also notes that Levy's England-inspired design for the shopping mall (including the former security guard uniforms) could appear to clash with Zimbabwean decolonization, and that the mall's clientele still skewed predominantly white as of the time of the article's publication.

In 2000, 50 motorcycles marked "police" were discovered at Levy's farm near Harare. He was fined Z$200.

== Personal life and death ==
In his youth, Levy was a competitive marksman, representing Northern Rhodesia in shooting competitions and placing in those tournaments.

Levy's interest in agriculture led him to acquire a fruit farm in Nyanga and a livestock farm near Lake Chivero, where he introduced American Beefmaster cattle to Zimbabwe and bred them for competitions. In 1980, Levy's cattle won all top prizes in Zimbabwe's National Carcass Competition.

With his wife, Gloria, Levy had four children: Julia, Isaacs, Maurice, and Raymond.

A private man who was shy in public settings, Levy was, according to a family eulogy published on the mall's website, humble, hardworking, "principled," "tough, but... fair" and a devoted family man. He was given (or gave himself) the Shona nickname "kanyuchi" ("bee"), referring either to his industriousness in making money or to his behavior towards others – rewarding them with "honey" for honesty and fairness and "stinging" them for dishonesty or wrongdoing.

Levy was reportedly fiercely loyal to his country, regarded as a patriot by Zimbabweans of all backgrounds. He was on good terms with many of Zimbabwe's political elite, including Joice Mujuru, former Vice-President of Zimbabwe, and her husband, General Solomon Mujuru. After a helicopter crash that broke several of General Mujuru's vertebrae, Levy connected the Mujurus with South African medical experts and financed some of the general's medical treatment.

A noted philanthropist, Levy had a record of charitable work including contributions to the Miss Zimbabwe Trust and Child Survival Trust, run by friend Kiki Divaris. According to his driver, Levy would also provide food and finance education for people in need.

After a three-year battle with head and neck cancer, Levy died at his home in the Harare suburb of Avondale on 5 June 2012. He was survived by his wife and children, along with seven grandchildren.

Levy is buried at Warren Hills Jewish Cemetery in Harare.
