= Prince Edward School =

- Prince Edward School Badge

Location
- Harare; Zimbabwe; 17.8205°S 31.0350°E

Information
- Type: State school, boarding and day school
- Motto: Tot Facienda Parum Factum (Latin: So much to do, So little done)
- Established: 13 June 1898
- Headmaster: Dr. Aggrippa G. Sora
- Gender: Boys
- Age: 13 to 19
- Enrollment: 1200+
- Education system: Zimbabwean
- Houses: Odzi; Shashi; Tokwe; Sebakwe; Runde; Save; Limpopo; Zambezi
- Colours: Maroon, green and white
- Mascot: Tiger
- Nickname: PES
- Rival: St George's College, Harare
- Newspaper: The Hararian
- Alumni: Old Hararians
- Postal address: P.O. Box CY418, Causeway; Harare; Zimbabwe
- Badges: The Three Feathers
- Website: www.peschool.co.zw

Prince Edward School (or Prince Edward, commonly referred to as PE) is a public, boarding and day school for boys aged 13 to 19 in Harare, Zimbabwe. It provides education facilities to 1200+ boys in Forms I to VI. The school is served by a graduate staff of over 100 teachers.

Prince Edward School was ranked 6th out of the top 100 best high schools in Africa by Africa Almanac in 2003, based upon quality of education, student engagement, strength and activities of alumni, school profile, internet and news visibility. Prince Edward School was also ranked as one of the Top 10 High Schools in Zimbabwe in 2014.

== History ==
Prince Edward was established in 1898 in Salisbury, Southern Rhodesia (now Harare, Zimbabwe), as Salisbury Grammar. It was renamed Salisbury High School in 1906 and adopted its current name in 1925 when visited by Edward, Prince of Wales. It is the second oldest boys' school in Harare and in Zimbabwe after its main sporting rival, St George's College.

The School's badge is a crown and three feathers, granted to it by Prince Edward (later King Edward VIII of the UK) in the 1920s. The school's colours are maroon and dark green. For its centenary, Prince Edward School adopted a new coat of arms which does not replace the school's badge. The motto of the school "Tot Facienda Parum Factum" ("So much to do, So little done") is attributed as Cecil John Rhodes' last words.

In 2010 a former master at the school, Douglas Robb, became headmaster of Oswestry School in England and developed links between the two schools.

=== Name controversy ===
In 2002, before the March 2002 presidential elections, the Ministry of Education announced plans to change names of all government schools that had colonial connotations. Scores of government schools were set to have their names changed to honour liberation war heroes, past national and African personalities and/or the suburban area in which the school is located. Prince Edward School was set to be renamed Murenga Boys High School after a Njelele high spirit said to have assisted the local heroes who fought the First Chimurenga of 1896–7. The change of names did not occur but in its wake, as a compromise, the Games Houses within the school had their colonial names changed to those of rivers in Zimbabwe.

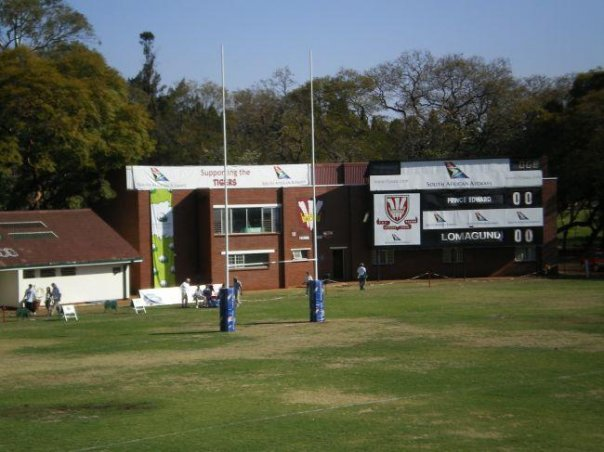
Jubilee field

== Alumni ==
Prince Edward old boys are called "Old Hararians". The Old Hararians Association was founded in 1922 and maintains very close ties with the school.

The Old Hararians cricket team is based the Old Hararians Sports Club in Harare, and fields a team in the Vigne Cup, the Harare Metropolitan Cricket League, as well as the National League for club cricket. Old Hararians contain many national team and "A" team, such as Vusi Sibanda, Prosper Utseya and Ryan Butterworth.

=== Notable alumni ===
- Allan Anderson - Pentecostal minister and theologian
- Miles Anderson – actor
- Kevin Arnott – cricketer
- Sir Hugh Beadle – lawyer, politician and judge
- Pieter Benade - rugby player and coach
- Eddo Brandes – cricketer
- John Bredenkamp – rugby player and businessman
- Ryan Butterworth – cricketer
- Tonderai Chavanga – rugby union player
- Graeme Cremer – cricketer
- Colin Dowdeswell – tennis player
- Jackie du Preez – cricketer
- Duncan Fletcher – cricketer
- Robert Gwaze – chess player
- Graeme Hick – cricketer
- David Houghton – cricketer
- Tino Kadewere - footballer
- Sam Levy – businessman and property developer
- Rodwell Makoto – chess player
- James Manyika – consultant, academic, Rhodes Scholar
- Evan Mawarire – pastor and democratic activist
- Barry May – cricketer and Rhodes Scholar
- Peter McLaughlin – academic, historian, and educator
- Mark McNulty – golfer
- John McPhun – cricketer
- Iain Mills - Conservative Party politician in The House of Commons
- Leonard Ray Morgan – educationalist
- Lucian Msamati – actor
- David Mutendera – cricketer
- Faustine Ndugulile – politician and Tanzanian member of parliament
- Trevor Penney – cricketer
- John Plagis – pilot
- David E. Potter – businessman and engineer
- Nick Price – golfer
- Ian Robertson – Springbok rugby player
- Douglas Rogers – writer
- Herbert Schwamborn – musician
- Colin Smith – rower
- Alexander Steele – Scottish architect and cricketer
- Colin Style - poet and writer
- Edmoore Takaendesa – rugby player
- Wrex Tarr – comedian and archer
- Russell Tiffin – cricket umpire
- Denis Tomlinson – cricketer
- Sir Robert Tredgold, K.C.M.G., judge, politician and Rhodes Scholar
- Kennedy Tsimba – rugby player
- Mark Vermeulen – cricketer

== See also ==
- List of schools in Zimbabwe
- List of boarding schools
