= La malédiction =

1991 adventure video game

- Developer(s): Lankhor
- Platform(s): Amstrad CPC
- Release: 1991
- Genre(s): Adventure

La malédiction is a French adventure video game developed by Fabien Privat for the Amstrad CPC and published in 1991 by Lankhor. In the game, a wizard named Xarton casts a curse upon the forest of Enar. The game was met with polarized reviews upon release.

== Development ==
The drawings for the game's art assets were all made by hand, then transferred to transparent millimeter paper to "pixelize" the scene, as Privat did not have access to a scanner.

== Reception ==
Ratings for the game cover a wide span from 20% to 76%.
