= Penn's Peak =

Entertainment and banquet venue in Northeastern Pennsylvania

Coordinates: 40.8839°N 75.6804°W

- "The Peak"
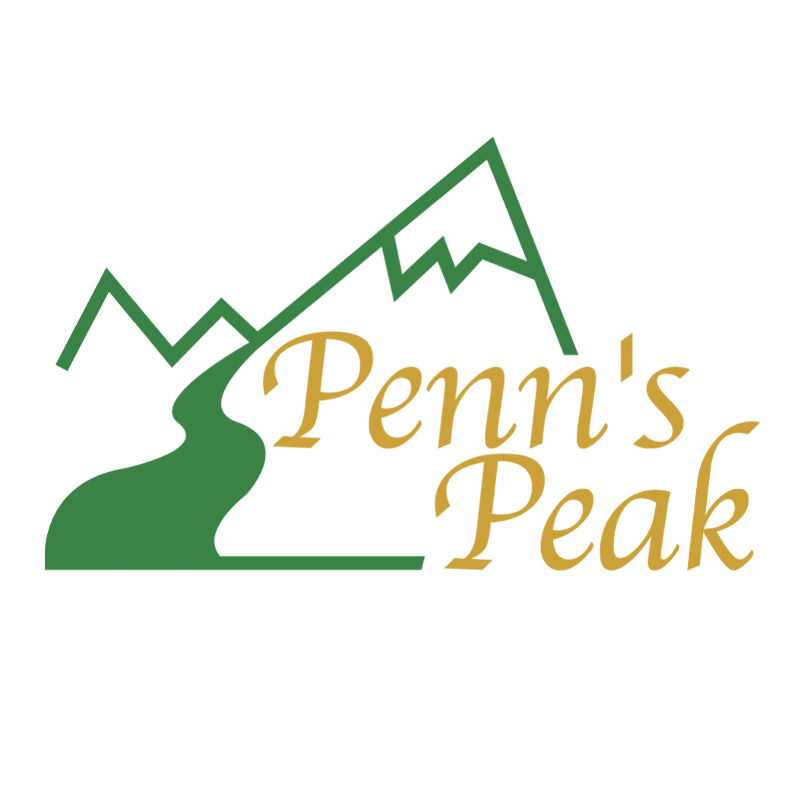
- The logo for the Penn's Peak venue

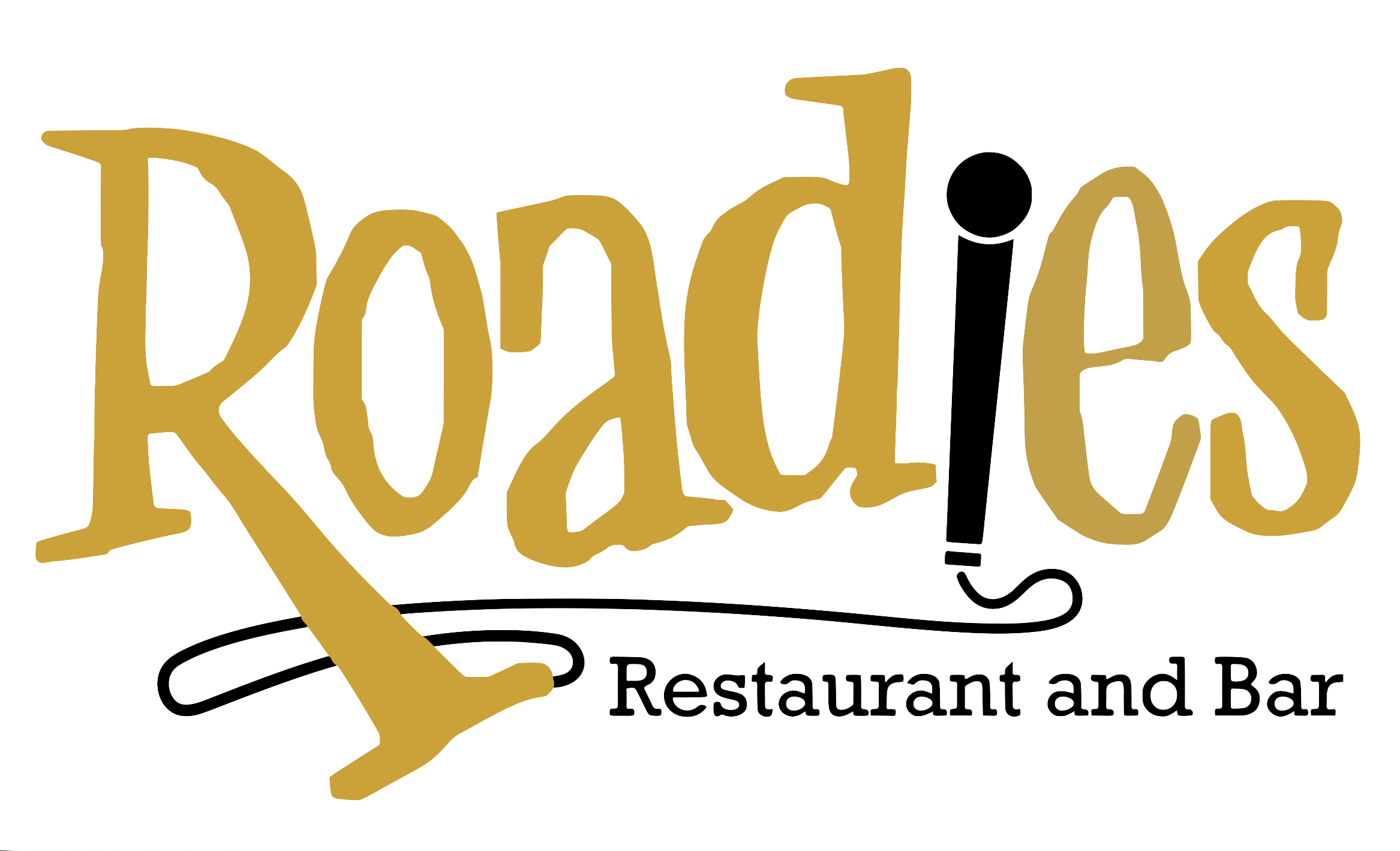
- The Roadies Restaurant and Bar logo

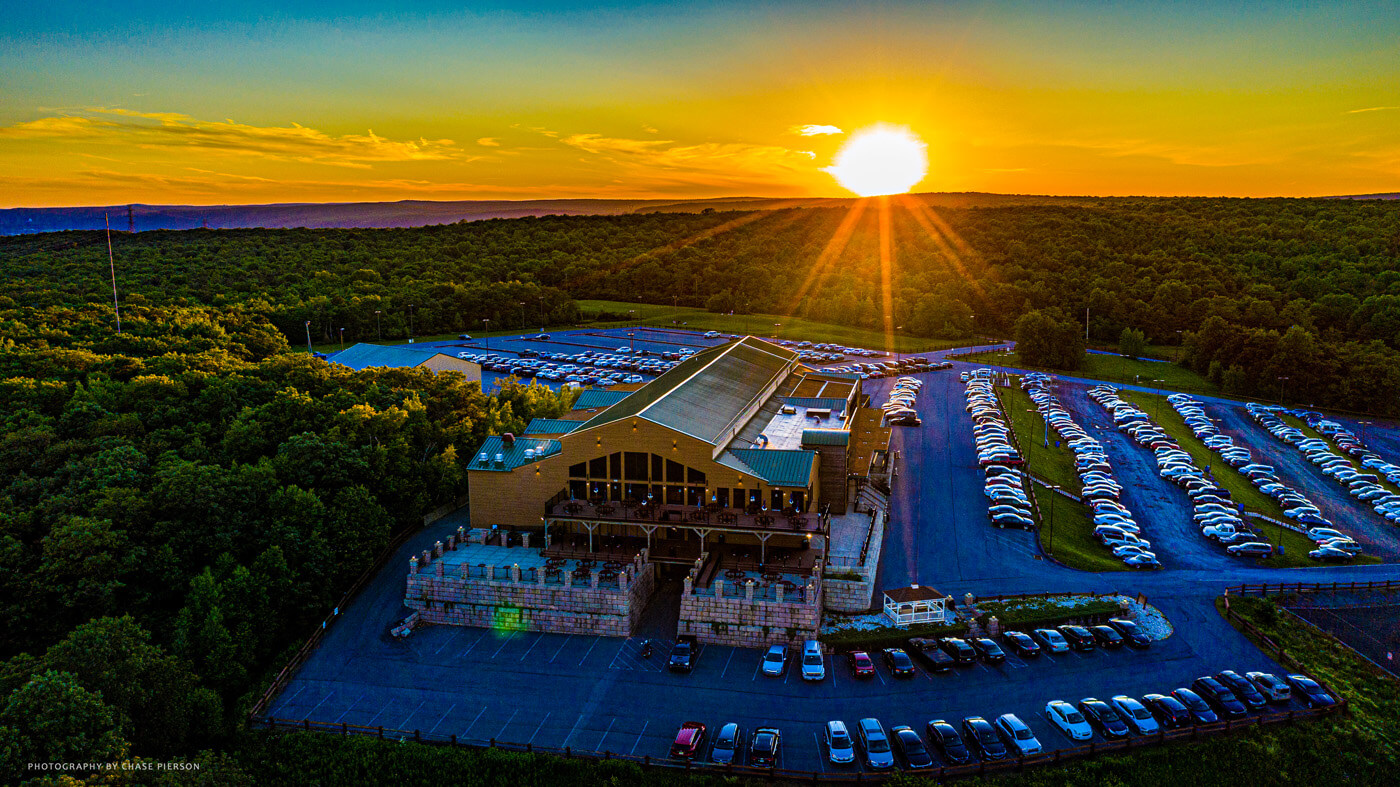
- Skyline shot of the Penn's Peak venue
- Former names: Rambler's Ranch (1998-2001)
- Address: 325 Maury Road, Jim Thorpe, Pennsylvania, 18229 United States
- Owner: Pencor Services, Inc.
- Seating type: General Admission and Reserved Seating
- Capacity: 1,500 reserved seating, up to 2,000 general admission standing
- Executive suites: 3 (PenTeleData, Hager, & Sneak Peak)
- Parking: Plenty of parking

Construction
- Built: 1998
- Opened: 1998 as "Rambler's Ranch"
- Closed: 2001
- Reopened: 2003 as "Penn's Peak" and "Roadies Restaurant and Bar"
- Years active: 21 years

Website
- Penn's Peak: Official website, Roadies Restaurant: Official website

Penn's Peak is a hilltop live concert and entertainment venue located within the Pocono Mountains of Jim Thorpe, Pennsylvania. It can seat 1,500 concertgoers with reserved seating and up to 2,000 concertgoers with general admission seating. It is accompanied by Roadies Restaurant and Bar, which has an outdoor deck that with panoramic valley views of up to 50+ miles.

== About ==
Penn's Peak, owned and operated by Pencor Services Inc., serves as a concert hall for both national and tribute acts, as well as a hall for banquets such as weddings, proms, and other gatherings. During the summer, Penn's Peak hosts "deck parties," in which smaller acts perform on the lower outside deck as guests are served by Roadies Restaurant and Bar. Penn's Peak also hosts many matinee shows.

== National acts ==
There have been various national acts that have performed at the Penn's Peak venue. These acts include: Billy Ray Cyrus, Howie Mandel, Lee Brice, Chris Janson, Warrant, Gary Allan, FireHouse, Brad Paisley, Josh Turner, Flogging Molly, Ted Nugent, Trace Adkins, Nick Carter, Buckcherry, Rodney Atkins, Chris Cagle, Andrew Dice Clay, Clint Black, Three Dog Night, Grace Potter, Travis Tritt, Randy Houser, moe., Dokken, Donny Osmond, Jason Aldean, Dierks Bentley, B-52's, Kansas, Tanya Tucker, The Pretenders, and America.

== Roadies Restaurant and Bar ==
Roadies Restaurant and Bar is a restaurant within the Penn's Peak concert venue. It also offers banquet services for event taking place within the Penn's Peak venue, such as weddings, proms, and deck parties that take place at the Penn's Peak venue.

It includes a large outdoor deck, with views of up to 50 miles. It is considered to be a destination within the historic town of Jim Thorpe.

== Suites ==
Penn's Peak also offers rentable suites for shows and events taking place at the hall. Employees of Pencor Services, Inc. and PenTeleData are able to rent out the PenTeleData suite. The Hager suite is able to be rented by anyone. The Sneak Peak suite is exclusive to members of its "Sneak Peak" club.

== History ==
=== Rambler's Ranch (1998–2001) ===
Built by a local country musician named Tommy Schafer in 1998, Penn's Peak was originally titled Rambler's Ranch. Rambler's Ranch was a venue hall and restaurant for country music fans, inspired by Nashville, Tennessee. It has drawn in thousands of country music fans with its restaurant service, dance hall, and sweeping valley views. It included two full bars: a guitar-shaped bar and a piano-shaped bar, with retro 50's country decor.

Rambler's Ranch closed in 2001 due to lack of revenue. Reports state that the ranch could have stayed open had it expanded its audience beyond country music fans. Executive director of the Pocono Mountains Vacation Bureau, Bob Uguccioni, expressed his concern that many people didn't realize the high quality of entertainment that was offered at Rambler's Ranch, which ultimately led to its foreclosure.

=== Pencor Services takeover and rebrand (2003) ===
In 2003, Pencor Services, Inc., a leading communications company in Northeastern Pennsylvania, purchased Rambler's Ranch for about $5M USD. After spending about $250K in renovations, including the addition of a gift shop and two luxury suites, Rambler's Ranch reopened as Penn's Peak, and the restaurant was rebranded as Roadies Restaurant and Bar.

In 2008, Penn's Peak went through another $4.8M USD in renovations, giving Penn's Peak a new entrance, lobby, box office, and major heating and air conditioning improvements. It also brought about Penn's Peak radio station, Penn's Peak Radio.
