= Killdozers =

1988 video game

- Publisher: Lankhor
- Platform: Atari ST
- Release: 1988
- Genre: Action
- Mode: Single-player

Killdozers is an action game for the Atari ST developed by Nicolas Choukroun and Cristophe Fiorio for the French games studio Lankhor. It was published by Lankhor in 1988.

== Plot ==
Players control various tanks as they battle Unicom, a rogue computer, and an army of evil robots. The player must infiltrate a factory and free a series of engineers from the robots.

== Reception ==
The Games Machine gave it a score of 37% and wrote that "Killdozers is an uninteresting game, beefed up with reasonable 16-bit graphics and sampled sound FX." A review from ST Action wrote "you might think it contains all the necessary ingredients to warrant a purchase. But there is something lacking in the content of the game which fails to inspire and maintain your interest."
