= Sani Yakubu Rodi =

- Born: 1975 or 1981
- Died: 3 January 2002; Katsina State
- Conviction: 3 counts of murder

Details
- Date: 2001
- Killed: 3

Sani Yakubu Rodi (b. 1975 or 1981, according to conflicting reports) was the first prisoner to be executed under state-level Sharia law in Nigeria. He was hanged in a prison in Katsina State on January 3, 2002, for the 2001 fatal stabbing of a woman and her two children; however, he did not have legal representation at his trial (opting for self-defense), and had pleaded not guilty at his initial hearing, but had changed to a guilty plea at a later hearing, after which he was sentenced to death by hanging.

So far, Rodi's execution is the first and only execution to have taken place under sharia in Nigeria.
