= Gavin Rennie =

Zimbabwean cricketer (born 1976)

Cricket information
- Batting: Left-handed
- Bowling: Slow left-arm orthodox

Career statistics
Competition	Test	ODIs
Matches	23	40
Runs scored	1,023	617
Batting average	22.73	19.90
100s/50s	0/7	0/2
Top score	93	76
Balls bowled	126	90
Wickets	1	2
Bowling average	84.00	37.50
5 wickets in innings	0	0
10 wickets in match	0	0
Best bowling	1/40	1/17
Catches/stumpings	13/–	16/–
- Source: Cricinfo, 11 February 2006

Gavin James Rennie (born 12 January 1976) is a former Zimbabwean cricketer who played in 23 Test matches and 40 One Day Internationals from 1996 to 2003. He was a left-hand top-order batsman and slow left-arm orthodox bowler although his bowling was mainly restricted to first class cricket.

His older brother John also played for Zimbabwe and in 1996–97 against Pakistan, history was made when the two played together along with the Strang and Flower brothers. It was the first time that three sets of brothers had played together in a game.

Rennie had a good start to his Test career, scoring half centuries in each of his first four Tests during 1997–98. He never scored a Test hundred and had to settle for a highest score of 93, made against New Zealand in 2000. Rennie holds the record for the most Test matches in a complete career (23) where a batsman batted twice in every match.

Rennie and Grant Flower set the record for the highest 2nd wicket partnership for Zimbabwe in ODI cricket (150).

He was part of the Zimbabwean squad which won their first ever Test series away from home, against Pakistan in 1998–99.

Aged just 27, Rennie chose not to renew his contract in 2003 and instead chose to go into business, as a transport broker. Today, he is the co-owner of a safari camp in Zimbabwe.

== Sources ==
- Gavin Rennie at Cricinfo
