= Whenwe =

Term

A whenwe is a former British settler or expatriate who talks nostalgically about their former homes in colonial Africa, i.e.: "when we lived in..." (the origin of the term).

The original "whenwes" came from eastern Africa, mostly Kenya. Being largely of colonial origin, they returned to the United Kingdom or moved south to Rhodesia in the early 1960s. In 1978, Louis W. Bolze and Rose Martin published their satiric cartoon book The Whenwes of Rhodesia.

The next wave of whenwes left Rhodesia about 1980, at the end of the Rhodesian Bush War. Thousands of white Rhodesians moved to South Africa, especially to Natal. The latter nation maintained apartheid until 1994.

== See also ==
- Pieds-noirs
- Retornados
- Rhodie
