= Morgan High School Harare =

Morgan High School

Location
- P.O. Box CY804; Harare; Zimbabwe
- 17.8428°S 31.0583°E

Information
- School type: Day schooling
- Established: 1956
- Head of school: Mr Muchenga
- Grades: Form 1–6
- Gender: Co-education
- Colors: Grey, blue and black
- Slogan: Ideas Morgan Ideals
- Team name: Stallions
- Website: www.morganhigh.co.zw

Morgan High School is a state high school in Harare, Zimbabwe.

== History ==
The school was founded in 1956 and named after Leonard Ray Morgan, the first permanent Secretary for Education in the Federation of Rhodesia & Nyasaland. It is situated in Arcadia, Harare. It was originally established to serve the needs of the Coloured and Asian communities in Mashonaland.

During the 1979 Rhodesian general election Morgan High School was used to house members of the Commonwealth Monitoring Force in Rhodesia.

== Notable alumni ==
- Ali Shah, cricketer
