= Brian Raftopoulos =

Brian Raftopoulos is a Mellon Senior Research Mentor at the Centre for Humanities Research at the University of the Western Cape and a former associate professor of development studies at the University of Zimbabwe. He first emigrated to South Africa in 2006 to serve as director of research and advocacy in the human rights NGO Solidarity Peace Trust.
