= Rody & Mastico =

1989 video game

- Platform(s): Atari ST, Amiga, Amstrad CPC, MS-DOS
- Release: 1989
- Genre(s): Educational

Rody and Mastico is a 1989 educational interactive storybook video game for children, released on Atari ST, Amiga, Amstrad CPC, and MS-DOS. The game was available in English, French, and German. The game was coded by Jean-Michel Forgeas. A seventh unofficial episode, Rody in Ibiza, was developed by fans in 2016.

== Plot and gameplay ==
The game consists of 6 parts, each developing the story further toward its ultimate conclusion. The protagonist Rody and his companion Mastico are on a quest to locate the multicoloured star. To progress through the story, players must correctly answer questions.

== Reception ==
Reception

Review scores
Publication	Score
Génération4 (R&M)	16/20
Amstrad (R&M2)	77%
Joystick (R&M)	60%
Tilt (R&M)	B
Tilt (R&M3)	7/10

A review in Joystick gave the original game a rating of 60%, while two separate reviews of the sequel gave scores of 78%, and 89%. Amstar praised the graphics, deeming them appealing to the game's target market.

The software was nominated by Tilt for an Educational Gold Tilt award for Best Educational Software.
