= Goffal =

Ethnic group in southern Africa

Goffals or Coloured Zimbabweans are persons of mixed race, predominately those claiming both European and African descent, in Malawi, Zambia, and, particularly Zimbabwe. They are generally known as Coloureds, though the term Goffal is used by some in the Coloured community to refer to themselves, though this does not refer to the mixed-race community in nearby South Africa. The community includes many diverse constituents of Shona, Northern Ndebele, Bemba, Fengu, British, Afrikaner, Cape Coloured, Cape Malay and less commonly Portuguese, Greek, Goan, and Indian descent. Similar mixed-race communities exist throughout Southern Africa, notably the Cape Coloureds of South Africa.

It is not clear when the term Goffal first entered common usage, but among Coloureds themselves it had surfaced by the mid- to late 1970s. Their precise numbers are difficult to ascertain, because some identify exclusively as members of other ethnic groups.

== History ==
=== Zimbabwe ===
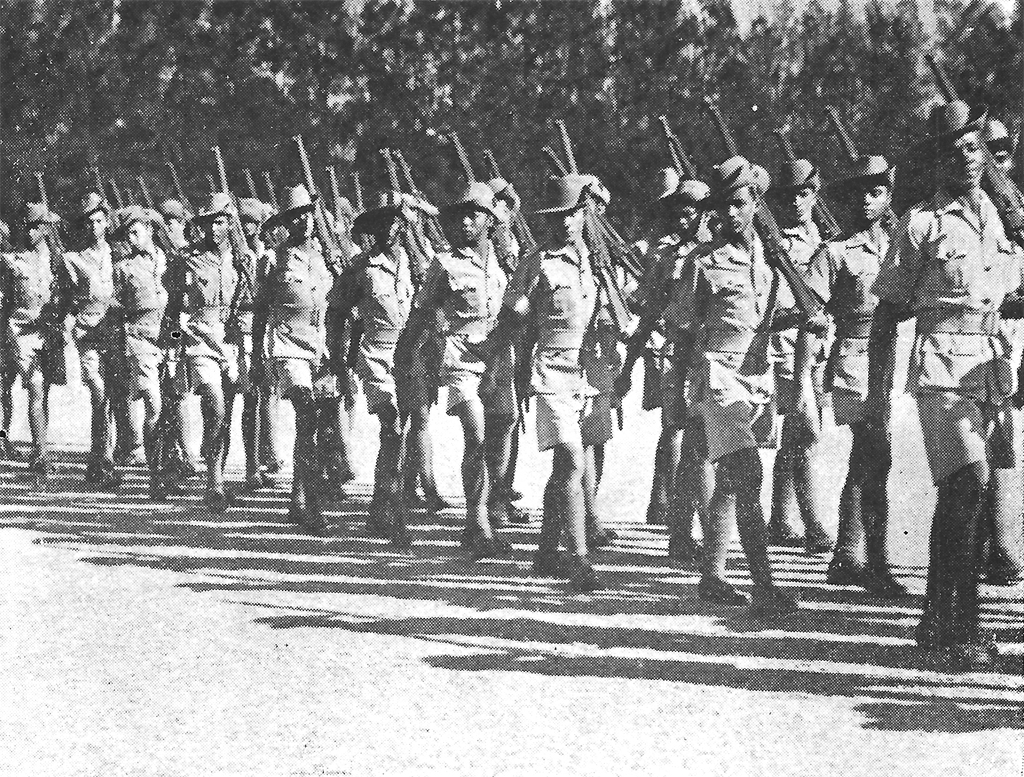
Coloured and Indian military personnel on parade in Southern Rhodesia, 1940.

The earliest Coloured communities in central Africa were formed in Southern Rhodesia (present-day Zimbabwe), mainly by those who had emigrated as servants of Afrikaners and other white South African settlers from the Cape of Good Hope. Coloured immigration from South Africa spiked following a depression after the Second Boer War and continuing throughout much of the early twentieth century. By the 1930s most local Coloureds had been born in Southern Rhodesia as offspring of British administrators and colonists and local women. The Coloured populace increased to about 24,000 through intermarriage, and by 1969 about 91% were considered Rhodesian citizens, a smaller number being Zambians, Malawians, and South Africans. During World War II, Coloureds served with distinction alongside Southern Rhodesian units during the East African Campaign. One notable case of inter-racial marriage in Southern Rhodesia which received attention from Time Magazine in 1958 was that of Patrick Matimba, a black storekeeper who was able to live with his white wife and their racially mixed daughter by having status as his wife's servant.

Southern Rhodesia, which had unilaterally declared independence as Rhodesia in 1965, classified Coloureds as persons of mixed ancestry who did not follow a traditional African way of life and whose culture was European in origin and form. Coloureds who lived with black African families were notably excluded, as were those who physically passed for Europeans and Asians, respectively. However, despite the noticeable presence of racial segregation in Southern Rhodesia, it was not as severe as it was under the apartheid regime of South Africa. Coloured Rhodesians were heavily urbanised, and the colonial government permitted them to live in segregated neighbourhoods reserved for Europeans. In 1969 the largest proportion of working Coloureds—about 30%— were employed by the Rhodesian manufacturing sector, the remainder being tradesmen or engaged in service delivery.

At the outbreak of the Rhodesian Bush War, conscription was enforced for all male Coloureds of military age, who were expected to contribute four to five months of service to the Rhodesian Security Forces. In 1966, the Ministry of Defence gave notice that it would henceforth extend conscription to all foreigners with residency status, making Coloureds of South African or other nationalities in Rhodesia also liable for military service. Most Coloured recruits were assigned to the Reinforcement Holding Unit (RHU), which was primarily concerned with transport and logistics. They were also tasked with providing convoy security and guarding installations targeted for sabotage by insurgents. In 1978 the RHU was reorganised into the Rhodesian Defence Regiment. As the war intensified, Coloured personnel deployed to operational areas successfully petitioned to receive the same pay as white soldiers.

When Rhodesia was reconstituted as the new Republic of Zimbabwe in 1980, accompanied by the electoral triumph of leading black nationalist Robert Mugabe and his Zimbabwe African National Union, Coloureds numbered about 20,000. Mugabe won the country's first general elections held under a universal franchise, despite facing militant opposition from Joshua Nkomo's Zimbabwe African People's Union (ZAPU) and a number of minority parties. All Coloureds registered in the Rhodesian electoral system prior to December 31, 1979 were permitted to vote, and those that did so overwhelmingly endorsed the Rhodesian Front. As a conciliatory gesture Mugabe later nominated a leading member of the Coloured community, Joseph Culverwell, to the Senate, the upper house of the Parliament of Zimbabwe. Nevertheless, ZANU's ascension was greeted with caution. During the bush war, black nationalists frequently decried Coloureds as having benefited unjustly from the colonial racial hierarchy, and those who attempted to join ZANU and ZAPU's guerrilla armies were often detained or executed as spies. Less educated, blue collar Coloured workers were also concerned they would face job displacement from an advancing black workforce once they lost the advantage of preferential employment by white supervisors. Others seemed convinced only blacks would benefit economically under Mugabe's rule, at the expense of themselves and other ethnic minorities. For their part, community activists were disappointed they weren't invited to participate at the Lancaster House talks on behalf of their people, and felt this demonstrated both white and black Zimbabweans were uninterested in Coloureds' future political and social welfare.

Since the 1980s, Coloured Zimbabweans have complained of being increasingly disenfranchised, and being projected as foreigners with limited rights. A Coloured lobby group, the National Association for the Advancement of Mixed Race Coloureds (NAAC), was formed in 2001 to protest against what they perceived as severe discrimination against their community by the state. The NAAC has issued a statement claiming that "Coloured people are visibly and verbally treated with disdain contemptuously dismissed with xenophobic comments" urging them to "go back to Britain". NAAC activists have also highlighted the removal of Coloureds from important positions in the public service, usually following complaints by ruling party officials, and the government's steadfast refusal to grant loans to Coloured entrepreneurs. At the height of President Mugabe's land reform programme, Zimbabwean Minister of Education, Sports, and Culture Aeneas Chigwedere demanded that Coloureds be excluded from the redistribution process on racial grounds, insisting that "if we give them land it will be giving it back to the white man".

=== Zambia ===
Unlike Southern Rhodesia, Northern Rhodesia (present-day Zambia), a British possession which remained governed directly by the Colonial Office, considered "Coloured" to be a strictly South African racial distinction, and evoked the term only when referring to immigrants of mixed race from South Africa accordingly. This resulted in considerable ambivalence towards local Coloureds born in Northern Rhodesia, whom colonial officials described with a menagerie of labels as varied as "half-castes", "Anglo-Africans", "Indo-Africans", and "Eurafricans". Northern Rhodesian Coloureds often bore distinguished British surnames, having descended from some of the colony's earliest pioneers, administrators, and officials. Nevertheless, beginning in the 1920s such individuals posed a particular classification problem for the Colonial Office, which remained frustrated by the fact it could classify Coloureds neither as European nor African. The British paternity of mixed children was an especially contentious issue, allowing Coloureds to petition for recognition as British subjects, entitled to British passports. Their requests were ignored by the Colonial Office, which regarded them only as protected subjects, a status otherwise reserved for black Africans.

The question of Coloureds' legitimacy and status hinged on the legality of marriage between their European and African parents. Under the Northern Rhodesian Immorality Suppression Ordinance, it was a criminal offence for a white woman to marry or cohabit with a black man. Marriages between white men and black women, although not expressly forbidden, were likewise unrecognised by the state. As marriages of this nature were not recognised as marriage under law, the Welfare Department was empowered to seize any first-generation mixed race children resulting from such unions as "orphans".

Since Coloureds lacked segregated schools of their own, and Northern Rhodesian authorities forbade children of other races from attending the same educational institutions as Europeans, most Coloureds studied at Roman Catholic missions in Southern Rhodesia. Their exclusion from schools severely limited Coloured economic and social prospects. In 1927, the missions criticised Northern Rhodesia's practice of building schools specifically for white and black pupils while failing to provide similar facilities for Coloureds. It was proposed that the administration erect Coloured schools or at least furbish the funds for their independent construction. This scheme was approved by the Northern Rhodesian Native Education Advisory Board but rejected by Governor James Crawford Maxwell. Maxwell regarded the label "Coloured" as a purely artificial distinction, and did not believe they constituted a separate race from Europeans or Africans. He insisted that the construction of Coloured schools equated to official recognition of an ethnic group that did not exist. Maxwell's habit of arguing that Coloureds should identify either as Europeans or Africans, rather than a distinct mixed race population, became policy in Northern Rhodesia for the next three decades. Coloureds who physically resembled Europeans and lived like Europeans were treated as such, while those who lived as Africans or with black families were classified as native. In this regard Northern Rhodesia represented a marked departure from South Africa, where racial legislation strictly defined the rights and status of individuals from birth. Some Coloureds became integrated with African society; others joined white social clubs, received managerial jobs reserved for whites, and lived in affluent white neighbourhoods.

In 1952, the Coloured community petitioned Henry Hopkinson, the United Kingdom's newly appointed Minister of State for the Colonies, for recognition as British subjects. The Coloureds argued that the British Nationality Act 1948 had reaffirmed their status as protected subjects instead, and expressed disappointment that unlike white Rhodesians they could only obtain British subject status through naturalisation. Their grievances were discussed in the Colonial Office, which responded that if a marriage between a male British subject and an African woman was properly documented, any children should be allowed to take up their father's nationality. The Colonial Office also observed through its inquiries that Coloured housing in Northern Rhodesia was almost nonexistent and ordered the administration to see the issue resolved. Their request resulted in the establishment of "Coloured Quarters", residential areas in all major towns built specifically for Coloured people, often situated near the railway lines. The Coloured Quarters included segregated schools and social clubs. Most of their residents were employed by the Public Works Department and Rhodesia Railways, which also offered economic housing.

When Northern Rhodesia became a constituent territory of the Federation of Rhodesia and Nyasaland, most Coloureds failed to qualify for citizenship under federal law, which stipulated all citizens must also be British subjects. The new electoral roll established that voters had to possess a secondary education and earn an income of at least £720 a year. While a percentage of Southern Rhodesian Coloureds could meet these standards, owing to their longstanding educational disadvantages and the lack of schools few Coloureds in Northern Rhodesia had received anything more than the most basic primary education. This, in turn, restricted their avenues of employment: the average monthly income for Coloured men in Lusaka was between £15 and £25 a month.

Following the dissolution of the federation and Zambian independence in 1964, many Coloured parents began sending their children abroad to avoid military conscription into the Zambian Defence Force. The British Nationality Act 1981 aroused considerable interest among Zambia's Coloured population, since it revoked a legitimacy clause from the 1948 legislation wherein only children born to legitimate marriages of their British fathers were considered British subjects. As mixed race marriages were not recognised as legitimate under Northern Rhodesian law, this excluded Coloureds. Under the statutes of the new British Nationality Act, any Zambians able to prove beyond reasonable doubt they were consanguineous descendants of a specific British citizen could apply for right of abode in the United Kingdom, irrespective of their ancestor's marital status. During the 1980s and 1990s, roughly half of Zambia's Coloured population immigrated to the United Kingdom.

In 1980 there were 6,000 Coloureds remaining in Zambia, nearly all of them concentrated in major urban districts.

=== Malawi ===
From its inception the British protectorate of Nyasaland (present-day Malawi) included a burgeoning mixed race population of Asian, rather than European, and African descent. An exodus of migrant workers from the Indian subcontinent to various British dependencies across sub-Saharan Africa formed an integral part of colonial migration patterns during the early twentieth century; the Indians came to earn modest incomes which in turn supported their extended families back home. Most Indian business owners were bachelors or married men who immigrated without their wives; a number cohabited with African women accordingly. Children from these relationships were usually raised by the mother, and embraced African culture and lifestyles as their own. They were regarded with disdain by the comparatively few individuals of mixed European and African ancestry, who came to reject use of the general label "Coloured" to avoid association with the descendants of Asians. Calling themselves "Anglo-Africans", they formed the Nyasland Anglo-African Association to lobby for formal recognition. This situation gave rise to a crisis and conflict of identity over the legal definition of Coloured, a matter affecting even the Nyasaland courts.

From 1907 to 1929, Coloureds of both Indian and European parentage were accorded the same status as black Africans under the Nyasaland Interpretation Ordinance, which classified them as "natives". Educated Coloureds protested this policy, and successfully lobbied to have it challenged before the colonial judiciary. A Nyasaland judge determined that "half-castes" did not meet the legal definition of "native", although he refrained from ruling on whether their newly altered status made them British subjects. The ruling incited considerable debate about the social, legal, and political standing of mixed-descent Africans in other British colonies. The Anglo-African Association seized this opportunity to demand they be taxed as Europeans, and exempted from what they perceived as a degrading "hut tax" levied on black residents of indigenous settlements. As a result of their lobbying, Coloureds were exempted from the hut tax; ironically, however, the government failed to clarify whether this entailed also subjecting Coloureds to the same taxes as the white population—a bureaucratic oversight that resulted in the entire community paying no tax by the early 1930s.

In 1931, a Coloured man provoked a storm of controversy when he attempted to lease 200 acres in a Native Trust Area, the communal lands reserved for African farming and use. Since the courts had previously ruled Coloureds were not natives, this accelerated local discussion over the legal definition of Coloured. Deferring to the precedent set by Northern Rhodesia, the Nyasaland Attorney-General designated a Coloured person as "any person of mixed European or Asiatic and native descent, who does not live after the manner of members of the aboriginal tribes or races of Africa".

The initial success of the Anglo-African Association encouraged the formation of the mutually exclusive Nyasaland Indo-African Association, and further deepened rivalries between the two components of the Coloured population. The Indo-African Association was largely succeeded by the theoretically integrated Nyasaland Coloured Community Welfare Association, established in 1954 to present a united front for coordinated Coloured education demands. Nevertheless, the Anglo-African Association's influence remained strong, and during the inception of the Federation of Rhodesia and Nyasaland they persuaded the Federal Ministry of Education to differentiate between separate "Coloured" and "Eurafrican" agendas.

As the dissolution of the federation became apparent and independence approached for Malawi, Coloureds began to face severe job discrimination in the public sector due to an unwritten British policy which reserved civil service jobs solely for whites on short-term contracts until such a date that black Malawians could succeed them.

The Malawian government eliminated all recognition of "Coloured" as a separate ethnicity following independence.

== Demographics ==
In 1973, 83.2% of all Coloureds in Rhodesia lived in a major urban population centres, the largest number being concentrated in Bulawayo (6,630 Coloured residents) and Salisbury (6,030 Coloured residents). Only about 2,290 resided in rural areas, mostly on farms. The Rhodesian government reported that the Coloured population had an extremely high rate of natural increase of 4.9% per year. The corresponding infant mortality rate was 38 infant deaths per 1,000 live births.

According to the Zimbabwean census of 2012, the largest proportion of Coloured Zimbabweans (8,745 people) fell into the 18 to 49 age bracket. There were 5,375 individuals under 14, 2,469 aged 50 to 64, and 1,300 over 64. Slightly over 88% of Coloureds lived in a major urban population centre, although the size of the rural Coloured community remained identical to that in 1973, about 2,261 persons. Coloureds made up 0.4% of Zimbabwe's urban population and 0.1% of its total population.

The Zambian census of 1980 found that the 6,000 Coloureds were mostly located in urban areas, at which time they constituted 0.1% of Zambia's total population. Malawi has not published demographic information on Coloureds since independence.

== Society ==
Coloured societies in Zambia, Zimbabwe and the African diaspora abroad are rather close-knit, linked by intermarriage and a large web of familial connections dating back to their earliest European and Asian ancestors. Many Coloureds remaining in Zambia have documented their bloodline well and can recall the original progenitors of their family and name.

The internal ranking stratum among Coloureds is complex. During the colonial era, they identified first and foremost with the non-African component in their ancestry, and within equal socio-economic circles social prestige was dependent upon one's progenitors. For instance, Afrikaans-speaking Coloureds descended from South African immigrants typically formed the Coloured elite in Zimbabwe; they were followed in descending order on the social scale by Coloureds with one white and one Coloured parent, those with two Coloured parents, those with one white and one black parent, and the so-called "Indo-African" Coloureds with an Asian ancestor or parent. Marriages between Coloureds and black Africans were generally stigmatised, before independence in 1980, as the former preferred to select partners with visible white characteristics, though this is no longer the case today.

Coloureds of British descent from Zambia and Malawi retain strong emotional ties to the United Kingdom. When India's independence movement began gaining momentum in the late 1940s, Coloured schools in central Africa rejected Indian instructors, emphasising that "love and patriotism to the British nation" were an integral part of their curricula. Since the decolonisation of the African continent, it has been a longstanding tradition for Coloured parents to send their children to the United Kingdom for schooling. Others are sent to work there after completing their schooling locally.

Coloured Zimbabweans have traditionally been Roman Catholic, although a sizeable minority also belongs to the Anglican Church.

== Goffal Slang ==
Goffal Dictionary
