= Rhodie =

Colloquial term typically applied to a white Zimbabwean or expatriate Rhodesian

Rhodie is a colloquial term typically applied to a white Zimbabwean or expatriate Rhodesian.

== Origins of the term ==
The term Rhodie was first used by British Army and civil service personnel in Rhodesia (renamed Zimbabwe in 1980) during the period between the Lancaster House Agreement of December 1979 and the formal independence of Zimbabwe in April 1980. The term was initially applied to all white Zimbabweans. After independence, the term began to be applied increasingly to those whites who were nostalgic for the past. The nostalgia a Rhodie feels relates particularly to the UDI era (1965 to 1979), in which they fought significant socialist and communist insurgencies, and during which the predominantly white government, headed by the Prime Minister Ian Smith, declared independence from Britain in an attempt to prevent any commitment to a set timetable regarding black majority rule. The UDI project ended in the Bush War of the 1970s, fought between the Rhodesian Security Forces and the communist-backed black nationalist insurgents of the Zimbabwe African National Liberation Army (ZANLA) and the Zimbabwe People's Revolutionary Army (ZIPRA).

== Current usage of the term ==
=== Political implications ===
Usage of the term Rhodie changed further in post-independence Zimbabwe. From the early 1980s, it became associated with conservative, reactionary or racist sociopolitical views, being applied to White Zimbabweans espousing views which were politically dominant pre-1980. An image published in The Sunday Times Magazine in 1984 showed a poster near Harare reading "Private Party Invitation Only No Drugs No Rhodies No Racists No Troublemakers Allowed on These Premises".

==== Rhodie bar ====
A Rhodie bar is an establishment frequented by Rhodies and is often decorated with memorabilia of the UDI era and the Rhodesian Bush War.

== See also ==
- List of regional nicknames
- Whenwe
