= White Zimbabweans =

Ethnic group in Zimbabwe

Regions with significant populations
- Zimbabwe 24,888 (2022 census); 0.16% of the population
- South Africa: 64,261 (2002)
- Australia: 39,714 (2021)
- United Kingdom: 33,313 (2023)

Languages
- English (majority), Afrikaans, Greek, Portuguese, Italian, others (minority)

Religion
- Christianity (Majority) and Judaism

Historical population
Year	Pop.	±% p.a.
1891	1,500	—
1895	5,000	+35.12%
1900	12,000	+19.14%
1904	12,596	+1.22%
1911	23,606	+9.39%
1914	28,000	+5.86%
1920	32,620	+2.58%
1924	39,174	+4.68%
1930	47,910	+3.41%
1935	55,419	+2.95%
1940	65,000	+3.24%
1945	82,000	+4.76%
1950	125,000	+8.80%
1953	157,000	+7.89%
1960	218,000	+4.80%
1965	208,000	−0.93%
1970	237,000	+2.64%
1975	300,000	+4.83%
1979	242,000	−5.23%
1985	100,000	−13.70%
1990	80,000	−4.36%
1995	70,000	−2.64%
2002	46,743	−5.61%
2012	28,732	−4.75%
2017	16,998	−9.97%
2022	24,888	+7.92%

White Zimbabweans (formerly White Rhodesians) are an ethnocultural Southern African people of European descent. Most are English-speaking descendants of British settlers; a small minority are either Afrikaans-speaking descendants of mostly Dutch-originating Afrikaners from South Africa or descendants of Greek, Irish, Portuguese, Italian, and Jewish immigrants.

Following the establishment of the colony of Southern Rhodesia by Britain, White settlers began to move to the territory and slowly developed rural and urban communities. From 1923, the settlers concentrated on developing rich mineral resources and agricultural land in the area. In the aftermath of the Second World War, the number of White people emigrating to Rhodesia from Britain, Europe and other parts of Africa increased, almost doubling the White population, with White Rhodesians playing an integral role in the nation's strong economic development throughout the 1950s and early 1960s. At its height in the early 1970s, the number of White people in the region was the highest in Africa outside South Africa, peaking at around 300,000 people, some 5% of the population.

Various social, economic and political disparities between the Black majority and smaller White population were factors in the Rhodesian Bush War after the government of White Prime Minister Ian Smith implemented the Unilateral Declaration of Independence, establishing Rhodesia as an de facto independent state in 1965. Following the independence of Zimbabwe in 1980, the White population began to decline; many remained in the country, with some still identifying as Rhodesian. White Zimbabweans continued to represent a majority of the country's middle and upper classes during the 1980s and 1990s, but after 2000 the population shrank further as a result of violence, economic instability and controversial land reform policies enacted by the government of Robert Mugabe in which White-owned farmland was forcibly seized. White Zimbabweans reportedly faced increased levels of poverty following the deterioration of the Zimbabwean economy during the 2000s and 2010s. An influx of returning White Zimbabweans, including farmers whose lands had been confiscated, followed Mugabe's removal from power and replacement by Emmerson Mnangagwa.

Communities of White Zimbabweans continue to exist in larger towns and cities including Bulawayo and the Harare metropolitan area, with numerous Harare suburbs such as Avondale, Mount Pleasant and Borrowdale hosting significant White populations. According to the 2022 census, White Zimbabweans numbered 24,888, representing 0.16% of the national population.

== Background ==
Present-day Zimbabwe (known as Southern Rhodesia from 1895) was occupied by the British South Africa Company (BSAC) from the 1890s onward, following its subjugation of the Matabele (Ndebele) and Shona nations. Early White settlers came in search of mineral resources, hoping to find a second gold-rich Witwatersrand. Zimbabwe lies on a plateau that varies in altitude between 900 and 1,500 m (2,950 and 4,900 ft) above sea level. This gives the area a moderate climate which was conducive to European settlement and commercial agriculture.

White settlers who assisted in the BSAC takeover of the country were given land grants of 1,200 hectares (3,000 acres); the native Black people who had long lived on the land were classified legally as tenants. In 1930, Land Apportionment and Tenure Acts displaced Africans from the country's best farmland, restricting them to unproductive and low-rainfall tribal-trust lands. It reserved areas of high rainfall for White ownership. White settlers were attracted to Rhodesia by the availability of tracts of prime farmland that could be purchased from the state at low cost. This resulted in the growth of commercial agriculture in the young colony. The White farm was typically a large (>100 km^{2} (>38.6 mi^{2})) mechanized estate, owned by a White family and employing hundreds of Black people. Many White farms provided housing, schools and clinics for Black employees and their families. At the time of independence in 1980, more than 40% of the country's farmed land was made up of approximately 5,000 White farms. At the time, agriculture provided 40% of the country's GDP and up to 60% of its foreign earnings. Major export products included tobacco, beef, sugar, cotton and maize. The minerals sector was also important. Gold, asbestos, nickel and chromium were mined by foreign-owned concerns such as Lonrho (Lonmin since 1999) and Anglo American.

The Census of 3 May 1921 found that Southern Rhodesia had a total population of 899,187, of whom 33,620 were Europeans; 1,998 were Coloured (mixed race); 1,250 Asiatics; 761,790 Bantu natives of Southern Rhodesia; and 100,529 Bantu aliens. The following year, Southern Rhodesians rejected, in a referendum, the option of becoming a province of the Union of South Africa. Instead, the country became a self-governing British colony. It never gained full dominion status, but unlike other colonies, it was treated as a de facto dominion, with its Prime Minister attending the Commonwealth Prime Ministers' Conferences.

== History ==
Portuguese explorer António Fernandes was the first European to visit the region.

=== Settlement ===
In 1891, before Southern Rhodesia was established as a territory, it was estimated that about 1,500 Europeans resided there. This number grew slowly to around 75,000 in 1945. In the period 1945 to 1955, the White population doubled to 150,000, and during that decade 100,000 Black people were forcibly resettled from farmland designated for White ownership. However, some members of the White farming community opposed the forced removal of Black people from land designated for White ownership. Some favoured the transfer of underutilised "White land" to Black farmers. For example, in 1947, Wedza White farmer Harry Meade unsuccessfully opposed the eviction of his Black neighbour Solomon Ndawa from a 200-hectare (500-acre) irrigated wheat farm. Meade represented Ndawa at hearings of the Land Commission and attempted to protect Ndawa from abusive questioning.

A Rhodesian couple plays golf, attended by their native caddies. Taken from a 1970 Rhodesian government booklet promoting White immigration, titled "The Good Life".

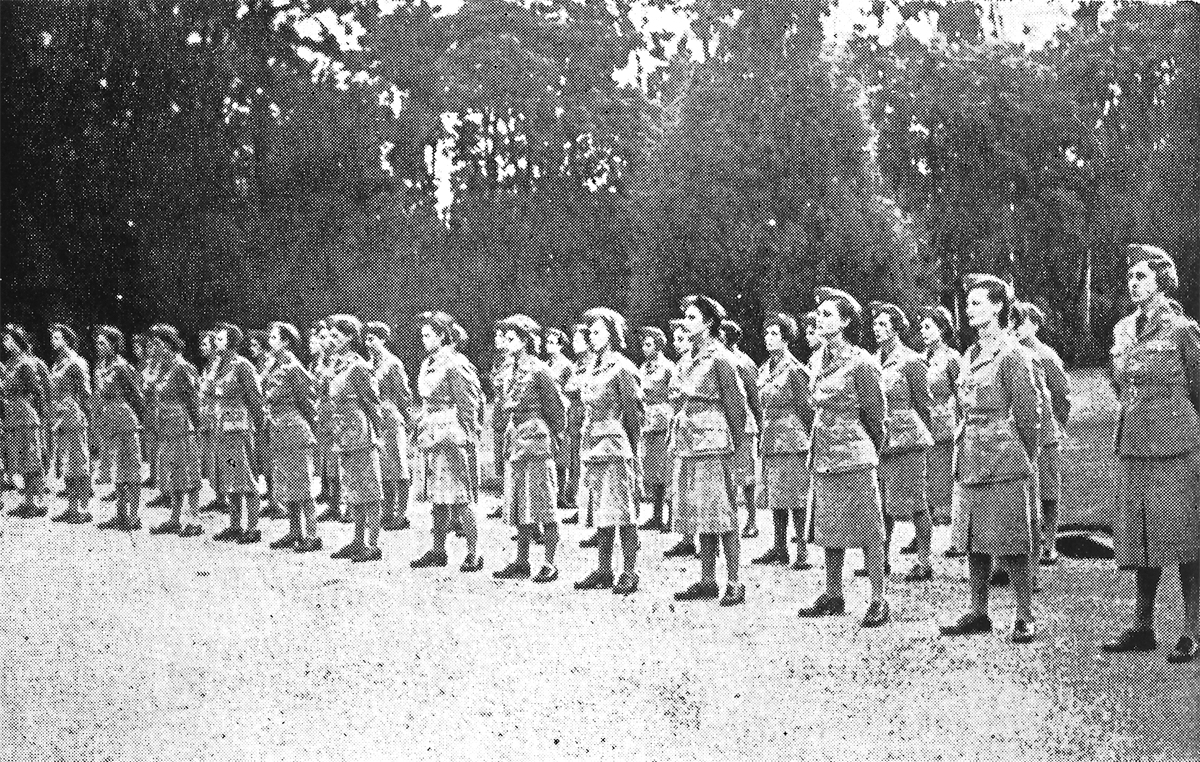
The Rhodesian Women's Military Auxiliary Service on parade in Salisbury, December 1941

Large-scale migration to Rhodesia did not begin until after the Second World War. At the colony's first comprehensive census in 1962, Rhodesia had 221,000 White residents. At its peak in the mid-1970s, Rhodesia's White population consisted of as many as 277,000. There were influxes of White settlers from the 1940s through to the early 1970s. The country saw a net gain of 9,400 White immigrants in 1971, the highest number since 1957 and the third highest on record. In the immediate postwar period, the most conspicuous group were former British servicemen. However, many of the new immigrants were refugees from Communism in Europe; others were former service personnel from British India, or came from the former Kenya Colony, the Belgian Congo, Zambia, Algeria, and Mozambique. For a time, Rhodesia provided something of a haven for White people who were retreating from decolonisation elsewhere in Africa and Asia. In 1974 the Smith government launched a massive campaign to attract one million Europeans to settle in the country.

Post-World War II Rhodesian White settlers were considered different in character from earlier Rhodesian settlers and those from other British colonies. In Kenya, settlers were perceived to be drawn from "the officer class" and from the British landowning class. By contrast, settlers in Rhodesia after the Second World War were perceived as being drawn from lower social strata and were treated accordingly by the British authorities. As Peter Godwin wrote in The Guardian, "Foreign Office mandarins dismissed Rhodesians as lower middle class, no more than provincial clerks and artisans, the lowly NCOs of empire."

Various factors encouraged the growth of the White population of Rhodesia. These included the industrialisation and prosperity of the economy in the post-war period. The National Party victory in South Africa was one of the factors that led to the formation of the Central African Federation (1953–1963), so as to provide a bulwark against Afrikaner nationalism. British settlement and investment boomed during the Federation years, as Southern Rhodesia, Northern Rhodesia (now Zambia), and Nyasaland (now Malawi) formed a powerful economic unit, counterbalancing the economic power of South Africa. The economic power of these three areas was a major factor in the establishment of the Federation through a British Act of Parliament. It was also apparent as early as the 1950s that White rule would continue for longer in Rhodesia than it would in other British colonies such as Zambia (Northern Rhodesia) and Kenya. Many of the new immigrants had a "not here" attitude to majority rule and independence.

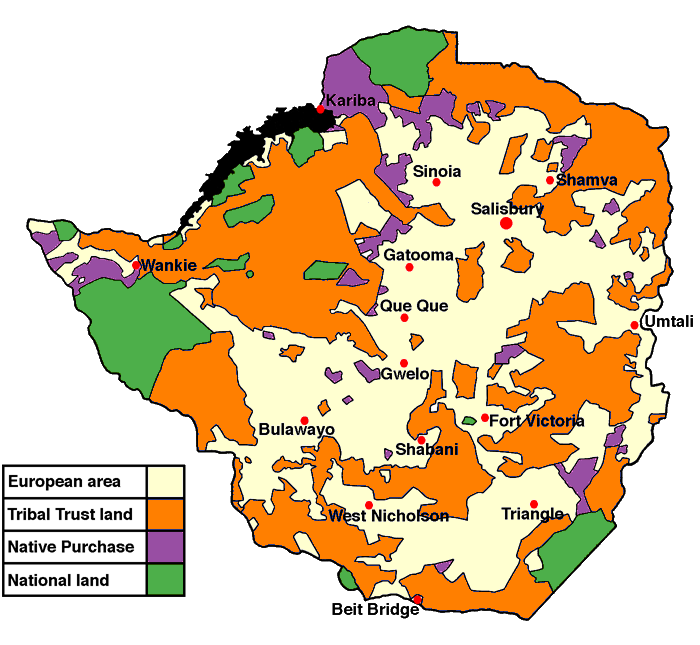
Land apportionment in Rhodesia in 1965

Rhodesia was run by a White minority government. In 1965, that government declared itself independent through a Unilateral Declaration of Independence ('UDI') under Prime Minister Ian Smith. The UDI project eventually failed, after a period of United Nations economic sanctions and a civil war known as the Chimurenga (Shona) or Bush War. British colonial rule returned in December 1979, when the country became the British Dependency of Southern Rhodesia. In April 1980, it was granted independence as Zimbabwe.

The White Rhodesian community kept itself largely separate from the Black and Asian communities in the country. Urban White Rhodesians lived in separate areas of town, and had their own segregated education, healthcare and recreational facilities. Marriage between Black and White Rhodesians was possible but rare, and interracial marriage remains to the present day very rare. The 1903 Immorality Suppression Ordinance made "illicit" (i.e. unmarried) sex between Black men and White women illegal – with a penalty of two years' imprisonment for any offending White woman. The majority of the early White immigrants were men, and some White men entered into relationships with Black women. The result was a small number of mixed-race persons: 1,998 out of a total 899,187 inhabitants, according to the 1921 census, some of whom were accepted as being White. A proposal by Garfield Todd (Prime Minister in 1953–1958) to liberalise the laws regarding interracial sex was viewed as dangerously radical. The proposal was rejected and was one factor that led to the political demise of Todd.

White Rhodesians enjoyed a very high standard of living. The Land Tenure Act had reserved 30% of agricultural land for White ownership. Black labour costs were low (around US$40 per month in 1975) and included free housing, food and clothing. Nurses earned US$120 per month. The low wages had a large effect in the context of an agricultural economy. Public spending on education, healthcare and other social services was heavily weighted towards White people. Most of the better paid jobs in public service were also reserved for White people. White people in skilled manual occupations enjoyed employment protection against Black competition. In 1975, the average annual income for a Rhodesian was around US$8,000 (equivalent to $48,000 in 2025) with income tax at a marginal rate of 5% — making them one of the richest communities in the world.

=== Rhodesia ===
In a 1922 referendum, the community rejected joining the Union of South Africa, electing instead to establish responsible government. In the 1964 Rhodesian independence referendum, the community voted overwhelmingly in favour of independence from Britain, leading to Rhodesia's Unilateral Declaration of Independence establishing the independent state of Rhodesia under Prime Minister Ian Smith. Many White Rhodesians were concerned about the prospect of decolonisation with majority rule due to conflicts that had taken place in other former British colonies such as the Mau Mau rebellion in Kenya. Civil unrest had also occurred in other former European colonies such as the Belgian Congo where the White population had been targets for violence and Algeria where pieds-noirs settlers fled the country en-masse after independence.

Following the UDI, the White community was embroiled in the Rhodesian Bush War (1964–1979), as the Smith government sought to maintain White minority rule. White men were conscripted into the Rhodesian Security Forces and the British South Africa Police. White civilians were targeted in attacks such as Air Rhodesia Flight 825 and Air Rhodesia Flight 827. The community faced fresh economic challenges during the UDI period as Britain imposed economic sanctions and Mozambique closed its border in 1976, blocking Rhodesia's access to the Indian Ocean and world commerce. Rhodesia was excluded from major sporting events, meaning that its White athletes were unable to participate in the 1968, 1972 and 1976 Olympic Games.

A small number of British migrants had reached the British colony of Southern Rhodesia, later Zimbabwe, as settlers during the late-nineteenth century. A steady migration of European peoples continued for the next 75 years. The White population of Southern Rhodesia, or Rhodesia as it was known from 1965, reached a peak of about 300,000 in 1975–76, representing around 8% of the population.

=== Post-independence ===
The country gained its independence as Zimbabwe in April 1980, under a ZANU-PF government led by Robert Mugabe. Following independence, the country's White citizens lost most of their former privileges. A generous social welfare net (including both education and healthcare) that had supported Whites in Rhodesia disappeared almost in an instant. Whites in the artisan, skilled worker and supervisory classes began to experience job competition from Blacks. Indigenisation in the public services displaced many Whites. The result was that White emigration gathered pace. In the ten-year period from 1980 to 1990, approximately two-thirds of the White community left Zimbabwe. About 49% of emigrants left to settle in South Africa, many of whom were Afrikaans speakers, with 29% going to the British Isles; most of the remainder went to Australia, New Zealand, Canada, Hong Kong and the United States. Many of these emigrants, as well as some who remained, continued to identify themselves as Rhodesian. A White Rhodesian or Zimbabwean who is nostalgic for the UDI era is known colloquially as a "Rhodie". These nostalgic "Rhodesians" are also sometimes referred to by the pejorative "Whenwes", coming from the phrase "when we were in Rhodesia" and have been characterised by popular culture as having a strong sense of loss and nostalgia for their former country.

However, many Whites resolved to stay in the new Zimbabwe; only one-third of the White farming community left. An even smaller proportion of White urban business owners and members of the professional classes left. Although White Zimbabweans had lost their advantageous position in society after 1980, the lifting of economic sanctions against Zimbabwe allowed middle class Whites to generate more wealth and opportunities. This pattern of emigration meant that although small in absolute numbers, Zimbabwe's White population remained a high proportion of the upper strata of society. A 1984 article in The Sunday Times Magazine by White Zimbabwean author Peter Godwin described and pictured the life of Zimbabwean White people at a time when their number was just about to fall below 100,000. Godwin wrote that by this time Zimbabwean Whites in the cities generally lived a comfortable lifestyle but had retreated from public life while those in the countryside still remained wary of the new government.

The 1979 Lancaster House Agreement, which was the basis for independence from the United Kingdom, had precluded compulsory land redistribution in favour of subsidised voluntary sale of land by White owners for a period of at least 10 years. The pattern of land ownership established during the Rhodesian state therefore survived for some time after independence. Those White people who were prepared to adapt to the situation they found themselves in were therefore able to continue enjoying a very comfortable existence. In fact, the independence settlement, combined with favourable economic conditions (including the Economic Structural Adjustment Programme), produced a 20-year period of unprecedented prosperity for White Zimbabwean people, and for the White farming community in particular; a new class of "young White millionaires" appeared in the farming sector. These were typically young Zimbabweans who had applied skills learned in agricultural colleges and business schools in Europe. In 1989, Commercial Farmers' Union president John Brown commented, "This is the best government for commercial farmers that this country has ever seen".

The lifting of UN-imposed economic sanctions and the end of the Bush War at the time of independence produced an immediate 'peace dividend'. Renewed access to world capital markets made it possible to finance major new infrastructure developments in transport and schools. One area of economic growth was tourism, catering in particular to visitors from Europe and North America. Many White people found work in this sector. Another area of growth was horticulture, involving the cultivation of flowers, fruits and vegetables, which were air-freighted to market in Europe. Many White farmers were involved in this, and in 2002 it was claimed that 8% of horticultural imports into Europe were sourced in Zimbabwe. The economic migrant element among the White population had departed quickly after independence, leaving behind those White people with deeper roots in the country. The country settled and the White population stabilised.

Chris McGreal, writing in The Observer in April 2008, claimed that before the political and economic situation in Zimbabwe deteriorated, Zimbabwe's White people "... kept their houses and their pools and their servants. The White farmers had it even better. With crop prices soaring they bought boats on Lake Kariba and built air strips on their farms for newly acquired planes. Zimbabwe's Whites reached an implicit understanding with Zanu-PF; they could go on as before, so long as they kept out of politics".

White Zimbabweans with professional skills were readily accepted in the new order. For example, Chris Andersen had been the hardline Rhodesian justice minister, but made a new career for himself as an independent MP and leading attorney in Zimbabwe. In 1998, he defended former President Canaan Banana in the infamous "sodomy trial". At the time of this trial, Andersen spoke out against the attitude of President Mugabe who had described homosexuals as being "worse than dogs and pigs since they are a colonial invention, unknown in African tradition."

John Bredenkamp started his trading business during the UDI era, when he developed expertise in "sanctions busting". He is reported to have arranged the export of Rhodesian tobacco and the import of components (including parts and munitions for the Rhodesian government's force of Hunter jets) in the face of UN trade sanctions. Bredenkamp was able to continue and expand his business after independence, making himself a personal fortune estimated at US$1 billion.

Several White Zimbabwean businessmen, such as Billy Rautenbach, have returned to Zimbabwe after working abroad for some years. Rautenbach has succeeded in extending Zimbabwean minerals sector activity into neighbouring countries such as the Democratic Republic of the Congo. Charles Davy is one of the largest private landowners in Zimbabwe. Davy is reported to own 1,200 km^{2} (460 mi^{2}) of land, including farms at Ripple Creek, Driehoek, Dyer's Ranch and Mlelesi. His property has been almost unaffected by any form of land redistribution, and he denies that this fact has any link to his business relationship with the politician Webster Shamu. Davy has said about Shamu, "I am in partnership with a person who I personally like and get along with". Other views on Shamu are less kind.

The political environment in Zimbabwe has allowed the development of an exploitative business culture, in which some White businessmen have played a prominent role. When Zimbabwe was subject to EU sanctions, arising from its involvement in the DRC from 1998, the government was able to call on sanctions-busting expertise and personnel from the UDI era to provide parts and munitions for its force of Hawk jets. After 25 years of ZANU-PF government, Zimbabwe had become a congenial place for White millionaires of a certain kind to live and do business in.

The Independence constitution contained a provision requiring the Zimbabwean government to honour pension obligations due to former servants of the Rhodesian state. This obligation included payment in foreign currency to pensioners living outside Zimbabwe (almost all White). Pension payments were made until the 1990s, but they then became erratic and stopped altogether in 2003.

Following the land invasions and chaotic political situation in the country, a number of expatriate White farmers and hoteliers from Zimbabwe resettled in neighbouring Zambia, where they were reviving agriculture and developing the local tourism industry. In 2009, the British government commenced a repatriation plan assisting elderly British citizens living in Zimbabwe to resettle in the United Kingdom. Challenges for some of Zimbabwe's remaining White community included being reliant on remittances sent by relatives overseas, the cost of private healthcare and the cost of living.

==== Lancaster Deal and Land reform ====
The Lancaster house agreement took place from 10 September – 15 December 1979 with 47 plenary sessions formally held in which Lord Carrington, Foreign and Commonwealth Secretary of the United Kingdom, chaired the Conference.

The content of Lancaster House Agreement covered the new constitution, pre-independence arrangements, and the terms of ceasefire along with an agreement of a bilateral payment from the UK to the republic of Zimbabwe in aid to the land reforms. The agreement signed under Margaret Thatcher, sought out to aid the oncoming land redistribution as powers shifted from the known Rhodesia to the now known Zimbabwe.

By the mid-1990s, it is thought that around 120,000 White people remained in Zimbabwe. In spite of this small number, the White Zimbabwean minority maintained control of much of the economy through its investment in commercial farms, industry, and tourism. However, an ongoing programme of land reforms (intended to alter the ethnic balance of land ownership) dislodged many White farmers. The level of violence associated with these reforms in some rural areas made the position of the wider White community uncomfortable. Twenty years after independence, there were 21,000 commercial farmers in the country.

In 1997, the British prime minister Tony Blair and his government pulled out of talks to fund the Lancaster House agreements causing a traction. This would lead to the land grabs that were seen soon after. The war veterans felt as if the inability of the UK government to continue its agreement meant they must take a stand. The land grabs formally followed after, in cause of the crumbling relations with the UK government.

The Fast track land reform came to assume a very high profile in Zimbabwe's political life. ZANU politicians sought to revise Rhodesian land apportionment, which they saw as an injustice and pressed for land to be properly dispersed among White and Black ownership. White farmers argued that this served little purpose. Therefore, to their eyes, the problem was really a lack of development, rather than one of land tenure. White farmers would respond to claims that they owned "70% of the best arable land" by stating that what they actually owned was "70% of the best developed arable land", and therefore that the two are entirely different things. Whatever the merits of the arguments, in the post-independence period, the land issue assumed enormous symbolic importance to all concerned. As the euphoria of independence subsided, and as a variety of economic and social problems became evident in the late-1990s, the land issue became a focus for trouble.

The intention was to equally allocate the 4,000 White-owned farms, covering 110,000 km^{2} (42,470 mi^{2}) of mostly prime farmland, among the native Black majority. The means used to implement the programme were ad-hoc, and involved forcible seizure in many cases.

By March 2000, little land had been redistributed as per the land reform laws that were passed in 1979, when the Lancaster House Agreement between Britain and Zimbabwe pledged to initiate a fairer distribution of land between the White minority, which governed Zimbabwe from 1890 to 1979, and the native Black population. However, at this stage, land acquisition could only occur on a voluntary basis. Little land had been redistributed, and frustrated groups of government supporters began seizing White-owned farms. Most of the seizures took place in Nyamandlovu and Inyati.

By mid-2006, only 500 of the original 5,000 White farms were still fully operational. The majority of the White farms that avoided expropriation were in Manicaland and Midlands, where it proved possible to do local deals and form strategic partnerships. However, by early-2007, a number of the seized farms were being leased back to their former White owners (although in reduced size or on a contract basis); it has been claimed to be possible that as many as 1,000 of them could be operational again, in some form.

A University of Zimbabwe sociologist told IWPR journalist Benedict Unendoro that the esprit de corps of the White dominant class in the former Rhodesia prevented the poor White people from becoming a recognisable social group, because of the social assistance provided by the dominant social class on racial grounds. This system broke down after the founding of Zimbabwe, causing the number of poor White people to increase, especially after 2000, when the confiscation of White-owned farms took its toll. As rich White land owners emigrated or fended for themselves financially, their White employees, who mainly worked as supervisors of Black labour, found themselves destitute on the streets of cities like Harare, with many found begging around urban centres like Eastlea. The land confiscated from White owners was redistributed to Black peasant farmers and smallholders, acquired by commercial land companies, or persons connected to the government.

Sympathisers of the expropriated White farmers claimed that lack of professional management skills among the new landholders resulted in a dramatic decline in Zimbabwe's agricultural production. In an effort to boost their own agricultural output, neighbouring countries, including Mozambique and Zambia, offered land and other incentives to entice Zimbabwe's White farmers to emigrate.

By 2008, an estimated one in ten out of 5,000 White farmers remained on their original farmland; many of these continued to face intimidation. By June 2008, The Daily Telegraph reported that 280 White farmers remained in Zimbabwe, and all of their farms were "invade[d]". On the day of Mugabe's inauguration as president on 28 June 2008, several White farmers who had protested the seizure of farm land were beaten and burned by his supporters.

In 2017, new President Emmerson Mnangagwa's inaugural speech promised to pay compensation to the White farmers whose land was seized during the land reform programme. Rob Smart became the first White farmer whose land was returned within a month after President Mnangagwa was sworn in to office; he returned to his farm in Manicaland province by military escort. During the World Economic Forum 2018 in Davos, Mnangagwa also stated that his new government believes thinking about racial lines in farming and land ownership is "outdated", and should be a "philosophy of the past." There were thought to be around 300-400 White farmers left in the country, down from 4,000 prior to Mugabe's land reforms eighteen years prior. Hundreds of White farmers returned to Zimbabwe following a mellowing of government restrictions on White Zimbabweans owning land, with many of the returning White farmers forming joint ventures with Black farmowners.

Ahead of the 2018 general election, Mnangagwa held a public meeting for an audience of White Zimbabweans in Borrowdale, Harare. He conceded that many White farms seized under the land reform programme had gone to government officials, soldiers and tribal chiefs who knew little about farming, and asked Whites to work with his government. The speech both drew mixed responses among opposition politicians, but was seen by commentators as a shift from Mugabe's policies and an attempt to court White voters.

By September 2023, there were thought to be as many as 900 White-run commercial farms in the country. The farmers were not usually working their own land, but were renting in joint ventures from Black farmers given confiscated White-owned land. Government compensation payments to White farmers who were evicted under Mugabe began in 2025. Payments cover improvements which they made on the land, rather than the land itself. In 2026, agriculture minister Anxious Masuka said that 840 seized properties previously held by Black farmers and around 400 owned by White farmers were earmarked for return. The government committed to return 67 farms owned by nationals of Denmark, Germany, the Netherlands and Switzerland.

== Discrimination ==
Since the 2000s, there has been a surge in violence against Zimbabwe's White population. The main targets of this violence has often been White farmers, with both human rights groups and journalists documenting reports of White Zimbabwean farmers and their families being victims of murder, threats of violence, property destruction and forced evictions. Violent incidents and racially motivated attacks against Whites have also been reported in cities and towns.

Much of the violence against White Zimbabwean farmers was initiated after a proposal on fast-tracking land reform policies was put forward by Mugabe's government during the late 1990s and early 2000s. This led to subsequent protests organised by the pro-Mugabe Zimbabwe National Liberation War Veterans Association (ZNLWVA) calling for land transfers to Black Zimbabwean war veterans which spilled into invasions of White-owned farms and physical attacks on White farmers. Black Zimbabwean militant groups and mobs began to systematically harass White farmers whilst assaulting and sometimes killing Black Zimbabwean agricultural workers on their properties. In 2000, militants shot dead a White farmer David Stevens at his home in the first documented case of a murder since the land reform programme was pushed by Zimbabwe's government. In 2001, it was reported that nine White farmers had been killed and in September of that year the Commercial Farmers' Union said that least 829 "violent or hostile" incidents had taken place on commercial farms. In August 2001, Zimbabwe police reported that a violent mob had swept through Chinhoyi assaulting and injuring White Zimbabweans in the street and in a supermarket.

In 2002, Human Rights Watch documented that at least seven White Zimbabwean farmers had been killed along with Black farm workers.

In April 2008, a fresh round of invasions of White owned farms was reported with White farmers allegedly being forced out of their homes with threats of punishment. Hendrik Olivier, the then director of the Commercial Farmers Union accused both the Zimbabwean police of being complicit in allowing the attacks to happen and the state owned Zimbabwe Broadcasting Corporation of encouraging violence against White farmers.

In June 2008, a British-born farmer, Ben Freeth, who had published several articles and letters in the British press allegeding hostility against White farmers, and his in-laws, Mike and Angela Campbell, were abducted and found badly beaten. Campbell, speaking from hospital in Harare, vowed to continue with his legal fight for his farm. In November 2008, a SADC tribunal ruled that the Zimbabwean government had racially discriminated against Campbell, denied him legal redress, and prevented him from defending his farm.

On 18 September 2010, droves of White Zimbabweans were chased away and prevented from participating in the constitutional outreach programme in Harare during a weekend, in which violence and confusion marred the process, with similar incidents having occurred in the Harare suburb of Graniteside. In Mount Pleasant, White families were subjected to a torrent of abuse by suspected ZANU-PF supporters, who later drove them away and shouted racial slurs.

After the beating to death of a prominent White farmer in September 2011 near Harare, the head of the Commercial Farmers' Union Charles Taffs decried the attack, saying that its White members continued to be targeted with violence without protection from the government. The Commercial Farmers' Union also rejected a report from the police which claimed the farmer was killed during a robbery and argued it was part of a recent pattern of political violence and that the authorities were deliberately failing to arrest and prosecute those behind the attacks.

In 2012, Genocide Watch declared that the violence against Whites in Zimbabwe was a stage 5 (of 10) case of genocide.

Violence and intimidation against the White community has also spilled into suburban and urban districts and Whites have been the target of a degrading campaign by the Zimbabwean State media throughout the 2000s. Several state newspapers referred to White Zimbabweans as "Britain's Children" and "settlers and colonialists". In 2006, Several White Zimbabweans living in the affluent Harare suburb of Borrowdale were evicted from their homes because of their proximity to Mugabe's new home in the area. In April 2007, it was reported that 100 mostly White youths were arrested during a police paramilitary raid at Borrowdale's Glow nightclub, before being transported in two police buses and detained in the downtown central police station. In a statement, the Zimbabwean police said that the raid was part of a crackdown on underage drinking in bars and beer halls, although eyewitnesses reported that several of the youths were beaten by police while others among the detainees said they witnessed White females being separated into different groups where they were threatened with rifles, slapped by police officers and denied phone calls to relatives after the raid.

In September 2014, Mugabe publicly declared that all White Zimbabweans should "go back to England", and urged Black Zimbabweans not to lease agricultural land to White farmers.

In August 2017, Mugabe declared that people who had murdered White farmers would not face prosecution. That same year, he also encouraged Zimbabwean youths at a government rally to forcibly occupy White farms in Mashonaland East and drive the farmers away.

Prominent White Zimbabwean opposition politicians such as Roy Bennett and David Coltart have been targets of racially motivated threats and electoral violence.

President Emmerson Mnangagwa softened the government's attitude to White Zimbabweans and attempted to court support among the White community. After coming to power, Mnangagwa said that he would financially compensate White farmers whose land had been confiscated by the state. He rejected any further pursuit of land reform along racial lines, describing it as an "outdated" practice. Compensation payments began in 2025. In 2026, the government committed to returning around 840 seized properties previously held by Black farmers and around 400 owned by White farmers.

== Population changes ==
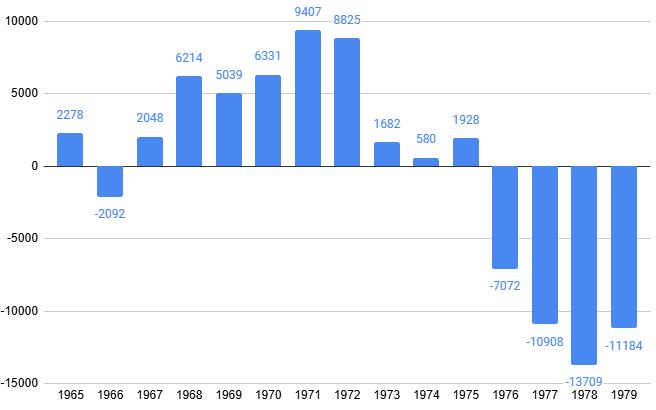
Net migration of White people from Rhodesia between 1965 and 1979

Emigration after the country gained internationally recognised independence as Zimbabwe in 1980 resulted in a declining White population: estimated at 220,000 in 1980; 70,000 in 2000; and 30,000 in 2012. However, by 2023, the White population had increased following the government easing restrictions regarding White ownership of farmland. Many formerly dispossessed White farmers have formed joint ventures with Black landowners. White ministers in the Zimbabwean Government have included Kirsty Coventry, Joshua Sacco and Vangelis Haritatos. In 2023, David Coltart was elected as Mayor of Bulawayo.

=== Decline ===
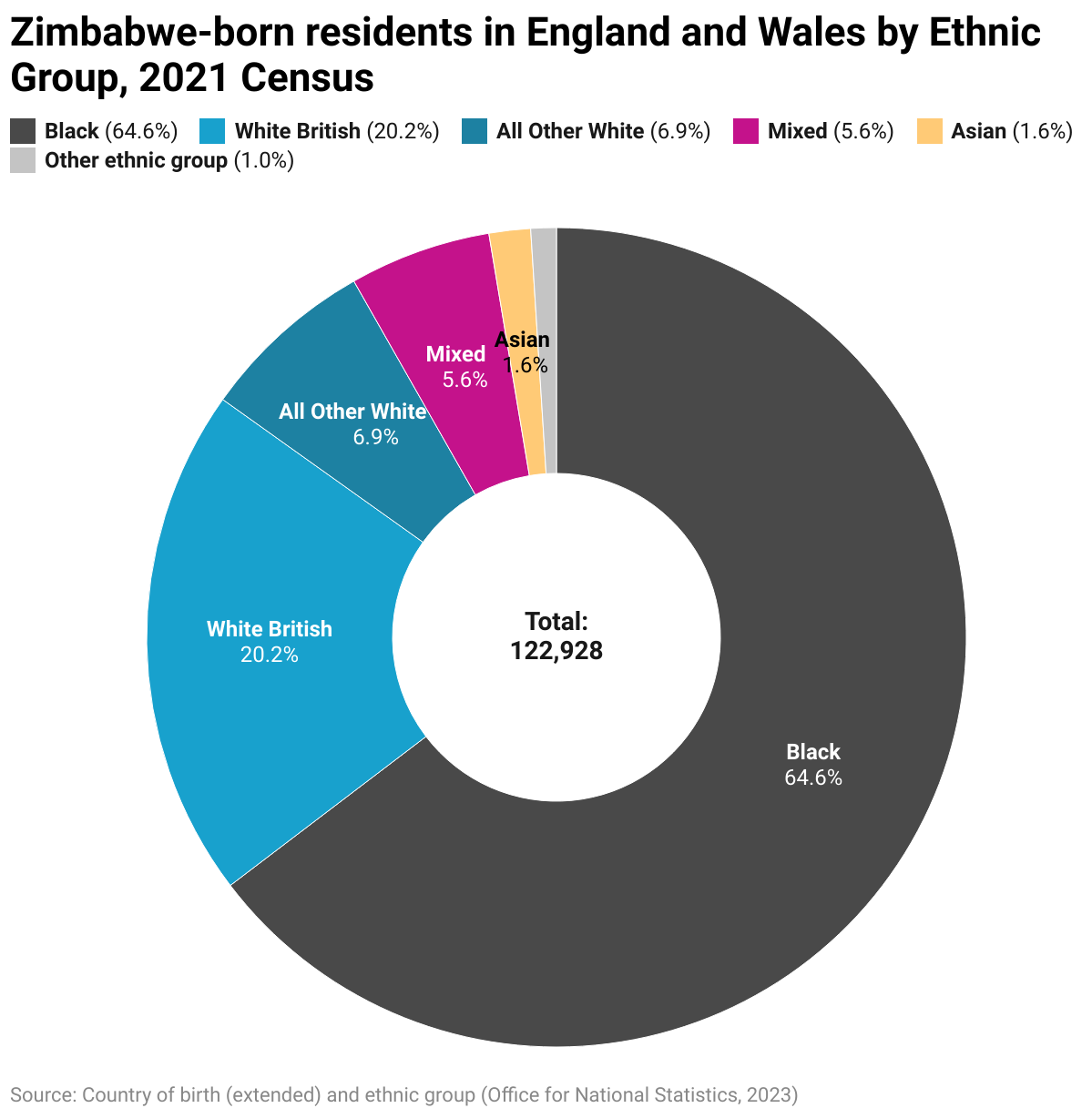
According to the 2021 census, 27.1% of immigrants from Zimbabwe in England and Wales are Whites.

In November 1965, in order to avoid the introduction of Black majority rule (commonly referred to at the time as the Wind of Change), the Government of what was then the self-governing colony of Southern Rhodesia issued the Unilateral Declaration of Independence (UDI), upon which the country became the de facto independent – albeit unrecognised — state of Rhodesia.

As was the case in most European colonies, White settlers took a privileged position in all areas of society. Extensive areas of prime farmland were owned by Whites. Senior positions in the public services were reserved for Whites, and Whites working in manual occupations enjoyed legal protection against job competition from Black Africans. As time passed, this situation became increasingly unwelcome to the majority ethnic groups within the country and also to wide sections of international opinion, leading to the Rhodesian Bush War and eventually the Lancaster House Agreement in 1979.

After the country's reconstitution as the Republic of Zimbabwe in 1980, White Zimbabweans had to adjust to being an ethnic minority in a country with a Black majority government. Although a significant number of White Zimbabweans remained, many of them emigrated in the early-1980s, both in fear for their lives and an uncertain future. Political unrest and the seizure of many White-owned commercial farms resulted in a further exodus of White Zimbabweans commencing in 1999. The 2002 census recorded 46,743 White Zimbabweans living in Zimbabwe. More than 10,000 were elderly and fewer than 9,000 were under the age of 15.

At the time of Zimbabwean independence in 1980, it was estimated that around 38% of White Zimbabweans were UK-born, with slightly fewer born in Rhodesia, and around 20% from elsewhere in Africa. The White population of that era contained a large transient element, and many White people might better be considered foreign migrants than settlers. Between 1960 and 1979, White emigration to Rhodesia was around 180,000, while White emigration overseas was 202,000 (with an average White population of around 240,000). White emigration accelerated as independence approached. In October 1978 the net White emigration of 1,582 was the highest recorded number of departures since Rhodesia declared its UDI in 1965. According to official government statistics, 1,834 Whites emigrated and 252 White immigrants arrived. In the first nine months of 1978, 11,241 Whites emigrated. In an attempt to stem emigration, the Rhodesian government allowed each departing family to only take up to $1,400 out of the country.

=== Resurgence ===
After Mugabe was removed as President and replaced by Emmerson Mnangagwa, some White Zimbabweans returned. By September 2023, there were thought to be as many as 900 farms run by Whites, most of them in joint ventures with Blacks who had been given the properties after government confiscation. In 2025, the ruling party ZANU-PF boasted that significant numbers of Whites were returning to the country; they constituted the largest group of returning Zimbabweans.

== Demographics ==
White population of Zimbabwe by province, 2012
Province	Province population	White population	Percent White	Urban population	Rural population
Bulawayo	653,337	4,926	0.75%	4,926	0
Harare	2,123,132	15,537	0.73%	15,481	56
Manicaland	1,752,698	1,256	0.07%	602	654
Mashonaland Central	1,152,520	491	0.04%	78	413
Mashonaland East	1,344,955	1,201	0.09%	380	821
Mashonaland West	1,501,656	1,889	0.13%	1,103	786
Masvingo	1,485,090	719	0.05%	257	462
Matabeleland North	749,017	1,343	0.18%	827	516
Matabeleland South	683,893	454	0.07%	85	369
Midlands	1,614,941	916	0.06%	619	297
Total	13,061,239	28,732	0.22%	24,358	4,374

== Communities ==
In addition to the dominant Anglo-Celtic population, other White communities exist in Zimbabwe.

=== Afrikaner ===
The first wave of Afrikaners arrived in ox wagons in 1893, brought to the country at the time by the pioneer Duncan Moodie. The Afrikaners that followed mostly settled on farms in the subtropical lowlands of the southeast, and on the high central and northwestern plains known for its cattle ranching. It is estimated that the community peaked in the late 1960s, numbering some 25,000. P. K. van der Byl, an Afrikaner, served as Rhodesia's Minister of Foreign Affairs (1974–1979). Thousands returned to South Africa after independence in Zimbabwe in 1980; however, as many as 15,000 remained four years later in 1984. They were sometimes disparaged by their Anglo-Saxon counterparts in the country, who referred to them as "japies", "hairy-backs", "rock spiders" and "ropes". Until the end of the Second World War, "the race problem" in Southern Rhodesia referred exclusively to Afrikaner and English-speaking rivalries. However, Afrikaners in the country did not push for the most radical demands of Afrikaner nationalism, including the absolute rejection of empire. "Anti-Dutch" sentiment contributed to White Rhodesia's rejection of union with South Africa in the 1922 referendum, as well as a fear that union would bring a wave of Afrikaner "poor Whites" to the country. Some Afrikaners came to the country to escape the National Party politics, and they looked to Southern Rhodesia, not to become closer to Britain, but to forge a White African identity with English-speaking Whites that was free of the Afrikaner supremacy in South Africa.

=== Jewish ===
The earlier wave of Jewish immigration consisted of Ashkenazi Jews from Russia and Lithuania. An active Jewish community with a synagogue has existed in Salisbury (now Harare) since 1894. In the 1930s, a wave of Sephardi Jews arrived from Rhodes, the Greek island. German Jews fleeing persecution in the Third Reich also settled in the country. A number of Jews arrived from the Belgian Congo, escaping the civil war engulfing the newly independent country. The Jewish community reached a peak of 7,060 to 7, 500 between 1961 and the early 1970s. There were three active synagogues in Salisbury (now Harare), one in Bulawayo and a plethora of Jewish community centers, sports clubs, primary schools, youth movements and other organizations, such as the Chevra Kadisha (Jewish burial society). Smaller Jewish communities also existed in Gatooma, Gwelo and Que Que. There are currently two active synagogues in the country, both are in Harare: the Ashkenazi synagogue and the Sephardi synagogue. As congregation numbers have depleted, both communities combine minyanim on Shabbat. Two Jewish primary schools continue to operate, with Sharon School in Harare, and Carmel in Bulawayo. With the local Jewish community decreasing in size, most of the students at the schools are not Jewish, however.

=== Greek ===
The Greek Community in Zimbabwe peaked at between 13,000 and 15,000 people in 1972, but has decreased significantly to around 1,000 Greeks or people of Greek origin. The Greek Cypriot community in Zimbabwe is slightly larger, with 1,200 Cypriots continuing to live in the country. The Greeks and Cypriots were mostly known for running restaurants and small businesses in the country. There are some significant Greek and Cypriot business owners and landowners, with the majority of the Hellenic community employed in trade professions or involved in bakery operations. Hellenic Academy, an independent Greek high school, was established in Harare in 2008. The Holy Archdiocese of Zimbabwe and Southern Africa is under the jurisdiction of the Patriarchate of Alexandria.

=== Italian ===
Italians came to Zimbabwe as early as 1906, when they formed a settlement named Sinoa in today's Chinhoyi.

=== Portuguese ===
Portuguese migrants came from Portuguese Mozambique to work in the building trade, with later waves coming from newly independent Angola and Mozambique.

== Culture, language and identity ==
Like other White diaspora in Africa who inherited European cultural dynamics from early settlers, many English-speaking White Rhodesians and Zimbabweans inherited social attitudes and mannerisms from British culture before developing their own distinct image and society with each generation. Post-World War II Rhodesian White settlers were considered different in character from earlier Rhodesian settlers and those from other British colonies. In Kenya, settlers were perceived to be drawn from "the officer class" and from the British landowning class. By contrast, settlers in Rhodesia after the Second World War were perceived as being drawn from lower social strata and were treated accordingly by the British authorities. As White Zimbabwean author Peter Godwin wrote in The Guardian, "Foreign Office mandarins dismissed Rhodesians as lower middle class, no more than provincial clerks and artisans, the lowly NCOs of empire."

White Zimbabweans also developed a form of Zimbabwean English dialect and accent over time. Traditionally, this was influenced by British English with a smaller degree of Afrikaans influence, but White Zimbabweans have also adopted and integrated phrases and slang from native Bantu Shona and Ndebele languages into parlance. British sociolinguistics scholar Peter Trudgill wrote that the White Rhodesian and later Zimbabwean accent evolved with the inclusion of terms and dialects used by both Black and White communities. Citing his own family as an example, Peter Godwin described the White Zimbabwean accent as part of "a tiny subset of Anglo African accents" which blends influence from Afrikaans and received pronunciation British-English.

=== Arts and entertainment ===
Several cultural organisations existed during White-minority rule that mainly served the interests of the community. These included The National Gallery, The National Arts Foundation and the Salisbury Arts Council.

==== Fiction ====
Artistic expression often portrays "the melancholy White exile" from Zimbabwe who secretly longs to return home.

Gertrude Page's Rhodesia novels were all written between the years 1907 and 1922. These novels included Love in the Wilderness (1907), The Edge O' Beyond (1908) and The Pathway (1914). In The Rhodesian (1914), Page writes admiringly of agricultural productivity and colonial settlement in her "empty" Rhodesian landscapes: "The Valley of Ruins no longer lies alone and unheeded in the sunlight; and no longer do the hills look down upon rich plains left solely to ... idle pleasures." In the novel she imagines Cecil Rhodes as "enslaved and enfolded" by the landscape, an "enchantress who bound men's souls for ever", and wonders whether Rhodesia had been "wife and child" to him, in his solitude, thus implying that Page imagines Rhodes as a husband and father to the nation. Cynthia Stockley, the South African-born novelist, lived in Rhodesia and set several of her novels there such as Virginia of the Rhodesians (1903) and The Claw (1911). As with Page, Stockley's heroes are heavily impacted by the powerful African landscape: "Africa has kissed him on the mouth and he will not leave her." In The Claw, she wrote of the country's empty landscapes that allowed for both personal freedom and expansion of the soul: "The world seemed filled with gracious dimness and made up of illimitable space. An indescribable feeling of happy freedom filled my heart. It seemed to me that the lungs of my soul drew breath and expanded as they had never done in any land before." Although Stockley shows a commitment to Rhodesian patriotism in her novels, her nationalism shifted towards Union with South Africa in Tagati (1930).

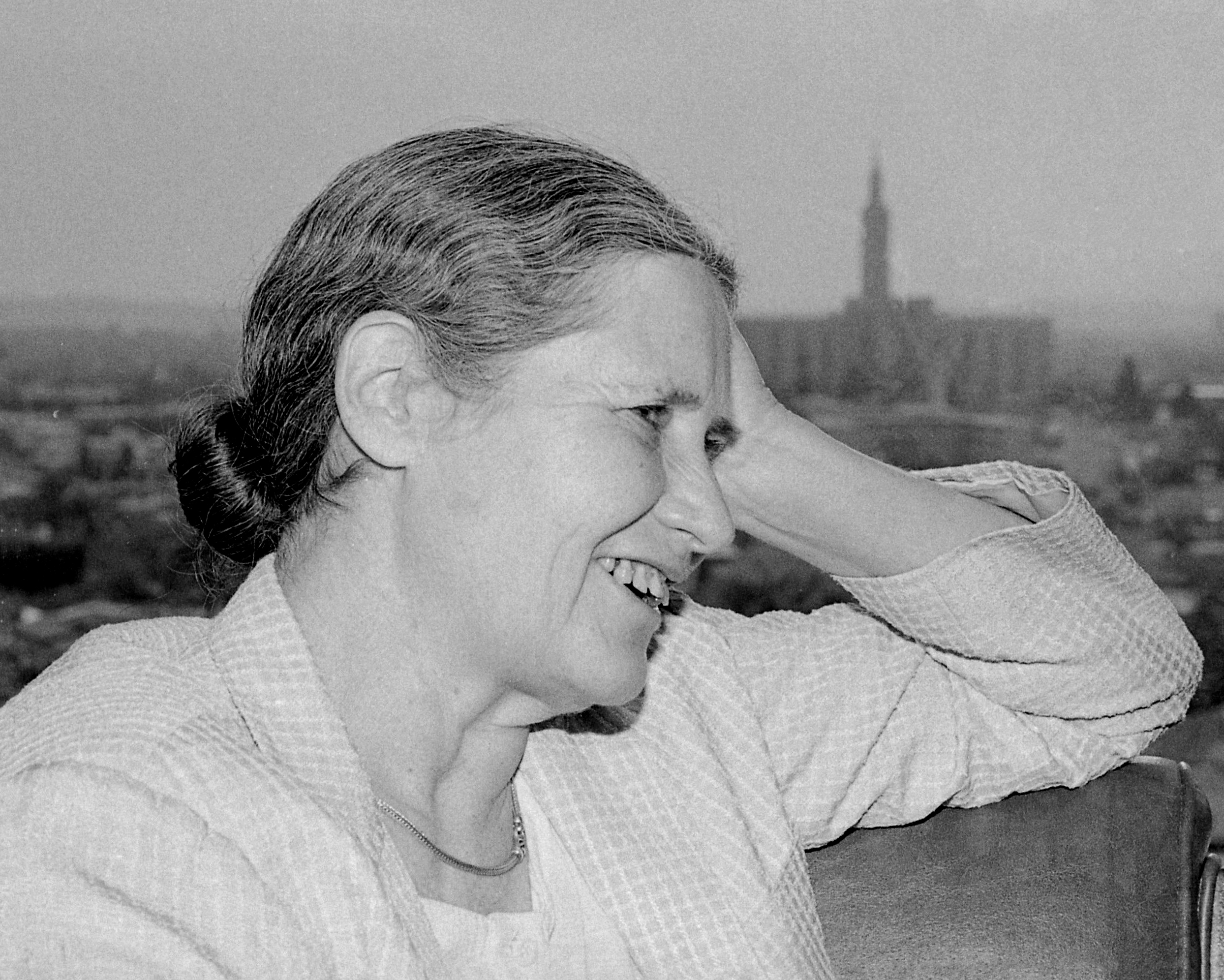
Author Doris Lessing in 1984

Doris Lessing (1919–2013) was awarded the 2007 Nobel Prize in Literature, becoming the second White African woman to win a Nobel Prize, after South Africa's Nadine Gordimer in 1991. Her earlier poetry was published in the regular publication, New Rhodesia (1938–1954), which published lively commentary affairs. Her debut novel, The Grass Is Singing (1950), about a relationship between a White woman and a Black man, is set in Southern Rhodesia of the late 1940s. The novel begins with a newspaper announcement of a White woman's murder on the veld: "The newspaper did not say much. People all over the country must have glanced at the paragraph with its sensational heading and felt a little spurt of anger mingled with what was almost satisfaction, as if some belief had been confirmed, as if something had happened which could only have been expected. When natives steal, murder or rape, that is the feeling White people have."

A number of White writers in the country had their poetry published by the Poetry Society of Rhodesia (founded in 1950). In 1952, the society's journal appeared as the Poetry Review Salisbury, before becoming Rhodesian Poetry. The South African writer Alan Paton was a chairman of the society in the 1970s. It appeared sometimes annually and sometimes biennially until independence in 1980. In the 1970s, it published new material as well as well-received poetry that had been published elsewhere in the country in the preceding two years. Many of these poems came from Two Tone, a quarterly publication that aimed to publish both Black and White writers. The founders, Phillipa Berlyn and Olive Robertson, were acolytes of the Rhodesia Front. Berlyn held the belief that an independent Rhodesia would need to accommodate both Black and White citizens, and her quarterly could be an outlet where poets from different races could listen to one another. Once the Rhodesian Bush War came to the forefront in 1972 and emigration increased, White poets became less confident in expressing their own identity, and more frequently the poems appearing in Two Tone and Rhodesian Poetry were about the experiences of war. John Eppel was conscripted repeatedly during the final years of the war and in his poem "Spoils of War", he recalls looking at the bodies of guerrillas killed during a contact:

Sarge tells me to save my tears
for the civilians these gooks have slaughtered.
But I am not thinking of them, and I
cannot explain that I am being purged
of my Rhodesianism. That ugly
word with its jagged edge is opening
me. . . . I move to the past tense.

Colin Style, a contributor to both Two Tone and Rhodesia Poetry, was awarded the Ingrid Jonker Prize for best published collection in English in Southern Africa, 1977 with Baobab Street (1977). He wrote with unashamed nostalgia for his native country's veld, its disappearance among new building developments and for Rhodesia itself. In "The Cemetery," the life and culture of a Rhodesia that will become a memory are presented as detached from the present as a San rock painting:

The soil is fine:
it mingles with my sweat and stains red in my sandal,
muddy itching ochre seeping into mind
while in their crevices and caves the rock-imprinted impala
restlessly stir.

N. H. Brettell was also a significant White poet in the country since publishing Bronze Frieze: Poems Mostly Rhodesian (1950). In a 1978 academic essay on Rhodesian poetry, Graham Robin wrote that "Brettell puts into words the halting stupefaction of the exile in such a new and strange land. At last Rhodesia has a poet possessed by his country; but amazed, almost reluctantly possessed." Brettell also befriended the poet, short story writer and Anglican priest, Arthur Shearly Cripps. Cripps was critical of the British South Africa Company and settler rule. He was the most widely represented writer in Rhodesian Verse, 1888–1938, the first anthology of Rhodesian poetry (edited by John Snelling). In the post-war period and in his final years, Cripps published poetry in Labour Front, which provided a platform for White radicalism. Left-leaning White writers also wrote for the Central African Examiner (1957–1965), where writers engaged with race, statehood and universal suffrage. The poetry was often satiric, subverting the political ideology and claims of the federal and Southern Rhodesian establishment. The publication ceased publication in 1965 due to the censorship laws put in place in the wake of Rhodesia's Unilateral Declaration of Independence. Hundreds of mostly partisan novels were also published in the UDI era of the 1960s and 1970s by White writers in the country supporting the Smith government.

In the final years of UDI Rhodesia, Rhodesian poetry that encompassed the work of both Black and White writers was seen as inappropriate by many Black writers. In 1978, Kizito Muchemwa edited Zimbabwean Poetry in English: An Anthology, a collection that only contained the work of Black writers. The use of Zimbabwean rather than Rhodesian as a term of identity was regarded as subversive at the time.

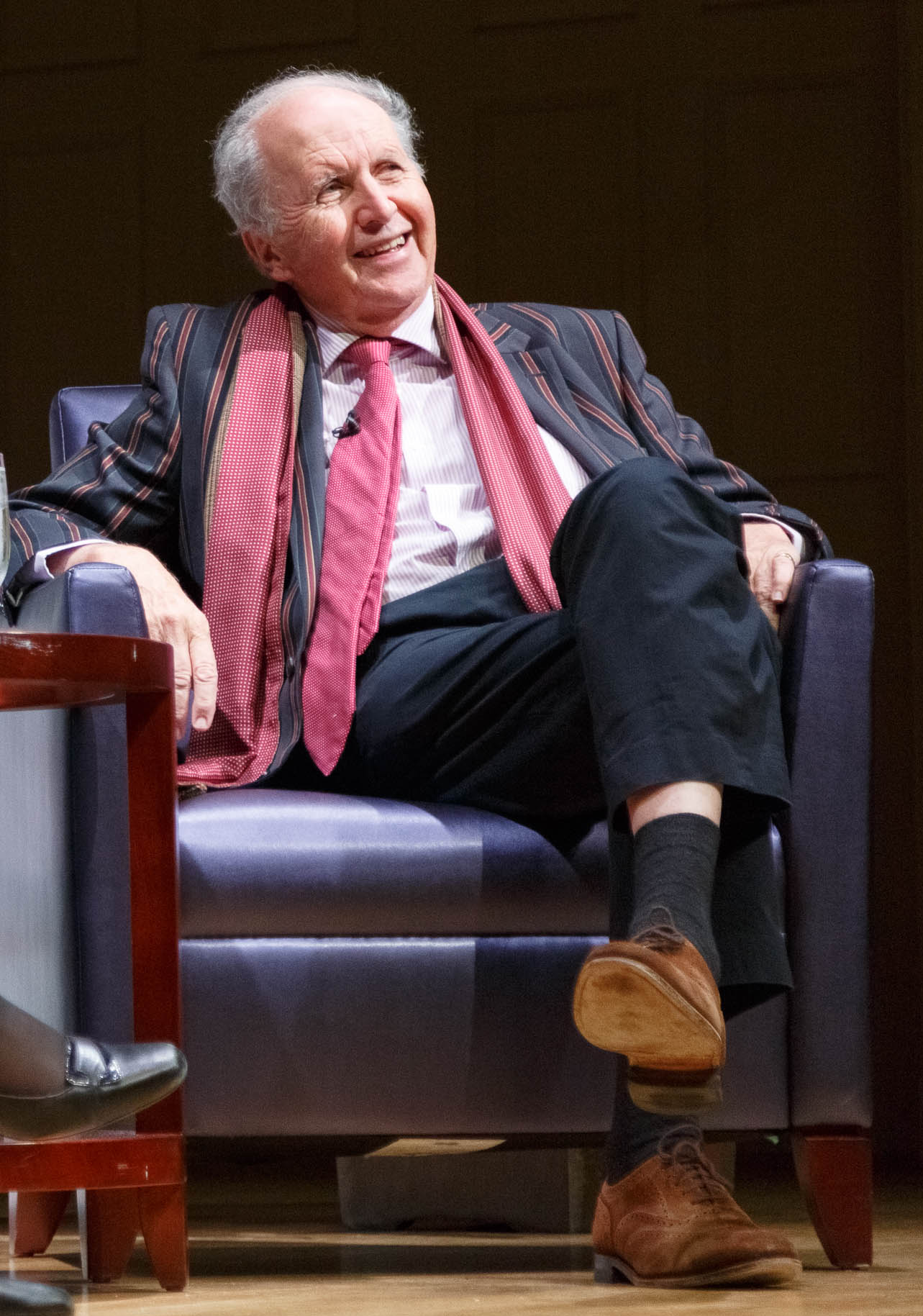
Writer Alexander McCall Smith

Lauren Liebenberg centred her debut novel, The Voluptuous Delights of Peanut Butter and Jam, on a Rhodesian farm in 1978. It was nominated for the Orange Prize for Fiction in 2008. Liebenberg drew upon some of her own experiences as a child growing up in war-torn Rhodesia. Alexander McCall Smith, who was born and brought up in Southern Rhodesia, has also enjoyed notable success. In particular, he is known as the creator of the Africa-inspired series The No. 1 Ladies' Detective Agency, set in neighbouring Botswana.

==== Non-fiction ====
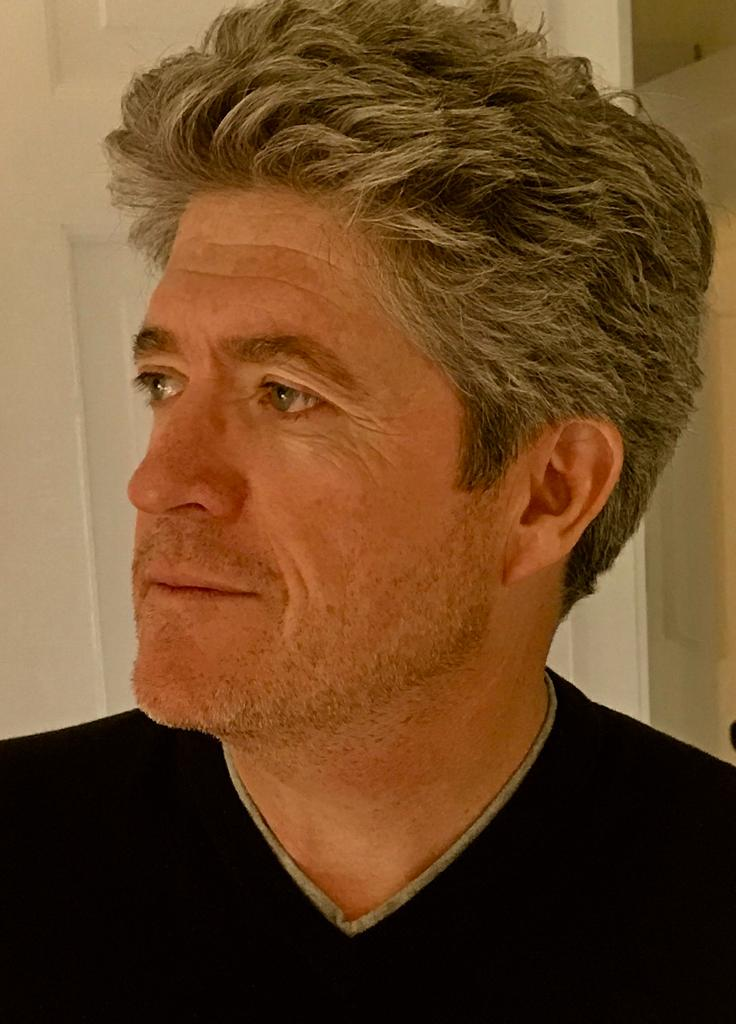
Writer Peter Godwin

Uncritical accounts of White-minority rule in the country formed part of the teaching syllabi recommended by the Rhodesian Ministry of Education in the 1960s. White schoolchildren read A Child's History of Rhodesia (1925) by Myfanwy Williams and First Steps in Civilising Rhodesia (1940) by Jeannie M. Boogie.

Peter Godwin, who was born in Salisbury (now Harare) in 1957 to English and Polish parents, has written several books with a Zimbabwean background, including Rhodesians Never Die (1984), Mukiwa: A White Boy in Africa (1996), When a Crocodile Eats the Sun (2007) and The Fear: Robert Mugabe and the Martyrdom of Zimbabwe (2011). The theme of these books is the impact of political change in Zimbabwe on the country's White community. His writing has been influenced by the death of one of his sisters in a "friendly fire" incident during the Bush War in the 1970s. Alexandra Fuller wrote of her childhood in the 1970s on a Rhodesian farm in the memoir Don't Let's Go to the Dogs Tonight (2002). For Fuller, the land is gendered female: "In Rhodesia we are born and then the umbilical cord of each child is sewn straight from the mother into the ground, where it takes root and grows. Pulling away from the ground causes death by suffocation, starvation. That's what the people of this land believe."

Graham Boynton, who was raised in Bulawayo, wrote Last Days in Cloud Cuckooland (1997), covering the twilight years of White rule in southern Africa and carried extensive interviews with the two major White political protagonists, Ian Smith and Sir Garfield Todd. The late Heidi Holland met Robert Mugabe at a secret dinner, and in 2007 she was one of the few White journalists to be granted an in-depth interview with the president. Holland wrote about her experiences with Mugabe in Dinner with Mugabe (2008). Douglas Rogers chronicled his parents' struggle to hold onto their game farm and backpackers resort in The Last Resort (2009). Lauren St John, best known for her children's novels, wrote the memoir, Rainbow's End: A Memoir of Childhood, War and an African Farm. St John writes about her childhood home in then Rhodesia, Rainbow's End, where the previous family had been murdered. Her account explores growing up during the civil war in the 1970s and on life in a newly independent Zimbabwe.

=== Music ===
"God Save the Queen" was dropped as the national anthem when Rhodesia became a republic in 1970. In 1974, "Ode to Joy" from Beethoven's Ninth Symphony became the tune for the new national anthem, "Rise, O Voices of Rhodesia". Mary Bloom, a local woman provided the lyrics for the anthem. Patriotic folk songs were particularly popular amongst the White community during the Rhodesian Bush War. A leading musical figure was Clem Tholet, who married Ian Smith's stepdaughter Jean Smith in 1967. Tholet became famous for patriotic anthems such as "Rhodesians Never Die", and he enjoyed gold status (for over 60,000 sales) with his first album, Songs of Love & War, recorded at Shed Studios. Another popular folk singer was Northern Rhodesian-born John Edmond, a former soldier of the (Southern) Rhodesian Army, who also enjoyed considerable success during the Rhodesian Bush War. He had hits with patriotic folk songs such as "The U.D.I. Song" from his popular Troopiesongs album. Rhodesian Premier Ian Smith was criticised for singing the Afrikaans folk song, "Bobbe jaan Klim die Berg" ("The Baboon Climbs the Mountain") at an election rally in 1970 in Salisbury (Harare).

Simon Attwell is a Zimbabwean band member of the popular South African group Freshlyground, playing the flute, mbira, sax, and harmonica. Freshlyground combines both African and European musical traditions, and they participated in the 2008 HIFA. Gemma Griffifths, a singer and Harare native based in Cape Town, has been profiled by the BBC.

Concert pianist Manuel Bagorro is the founder and artistic director of Harare International Festival of the Arts. First held in 1999, the Festival was most recently held in April 2008, and was successful in attracting attention to the arts in Zimbabwe at a difficult time.

The jazz composer, bandleader, and trombonist Mike Gibbs was born in Salisbury, Southern Rhodesia. Other internationally successful artists born there include the Royal Ballet prima ballerina Dame Merle Park and actress Susan Burnet, whose grandfather was one of the country's first White settlers.

=== Performing arts ===
Theatre was immensely popular across African colonies amongst bourgeoise White residents, often seeking the culture of European metropoles. The construction of larger theatres boomed in the twentieth century in colonies most populated by White people, such as Kenya, Southern Rhodesia and the copper belt of Northern Rhodesia. 'Little theatres' were also popular; often, they were part of large sporting venues, gymkhana and turf clubs. In 1910, one author remarked on the popularity of theatre amongst Southern Rhodesia's White population: "the local population must have spent a considerable amount on theatre seats. Fifteen professional companies went on tour that year." Theatres in Southern African colonies were usually situated next to a railway line, and the premier European dramatic performance in then Southern Rhodesia took place in the southern region of Bulawayo. The development of rail infrastructure allowed the involvement of entertainers from neighbouring South Africa.

The National Theatre Organisation, formerly The National Theatre Foundation, focussed on European productions. These included plays such as A Midsummer Night's Dream and No Sex Please, We're British.

=== Broadcasting ===
In 1960, television was introduced into the then Southern Rhodesia, as Rhodesia Television. It was the first such service in the region, as South Africa did not introduce television until 1976, due to the potential ideological conflicts that it posed. The Rhodesian Broadcasting Corporation took over from Rhodesia Television (RTV) as RBCTV in 1976. As previously, this was a commercial service carrying advertising, although there was also a television licence fee. Television reception was confined mainly to the large cities, and the majority of television personalities and viewers were from the White minority. Both RTV and RBC used the BBC as a model, in that a government department was not responsible for it, but instead, a board of governors (selected by Ian Smith) were. Popular television shows included Kwizzkids, Frankly Partridge and Music Time. Possibly the best-known Director of the RBC was Dr. Harvey Ward. Prior to the introduction of television, RBC had developed a successful radio network, which continued. By 1978, three top White executives had fled overseas, including Dr. Ward, of whom it was said "probably more than any other person, became identified with the right-wing bias on Rhodesia's radio and TV networks." The RBC was later succeeded by the Zimbabwe Rhodesia Corporation, and later in its present form as the Zimbabwe Broadcasting Corporation. The character Horace Von Khute from the British television series Fonejacker is a Rhodesian who works for the police in intercepting a Ugandan bank scammer.

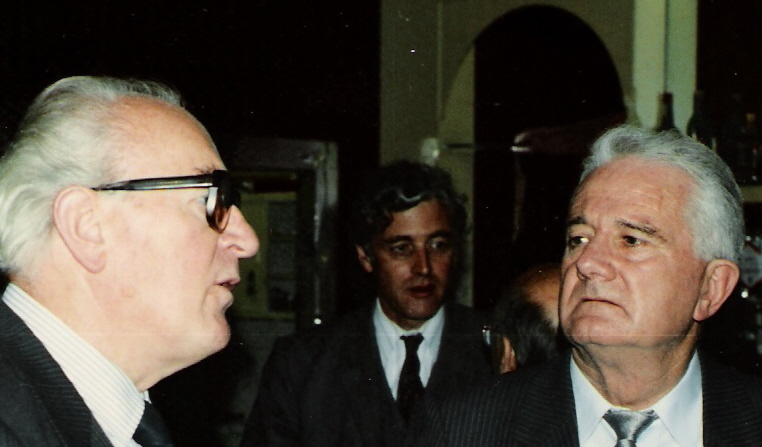
Harvey Ward, right, in conversation with Zygmunt Szkopiak

Georgina Godwin, sister of author Peter Godwin, became a well-known broadcast journalist in Zimbabwe, presenting a breakfast television show and hosting a prime time radio show on the state broadcaster, Zimbabwe Broadcasting Corporation until her departure from the country in 2001. She was also a founder of SW Radio Africa, a station based in London with the purpose of broadcasting independently of Zimbabwean state interference. She is books editor for Monocle Radio and presenter of the in-depth author interview show Meet the Writers on the station.

=== Cinema ===
Doris Lessing's Southern Rhodesia novel The Grass is Singing was adapted into a film by the White Zimbabwean director, Michael Raeburn and released in 1980. Despite the majority of the original novel taking place in then Southern Rhodesia and earlier scenes in South Africa, the adaptation was filmed in Zambia and Sweden. The film starred Karen Black and John Thaw as the poverty-stricken Ehite farming couple Mary and Dick Turner, and John Kani as the Black houseboy and love-interest of Mary Turner. The film is also known asGräset Sjunger (Swedish) and Killing Heat.

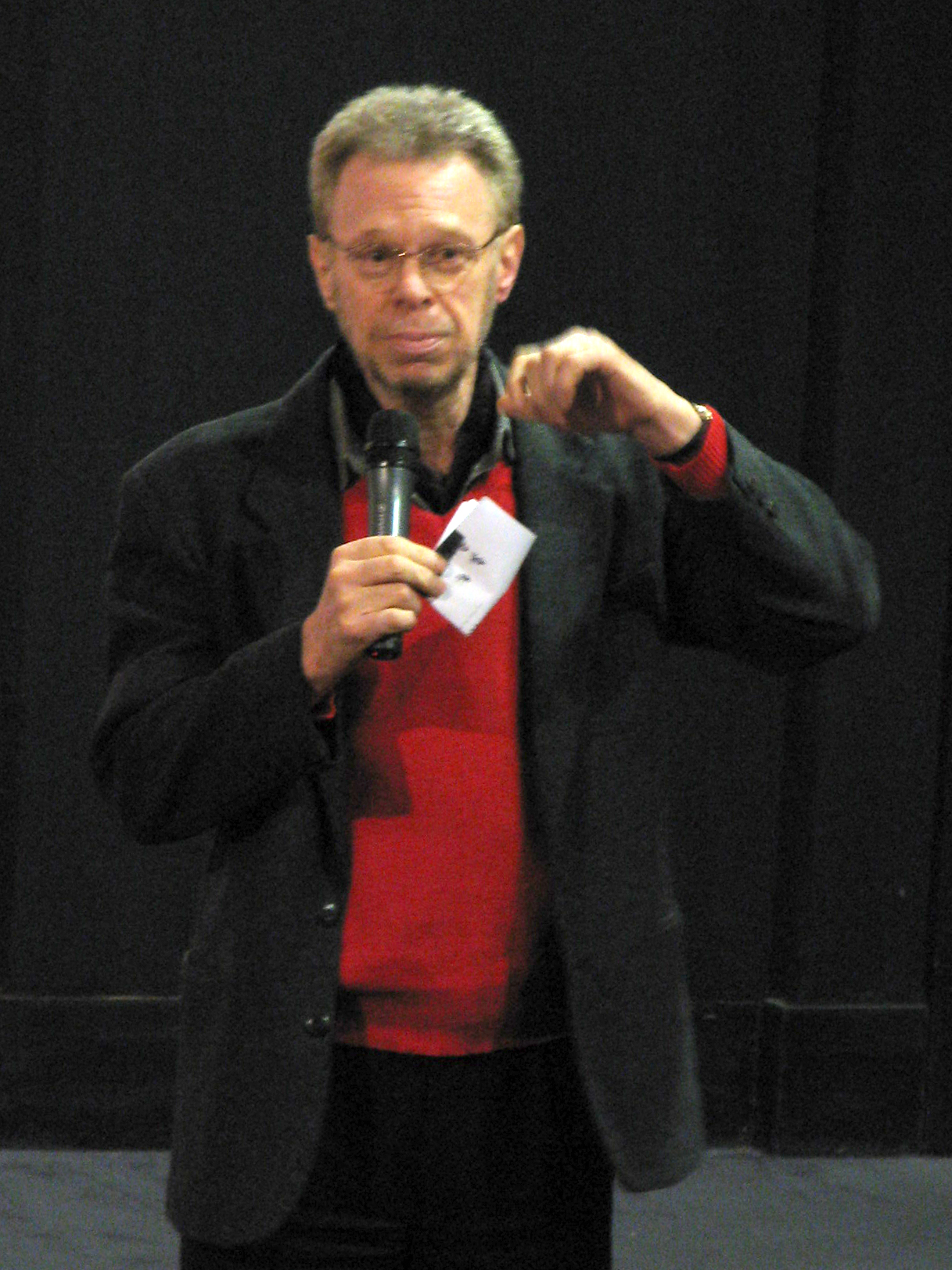
Michael Raeburn, director of The Grass is Singing

The 1980 film Shamwari, also known as Chain Gang Killings in the United States, is an action thriller about two escaped prisoners, one Black, one White and their developing friendship. The film was set and filmed in Rhodesia, starring several local White actors, such as Tamara Franke in the role of Tracy. Four years later, Franke had a major role in Go for Gold.

The documentary film Mugabe and the White African was released to acclaim in 2009. It deals with a White Zimbabwean farming family working against Mugabe's draconian land reform policies.

In Blood Diamond (2006), Leonard DiCaprio plays Danny Archer, an ex-mercenary, diamond-smuggler and self-proclaimed "Rhodesian", whose parents were murdered on their farm by rebels. The adventure drama film is set in 1999 during the Sierra Leone Civil War. In The Interpreter (2005) by Sydney Pollack, Nicole Kidman plays the lead role of Silvia Broome, a White African and New York-based United Nations interpreter raised in the fictional African republic of Matobo under the rule of an authoritarian leader. Matobo is widely considered to be symbolic of Zimbabwe and the film contains parallels between Mugabe and Matobo's fictional dictator.

=== Beauty pageants ===
Miss Rhodesia was the national beauty pageant of Rhodesia and its antecedents. Each year many local White women competed in the competition and it debuted in Miss World in 1959. Rhodesia participated in Miss World 1965, with Lesley Bunting representing the country only days after Rhodesia's Unilateral Declaration of Independence. However, the country was excluded from the competition from 1966 onwards. Beverley Donald Davy, the mother of Chelsy Davy, was crowned the 1973 Miss Rhodesia. Only White women were crowned Miss Rhodesia between 1959 and 1976, with Connie Makaya becoming the first Black Miss Rhodesia in 1977. When Rhodesia transitioned to a majority democracy and became Zimbabwe in 1980, Miss Rhodesia became Miss Zimbabwe. In 2023, Brooke Bruk-Jackson, a White Zimbabwean woman was crowned Miss Universe Zimbabwe.

==== Sports ====
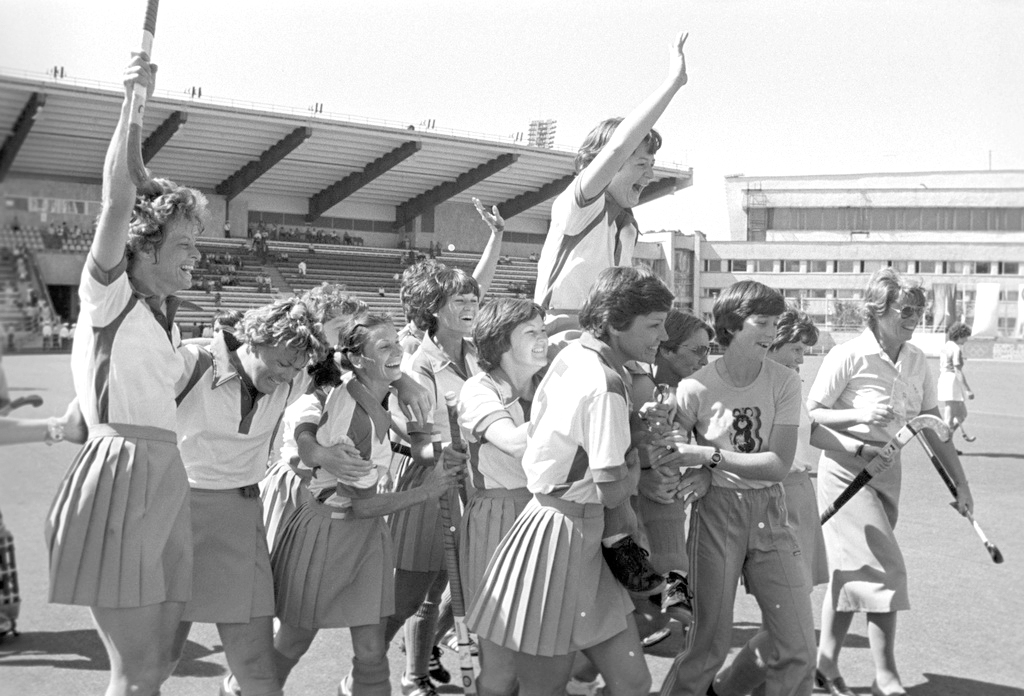
The all-White Zimbabwean field hockey team that won gold at the 1980 Olympics

Before 1980, Rhodesian representation in international sporting events was almost exclusively White. Zimbabwean participation in some international sporting events continued to be White-dominated until well into the 1990s. For example, no Black player was selected for the Zimbabwean cricket team until 1995. Rally driver Conrad Rautenbach (son of Billy) won the FIA African Championship, scoring at the Dunlop Zimbabwe Challenge Rally in 2005 and 2006. An iconic event is the all-White Zimbabwean women's field hockey team, captained by Ann Grant (formerly Ann Fletcher) and winning gold medals at the Moscow Olympics in July 1980 (Ann Grant's brother, cricketer Duncan Fletcher, later became manager of the England cricket team).

An exception to this trend during the 1960s and 1970s was in association football, where the national team was predominantly Black, with the notable exceptions of the White forward Bobby Chalmers, who captained the team during its unsuccessful attempt to qualify for the 1970 World Cup, and goalkeeper Bruce Grobbelaar.

The professional swimmer, Charlene, Princess of Monaco, competed at the 2000 Sydney Olympics. She was born and raised in Bulawayo, before relocating with her family to South Africa in 1989 when she was twelve years old. However, she represented South Africa at professional sporting competitions. Australian rugby union player David Pocock is also a well-known Zimbabwean, having emigrated to Australia in 2002 at age 14. Pocock would be elected an Australian Senator in 2022. He would renounce his Zimbabwean citizenship to comply with section 44(1) of the Australian Constitution, which forbids parliamentarians from holding dual citizenship. Kirsty Coventry won two Olympic gold medals in the 2004 Athens Olympics and the 2008 Beijing Olympics along with total medals of seven including four silver and one bronze, becoming the most decorative Olympian in Africa. In 2025 she was elected as the president of the International Olympic Committee becoming the first woman, first African and second non-European to occupy the position.

== Involvement in Zimbabwean politics ==
=== Political and economic background ===
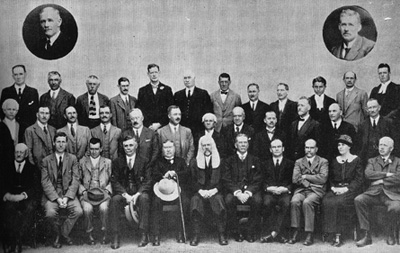
First government of Southern Rhodesia in 1923

During the UDI era, Rhodesia developed a siege economy as the means of withstanding UN sanctions. The country operated a strict system of exchange and import controls, while major export items were channelled through state trade agencies (such as 'the Grain Marketing Board'). This approach was continued until around 1990, at which time International Monetary Fund and World Bank development funding was made conditional upon the adoption of economic liberalisation. In 1991, Zimbabwe adopted the ESAP (Economic Structural Adjustment Programme), which required privatisation, the removal of exchange and import controls, trade deregulation and the phasing out of export subsidies. Up until the time of independence, the economy relied mainly on the export of a narrow range of primary products, including tobacco, asbestos and gold. In the post-independence period, the world markets for all these products deteriorated, and it was hoped that the ESAP would facilitate diversification.

ESAP and its successor ZIMPREST (Zimbabwe Programme for Economic and Social Transformation) caused considerable economic turbulence. Some sectors of the economy did benefit, but the immediate results included job losses, a rise in poverty, and a series of exchange rate crises. The associated economic downturn caused the budget deficit to rise, which put pressure on public services, and the means used to finance the budget deficit caused hyperinflation. These factors created a situation in which many bright and qualified Zimbabweans (both Black and White) had to look abroad for work opportunities.

Zimbabwean politics since 1990 have therefore been conducted against a background of economic difficulty, with the manufacturing sector (in particular) being 'hollowed out'. However, some parts of the economy continue to perform well: the Zimbabwe stock exchange and property market have experienced minor booms, while outsiders are coming to invest in both mining and land operations.

In the period immediately after independence, some White political leaders (such as Ian Smith) sought to maintain the identity of White Zimbabweans as a separate group. In particular, they wished to maintain a separate "white roll", maintaining the election of 20 seats in parliament reserved for White people; this was abolished in 1987. Despite this, a number of White Zimbabweans embraced the political changes, and many even joined Zanu-PF in the 1980s and 1990s: for example, Timothy Stamps served as Minister of Health in the Zimbabwean government from 1986 to 2002. Denis Norman held several cabinet positions; Minister of Agriculture (1980–1985, 1995–1997), Minister of Transport (1990–1997) and Minister of Power (1992–1997).

=== Wealthy Zimbabweans ===
In the 2000s, an elite network of White businessmen and senior military officers became associated with a faction of ZANU-PF identified with Emmerson Mnangagwa, a former Security Minister and later Speaker of Parliament. Mnangagwa was described by reporters of the Daily News as "the richest politician in Zimbabwe". He is believed to have favoured the early retirement of President Mugabe, and a conciliatory approach towards the regime's domestic opponents; this line has displeased other elements in ZANU-PF. In June 2006, John Bredenkamp (a prominent former Mnangagwa associate) fled Zimbabwe in his private jet, after government investigations into the affairs of his Breco trading company were started. Bredenkamp returned to Zimbabwe in September 2006, after his passport was returned by court order.

In July 2002, 92 prominent Zimbabweans were subject to EU "smart sanctions", intended to express disapproval of various Zimbabwe government policies. These persons were banned from the EU, and access to assets they own in the EU was frozen. Ninety-one of those on the blacklist were Black, and one was White: Dr. Timothy Stamps.

Many observers found the EU's treatment of Dr. Stamps to be curious, given that by July 2002 he was retired from active politics and a semi-invalid. In addition, Stamps was widely considered to be a highly dedicated doctor who had never been implicated in any form of wrongdoing. The same observers found it equally strange that the EU Commission did not include the wealthy White backers of Mugabe on the list.

=== Political representation ===
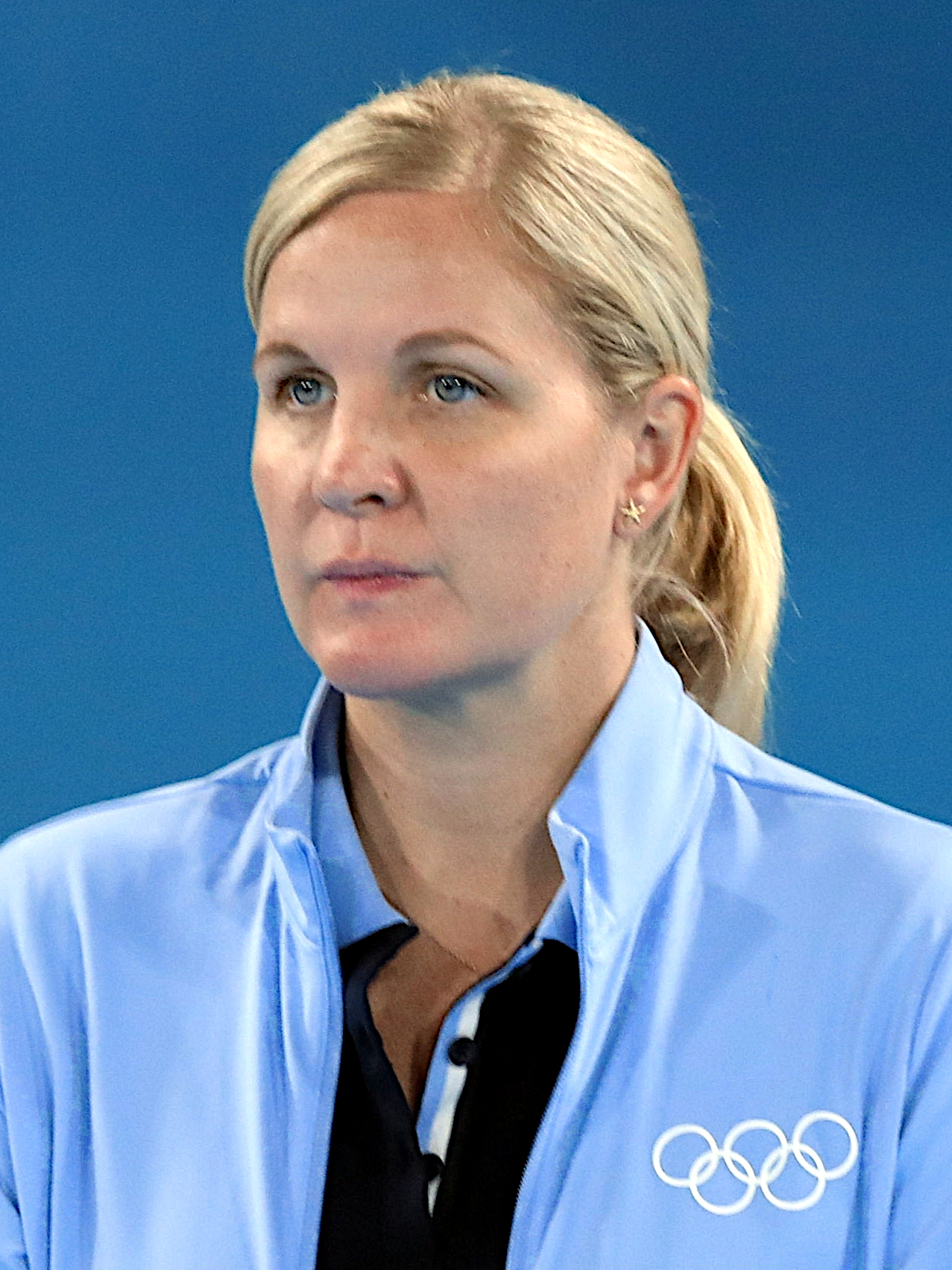
Youth, sports and recreation minister (2018-2025) Kirsty Coventry

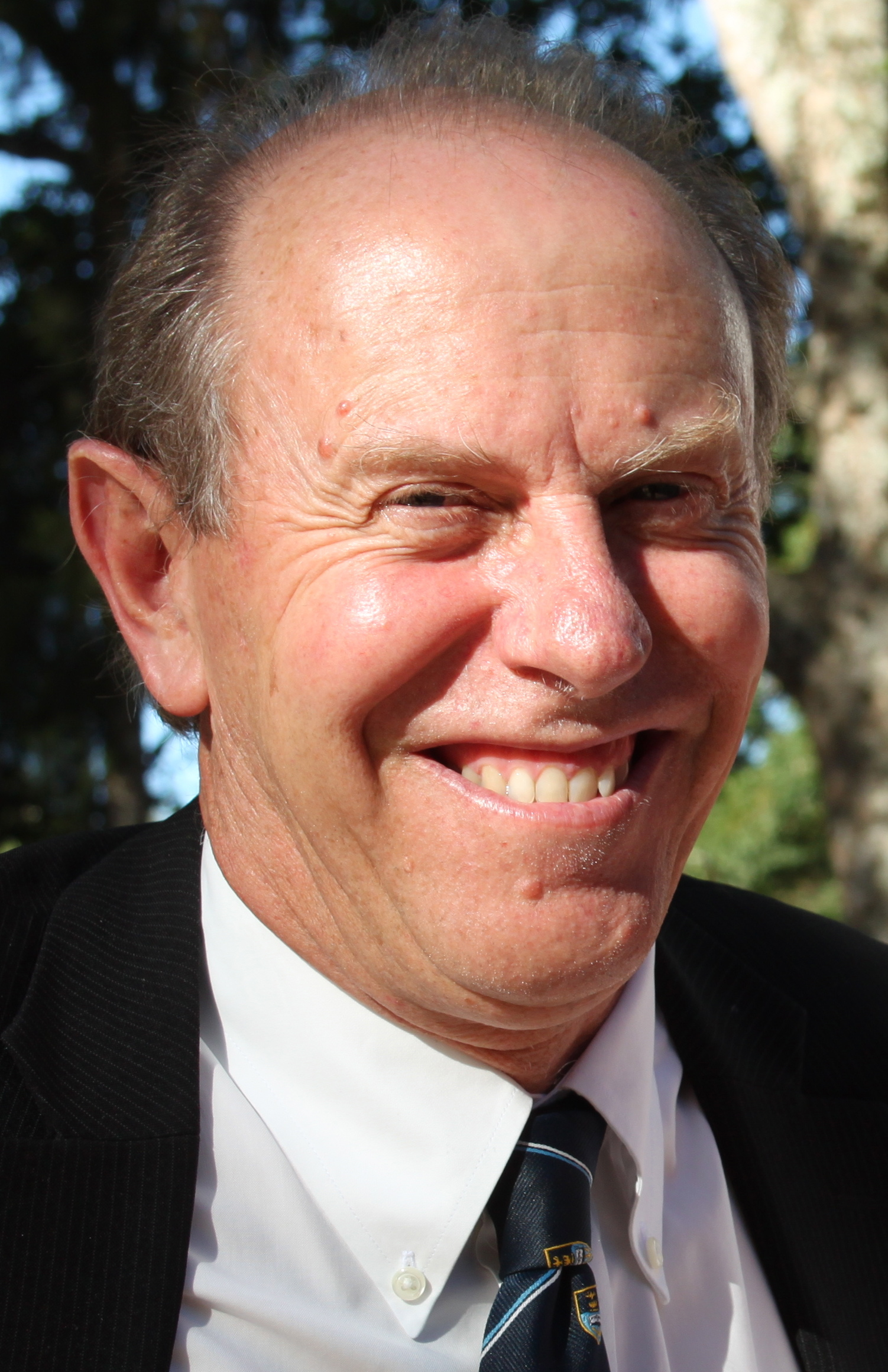
Bulawayo mayor David Coltart

From around 1990 onwards, mainstream White opinion favoured opposition politics to that of Mugabe's ZANU party, who controlled the government. White Zimbabweans sought to vote for liberal economics, democracy and the rule of law. White people had lain low in the immediate post-independence period, but, in 1999 they recognised a common disquiet with the majority of people over ZANU excesses in government, and gave Whites an opportunity to vote for an opposition, which initially grew out of the trade union movements who were enabling citizens to have a voice and vote with the majority of Zimbabweans. White Zimbabweans played a significant role in the campaign of the opposition MDC party, which almost won the election. Radical elements in the country perceived the MDC project to have been an attempt to restore a limited form of White minority rule, and this produced a violent backlash.

The late Roy Bennett, a White farmer forced off his coffee plantation after it was overrun by radical militants and then expropriated, won a strong victory in the Chimanimani constituency (adjoining the Mozambican border) in the 2000 general election. Bennett (a former Conservative Alliance of Zimbabwe member) won his seat for the Movement for Democratic Change, and was one of four White MDC constituency MPs elected in 2000. Bennett died in a helicopter crash in Raton, New Mexico, United States in 2018.

Other White MPs elected in 2000 included David Coltart (a prominent human rights lawyer and founding legal secretary of the MDC) and Michael Auret (a civil rights activist of long standing, who had opposed White minority rule in the 1970s). Trudy Stevenson was a White American who had lived in Uganda until 1972, before fleeing from the regime of Idi Amin. Stevenson served as the MDC's Secretary for Policy and Research before being elected to Parliament. In July 2006, after attending a political meeting in the Harare suburb of Mabvuku, Stevenson was attacked, suffering panga wounds to the back of her neck and head. The MDC leadership immediately claimed that the attack was carried out by ZANU militants; however, while recovering in hospital, the MP for Harare North positively identified her assailants as members of a rival faction of the MDC. This incident illustrates the violent and faction-ridden nature of Zimbabwean politics. Zimbabwean politicians routinely accuse each other of murder, theft, electoral fraud, conspiracy and treason; it is often difficult to know the truth of such stories. Eddie Cross was also elected to parliament in 2000 before retiring from politics in 2018. Cross, a leading economist, served as the MDC's Economic Secretary and shadow finance minister. In the Parliamentary and Presidential elections, Cross, and Coltart were re-elected to their seats and a White Zimbabwean farmer, Iain Kay took the seat of Marondera Central. Stevenson lost her seat in Mount Pleasant, Harare. Stevenson served as Zimbabwe's ambassador to Senegal from 2009 until her death in 2019.

Kirsty Coventry was Minister of Youth, Sport, Arts and Recreation from 2018 to 2025.

== See also ==
- British diaspora in Africa
- List of White Zimbabweans of European ancestry
- Racism in Zimbabwe
- Zimbabwean diaspora
- Zimbabweans
- White people
- White Angolans
- White South Africans
- Pieds-noirs
- White people in Botswana
- White people in Zambia
- White demographic decline
- History of the Jews in Zimbabwe
- Afrikaners in Zimbabwe
- Greeks in Zimbabwe
- Italian Zimbabweans
