= Toy Train (song) =

Song by John Edmond
- B-side: "Luciana"
- Published: 1973
- Genre: Country, Pop, Rock
- Length: 2:56
- Label: Map
- Songwriter: Dewayne Blackwell
- Producer: Terry Dempsey

"Toy Train" is a country, pop, and rock song written by American Dewayne Blackwell and first performed by Northern Rhodesian-born John Edmond. The song upon release on 13 April 1973 spent 18 weeks on the South African music charts (Springbok Radio Top 20), peaking at number 6; it was Edmond's highest charting single in South Africa. It entered the Rhodesian charts on 2 June, peaking at number 14 in four weeks.
