= Afrikaners in Zimbabwe =

Zimbabweans of Afrikaner birth or descent

Total population
- 15,000 (1984); 11,571 (2013) (South African citizens, not including by ancestry)

Regions with significant populations
- Harare, Bulawayo, Mutare, Chivhu, Manicaland, Midlands

Languages
- English, Afrikaans

Religion
- Christianity (predominantly Dutch Reformed Church; also other Protestant churches)

Related ethnic groups
- Afrikaners, white South Africans, white Zimbabweans

Afrikaners in Zimbabwe are the descendants of Afrikaans-speaking migrants to Zimbabwe, almost all of whom originated from the Cape of Good Hope, Free State and Transvaal in modern South Africa. At their peak they formed 10-15% of white Zimbabweans, but only a small fraction of the greater population. Persons of Afrikaans heritage abound in Zimbabwean society particularly in sports such as cricket, rugby union, agriculture, tourism, conservation and traditionally, farming, however few are recognised as such, as unlike South Africa, the majority of Afrikaner people can now speak English and are seen as indistinguishable from other whites by greater society.

Today, Afrikaans is spoken by a small minority of Zimbabweans, less than one percent of the population and the number of whom has declined significantly since 1980. Today's, Afrikaans speakers in Zimbabwe are typically recent Afrikaner immigrants from South Africa or their descendants.

== History ==
Afrikaners first arrived in what would become Southern Rhodesia in the early 1890s, recruited to be among the first pioneers by Cecil Rhodes, who sought to bring their agricultural expertise for the new region. A larger wave of migrants flowed into the country following a depression after the second Boer War, mostly from the Cape and Orange Free State. They spread throughout the country, taking up farming and cattle ranching. Afrikaners settled in rural areas outside towns and cities, so they could sell their agricultural products. Bulawayo, Enkeldoorn, Umtali, Salisbury, and particularly, Melsetter, became Afrikaner population centers. Concerns over the rapid influx, by the largely British settler community, led to the British South Africa Company officials imposing restrictions of Afrikaner migration which led to protests in South Africa and accusations of discrimination.

Afrikaner children, especially in rural areas, were initially educated in Afrikaans. However, following the Second Boer War, British colonial authorities increasingly demanded that Afrikaner schools teach in English. Despite Afrikaner complaints, the British South Africa Company, which governed the territory until 1923, would not budge. In a letter written in response to protesting Afrikaners, the secretary to the administrator of Southern Rhodesia wrote: "... the laws of the country make no provision for Dutch teaching, and even recently the Administrator has publicly stated that there is no prospect of change in the said laws." L. M. Foggin, the colonial director of education, warned in an official report: "I am convinced that if the concession of mother-tongue instruction were allowed in the schools of Rhodesia, it would result at once in Dutch districts in the teaching to the children of characteristic anti-British and anti-Imperial principles of the Nationalist party."

In spite of this issue, Afrikaners assimilated fairly well into the larger English-speaking white population, and were generally seen as loyal to the Southern Rhodesian government. Afrikaners preserved their language and culture through their own institutions. Dutch Reformed churches commonly conducted Afrikaans services in the morning, followed by services in English and indigenous African languages in the afternoon. An Afrikaans-language school, Bothashof, was established in 1911 in Bulawayo. An Afrikaner organisation, the Afrikaans Cultural Union of Rhodesia (AKUR), was established in 1934, and sought to preserve Afrikaner culture in Rhodesia, particularly through creating an Afrikaans press and by promoting the Afrikaans language in schools. A printing press was acquired, and AKUR began publishing Afrikaans daily newspapers and magazines, including Zambesi Ringsblad, Kern, Die Rhodesiër, and Die Volksgenoot.

== Postwar period ==
Tension over language and cultural differences between Afrikaners and the English continued to exist, coming to a head in 1944, when the so-called "Enkeldoorn incident", in which an Afrikaner boy killed an English boy at the Enkeldoorn School, made headlines. A commission investigating the incident found that the incident was motivated by language and cultural tensions, which at the time were inflamed by World War II, as many English suspected Afrikaners of having German sympathies. Nevertheless, the Afrikaner population in Rhodesia continued to grow and more Afrikaner organisations were established, including the Afrikaner Youth in 1947) and the Association of Rhodesian Afrikaners (GRA) in 1965. The GRA soon became the preeminent Afrikaner organisation in the country, organising Afrikaner cultural activities and lobbying for greater Afrikaans language rights, particularly in schools.

By the late 1960s, the Afrikaner population in Rhodesia had grown to 25,000. After the mid 1960s, Afrikaners began to enter Rhodesian politics. Notable Afrikaner politicians during this period included several cabinet ministers: Rowan Cronjé, P. K. van der Byl, Wickus De Kock and Phillip van Heerden. Though the Rhodesian government under premier Ian Smith was on better terms with Afrikaners than previous governments, the issue of education remained. Bothashof, which had relocated to Salisbury in 1946, remained the country's only Afrikaans-medium school. In 1971, the Association of Rhodesian Afrikaners made an urgent call to the government, demanding that they open more Afrikaans-language schools, but the government ignored them. The Afrikaner population in Rhodesia peaked at 35,000 in 1975, and began declining thereafter. As Afrikaners emigrated to South Africa, Afrikaner organisations saw decline; the GRA gradually became less active. In 1977, the Rhodesian Afrikaner Action Circle (RAAK) was established in Bulawayo, and soon became the main Afrikaner organisation in the country. Kern and Die Rhodesiër, the two major Afrikaans newspapers in Rhodesia, were edited by RAAK members.

== Current status ==
After Zimbabwe's independence in 1980, much of the country's Afrikaner population emigrated, almost exclusively to South Africa. The GRA was disestablished in the early 1980s. A new Afrikaner organization, the Afrikaner Community of Zimbabwe, was founded in April 1981 in Harare.

Bothashof, the country's Afrikaans-medium school, saw its enrollment drop from 450 in 1980 to 160 in 1982. The school closed and reopened the next year as Eaglesvale High School, a multiracial English-medium school with an English headmaster. This marked an end to Afrikaans-only education in Zimbabwe, though the language remains an optional foreign language. By 1984, just 15,000 Afrikaners remained in Zimbabwe, a nearly 60% decline from ten years earlier.

== Afrikaans today ==
The current status of Afrikaans and Afrikaners is generally overlooked in Zimbabwean society. The history of Afrikaner migration and their contributions were long ignored, by Rhodesian authorities, who feared being swamped by bijwoners or poor undesirables from South Africa, and thus heavily restricted their entry into the country and discriminated against them socially. Post-independence Zimbabwe has had little incentive to teach and maintain Afrikaans, and tensions in the 1980s with the apartheid government only worsened relations between the two countries, hastening the decline of the language.

As a result, today, most Zimbabwean-born Afrikaners tend to be mostly English speaking and thus lumped together with the much larger anglophone white population, especially in the eyes of black and younger Zimbabweans who know little of the colonial era. Indeed, persons of Afrikaner heritage in the media, such as Andy Blignaut, Dirk Viljoen and Mark Vermeulen tend to be anglophones who speak Zimbabwean English, with general or cultivated accents, making them appear assimilated in the eyes of the public.

Former minority Afrikaans speaking districts, such as Chivhu, are overwhelmingly Shona speaking today, with English the language of commerce and Afrikaans seen as a completely foreign language. Very few Zimbabweans, white or black, speak the language. Additionally, the children of Dutch immigrants to Zimbabwe, who arrived in the post war years, assimilated almost exclusively into the white Zimbabwean community, further rendering the idea of an Afrikaans community in Zimbabwe all but unheard of.

Despite these challenges, and the disruption caused by Zimbabwe's economic crisis, a tiny community of Afrikaans-speakers exists in the country particularly in the farming and ex-farming communities, though individuals who speak Afrikaans as a first languages are almost always 'othered' and viewed as South Africans rather than natives.

== See also ==
- Afrikaners
- South African diaspora

== Notable people ==
- Andy Blignaut - cricket player for the Zimbabwe national cricket team
- P.K. van der Byl- Minister of Foreign Affairs under the Smith minority government
- Dirk Viljoen- former cricket player for the Zimbabwe national cricket team
- Pieter Dixon- Zimbabwean rugby union player for Bath Rugby.
- Dean du Plessis- broadcaster and sports commentator
- Paul Maritz- computer scientist and software executive.
- Mark Dekker- former Zimbabwean international cricketer
- Ryan Bezuidenhout- Zimbabwean first-class cricketer
- Glenn Goosen- former Zimbabwean batsman, bowler and wicket-keeper
- Mariette Van Heerden- discus thrower and shot putter
- Wayne Visser- writer, speaker, film producer, academic, social entrepreneur and futurist
- Bruce Grobbelaar- former goalkeeper, most prominently for Liverpool, and for the Zimbabwean national team.
- Eli Colin Snyman- rugby union player for Italian side Benetton in the Pro14.
