= When a Crocodile Eats the Sun =

2006 book by Peter Godwin

When A Crocodile Eats the Sun
- Author: Peter Godwin
- Language: English
- Genre: Memoirs
- Publisher: Picador
- Publication date: 2006 (UK & South Africa), 2007 (US)
- Publication place: United Kingdom
- Media type: Print (Hardback & Paperback)
- Pages: 416
- ISBN: 0-330-43369-5
- OCLC: 70399364
- Preceded by: Mukiwa
- Followed by: The Fear: The Last Days of Robert Mugabe

When a Crocodile Eats the Sun is a 2006 book of memoirs by Peter Godwin. It is a continuation of Godwin's earlier memoirs, Mukiwa. The book was published by Picador.

== Content ==
Godwin, a White Zimbabwean follows the escalating political change in his home country as bloody land invasions and corruption engulf the country. He visits besieged white farmers and the families of those murdered. The book concentrates on conflicts between the MDC and Robert Mugabe's ZANU-PF and on family dynamics. His family's connections to the situation in Zimbabwe are thoroughly explored, in particular with the revelation that his father was a Polish Jew fleeing the Warsaw Ghetto.

== Reception ==
"Tender, frustrated, unsentimental – this potent memoir holds little joy for Zimbabwe but is fiercely proud of its subjects' unyielding integrity." James Urquhart, The Independent.

"His book is heartfelt, absorbing and profoundly moving." Ian Critchley, The Sunday Times

"haunting and beautifully written.. He has written a powerful and deeply affecting book about a family trying to ride the tsunami of change." Michiko Kakutani, New York Times

"Peter Godwin, an acclaimed Zimbabwean journalist now living in Manhattan, masterfully weaves the political and the highly personal. An eyewitness account of that cataclysmic time, When a Crocodile Eats the Sun is also a tribute to Godwin's aging parents and a searing exploration of the author's own soul." Wendy Kann, The Washington Post
