= John Edmond =

Northern Rhodesian folk singer

- Born: 18 November 1936 (age 89); Luanshya, Northern Rhodesia (now Zambia)
- Occupations: Singer; songwriter; musician
- Years active: 1956–present
- Spouse: Teresa Edmond
- Children: 4
- Musical career
- Genres: Skiffle; pop; country; folk; rock and roll
- Instruments: Vocals; guitar; bagpipes
- Label: Roan Antelope Music
- Military career
- Allegiance: Rhodesia and Nyasaland; Rhodesia
- Branch: Rhodesian Army
- Service years: (Federation of Rhodesia and Nyasaland) (1960–1963) (Rhodesia) (1971–1979)
- Rank: Trooper
- Unit: 3rd (Northern Rhodesia) Battalion, Rhodesia Regiment
- Conflicts: Congo Border War; Rhodesian Bush War
- Website: johnedmond.co.za

John Edmond, also known as the "Bush Cat", (born 18 November 1936) is a Rhodesian-South African musician and former soldier.

Edmond's musical career began in the late 1950s and early 1960s. His early music career ran parallel to his military service in the Rhodesia Regiment, which he served in from 1960 to 1963. During his time in the military, Edmond often performed his music for his fellow soldiers. Following his time in the military, Edmond relocated to Johannesburg in the mid-1960s, working in both I.T. and music during his initial years of living in South Africa.

Edmond gained increased recognition in 1966 after writing "The U.D.I. Song" for South African singer Nick Taylor, a song which charted in Rhodesia and South Africa and subsequently began a full-time career in music. From 1971 to 1979, Edmond had a career as an armed entertainer for troops in the Rhodesian Security Forces during the Rhodesian Bush War. His work as an entertainer for the military during the Bush War led him to writing and releasing his most notable album Troopiesongs in 1976, which is largely written about the Bush War.

After the Rhodesian Bush War's conclusion and the independence of Zimbabwe, Edmond continued his music career in South Africa. He later started his own record label called Roan Antelope Music, named after the Roan Antelope copper mine in modern-day Zambia that Edmond worked in as a young man, under which he released his own music.

Due to running parallel to his time working for the Rhodesian Armed Forces, Edmond's earlier music often was about military service, major events in Rhodesian military history, and the life of soldiers. In addition to still writing about music related to the lives of soldiers and military service, Edmond's later music also often included topics about notable events and figures in the history of Southern Africa, his own family, and about life and the people of Rhodesia, Zimbabwe, and South Africa, and Christian themes.

== Background ==
John Edmond was born on 18 November 1936 in the town of Luanshya, which at the time of his birth was a part of the British protectorate of Northern Rhodesia, and is now presently located in Zambia as a part of the country's Copperbelt Province. Edmond's family is of Scottish origin. Edmond and his immediate family split their time between Edinburgh and Luanshya during his childhood. As a teenager, Edmond received further education at the Christian Brothers' College in Pretoria, South Africa.

Edmond was given a mouth organ as a birthday gift from his grandmother at age three and subsequently mastered the instrument within half an hour. As a Boy Scout, he played the bugle and was in the local Scout bugle band. While at school in Edinburgh, he was chosen to sing in the St John's Boys' Choir. At Christian Brothers' College, Edmond frequently took part in the productions of Gilbert and Sullivan operettas, often being in lead roles in these productions, and was also the lead drummer in the college's pipe band. He went on to win the South African Junior drumming championships at the Royal Scottish gathering at Wembley in 1953. After college, Edmond returned to Luanshya and worked at the Roan Antelope copper mine.

Edmond joined Southern Rhodesia's Royal Rhodesia Regiment at Bulawayo. He served with the 3rd Battalion on the Congo border in Nyasaland and Southern Rhodesia. During this time, he bought a guitar at a trading store and met Bill Coleman while in the army. After learning to play the guitar with Coleman, Edmond formed the Bushcats Skiffle Group in 1958 along with two friends from the army, Eugene van der Watt and Ian Kerr. The group succeeded among its peers and progressed into cabaret and rock 'n' roll. After his military service, Edmond went to England to study computers and moved to South Africa in the mid-1960s. He became famous in Rhodesia during the Bush War with his album Troopiesongs. He was also a composer, writing hits like "The U.D.I. Song". After the war and Zimbabwean independence, Edmond recorded albums such as Zimsongs and Zimtrax.

In the 1980's, Edmond founded his own record label called Roan Antelope Music (RAM); since the 1980's the majority of Edmond's music has been published under RAM. One of the first notable works published under RAM was The story of Troopiesongs and the Rhodesian Bush War, a collection of lyrics for Troopiesongs. Prior to the creation of RAM, Edmond's music was published under labels such as Gallo and the now-defunct Satbel.

Since 1987, Edmond and his wife, Theresa, have owned and maintained a resort in South Africa named Kunkuru, located in the Bela-Bela area.

In 2018, Edmond released the album Legends, an album that was written in honor of notable figures of the various peoples and time periods of South Africa, including Paul Kruger, Shaka Zulu, Wolraad Woltemade, and Nelson Mandela. Edmond released his 50th album, Tales of the Birdwatchers.

== Discography ==
Album	Year	Label	Notes
Troopiesongs – Phase 1	1976	Map	
Boom Sha-la-la-lo	1971	Storm	
Troopiesongs – Phase 2	1977	Map	
Johno!	1972	Storm	
Goodbye Is The Saddest Song	1975	Satbel	
The Greatest Hits of John Edmond	1975	Sounds Superb/EMI	Note on back of cover by John Edmond, written in English and Afrikaans, dated May 1975
Wild And Beautiful And Free	1976	Satbel	
The Best of John Edmond	1976	Satbel	
Troopiesongs – Phase 3	1978	Jo'burg	
Rhodesia The Brave	1979	Trutone	
Hit Songs of John Edmond	1975	MFP	This may also be known as the "Greatest Hits of John Edmond" (1975), as the inside record label on the Greatest Hits states that it is the "Hit Songs of John Edmond". The songs on the Hit Songs label match the jacket of the Greatest Hits (Sounds Superb/EMI).
Troopiesongs – Phase 4	1979	Gallo	
Immortal Hits	1980	Gallo	
Country Tracks	1981	Gallo	
From The Heart	1982	Gallo	
Troopies in Exile	1982	Gallo	
Love in the Country	1984	Gallo	
All Night Razzle	1984	Principal	BUSHCATS re-formed for this recording
The British South Africa Police Centenary Album	1989	RAM	
The Rhodesia Centenary Album 1890 – 1990	1990	RAM	
Rhodesians of the World	1992	RAM	
All Time Rhodesian Evergreens	1999	RAM	Reissued 2011.
Troopiesongs Complete	1999	RAM	50th Anniversary edition reissued in 2011.
Heritage – Where We Come From	2007	RAM	
Party – All Night Razzle	2007	RAM	
Aviation Songs		RAM	
Born in Africa		RAM	
By Request	2004	Gallo	
Friends, Rhodies, Countrymen	2005	RAM	
Wild and Beautiful and Free	1990	RAM	
Heritage	2007	RAM	
Zimsongs	2011	RAM	
Songs of the African Bush	2013	RAM	
Zimtrax		RAM	
Tales of the Game Rangers, Vol. 1 to Vol. 4	See notes	RAM	Volume 1 (1984), Volume 2 (1987), Volume 3 (1989), Volume 4 (1993)
Stories en Liedjies van die Wildtuin, Vol. 1 & 2		RAM	
The Boer War in Song	2012	RAM	Afrikaans version Die Boere Oorlog In Lied released in 2014 by RAM.
Campfire 'n Jamboree	2013	RAM	With The Campfire Singers
Songs of the African Battlefields	2014	RAM	
Of Aeroplanes & African Plains	2014	RAM	
Boer and Brit Battlefield Heroes	2016	RAM	
Battlesongs of Brave Boer and Briton	2017	RAM	
From the Pen of John Edmond	2017	RAM	
Legends	2018	RAM	
Tales of Bird Watches, Vol.1	2018	RAM	
Songs of Kruger Park	2019	RAM	
Tales of Bird Watchers, Vol.2	2019	RAM	
Christmas in Africa	2020	RAM	
Ian Douglas Smith: The Man	2021	RAM	A series of interviews with Ian Smith, retelling the stories of his life, with occasional songs and commentary from Edmond
Singin' with the Birds	2021	RAM	
Ballads of the Bushveld	2022		

Singles	Year	Label	Notes
Farewell Britannia	1969	Storm	
Die Eerste Kersfeesnag	1969	Storm	
Fairytales	1969	Storm	Hit single
Round and Round	1970	Storm	Hit single
Boom Sha-la-la-lo	1971	Storm	Hit single written for John by Bruce Woodley of The Seekers while they were in South Africa
Pasadena	1972	Map	Hit single
Every Day, Every Night	1972	Map	Hit single
Toy Train	1973	Map	Hit single
Hello Susan	1974	Map	
Jock of the Bushveld	1975	Map	
Goodbye Is The Saddest Song	1975	Map	Hit single
Nomad of the Kalahari	1976	Map	
One Day He'll Call Me Daddy	1976	Map	
It's Good To See You	1977	Jo'burg	
Blue Brown Eyed Lady	1977	Jo'burg	
Louie	1978	RSA	
Bye Bye Butterfly	1979	EMI	
Forever Young	1980	Gallo	
The Electric Thing	1981	Gallo	
The 124th Cavalry Regiment Lives On	2017	RAM	Produced in cooperation with the 124th Cavalry Regiment Association.

== See also ==
- Clem Tholet
