= The U.D.I. Song =

Single by Nick Taylor
- B-side: "Shangani Patrol"
- Released: 1966
- Genre: Folk
- Length: 2:21
- Label: RCA Victor
- Songwriter: John Edmond

Nick Taylor singles chronology
"The U.D.I. Song" (1966)	"Die Ou Kraal Liedjie" (1967)

"The U.D.I. Song" is a Rhodesian folk song written in 1966 by Northern Rhodesian-born John Edmond and first performed by South African Nick Taylor. It was later re-released performed by Edmond himself. The song was written as a commemoration of Southern Rhodesia's Unilateral Declaration of Independence as Rhodesia from the British Empire. The song upon release initially spent four weeks at number 1 on the Rhodesian music charts. It was then re-released in 1976 by Edmond, where it got to number 6.

== History ==
The song was written by Edmond shortly after Rhodesia had declared unilateral independence from the British Empire. It referenced the calls in the international community of Rhodesians being referred to as "rebels" and "rogues" but also mentioned that Southern Rhodesia was founded by Englishman Cecil Rhodes. The song proved popular in Salisbury and on the first anniversary of UDI, "The U.D.I. Song" reached the top of the Rhodesian music charts and remained there for four weeks owing to support for the Prime Minister of Rhodesia, Ian Smith's actions. Copies of the record were sent to the United States as well as to British pirate radio stations broadcasting to the United Kingdom from offshore.

Rhodesian flag

The song received a resurgence of popularity during the Rhodesian Bush War, when Rhodesian patriotic and folk songs received the same. Edmond re-released "The U.D.I. Song" performing it himself in 1976 as a B-side for "Wish I Was A Blue Job". This time the record did not reach the same heights as previously, but still reached a peak of number 6 in the Rhodesian charts. The song later became popular with the Rhodesian diaspora following the country's reconstitution as Zimbabwe. In 2006, Edmond included "The U.D.I. Song" in his 50th anniversary album Troopiesongs - complete, 50th Anniversary Edition.
