= Commercial Farmers' Union =

Zimbabwean agricultural organisation

- Founded: 1943; 83 years ago
- Location: Zimbabwe
- Key people: Andrew Pascoe, President; Benjamin Purcell-Gilpin, CEO
- Website: www.cfuzim.org

The Commercial Farmers' Union of Zimbabwe is an organisation that was formed to assist farmers in Zimbabwe with a variety of agricultural services. Farmers within the country pay a subscription fee which entitles them to the use of these services. Currently the president of the CFU is Peter Steyl. The Chief Executive Officer of the organisation is Hendrik Olivier.

The Commercial Farmers Union of Zimbabwe (CFU) is an independent and politically neutral membership driven organisation which represents and advances the interests of professional farmers in Zimbabwe and elsewhere in Africa. The CFU draws its membership from primarily large scale and Intensive Commercial Agricultural Producers, but membership is open to all farmers regardless of scale or land holding. The CFU's main agenda is to promote a stable and competitive agricultural business environment; and to provide advice and support to farmers – covering technical extension service, inputs, marketing aspects, business management, labour relations, advice with land and compensation issues and so on.

== Presidents ==
The following is a list of past Presidents of the Commercial Farmers' Union and its antecedents.

=== Rhodesian Agricultural Union ===
- R. A. Fletcher (1910–1914)
- E. Wilson (1914–1916)
- C. S. Jobling (1920–1923)
- S. M. Lanigan O'Keefe (1923)
- H. B. Christian (1929–1931)
- G. N. Fleming (1932–1935)

=== Rhodesian National Farmers' Union ===
- J. Dennis (1942–1944)
- Humphrey Gibbs (1944–1946)
- John Moore Caldicott (1946–1948)
- E. D. Palmer (1948–1951)
- John MacIntyre (1951–1954)
- M. Chennells (1954–1956)
- E. B. Evans (1956–1963)
- Tom Mitchell (1963–1968)
- J. W. Field (1968–1970)
- R. G. Pascoe (1970–1972)
- M. E. Butler (1972–1974)
- C. Millar (1974–1976)
- John Strong (1976–1978)
- Denis Norman (1978–1979)

=== Commercial Farmers' Union ===
- Denis Norman (1979–1980)
- D. B. Spain (1980–1981)
- Jim Sinclair (1981–1983)
- John Laurie (1983–1986)
- J. R. Rutherford (1986–1988)
- J. H. Brown (1988–1990)
- Alan Burl (1990–1992)
- Anthony Swire-Thompson (1992–1994)
- Peter MacSporran (1994–1996)
- Nick Swanepoel (1996–1998)
- R. D. Swift (1998)
- Nick Swanepoel (1998–1999)
- Tim Henwood (1999–2001)
- Colin Cloete (2001–2003)
- Doug Taylor-Freeme (2003–2007)
- Trevor Gifford (2007–2009)
- Deon Theron 2009–2011)
- Charles Taffs (2011–2014)
- Peter Steyl (2014–2018)
- Andrew Pascoe (2018–present)

== Notable people ==
- Mike Campbell, farmer and activist
- Lionel Cripps, first Speaker of the Southern Rhodesian Legislative Assembly; helped found the CFU
- Humphrey Gibbs, last Governor of Southern Rhodesia before UDI; helped found the CFU
- Ben Freeth, former CFU official
- Iain Kay, farmer and politician
- Paul Tangi Mhova Mkondo, member
- P. K. van der Byl, former CFU lawyer
- Jenni Williams, former CFU spokeswoman
