= Peter Godwin =

Zimbabwean author, journalist and screenwriter (born 1957)

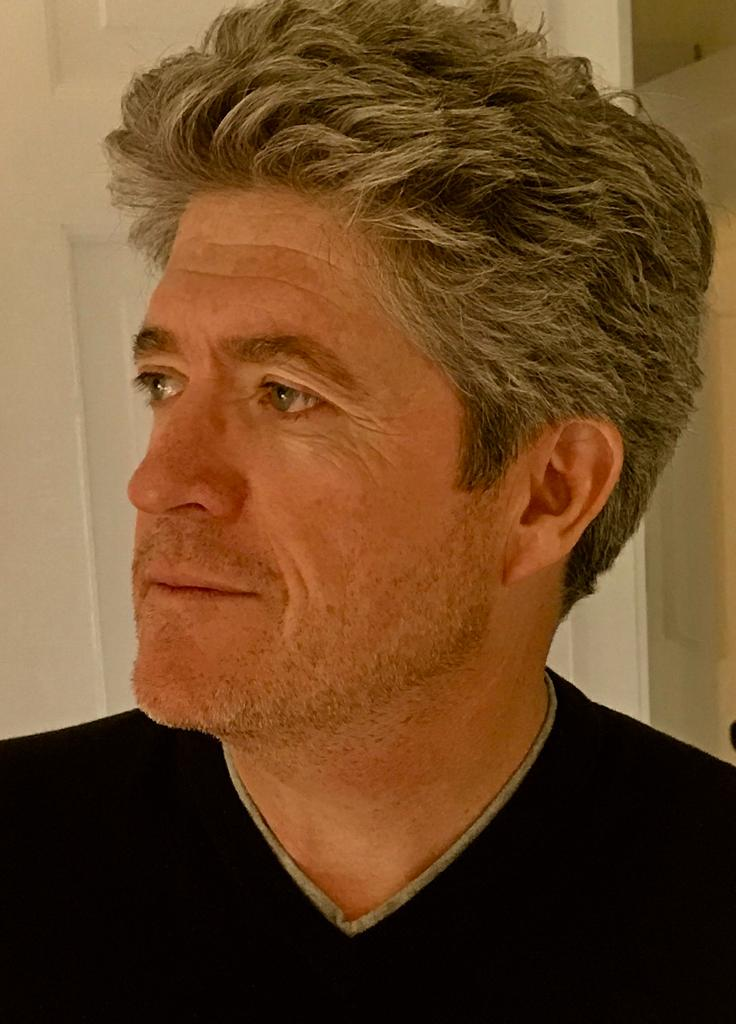
- Born: 4 December 1957 (age 68); Salisbury, Rhodesia (now Harare, Zimbabwe)
- Education: Cambridge University; Oxford University
- Occupations: Journalist, author/memoirist
- Notable credits: Foreign correspondent for The Sunday Times; Author of Mukiwa: A White Boy in Africa; Author of When A Crocodile Eats The Sun; Author of The Fear: Robert Mugabe and the Martyrdom of Zimbabwe
- Spouse: Joanna Coles (m. 2001; div. 2019)
- Children: 3

Signature
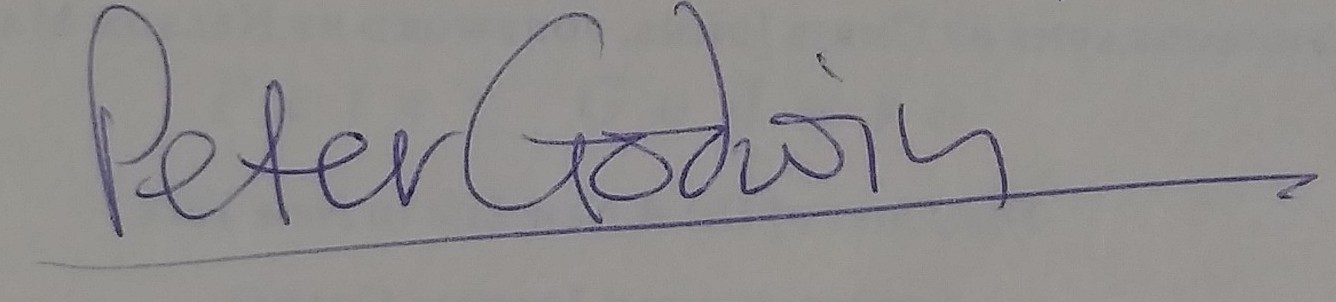

Peter Godwin (born 4 December 1957) is a Zimbabwean author, journalist, screenwriter, documentary filmmaker, and former human rights lawyer. Best known for his writings concerning the breakdown of his native Zimbabwe, he has reported from more than 60 countries and written several books. He served as president of PEN American Center from 2012 to 2015 and resides in Manhattan, New York, United States.

== Early life and education ==
Godwin's mother came from an Anglican background in England; in her twenties, she moved to Southern Rhodesia, where she was a medical doctor. Godwin's father, Kazimierz Jerzy Goldfarb, a Polish Jewish engineer, moved to the country from England after marrying Godwin's mother. Godwin's paternal grandparents and aunts were murdered at Treblinka extermination camp in the Holocaust. For fear of anti-semitism, Godwin's father did not tell his children about his Jewish background for decades and instead went by the name George Godwin.

Godwin grew up with his family in Rhodesia, where he attended St. George's College. He was conscripted into the British South Africa Police at the age of seventeen to fight in the Rhodesian Bush War. In 1978, his older sister Jain and her fiancé were killed when their car was ambushed by insurgents. Another sister, Georgina Godwin, has worked as a journalist, broadcast presenter and podcaster, in both Zimbabwe and the UK.

Peter Godwin studied law at Cambridge University and international relations at Oxford University.

== Career ==
=== Early career ===
Godwin was formerly a foreign correspondent for The Sunday Times (London), covering wars in Angola, Mozambique, Namibia, and Zimbabwe. Later, he was the chief correspondent for the BBC's foreign affairs programme, directing documentaries on Cuba, Czechoslovakia, and the Balkans.

His early books include Rhodesians Never Die: The Impact of War and Political Change on White Rhodesia c1970 – 1980, co-written with Ian Hancock; The Three of Us, co-written with Joanna Coles; and Wild at Heart: Man and Beast in Southern Africa, with photographs by Chris Johns.

=== Journalism ===
Godwin is a contributor to The New York Times and Vanity Fair, among other publications. In 2008, he wrote in the Times about the small islands of Likoma and Chizumulu on Lake Malawi, which are lacustrine exclaves of Malawi located in Mozambican territorial waters. He has also reviewed books for The New York Times Book Review.

In 2007, he called for the international community to "make it clear" to South African president Thabo Mbeki "that he, and the new South Africa, have a special moral obligation to help a nearby people who are oppressed and disenfranchised, having been assisted in its own struggle by just such pressure." In 2008, Godwin suggested in The New York Times that the withdrawal of participating countries from the 2010 World Cup in South Africa might persuade Mbeki to use his country's economic power to draw Mugabe's rule in Zimbabwe "to an end in weeks rather than months".

=== Other professional activities ===
In 2012, Godwin was named President of PEN American Center, the largest branch of the world's oldest literary and human rights organisation. On 20 March 2012, as the incoming president of PEN American Center, Godwin read poetry by the imprisoned Liu Xiaobo, with outgoing PEN America President, Kwame Anthony Appiah.

Godwin was a member of the Council on Foreign Relations. He has been a Guggenheim Fellow, an Orwell Fellow, and a MacDowell Fellow, and has also taught writing at The New School, Princeton University, and Columbia University.

== Books and documentaries ==
=== Industry of Death ===
Godwin's film The Industry of Death (1993) was an investigation of Thailand's sex industry.

=== Mukiwa ===
In 1997, Godwin published Mukiwa: A White Boy in Africa. A memoir about growing up in Southern Rhodesia in the 1960s and 1970s during the Rhodesian Bush War, it was described by The Boston Globe as "devastatingly brilliant" and "[o]ne of the best memoirs to come out of Africa". The book won the Orwell Prize in 1997.

=== When a Crocodile Eats the Sun ===
In 2006, Godwin's second memoir, When a Crocodile Eats the Sun, was published. It details the ebbing of his father's life, set against the backdrop of modern-day Zimbabwe, and his discovery of his father's Polish Jewish roots.

=== The Fear ===
Godwin's book, The Fear: Robert Mugabe and the Martyrdom of Zimbabwe (2011), chronicles the campaign of murder and torture unleashed by Zimbabwe's autocratic ruler following his defeat at the polls. Godwin was interviewed by Terry Gross on Fresh Air (NPR) in March 2011 about the situation in Zimbabwe since the 2008 general election.

The Fear was selected as a best book of 2011 by The New Yorker, The Economist, and Publishers Weekly.

=== Exit Wounds ===
Godwin's fourth memoir, Exit Wounds, was published in September 2024 by Canongate Books.

== Personal life ==
Godwin was married to Joanna Coles. The couple lived on the Upper West Side of Manhattan with their sons, Thomas and Hugo, and with a dog, Phoebe. His daughter, Holly, is based in the UK. In July 2019, Coles filed for divorce from Godwin.
