= Clem Tholet =

- Clem Tholet

Background information
- Born: 1948; Salisbury, Southern Rhodesia (now Harare, Zimbabwe)
- Died: 6 October 2004 (aged 56) Cape Town, Western Cape, South Africa
- Genres: Folk, rock and roll
- Instrument: Guitar
- Years active: 1966–2004
- Label: RND Records
- Spouse: Jean Smith
- Website: Official website

Clem Tholet (1948 – 6 October 2004) was a Rhodesian-born singer-songwriter and guitarist. He performed in South Africa and Rhodesia and became known in the 1970s for songs associated with Rhodesia during the Rhodesian Bush War, including recordings released by Teal and other labels. He later lived and worked in Cape Town, South Africa, where he died in 2004.

== Biography ==
Clem Tholet was born in Salisbury, Southern Rhodesia, in 1948, and began writing songs while he was an art student in Durban, South Africa. One of his first songs, Vagabond Gun was a category winner at the South Africa Music Festival in 1966. Tholet later moved back to Rhodesia to work in advertising. He started singing at Rhodesia's first folk venue, The Troubadour in Salisbury's Angwa Street. Whilst performing there, he met Sue Eccles and Andy Dillon. The trio formed a group called The Kinfolk, then moved to South Africa, and shortly after moving to Johannesburg, Eccles left the group.

Tholet and Dillon formed a new group with Yvonne Raff, which they called The Legend Trio. This new trio began singing at the original Southern African "Troubadour", and were also involved in a number of SAFMA's National Folk Fests.

Tholet married Jean Smith (step-daughter of Rhodesian Prime Minister Ian Smith) in 1967.

Tholet embarked on a solo career, recording some singles with Art Heatlie at Trutone. Mel Miller, Peter Leroy and Sylvia Stott briefly joined Tholet to form a group in 1970, before Tholet moved back to Rhodesia in 1971. Tholet returned and soon built up a strong following. He did a series of Rhodesian Television shows, and presented a radio programme called Folk on the Rocks, aired for two series. The name came from the folk club Tholet ran at The Beverley Rocks, where it played to regular packed houses.

A popular star of the annual Bless 'Em All Troop Shows, and in great demand in the Rhodesian entertainment scene, Tholet recorded his first album Songs of Love & War at Shed Studios. Tholet wrote and produced the album himself. The album was awarded a Gold Disc. He wrote the soundtrack and songs for the C.I.S. film What A Time it Was and the theme song for a film honouring the wounded troopies of Rhodesia, Tsanga, Tsanga.

He appeared at the 7 Arts Theatre, Harare in the first half, supporting the American comedian Shelley Berman with members of the Shed Studios band – consisting of Martin Norris, Steve Roskilly, Bothwell Nyamhondera, Tony Logan and Steve Hughes. As artistic director of the advertising agency Matthewman Banks and Tholet, he was instrumental in writing a great many and memorable music jingles for his clients. He produced a second album at Shed Studios, called Two Sides to Every Story, before moving back to South Africa. After living and working in the advertising industry for many years in Cape Town, Tholet died on 6 October 2004 after having suffered from the effects of a debilitating illness for a number of years.

Tholet's final album, Archives, was sold as a fundraiser for the Flame Lily Foundation, a South Africa-based organisation assisting elderly former Rhodesian and Zimbabwean residents. The foundation stated that proceeds were intended to support people who had lost access to pension income from Zimbabwe.

== Discography ==
=== Albums ===
Album	Year	Label	Notes
Songs of Love & War	1979	Teal	Gold Disc Award
Two Sides to Every Story	1978	Teal	
Archives	2004	RND	Sold as a fundraiser for Rhodesian pensioners

=== Singles ===
Singles	Year	Label	Notes
Vagabond Gun	1966	RCA Victor	Category winner South Africa Music Festival
The Cold Side	1968	Renown	
Mirror of My Mind	1968	Renown	
With Pen in Hand	1968	Renown	
True Love is a Tear	1968	Renown	
Vrystaat	1969	Renown	
Rhodesians Never Die	1973	Blackberry	
Hey, Hey Jerome	1973	Blackberry	
Peace Dream	1977	Teal	
The Last Farewell	1978	Teal	
Song for Johnny	1978	Teal	
What a Time it Was	1978	Teal	
Zambesi, Zimbabwe	1980	Stanyan	
Sunny Days and Rain	1980	Stanyan	
Used Car Dealer	1980	Stanyan	
Somebody Else's Song	1981	Stanyan	

=== Film tracks ===
Film Tracks	Year	Label	Notes
What a Time it Was			
Golden Days			
With His Hands			
Peace Dream			
If the World Had Another Hitler			
Tsanga, Tsanga			

== See also ==
- John Edmond
