= Rhodesians Never Die =

Single by Clem Tholet

from the album Songs of Love and War
- B-side: "Hey, Hey, Jerome"
- Released: 1973
- Genre: Folk
- Length: 2:24
- Label: Teal

Clem Tholet singles chronology
"Vrystaat" (1969)	"Rhodesians Never Die" (1973)	"Peace Dream" (1977)

"Rhodesians Never Die" is a Rhodesian patriotic song, written and first recorded by Rhodesian singer-songwriter Clem Tholet in 1973. Though originally released as a pop song, its lyrics caused it to gain an iconic status amongst Rhodesians during the Rhodesian Bush War of the 1970s. It caused the phrase "Rhodesians never die" to become a popular patriotic phrase amongst Rhodesians, especially during the Bush War. The phrase also became a slogan amongst white supremacists.
