= Denis Norman =

British-Zimbabwean politician (1931–2019)

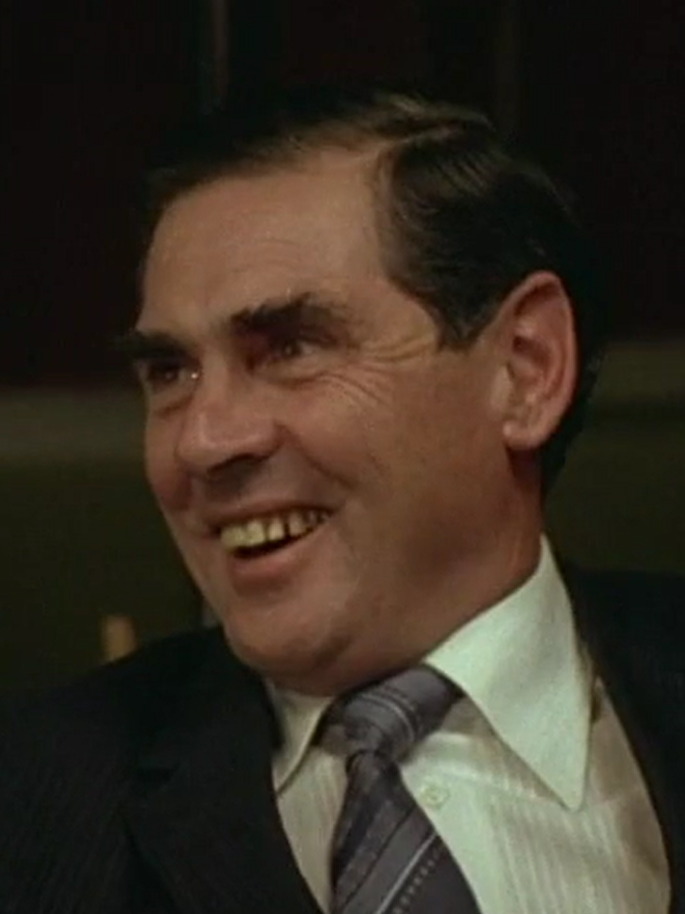
- Norman in 1981

Zimbabwean Minister of Agriculture
- In office 1980–1985

Zimbabwean Minister of Transport
- In office 1990–1997

Zimbabwean Minister of Power
- In office 1990–1997

Personal details
- Born: 26 March 1931 England
- Died: 20 December 2019 (aged 88) Harare, Zimbabwe
- Occupation: Farmer

Denis R. Norman (26 March 1931 – 20 December 2019) was a British-Zimbabwean politician who spent a total of twelve years in the Cabinet of Robert Mugabe. He was known as "Nothing Wrong Norman" due to his penchant for trying to put a positive spin on difficult situations.

From 2003 he lived in Oxfordshire, England, before his death on 20 December 2019.

== Career ==
Norman headed the Commercial Farmers' Union when Robert Mugabe came to power in 1980. Norman was appointed Minister of Agriculture that same year, and held the position from 1980 to 1985. Mugabe asked Norman to leave the government after the 1985 elections which resulted in Ian Smith's faction winning most of the (minority-designated) white roll seats. The then-Prime Minister was aggrieved that the party which was sympathetic to ZANU-PF's cause did not win even though Mugabe had 'tried to appeal to the white population in Zimbabwe'. Norman proceeded to head the Beira Corridor Group, before being appointed to two positions by President Mugabe – Minister of Transport and Minister of Power – from 1990 to 1997. As minister of transport, Norman began introducing safety regulations for public transport.
