= 2022 Zimbabwe census =

2022 census of the population of Zimbabwe

Census 2022
| ← 2012 | 20 April 2022 | 2032 → |
- Logo of the 2022 Census

General information
- Country: Zimbabwe
- Authority: Zimbabwe National Statistics Agency (ZimStat)
- Website: www.zimstat.co.zw/census/

Results
- Total population: 15,178,979
- Most populous region: Harare
- Least populous region: Bulawayo

The 2022 Zimbabwe census is the official census of the Republic of Zimbabwe. It was the 5th census of Zimbabwe since independence in 1980, the last having been taken in 2012. ZimStat released the 2022 Population and Housing Census Preliminary Results which showed that Zimbabwe's population had increased by 16.2% and stood at 15.1 million people as at 20 April 2022, compared to 13 million people at the last census in 2012. This gives an annual population growth rate of 1.5%.

The population of Zimbabwe as at 20 April 2022 was 15,178,979, of which 7,289,558 (48%) were male and 7,889,421 (52%) were female, giving a sex ratio of 92 males for every 100 females.

Given the 2012 population size of 13,061,329, this gives an annual population growth rate of 1.5%. The population constituted 3,818,992 households, giving an average of 4 persons per household.

Harare Province remains the most populous province with 16% of the total population, followed by Manicaland (13.4%) and Mashonaland West (12.5%), while the least populous provinces are Bulawayo (4.4%), Matabeleland South (5%) and Matabeleland North (5.5%). The share of urban population has increased from 33% in 2012 to 39% in 2022.
