= Portuguese Guineans =

People of Portuguese ancestry in Guinea-Bissau

Portuguese Guineans Portuguese Bissau-Guineans
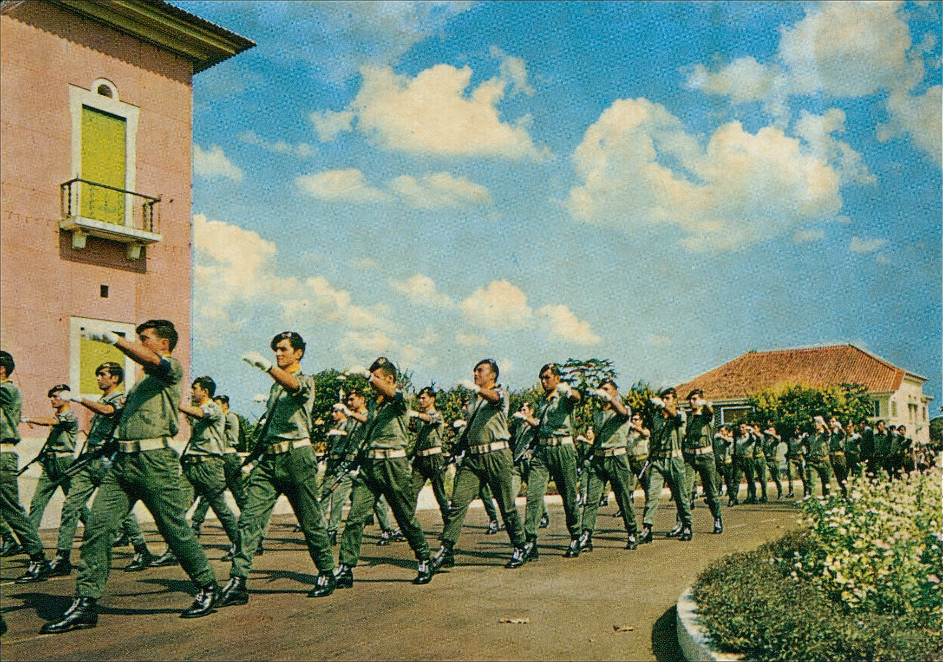
- Portuguese soldiers in Bissau in the 1960s

Total population
- 10,314

Regions with significant populations
- Bissau

Languages
- Portuguese

Religion
- Catholicism

Related ethnic groups
- Portuguese Angolans, Portuguese Mozambicans

Portuguese Guineans or Portuguese Bissau-Guineans are Bissau-Guineans of Portuguese descent.

Guinea was never a colony of mass settlement by the Portuguese Empire like Angola or Mozambique, but nonetheless maintained a settler community during its multi-century rule of the colony mainly consisting of merchants.

During the Guinea-Bissau War of Independence in the 1960s and 1970s, many of the permanent Portuguese population, which numbered around 3,000 in 1974, worked for the Companhia União Fabril chemical corporation, which had virtually controlled Portuguese Guinea by itself. Additionally, there were thousands of Portuguese military personnel stationed in the country at the time.

Many Portuguese settlers chose to return to Portugal following independence in 1974, and the country fell into a bloody civil war. Despite this, there is still a Portuguese population numbering slightly more than 10,000 people in the country.

== See also ==
- Portuguese Africans
- Portuguese Angolans
- Portuguese Mozambicans
- Portuguese Guinea
- Portuguese Colonial War
