= Portuguese South Africans =

South Africans of Portuguese birth or descent

Portuguese South Africans Luso-sul-africanos
Total population
- 750,000 (Portuguese-born and descendants) (~0.8% of the total population)

Regions with significant populations
- Johannesburg, Cape Town, Edenvale, Rosettenville, Pretoria and other large urban areas

Languages
- Portuguese, South African English, Afrikaans

Religion
- Roman Catholic, small Protestant, Muslim and Jewish minorities

Related ethnic groups
- Portuguese · Portuguese Africans · White South Africans · Italian South Africans · Greek South Africans · Mediterraneans

Portuguese South Africans (Portuguese: luso-sul-africanos) are South Africans of Portuguese ancestry. The exact figure of how many people in South Africa are Portuguese or of Portuguese descent are not accurately known as many people who arrived during the pre-1994 era quickly assimilated into English and Afrikaner speaking South African communities. There was likely also an undercount of immigrants, especially from Madeira.

== History ==
The Portuguese explored the coasts of South Africa in the late 15th century, and nominally claimed them as their own with the erecting of padrões (large stone crosses inscribed with the coat of arms of Portugal placed there as part of a land claim). Bartolomeu Dias did so in 1486, and Vasco da Gama recorded a sighting of the Cape of Good Hope in 1497, en route to India.

The early 20th century witnessed a trickle of emigrants from Madeira whose numbers greatly increased in the decades following World War II. Madeiran immigrants, who are traditionally associated with horticulture and commerce, form the largest group within South Africa's Portuguese community.

The largest single event of Portuguese settlement occurred when the former Portuguese colonies became independent in 1975. Most of them went to Portugal and Brazil, but a significant number of black and white refugees from Angola and Mozambique made their way to South Africa. Their arrival made South Africa the home of the largest Portuguese African population, increasing it from about 49,000, to 300,000.

Rosettenville in Johannesburg was a significant hub for white Portuguese immigrants between the 1940s and 1980s, they were mostly from mainland Portugal. It is estimated that in this period, 50 000 Portuguese-speakers moved into the area. After Angola and Mozambique gained independence from Portugal in 1976 and 1975, many Portuguese Mozambicans and White Angolans settled in the area. The area became known as 'Little Portugal', with residents celebrating their shared heritage in a number of ways including food and festivals. 10 June, Portugal Day was also celebrated there. By 1981, Portuguese was being taught in sixteen public schools in South Africa and there were 42 Portuguese social clubs operating in the country.

Woodstock in Cape Town became the first suburb in the city where a distinct Portuguese, ethnic community developed. The Portuguese population in the city increased from 228 immigrants in 1936 to 1649 immigrants by 1970. A total of 675 of these immigrants, coming from Madeira, settled in Woodstock between 1940-1980 and the area earned the nickname "Little Madeira." Portuguese fishermen settled in the suburb in the 1930s and became known as the "pioneers" of the Portuguese diaspora in the Cape. They chose to settled in Woodstock for its location close to the harbour and for its relative affordability.

== Politics and economics ==
The Portuguese South African community is highly active within the South African community, both politically and economically. Notable members include Maria Ramos who was the former director general of South Africa's National Treasury and later Group CEO of ABSA, one of South Africa's largest financial services companies. Other Portuguese involvement within the business community includes companies like Mercantile Bank. The community is also actively involved in investment activities with other Southern African countries like Angola and Mozambique.

Nando's is a South African multinational fast casual restaurant chain that specialises in Portuguese flame-grilled, peri-peri style chicken. The restaurant was founded in 1987 in Rosettenville, Johannesburg by Portuguese-born Fernando Duarte and South African-born Robert Brozin. Upon visiting a Portuguese Mozambican takeaway named Chickenland and trying the chicken with peri peri, they bought the restaurant for about 80,000 rand (equivalent to about £25,000 at the time), renaming the restaurant Nando's after Fernando's firstborn son.

Socially, the Portuguese community have held an annual festival called Lusito Land (the second largest festival in South Africa).

== Religion ==
Most Portuguese, like other South Africans, are Christians. Most of them are Roman Catholics, although there is a Protestant minority.

== Sports ==
=== Soccer ===
The most popular sport with Portuguese South Africans is football. There are many football clubs in South Africa that are of Portuguese origin. One example was the professional football club Vasco Da Gama which dissolved in 2016. Football is a favourite pastime for Portuguese youth in South Africa, and many of them tend to join amateur and professional football clubs in the country.

== Geography ==
Due to Portuguese exploration and navigation many points of interest on the South African coast have Portuguese names.

- KwaZulu-Natal
- Cape Agulhas
- Benguela Current
- Agulhas Current
- Dias Cross
- Da Gama Cross
- L'Agulhas
- Agulhas National Park
- Saldanha Bay
- St Lucia, KwaZulu-Natal
- Algoa Bay
- St. Croix Island
- St Helena Bay

== Notable Portuguese South Africans ==
- João Albasini (1813–1888)
- Basil D'Oliveira (1931-2011), a cricketer known for initiating the D'Oliveira affair
- Manuel de Freitas, Member of Parliament, Shadow Minister of Tourism since 2019, Shadow Minister of Transport from 2014 to 2019, Shadow Minister of Home Affairs from 2012 to 2014, Shadow Deputy Minister of Transport from 2009 to 2012, previously councillor in the City of Johannesburg and also a Member of the Gauteng Provincial Legislature.
- Trevor Manuel, former Minister of Finance and Minister in the Presidency for the National Planning Commission
- Jeannie de Gouveia (better known as Jeannie D), TV presenter and media personality
- Roger De Sá, former footballer and coach
- Edgar Fernando Ferreira Maia (Born 1986), Blade master in martial arts
- Vanessa Do Céu Carreira, Miss South Africa 2001
- Mike dos Santos, strategist, dancer and writer
- Fernando Duarte, co-founder of Nando's
- Sonia Esgueira, actress and writer of the satirical comedies "Porra" and "Porralicious"
- Manny Fernandes, professional boxing promoter
- Frank Pereira, former footballer
- Maria Ramos, Chief Executive Officer of Barclays Africa Group Limited
- Marilyn Ramos, Miss South Africa 2012
- Paula Reto, professional golfer
- João Silva, photographer
- Lee Cole, singer and songwriter
- Colonel Ignatius Ferreira, played a prominent role in the development of Johannesburg
- Costa Titch, amapiano artist
- Manuel Escórcio a South African tenor
- Danny Roxo, was a Portuguese hunter, safari guide, and soldier.
- Deon Ferreira, was a South African Army officer. He served as Chief of Joint Operations before his retirement.
- Zak Calisto, billionaire founder and CEO of Cartrack and Karooo.
- Damian de Allende, professional rugby union player

== See also ==
- Portuguese Africans
  - Portuguese Angolans
  - Portuguese Mozambicans
- Portuguese people
- White South Africans
- White Africans
- Portuguese Americans
- Portugal–South Africa relations
