= Portuguese Africans =

Ethnic group

United Nations geoscheme for Africa Eastern Africa Central Africa Northern Africa Southern Africa Western Africa

Portuguese Africans (Portuguese: luso-africanos) are Portuguese people born or permanently settled in Africa (they should not be confused with Portuguese of Black African ancestry). The largest Portuguese African population lives in Portugal numbering over 1 million with large and important minorities living in South Africa, Namibia and the Portuguese-speaking African countries (Angola, Cape Verde, Guinea-Bissau, Mozambique, São Tomé and Príncipe and Equatorial Guinea).The descendants of the Portuguese settlers who were born and "raised" locally since Portuguese colonial time were called crioulos. Much of the original population is unnumbered having been assimilated into Portugal, Brazil, and other countries.

Some from Angola or Mozambique went to South Africa, Malawi, Namibia, Zimbabwe, Botswana, the United States, Brazil or Europe. Most Portuguese Africans are Portuguese-South Africans, and Portuguese Angolans, mainly as a result of direct migration from Portugal, namely from Madeira.

== PALOP countries ==
The overwhelming majority of Portuguese Africans are found in countries where Portuguese enjoys the status of official language. This is due to historical, linguistic and cultural reasons. They are commonly known as "PALOP". The acronym "PALOP" stands for "Países Africanos de Língua Oficial Portuguesa" in Portuguese, which translates to "African Countries with Portuguese as the Official Language" in English.

Guinea-Bissau became an independent country in 1974, followed by the rest of the colonies in 1975. Most Portuguese residents, for this reason, returned to Portugal, where they were called retornados.

When the Community of Portuguese Language Countries (CPLP) was founded in 1996, some Portuguese and a number of Brazilians of Portuguese ethnic background arrived for providing economic and educational aid to the Portuguese-speaking African countries. Some of these people of Portuguese background adopted Africa as their permanent home.

== Western Africa ==
Excluding Cape Verde and Guinea-Bissau (Portuguese-speaking African countries), there aren't large Portuguese communities in Western African countries.

=== Benin ===
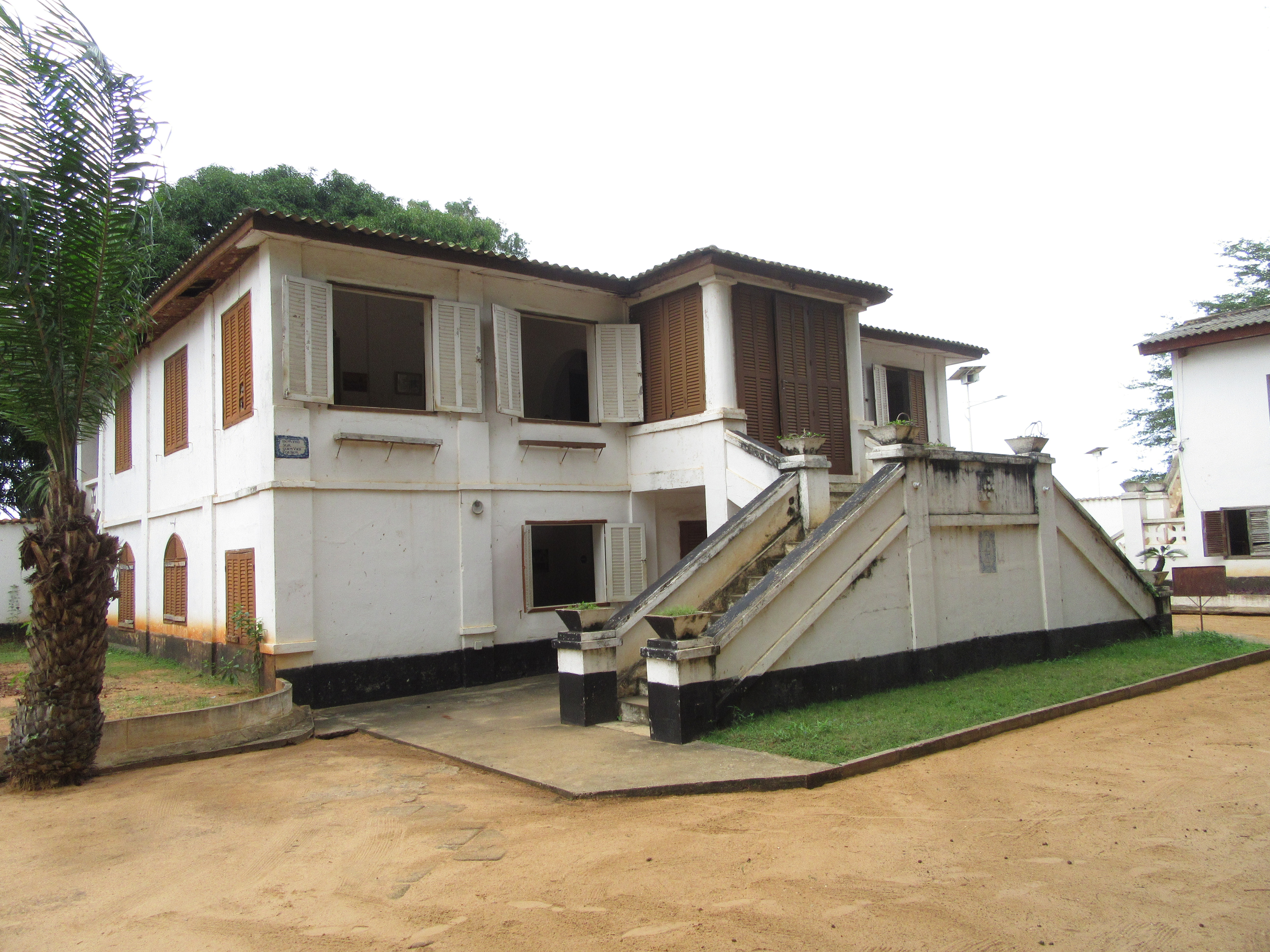
Portuguese fort in Benin, Ouidah

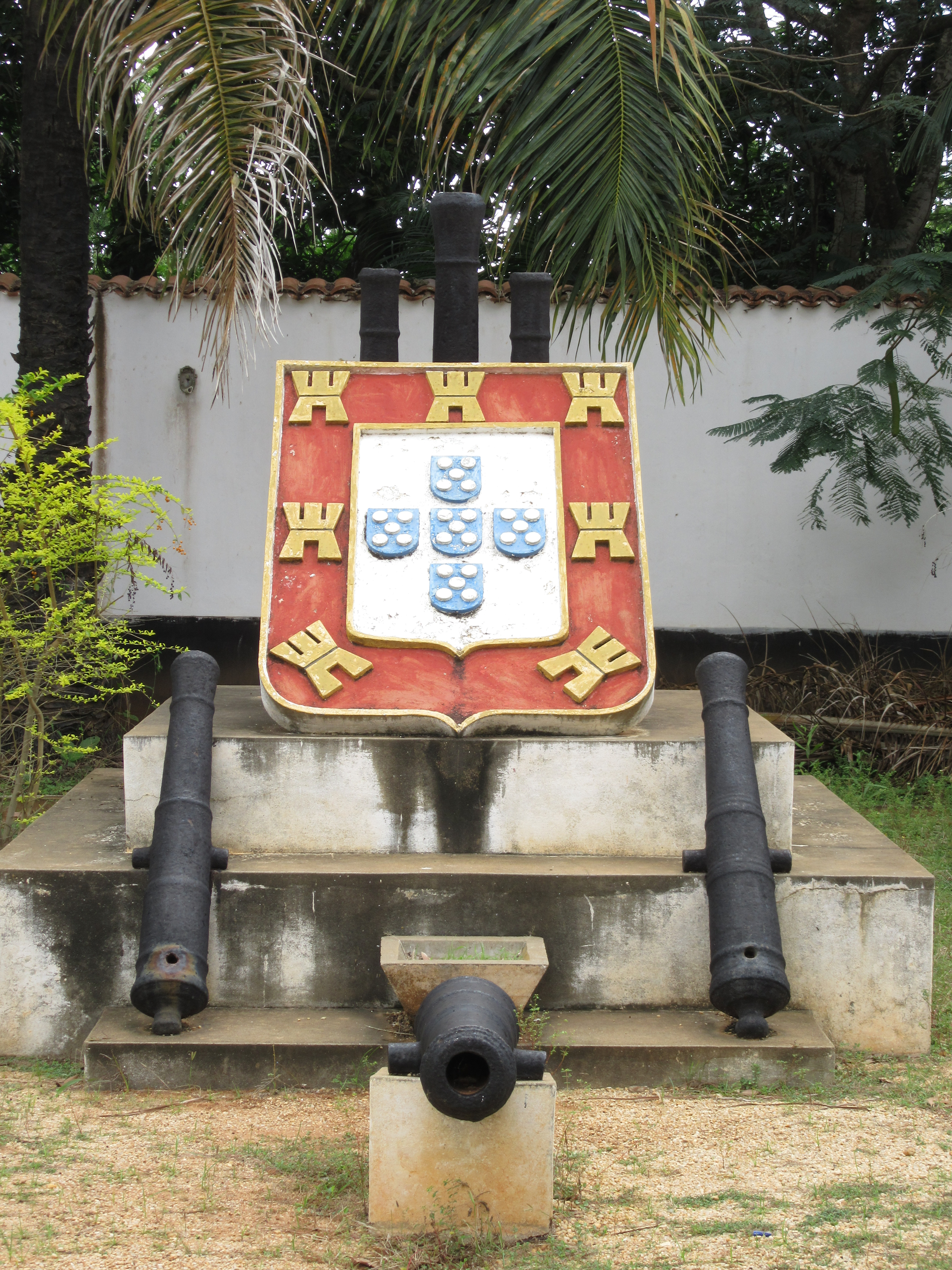
Portuguese vestiges in Benin

In Benin, despite there not being nor Portuguese diplomatic representation neither an expressive Portuguese community, there is a remembrance of the Portuguese community once settled there.

Benin was where ancient and illustrious civilizations which developed from city-states were located. Local kingdoms such as the kingdoms of Aladá - founded in the 12th century - or that of Dahomey - established in 1600 - developed local trade which, from the 16th century onwards, was based on the slave trade and, after the abolition of the trade in 1807, on palm oil . This economy facilitated the establishment, on the coast known as the Slave Coast, of trading posts for the Europeans, namely the Portuguese, the first to arrive in the region and to do business with coastal rulers.

The Europeans developed forts on the coast as military bases in order to impose a military threat on the coastal ethnic groups so that they would supply them with slaves (even if it was gold that mainly interested the Portuguese, during the first colonizing settlements) in the Gulf of Guinea.

In particular, the Portuguese fort in Ouidah (São João Baptista de Ajudá) is still standing at was transformed into a history museum by the African country's government. Ouidah, a Portuguese exclave until 1961 and a former port for the slave trade, was returned to the newly independent state of Benin one year after the French granted it its independence.

Also, the country's capital Porto-Novo, draws its name from the Portuguese city of Porto, a reminder of when the Portuguese settled there in 1752; Porto-Novo is the Portuguese name of "New Porto".

=== Burkina Faso ===
The Portuguese community in Burkina Faso, on the other hand, seems to be continuously decreasing since relations were formally established in 1992. Even though there has never been a significative Portuguese presence in the country, as of the 2014 uprising there were 20 Portuguese living in the African nation. Due to the political instability and the death of two Portuguese nationals in 2016, the community has decreased to 5 people only, according to data released in the occasion of the 2022 coup. Despite the recent issues and the fact that Portugal doesn't have an official representation in Ouagadougou, relations, both diplomatic – the Portuguese chargé d'affaires visited Burkina Faso in 2023 – and cultural, are strengthening. Between 2008 and 2012 and again between 2015 and 2019, the coach of the Burkina Faso national football team was Portuguese football coach Paulo Duarte.

Interestingly, the ancient name for the country "Haute Volta" in French and used up until 1984 comes from Portuguese. The name was given by Portuguese gold traders from Ghana. Volta, with the meaning of "to turn", "turn". The river was their exploratory limit before turning back (voltar); on the other hand, the name could also refer to the numerous meanders that characterize a good part of the course water.

=== Gambia ===
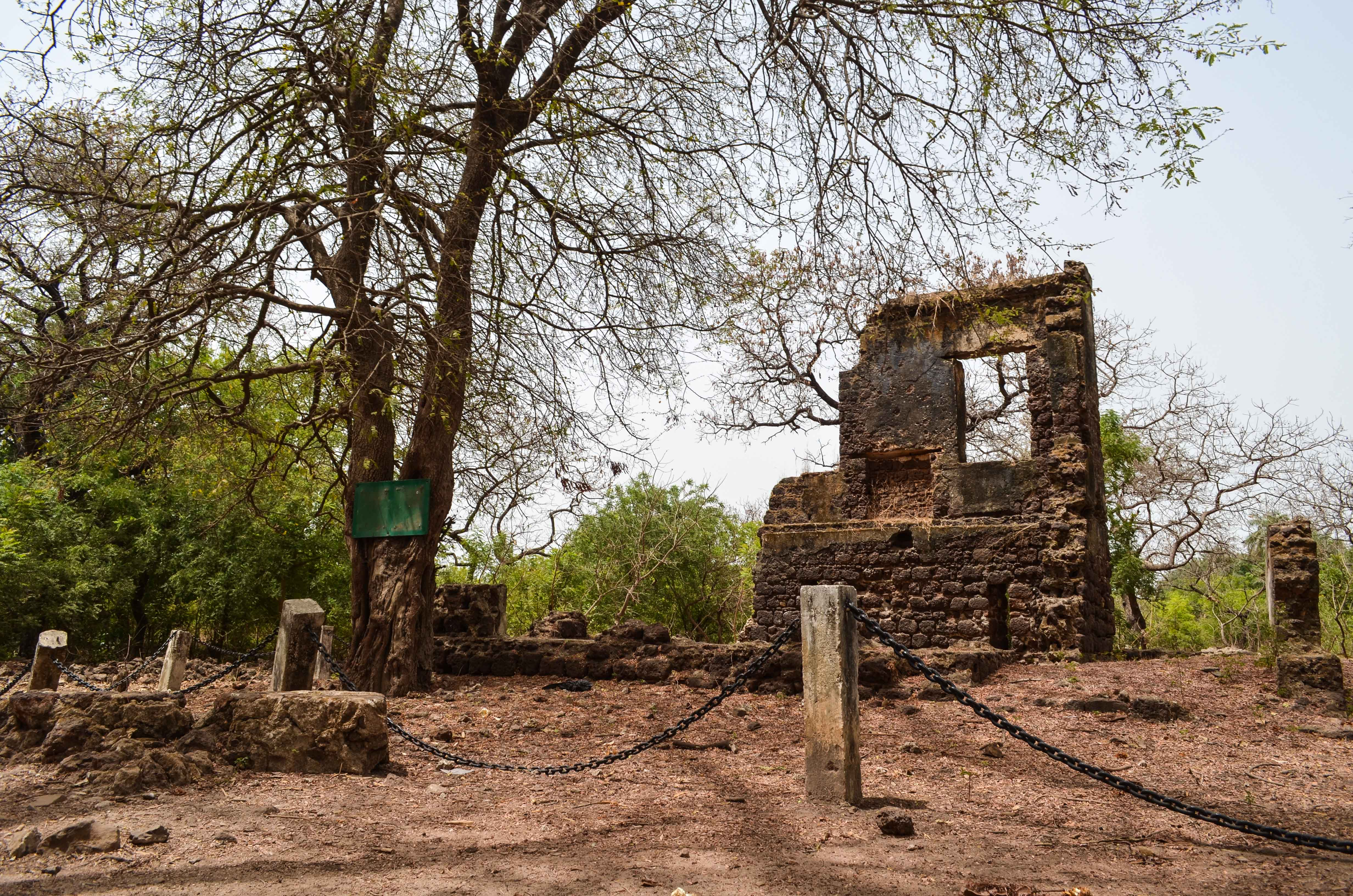
Ruins of San Domingo, Kunta Kinteh Island and Related Sites

Relations between Portugal and the Gambia aren't very strong: only 6 Portuguese are officially registered as living in the Gambia and the bilateral trade amounts to a little over 2 million € per year. There is no Portuguese embassy in the country but there are direct flights connecting Lisbon to Banjul though. Since 2018 Portugal is active in humanitarian projects in the country along with other EU states such as Germany and Belgium.

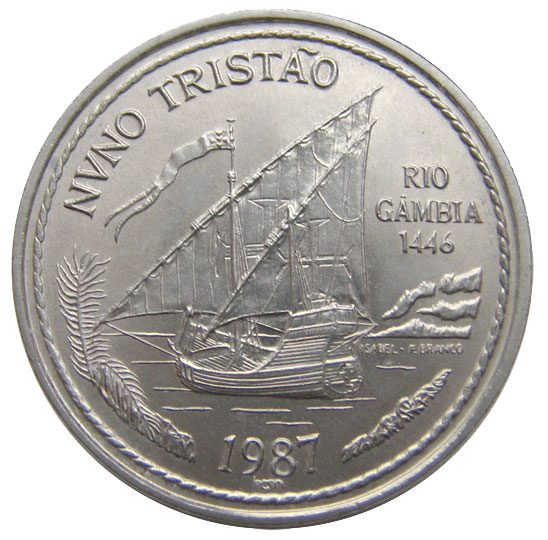
100 escudos coin commemorating the fifth centennial since the arrival of Nuno Tristão in the Gambia

Relations between Portugal and Gambia, despite not being particularly significant today, date back to the 15th century; in fact, even the country's name comes from the Portuguese word for trade, cambio. The Portuguese brought Christianity to the country and built the first church in Gambia: today an estimated 2% of Gambians is Catholic. Portuguese explorer Nuno Tristão and Venetian Luiz de Cadamosto as well as Genoese trader Antoniotto Usodimare (both sailing for Portugal) were the first Europeans exploring the Gambia river.

They arrived at the River Gambia in June 1455 and proceeded a short way upstream. They repeated the voyage the next year in May 1456, proceeding further upstream and making contact with some of the native chiefs. When they were near the river's mouth, they cast anchor at an island where one of their sailors, who had previously died of a fever, was buried. As his name was Andrew, they named the island St Andrew's Island.

Following this expedition, the Portuguese made endeavors to establish a settlement along the riverbanks. However, none of these settlements attained significant proportions, and a considerable number of settlers intermarried with the indigenous population. Despite such intermingling, these settlers adhered to Portuguese attire and traditions, maintaining their Christian faith. Communities of Portuguese lineage persisted in the Gambia until the 18th century, with Portuguese churches established in San Domingo, Geregia, and Tankular by 1730. Another Portuguese settlement further up the river was established at Setuku near Fattatenda. Towards the close of the 16th century, the Songhai Empire, subject to persistent Portuguese incursions, eventually succumbed to collapse.

Following the seizure of the Portuguese throne by Philip II in 1580, a contingent of Portuguese individuals sought sanctuary in England. Among these refugees was Francisco Ferreira, who, in 1587, captained two English vessels to the Gambia, returning with a lucrative cargo comprising hides and ivory. In 1588, António, Prior of Crato, asserting a claim to the Portuguese throne, granted London and Devon merchants the exclusive trading rights between the Rivers Senegal and Gambia. This privilege was formally ratified for a decade through letters patent issued by Queen Elizabeth I. Despite dispatching numerous ships to the region, these merchants, deterred by Portuguese animosity, refrained from venturing south beyond Joal, situated 30 miles north of the river mouth. Their accounts depicted the Gambia as "a river of clandestine commerce and wealth concealed by the Portuguese." Presently, in the Gambia, approximately 1% of the population, or 25,000 individuals, still converse in a Portuguese creole. The Portuguese culture and Portuguese creole in The Gambia are closely related to the one Casamance region of Senegal, the country that surrounds Gambia.

=== Ghana ===
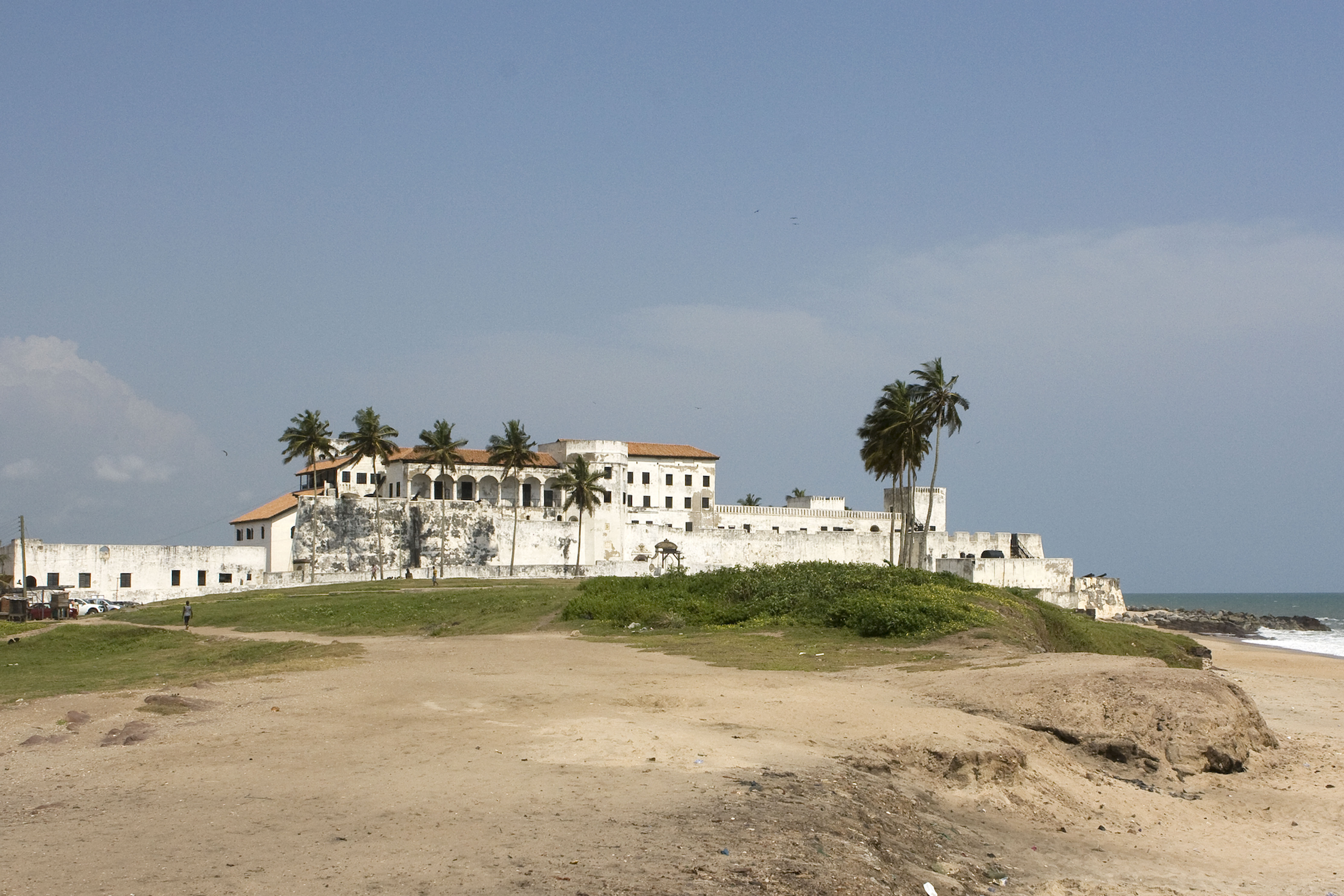
Elmina Castle, Ghana

Although small – standing at 200 people – the Portuguese community in Ghana is among the largest in Western Africa. The Portuguese are mostly active in construction and volunteering. Although relations aren't strong today – despite a recent increase in trade- the Portuguese were the first Europeans arriving in Ghana, which they called "Costa de Ouro" or "Gold Coast". The name would later be used by the Britons to name their colony. In fact, the Portuguese were active in the gold and slave trade in nowadays Ghana. In particular, the most notable element of Portuguese heritage in Ghana is Elmina Castle, a fort built in 1482 as Castelo de São Jorge da Mina. It was the first trading post built on the Gulf of Guinea, the oldest European building in existence south of the Sahara and one of the most important stops on the route of the Atlantic slave trade. Elmina Castle is a historical site, and was a major filming location for Werner Herzog's 1987 drama film Cobra Verde. The castle is recognized by UNESCO as a World Heritage Site, along with other castles and forts in Ghana, because of its testimony to the Atlantic slave trade. It is a major tourist attraction in the Central Region of Ghana.

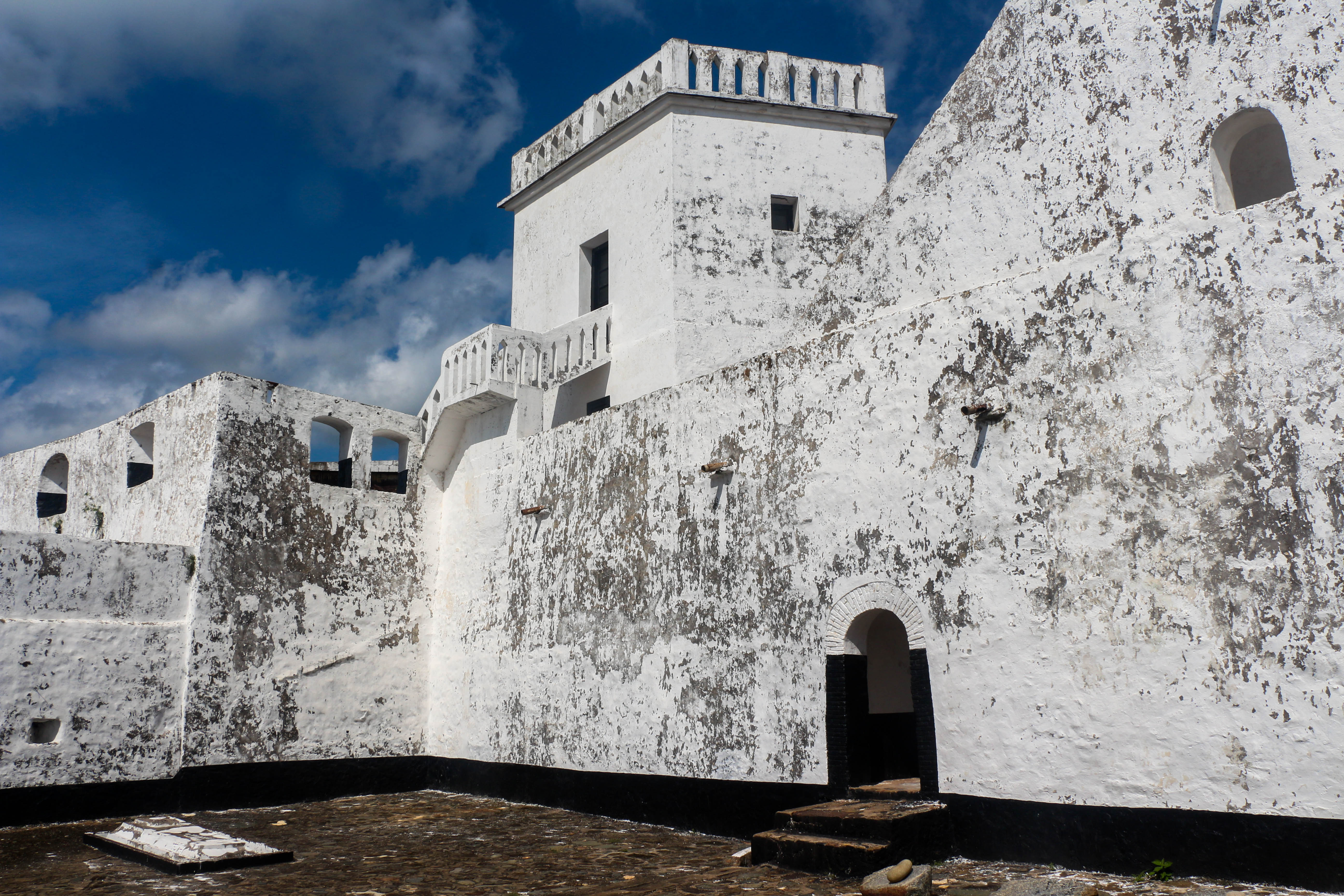
Fort Saint Anthony at Axim, Ghana, built by the Portuguese in 1515

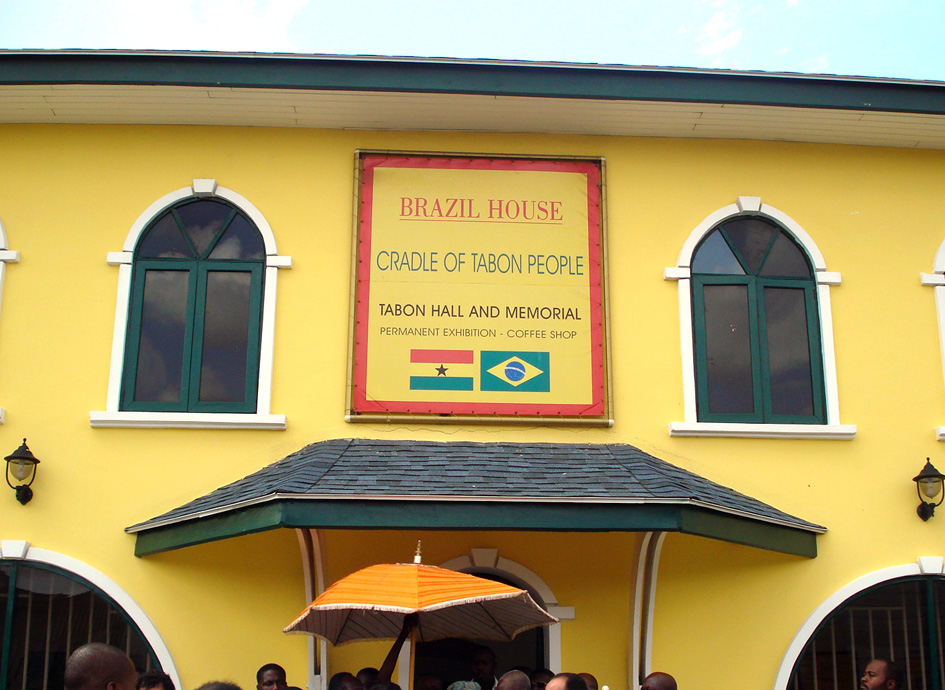
Brazil House in Accra, Ghana, established by the Tabom people

The Portuguese linguistic influences in Ghana are nearly nonexistent, likely due to the fortress serving solely as a trading post in the slave trade, where individuals were, for instance, exchanged for gold. Being precisely a crucial center for the gold trade, interactions between the few Portuguese residents and the local villagers were prohibited to prevent illicit commerce or smuggling. In 1637, the fortress was seized by the Dutch. The Gold Coast slaves came from the Benin-Elmina route, supplying Portuguese with cotton, cloth, and beads. Gold, primarily from Ghana, became the main export. The introduction of foreign crops globalized agriculture, and Portuguese remained the dominant language of exchange along the Gulf Coast even after other European powers arrived post-1642 cession. The Portuguese initiated the internal African slave trade, laying the foundation for later human trafficking networks exploited by the Dutch and British during the Atlantic slave trade. Portuguese shipping prowess fostered long-distance river trading in West African states, boosting Gulf of Guinea trade. This stimulated boatbuilding and seamanship, with Portuguese creole emerging as a key trade language, second only to Portuguese. Intermarriage resulted in a substantial mixed-race population along the Gold Coast. Urbanization around Elmina was prompted by Portuguese efforts to establish a municipality. Native governors, or braffos, gained Portuguese-sanctioned authority, leading to increased migration from the interior. Maize and cassava, introduced by the Portuguese through trans-Atlantic trade, thrived and became West African dietary staples. Portuguese influence integrated the Gold Coast into the global economy, centralizing smaller states into larger political entities. Increased trade volume in coastal cities connected inland African communities with European trade, shaping the region's economic landscape.

=== Guinea ===
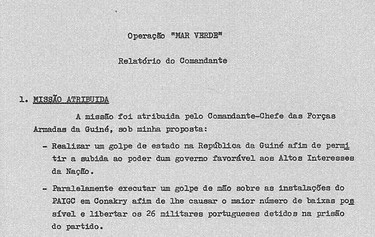
Report on the Operation Green Sea, a 1970 Portuguese military attack in Guinea

In Guinea there are around 60 resident Portuguese citizens as of 2020. According to the Portuguese Foreign Ministry, there were up to 300 Portuguese living in the country in 2000 but political instability made many of those once living in the Western African country migrating back to Portugal.

=== Ivory Coast ===
The number of Portuguese citizens in the largest French-speaking Western African country is hard to estimate due to lack of official data, while the number of Portuguese descendants is virtually impossible to obtain due to centuries of intermingle with local people. While it was estimated that in 2001 around 100 Portuguese nationals lived in Ivory Coast, the latest consular data available suggest that in 2008 there were 34 Portuguese citizens living in Ivory Coast as well as 28 Portuguese-born people. It is nonetheless noteworthy that, during an official state visit in 2019, it was said there were around 200 Portuguese citizens living in Ivory Coast.

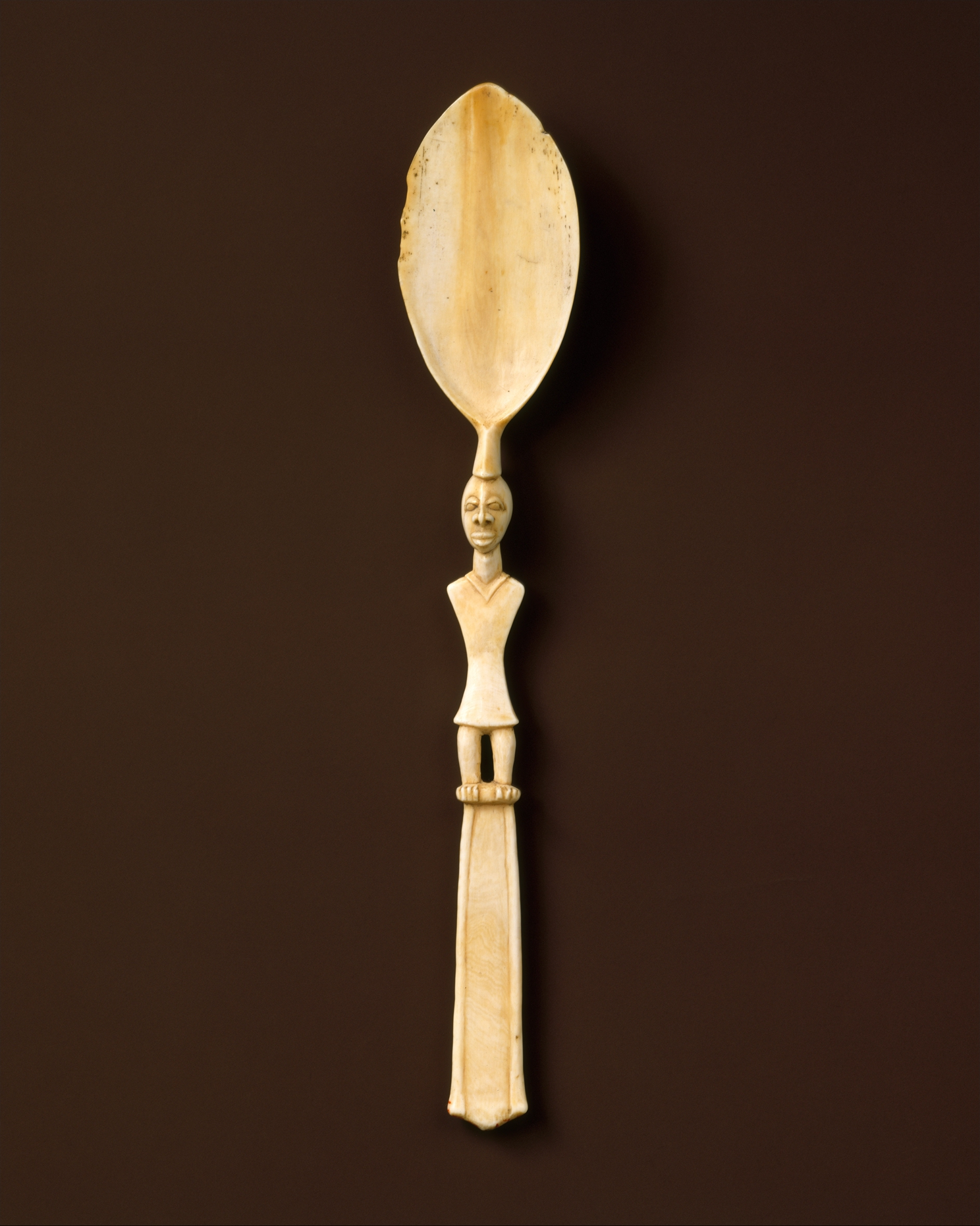
Sapi-Portuguese Ivory Spoon, now at the Met.

Nowadays, the relations between the two countries are expanding, after being severed with the start of the French colonisation of the country in the 19th century and being in a state of "near lethargy" - according to the Ivorian embassy in Lisbon - up until 2014. In 2016 the diplomatic representation of Côte d'Ivoire in Portugal opened, aiming at “building an ambitious and prosperous partnership between the two countries”. In the same year five trade agreements were signed, and in 2017 a Portuguese delegation went to Ivory Coast to boost economic relations and in the same year Ivorian president Ouattara went to Lisbon for a state visit. In 2019, during a state visit to Ivory Coast, 4 important economic agreements between the two countries were signed. It'probable that the Portuguese community in the country, especially entrepreneurs, will grow. Starting from 2020, visits of ambassadors and institutional figures also intensified, despite some minor diplomatic incidents, namely involving the Ivorian embassy in Lisbon. In addition, the Chamber of Commerce and Industry Portugal - Ivory Coast (CCIPCM) was created, so as to facilitate Portuguese business in the country and cooperation agreements between cities of Viseu and Douro districts and Ivorian towns were signed. The cooperation that emerged in recent years also expanded to the cultural domain: there is now the possibility of graduating in Portuguese for Ivorian students in Ivory Coast, film festivals have been created and during the 2019 state visit in Ivory Coast by the Portuguese President of the Republic Marcelo Rebelo de Sousa it was announced "it was time for Ivory Coast to host a Portuguese school". In 2023 the Portuguese embassy in the country reopened, promising to increase the cooperation between the two countries even further.

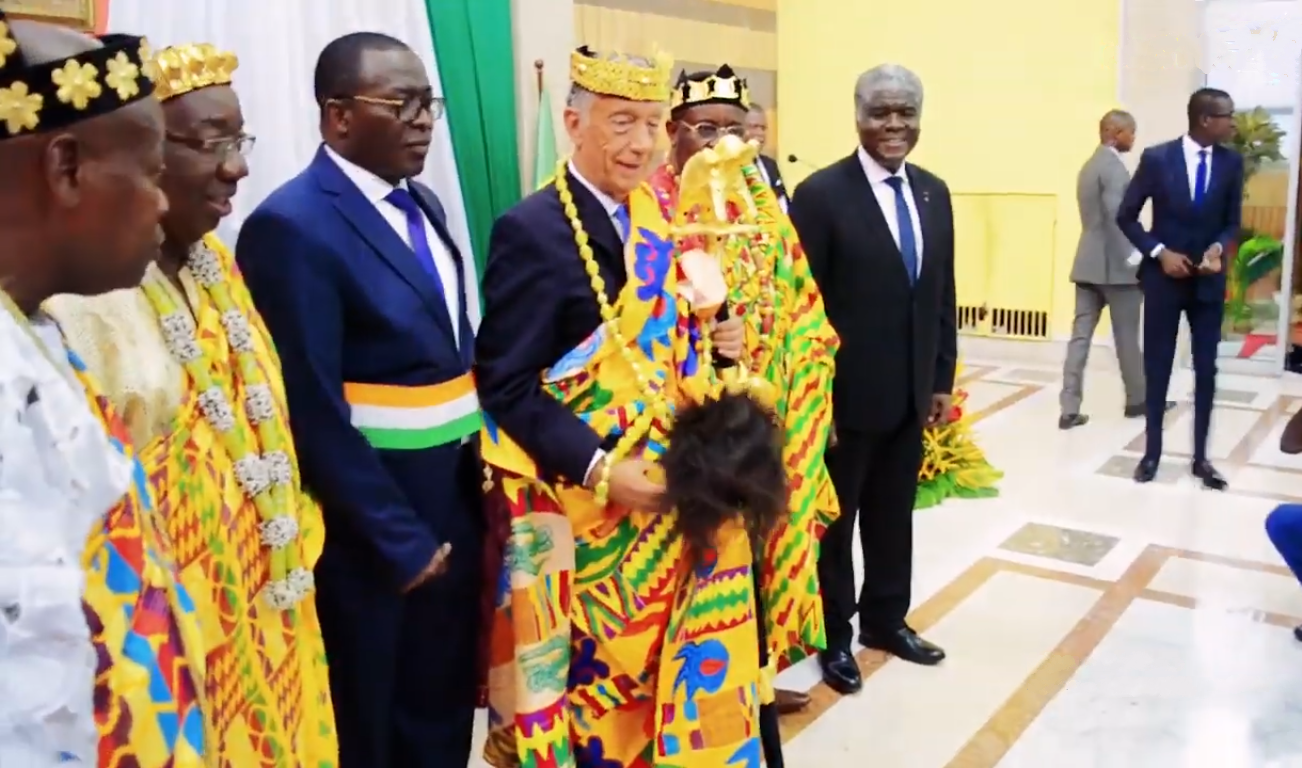
Marcelo Rebelo de Sousa crowned traditional chief in Côte d'Ivoire, 2019

Because of its location between Europe and the imagined treasures of the Far East, Africa became a destination for the European explorers of the 15th century. The first Europeans to explore the West African coast were Portuguese sailors, traveling along the African coast, looking for the route to India. Pedro Escobar (in the service of Fernão Gomes) would have been the first European to set foot in Sassandra and Grand-Bassam in 1469. Soeiro da Costa would have settled in San-Pédro.

The Portuguese named the country "Costa do Marfim" (ivory coast) for the amount of ivory they found. The trade in ivory, guns and the slave trade quickly took hold. This very trade led the elephants in the area to extinction, so much so that this trade ceased completely at the beginning of the eighteenth century. The ports of San-Pédro, Sassandra and Fresco have retained the names of Portuguese sailors or ships.

=== Liberia ===
The Portuguese presence in Liberia isn't expressive, and only 1 Portuguese was registered as living in the country as of 2008. It is nonetheless interesting to point out that relations between the two countries date from a long time, with Portuguese explorer Pedro de Sintra establishing contacts with people of the land later known as "Liberia" as early as 1461. They named the area Costa da Pimenta (Pepper Coast), or Grain Coast, because of the abundance of melegueta pepper, which became desired in European cooking. Duarte Pacheco Pereira describes the region in his work "Esmeraldo de situ orbis," which came to be known as the "Pepper Coast" due to the abundance of pepper grains in the area, the main commercial product of the region. In 1462 the explorations went even further with Soeiro da Costa, who sailed in the Cavalla River.

=== Mali ===
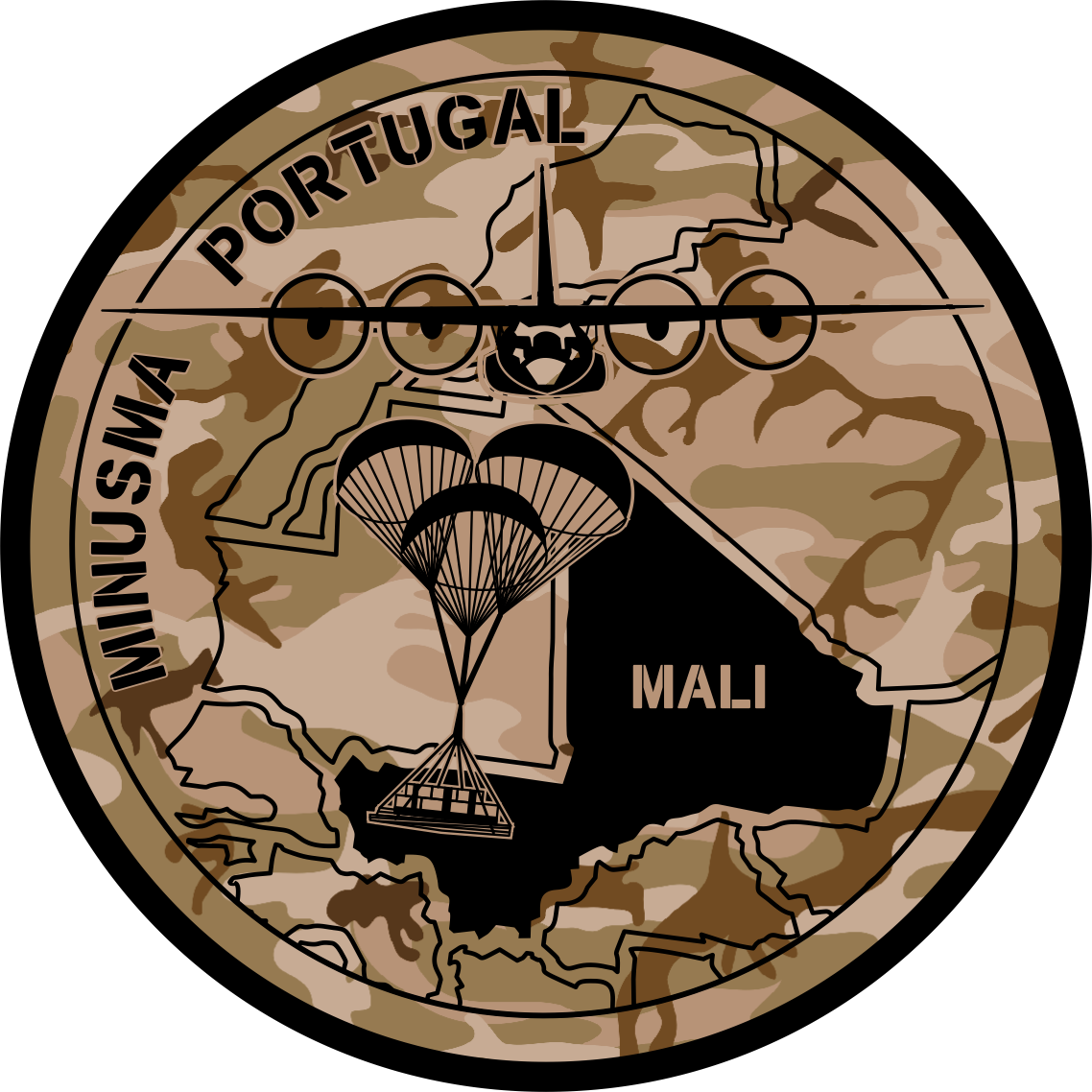
Mission patch for United Nations' Portuguese Forces in MINUSMA

The Portuguese community in Mali is also particularly small and shrinking due to the political instability in the country. For instance, in 2012 a French-Portuguese citizen was taken hostage while in 2017 a Portuguese was killed by a terrorist attack. In 2012, around 20 Portuguese citizens were rescued from Bamako due to the political crisis in the African country and taken to Lisbon through a TAP Air Portugal charter flight. Moreover, the Portuguese embassy as well as the direct connection between Lisbon and Bamako have been recently closed. Due to Portugal being part of numerous international coalitions, 76 Portuguese soldiers are active in Mali, mostly to fight terrorism and to train the local army; in particular, Portugal leads the EU mission in Mali since 2018. The Portuguese have also moved a C-295M aircraft to the country. The Portuguese military involvement in Mali was especially asked by the French government, with the first soldiers sent in 2015.

It is nonetheless worth noting that the first contact between Portuguese and Malian authorities dates from 1534, when the Portuguese sent a delegation to the African country. The Portuguese arrived in Mali at the beginning of the 15th century, traded with the Mali Empire while participating in its weakening because, to encourage their trade, particularly in slaves, they supported the small coastal communities and pushed them to emancipate themselves.

=== Mauritania ===
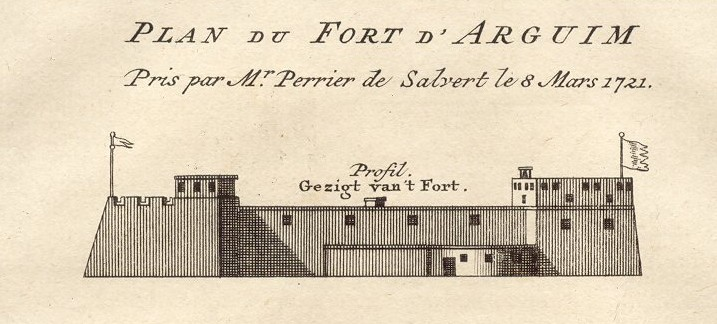
The Portuguese fort of Arguin

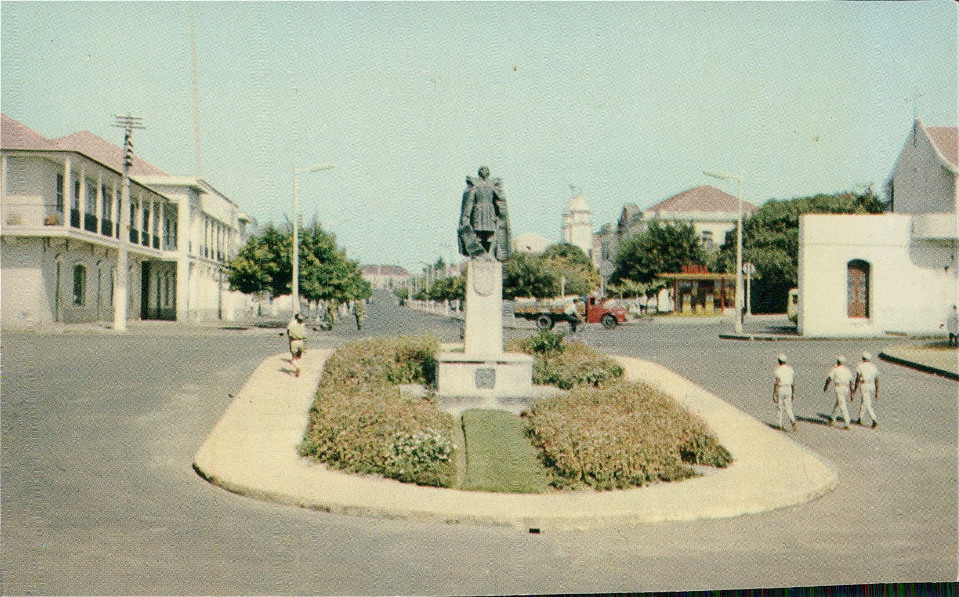
Monument to Nuno Tristão in Bissau

A small Portuguese community also exists in Mauritania. The latest data (2014) suggest that only 5 Portuguese live in the country. Portuguese people used to have a larger presence but their numbers have decreased due to political instability, especially after the 2008 coup, when there were at least 30 Portuguese working in construction. In 2013 a Portuguese citizen was arrested and another was evacuated from the country. A notable Portuguese living in Mauritania is artist Isabel Fiadeiro, considered a reference for Nouakchott cultural landscape. Despite relations between Nouakchott and Lisbon aren't significant (although a visit of the Portuguese chargé d'affaires to Mauritania in 2023 is set to deepen bilateral ties in the near future). Nowadays the cooperation between the two countries revolves mostly around fishing and military training.

Despite today's relations aren't strong, it is worth noting that the Portuguese extensively explored the country's coast starting in the 15th century. In particular, the Portuguese settled the island of Arguin (Arabic: أرغين, Portuguese: Arguim), first visited by the Portuguese explorer Nuno Tristão, in 1443. They occupied nowadays Ras Nouadhibou (Cabo Branco) as well. In 1445, Prince Henry the Navigator set up a trading post on the island of Arguin, which acquired gum arabic and slaves for Portugal. By 1455, 800 slaves were shipped from Arguin to Portugal every year. The island would later be lost to the Netherlands in 1633, during the Dutch-Portuguese War. The Dutch destroyed the Portuguese fort in 1728, upon abandoning the island. Arguin – now part of the Banc d'Arguin National Park – is also the place in which in July 1816, the French frigate Méduse, bound for Senegal, wrecked. The event is particularly famous because of the Le Radeau de la Méduse painting by Théodore Géricault. The Portuguese were also present in Ouadane (now a Unesco World Heritage site) starting from 1475.

=== Niger ===
Niger also had a small Portuguese community but after the rise in political instability in the country especially after the COVID-19 pandemic and the 2023 coup most left. At least 10 Portuguese were rescued by French troops and sent to Paris. Historically, Agadez, once an important center for the gold trade, was penalized by the shift of commercial traffic from the Sahara to the coastal ports controlled by the Portuguese; its population decreased, from 30,000 inhabitants in 1450 to less than 3000 at the beginning of the 20th century.

=== Nigeria ===
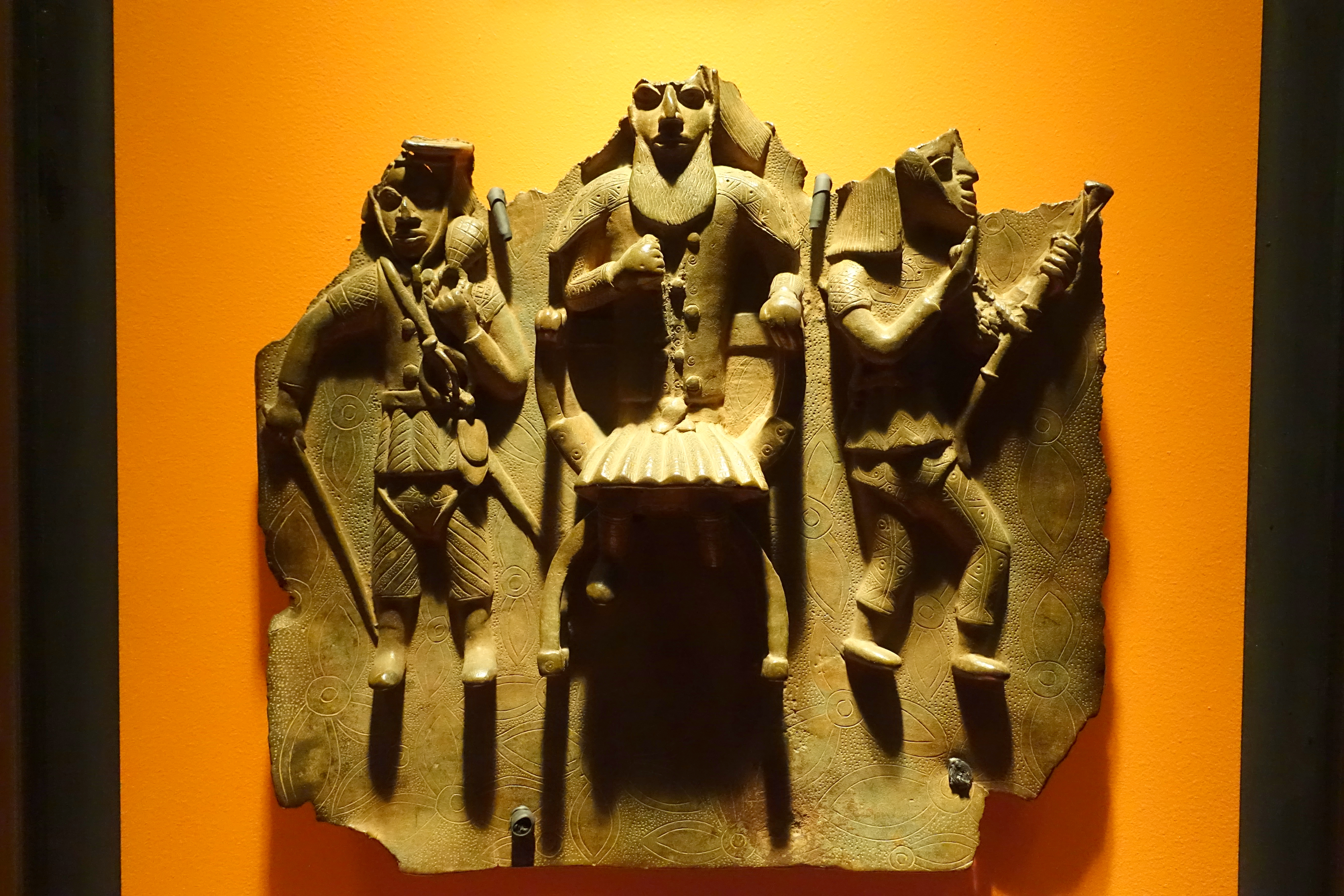
Nigerian bronze depiction of three Portuguese, 16th century. Now in Stockholm, Sweden (Museum of Ethnography)

In Nigeria, despite it being by far the largest country not only in Western Africa but in the whole continent by population, the Portuguese community is almost non-existent: for the 2022 Portuguese legislative election only 94 citizens were registered as living in Nigeria. It is nonetheless noteworthy that, accorsing to consular figures, 170 Portuguese were living in the African country. Many work in construction and as football trainers. Despite the big economic potential of Nigeria, political instability and insecurity dampen the attractiveness of the country as a place to settle for Portuguese nationals. For instance, 3 Portuguese were kidnapped between 2008 and 2017 and one was also killed despite the ransom having been paid.

The relations between the two countries are limited but growing, as is interest towards Portuguese language in Nigeria. For instance, in 2023 a Portuguese company was chosen for a 920 million dollar project, the construction of a railway between Nigeria and Niger. Moreover, in 2022 Muhammadu Buhari announced the establishment of a dedicated Portugal Working Group, with the Minister of Industry, Trade, and Investment appointed as its head. This group aims to address specific concerns raised by investors and enhance the trade relationship between Nigeria and Portugal, that has recently reached 1 billion $ per year for the first time.

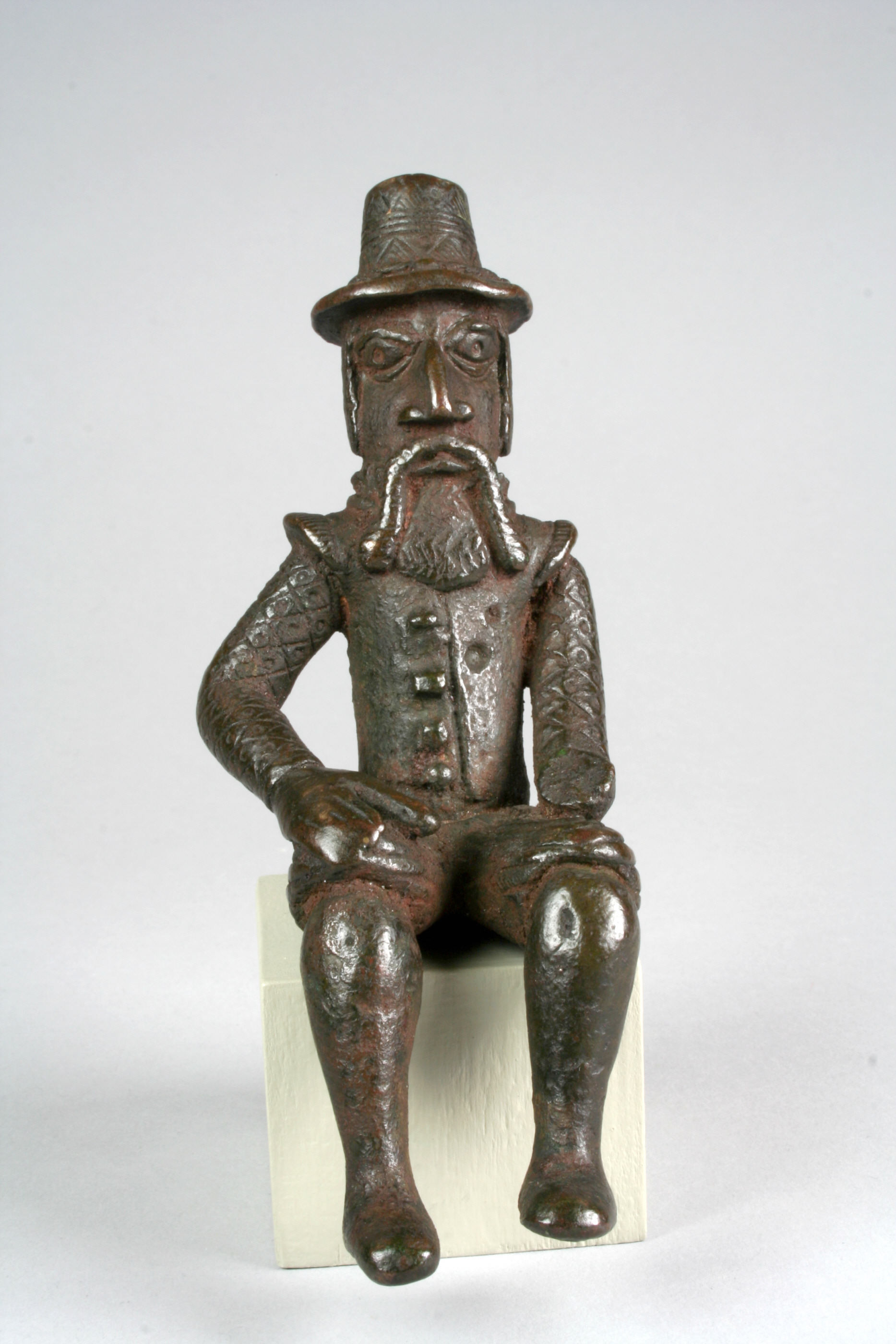
Seated figure of Portuguese male, 18th century, Edo art. Now at the Met, New York City

As is the case with most Western African countries, the Portuguese were the first Europeans who reached Nigeria. From the 15th century, European slave traders arrived in the region to purchase enslaved Africans as part of the Atlantic slave trade, which started in the region of modern-day Nigeria; the first Nigerian port used by European slave traders was Badagry, a coastal harbour. Local merchants provided them with slaves, escalating conflicts among the ethnic groups in the region and disrupting older trade patterns through the Trans-Saharan route. The port of Calabar on the historical Bight of Biafra (now commonly referred to as the Bight of Bonny) became one of the largest slave-trading posts in West Africa in the era of the Atlantic slave trade. Other major slaving ports in Nigeria were located in Lagos on the Bight of Benin, and Bonny Island on the Bight of Biafra. In particular Lagos, now the main city in Nigeria, derives its name from a Portuguese town in Algarve, also Lagos or "lakes". Other feitorias were established along the African coast, notably in the city of Lagos. The slave trade reached such magnitude that the region became known as the "Slave Coast." By 1471, Portuguese ships had descended the African coastline to the Niger River Delta. In 1481, emissaries from the King of Portugal visited the court of the Oba of Benin, with whom they maintained close ties for a period, enjoying a commercial monopoly until the end of the 16th century. Because of the Portuguese influence at the time, notable figures such as Oba Esigie spoke Portuguese. Some Nigerian chiefs also used Portuguese soldiers for raids against other tribes. In addition, a Christian kingdom of Portuguese-speaking people in Nigeria, the Kingdom of Warri, in the Niger Delta region, was founded in 1480 by the Itsekiri people. The Kingdom of Benin sent its first legacy to Portugal as early as 1483, becoming one of the first African countries to actively seek diplomatic ties with European countries.

From the 15th to the 18th century, the Itsekiri were the tribe with the most significant interaction with Portuguese navigators in the region, with Portuguese being the language of the court. In the early 16th century, many Itsekiris converted to Christianity through Portuguese missionaries. In 1680, King Olu of Warri sent his son, Antonio Domingo, to visit Portugal, and he returned years later married to a Portuguese woman. His mulatto son, Olu Erejuwa, ruled from 1720 to 1800 and established Warri's independence from the Benin Empire, which was the most powerful in Nigeria at the time. The Itsekiris thrived through the trade of ivory and slaves with the Dutch and Portuguese. To this day, they maintain a local monarchy and are one of the most influential ethnic groups in the African country.

The Portuguese heritage is still visible in some words of Nigerian pidging such as Efenrhinyen (flour, from Portuguese "farinha") or sabi (to know, from Portuguese "saber"). On the other hand, other Portuguese influence in the country, especially in architecture, is mostly not of direct Portuguese origin but of Afro-Brazilian inspiration; the Afro-Brazilians (ex-slaves from Brazil) returned the Portuguese historical past.

=== Senegal ===
In Senegal, where a Portuguese-based creole is widely spoken in Ziguinchor and wider Casamance region, there were 386 Portuguese people registered as electors in 2022. Despite in 1886 when Southern Senegal ceased being a Portuguese colony, interest towards the language remains vivid and more than 50,000 pupils are thought to be studying Portuguese at school as of 2020, a 194% increase from 2008. Moreover, around 120,000 people speak a Portuguese creole language in the country. The majority of Portuguese living in Senegal works in construction.

=== Sierra Leone ===
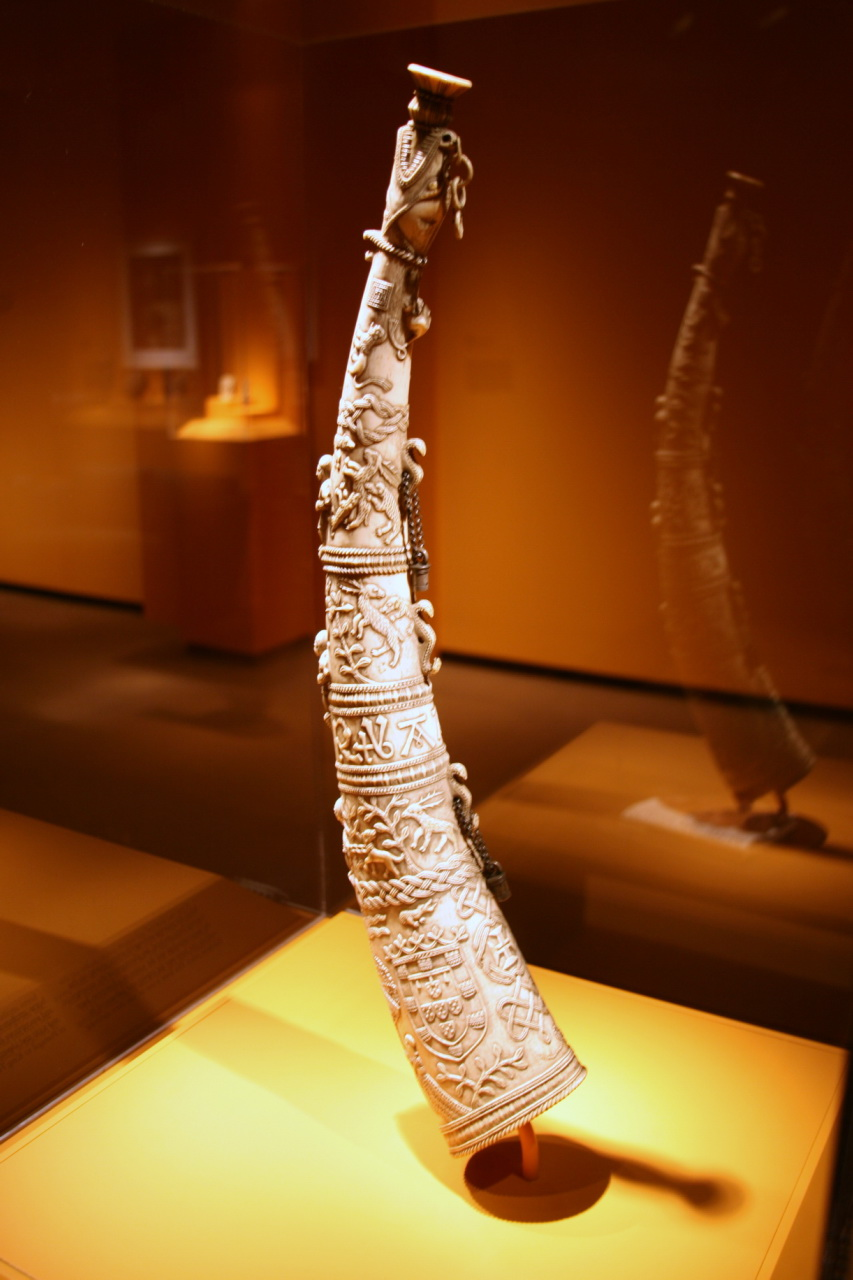
Hunting horn in Luso-African style, with the Portuguese coat of arms. From Sierra Leone, now in Washington, National Museum of African Art

Also Sierra Leone doesn't have a significant Portuguese presence nowadays and the Portuguese in the country mostly work as volunteers on a short-term basis. Trade between the two countries is limited and the country doesn't have a Portuguese mission.

Despite today's relations not being strong, the Portuguese were actually the first Europeans who visited the African country for trade purposes starting in 1462, with Portuguese explorer Pedro de Sintra. In fact, even the country's name – Sierra Leone – comes from the Portuguese Serra Lyoa (Lioness Mountain) because of the oddly shaped formation in the hills surrounding what is now Freetown Harbour.

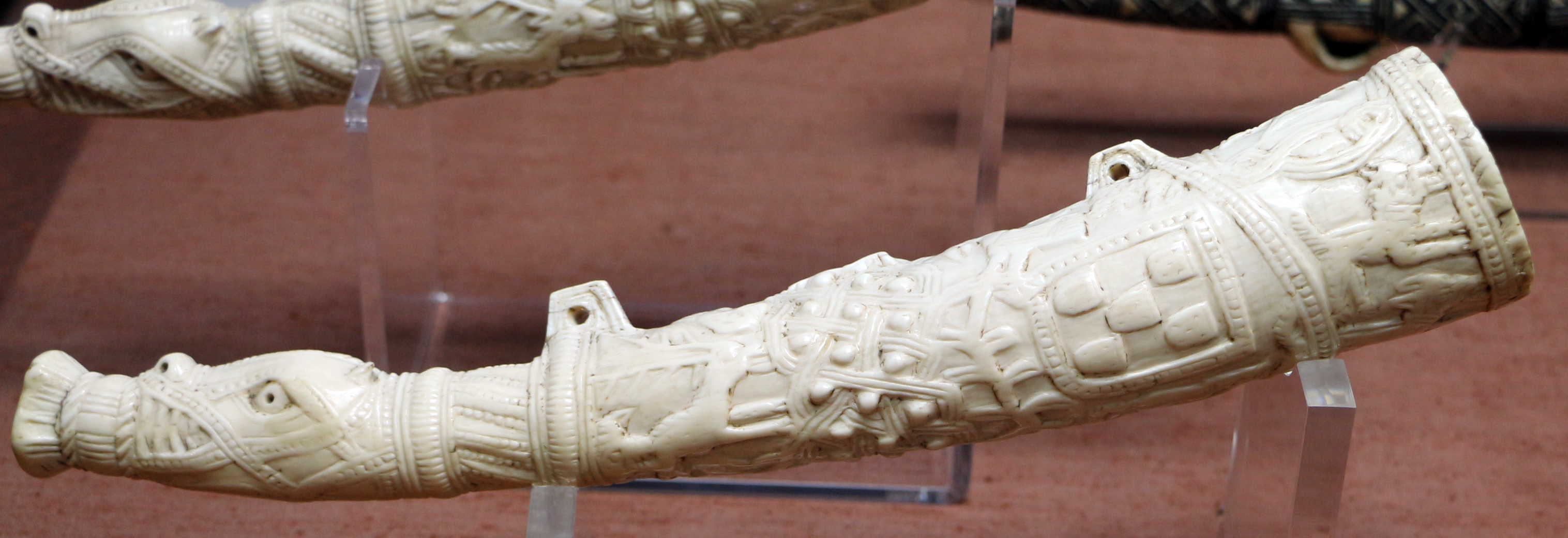
Luso-African ivory from Sierra Leone, now in MNAA, Lisbon

In the latter part of the 15th century, Portuguese vessels began making regular visits to Sierra Leone. For a period, they established a fortress on the northern shore of the Freetown estuary. The Portuguese had also a fort in Tumba, that in the 18th century was already in ruins. This estuary ranks among the world's largest natural deep-water harbours and stands out as one of the scarce well-suited harbours along the storm-beaten 'Windward Shore' of West Africa, spanning from Liberia to Senegal. It swiftly became a preferred haven for European seafarers seeking refuge and a source of potable water. Subsequently, some Portuguese sailors – including Portuguese Jews – chose to settle permanently, engaging in trade and forming matrimonial ties with the local populace.

The Portuguese also engaged in slave trade, which was already present in the region due to the lucrative trans-Saharan trade of slaves in West Africa from the 6th century that at the time of the Portuguese arrival was promoted by the Mali Empire. The slave trade was later increased with the arrival of English ships starting in the 16th century. The trade with the Portuguese - who were highly integrated in the society – involved mainly gold in form of bracelets developed the production of Luso-African ivories, objects in ivory by African or Luso-African craftsmen with elements drawn from Portuguese culture and introduced new agricultural methods.

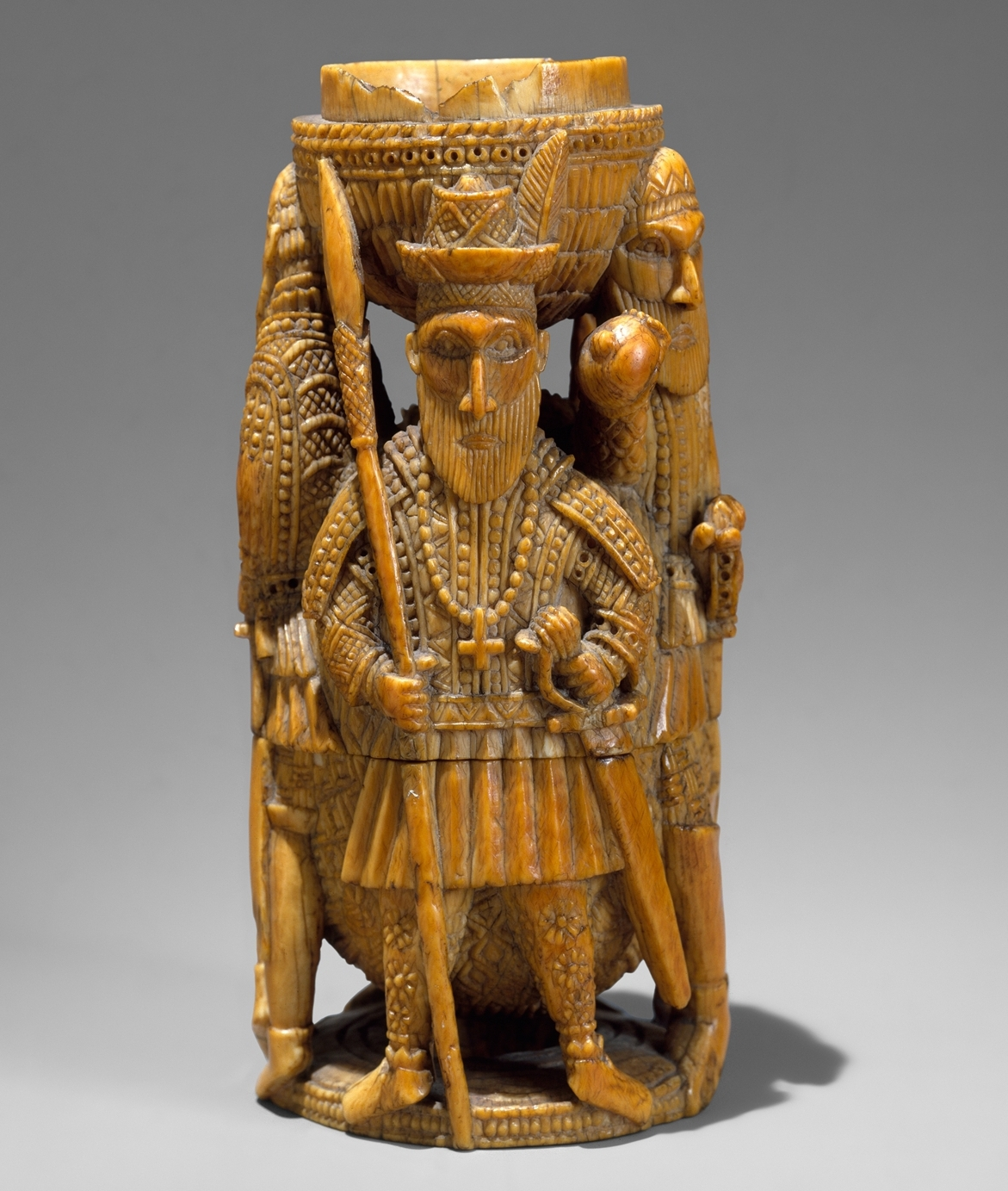
Saltcellar with Portuguese Figures

Ivory carving was a traditional part of West African art. In what is now Sierra Leone, the Sapi people were noted for producing ivory pieces for export. When Portuguese traders began to establish themselves in enclaves on the ivory and grain coasts in the late 15th century, they began to commission local artisans to produce intricately designed ivory vessels, receptacles, and boxes for export to Europe. Given the valuable nature of ivory, these containers were typically only used to hold valuable goods, such as salt, pepper, and other spices, all of which the nascent Portuguese Empire was quickly gaining access to through its widening trade network. The result of these trade relations was a mixing of Portuguese and Sapi artistic tradition, creating an Afro-Portuguese style of art. This hybridization resulted in works of art that contained symbols, motifs, and imagery derived from both the Sapi and the Portuguese.

In addition, another important Portuguese contribution to the country's history was the introduction of Christianity. The Portuguese missionary Baltasar Barreira ministered in Sierra Leone until 1610. Jesuits, and later in the century, Capuchins, continued the mission. By 1700 it had closed, although priests occasionally visited.

=== Togo ===
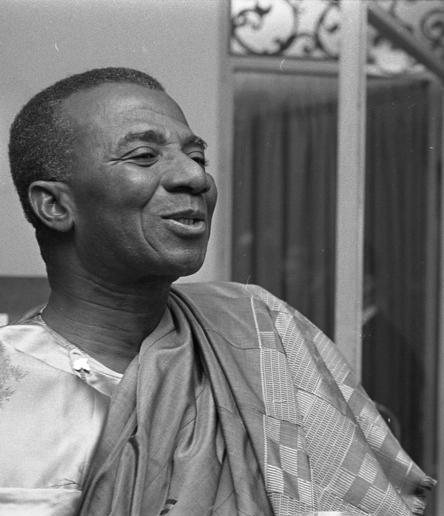
Sylvanus Olympio

The Portuguese community in Togo is also not very expressive, standing at around 20 people. Nonetheless, the relations between the two countries are expanding, especially in business; for instance, in 2016 there was a diplomatic visit in Lisbon by Togolese foreign minister Robert Debussy, in 2017 the direct flight Lisbon-Lomé was established and in 2018 Lomé hosted the "Open Day Portugal" event. To boost economic relations there is also a direct flight connecting Lisbon and Lomé. The Portuguese are also active in combatting piracy alongside Togolese forces; for instance, in 2017 three boats were given to Togo by the Portuguese Navy. The Portuguese support to "Support to West Africa Integrated Maritime Security" programme was reasserted in 2023.

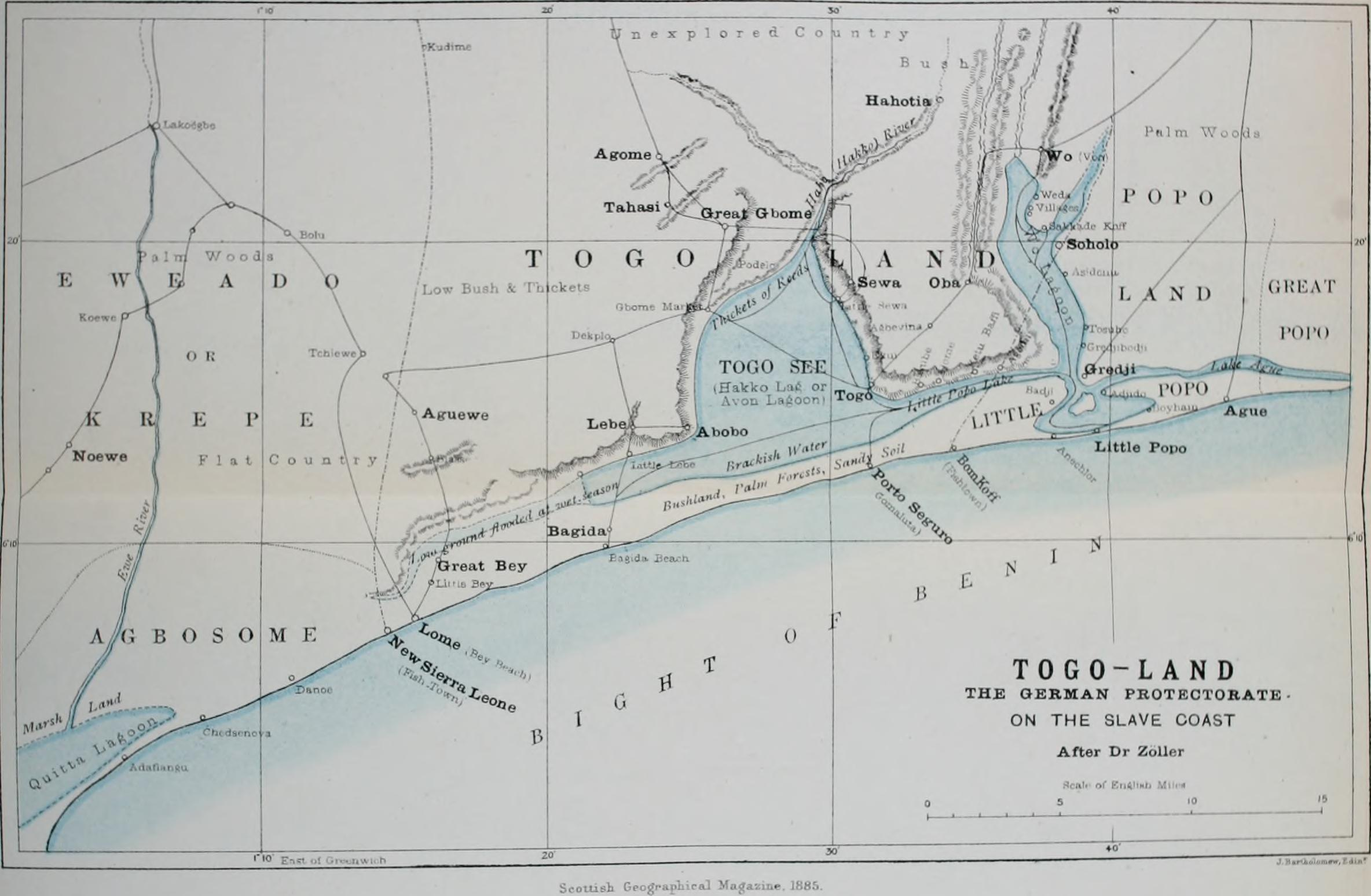
An 1885 map showing Petit-Popo and Porto Seguro along the Togolese coast

Despite there not being a Portuguese diplomatic mission in Togo, the relations between the two countries date back to the 15th century. Portuguese sailors were the first Europeans to reach the Bay of Benin around 1472. In particular, the first Europeans to see Togo were João de Santarém and Pêro Escobar, the Portuguese explorers who sailed along its coast between 1471 and 1473. They were impressed by the art treasures they saw there, particularly the works made of bronze, ivory, wood and terracotta. Political, diplomatic and trade relations then developed. The most important trade goods were slaves, which coastal African chiefs captured in their wars and sold to the Portuguese, who then brought them to their forts and from there exchanged them, primarily for gold. Aného - historically known as Petit Popo - it had a Portuguese slave market and it was a Portuguese base in what is now Togo. These contacts developed into a triangular trade between Portugal, Africa and Brazil in the 16th century, which, with increasing competition from the Dutch, French and English, turned into a direct trade between the coast of Brazil and the Bay of Benin. Especially with the flight of the Portuguese royal family to Brazil and the establishment of the capital of the Portuguese Empire in Rio de Janeiro at the beginning of the 19th century, the direct relationship between Brazil and Africa increased. The French ethnologist Pierre Fatumbi Verger in particular examined this relationship and in particular the movement of people between the Slave Coast and Brazil, both in trade from the Slave Coast towards Brazil and in the return of many former slaves there with the abolition of slavery in the middle of the 19th century 19th century. A number of existing family names in the region date from this time, including: da Silva, da Costa, da Rocha, de Souza, d'Almeida, dos Santos, Marinho, Martins and Olympio.

In fact, it is still possible to find some traces the Portuguese left behind them, notably Catholicism (the religion of 25% of the country's population), some vocabulary (e.g. abounêké from "boneca" or "doll" or kopò from "copo" or "glass" or also dò from "dor" or "pain") and toponyms (e.g. Porto Seguro). Sylvanus Olympio, the first President of Togo was of Afro-Luso-Brazilian descent and member of the important Olympio family, which included his uncle Octaviano Olympio, one of the richest people in Togo in the early 1900s. It is also worth noting that a Portuguese national was appointed as the EU head of mission in Togo and in May 2021 it was announced that the Portuguese Paulo Duarte would be Togo's new national coach.

== Central Africa ==
Excluding Angola, Equatorial Guinea and São Tomé and Príncipe (Portuguese-speaking African countries), there aren't large Portuguese communities in Central African countries.

A major community is found in the Democratic Republic of the Congo, where around 6,100 Portuguese are thought to live.

== Eastern Africa ==
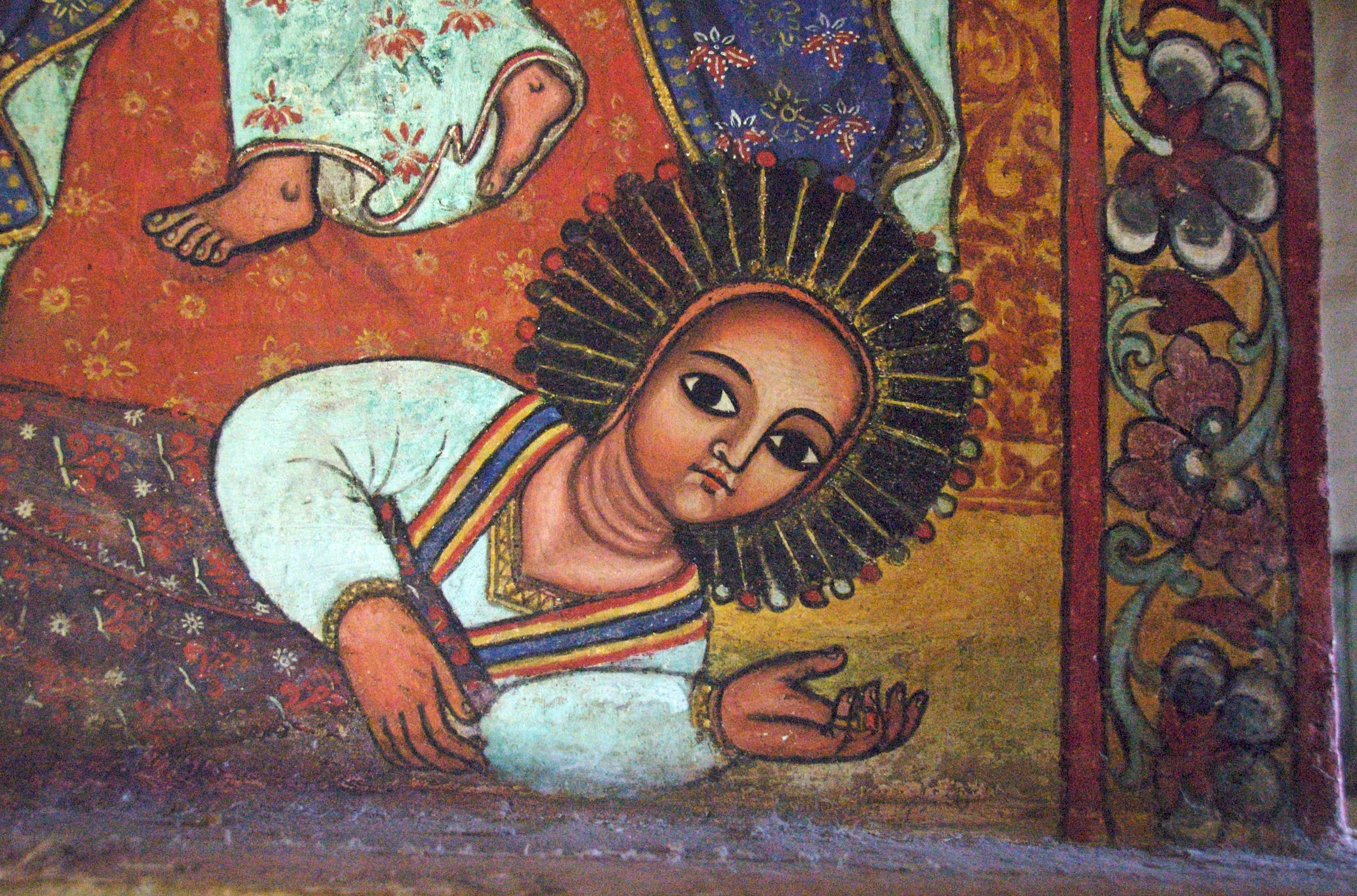
Itege Mentewab lying prostrate at Mary's feet at Nerga Selassie in Lake Tana, 1748

Excluding Mozambique (Portuguese-speaking African country) there aren't large Portuguese communities in Eastern African countries.

There is a Portuguese African community found in Njanja Area of Zimbabwe. They are known as Njanja People.

Though a small cohort, Portuguese are also present in Ethiopia. For instance, Empress Mentewab is arguably one of the most prominent Portuguese-Ethiopians.

In Rwanda, Burundi and Uganda on the other hand, the Portuguese presence has been historically insignificant. Despite this, there was a thrilling Portuguese community in Rwanda up the early 1990s but with the genocide the overwhelming majority left, especially for France. In recent years, the relations with Rwanda have improved and Portugal was the biggest foreign investor in the country in 2017. With Burundi, relations are limited and mainly deal with volunteering. Relations with Uganda are also very limited and the majority of Portuguese living in the country are associated with the Catholic church and international cooperation. The biggest recent event in Luso-Ugandan relations include a 261 million $ project in Uganda promoted by Mota-Engil.

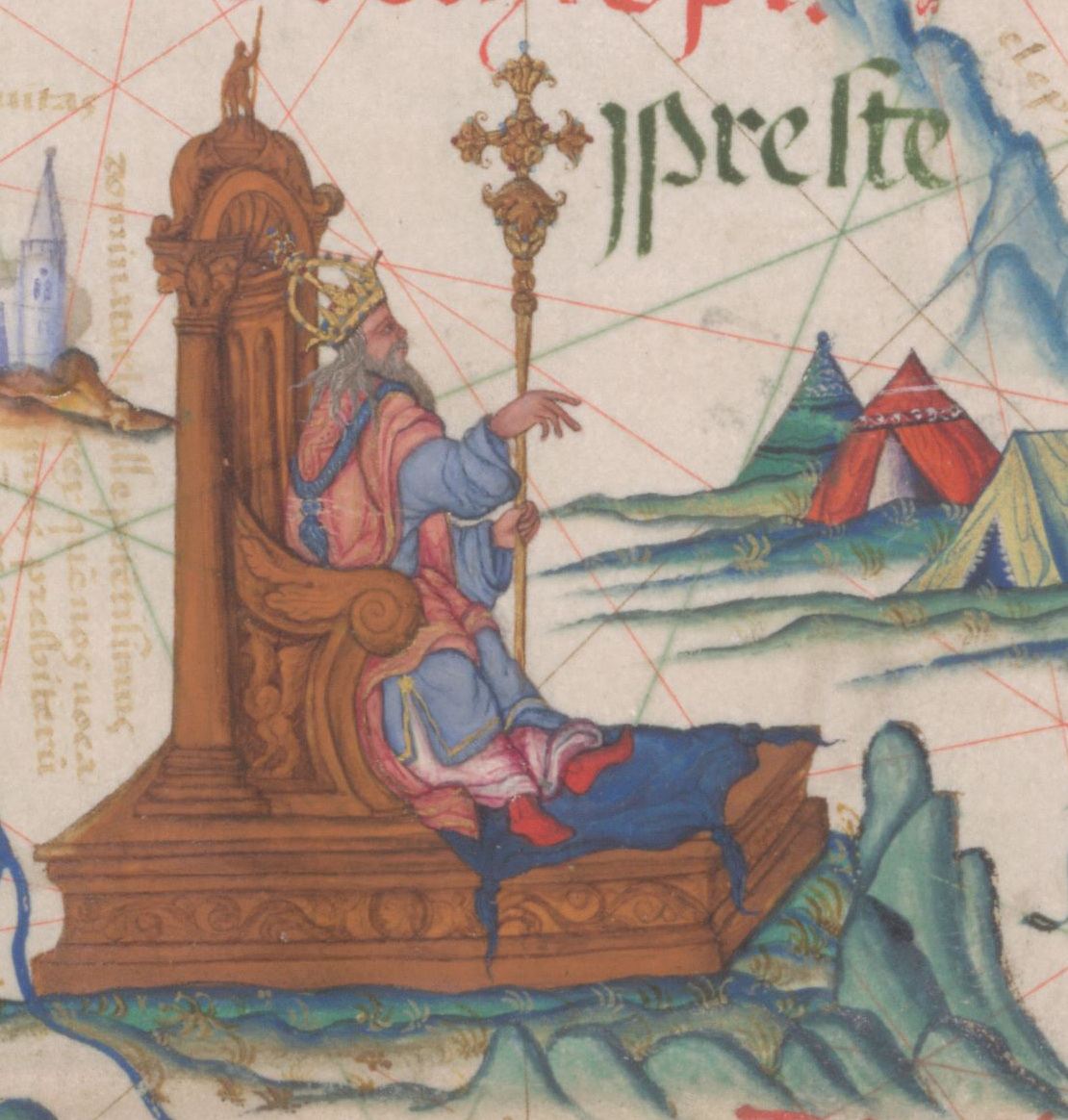
"Preste" as the Emperor of Ethiopia, enthroned on a map of East Africa. From an atlas by the Portuguese cartographer Diogo Homem for Queen Mary, c. 1555–1559. (British Library)

Relations with Eastern African countries such as Eritrea and Djibouti also are very limited. Nonetheless, it is interesting to notice that the first Westerner to document a visit to Eritrea was the Portuguese explorer Francisco Alvares in 1520. His books have the first description of the local powers of Tigray, the kingdom of Axum and Barnagais (the lord of the lands by the sea). The contemporary coast of Eritrea was the one that guaranteed the connection to the region of Tigray where the Portuguese had a small colony, and therefore the connection to the interior Ethiopian, allies of the Portuguese. Massawa was also the stage for the 1541 landing of troops by Cristóvão da Gama in the military campaign that would eventually defeat the Adal Sultanate in the final battle of Wayna Daga in 1543. The Portuguese came to the coast of the Horn of Africa in the 16th century in search for Prester John (Preste João), who was thought as a key ally for attacking Mecca and thus for ensuring the control the Red Sea. Using its navy, Portugal targeted the Ottoman Empire, establishing trade and supply bases. The Portuguese, including missionaries, also aimed to strengthen religious influence. The Portuguese occupied Massawa and Arquico. Not much remains but Massawa's port was designed for the first time by Portuguese D. João de Castro in 1541. Massawa was also the point in which Cristóvão da Gama's troops disembarked when they came to Africa to confront Adal in the Wayna Daga battle. In fact, the Eritrean coast secured a link to the Portuguese ally, Ethiopia. Nowadays relations between the two countries are almost non-existent. Interestingly, relations seem to be stronger with Eritrea's neighbour Djibouti, now harbouring an important international port.

== Southern Africa ==
The largest Portuguese community found in Southern Africa is by far the one established in South Africa.

In the past many Portuguese also moved to Namibia, which still houses around 4,800 Portuguese nationals. The first Portuguese settlers arrived in Namibia from Angola after the latter won independence in 1975. Although not a country of immigration anymore, interest of Portuguese nationals towards Namibia remains strong, especially when it comes to tourism. In February 2024, a group of 22 Portuguese tourists suffered from an accident in Namibia and 2 nationals died, while the others were repatriated to Portugal.

== North Africa ==
Among North African countries, Morocco has a small but significant Portuguese diaspora.

Algeria hosts around 1,621 Portuguese people. The Portuguese community in Algeria is a recent diaspora, mainly consisting of people working for one of the more than 80 Portuguese enterprises active in the Northern African country.

There was also a small Portuguese community in Sudan up until the 2023 coup. It is thought that at least 21 Portuguese fled the country due to the increased political instability. There is now record of only one Portuguese citizen remaining in the Northern African country as of 2023.

== Population by country ==
As shown below, there are 64,000 estimated Portuguese Africans in African countries (except for South Africa) not being PALOP members.

| Country | Population | Year |
|---|---|---|
| Portugal | 1,390,000 | 2010 |
| South Africa | 750,000 | 2021 |
| Angola | 380,767 | 2010 |
| Mozambique | 250,413 | 2010 |
| Malawi | 19,000 | 2020 |
| Cape Verde | 18,561 | 2020 |
| Zimbabwe | 17,000 | 2020 |
| Guinea-Bissau | 10,314 | 2020 |
| Democratic Republic of the Congo | 6,100 | 2020 |
| Zambia | 5,600 | 2020 |
| Namibia | 4,783 | 2018 |
| São Tomé and Príncipe | 4,705 | 2020 |
| Senegal | 2,900 | 2020 |
| Morocco | 2,445 | 2020 |
| Algeria | 1,621 | 2022 |
| Congo | 1,485 | 2019 |
| Tanzania | 1,400 | 2020 |
| Eswatini | 1,026 | 2014 |
| Kenya | 782 | 2014 |
| Botswana | 466 | 2019 |
| Egypt | 229 | 2020 |
| Tunisia | 243 | 2020 |
| Ivory Coast | 200 | 2019 |
| Nigeria | 170 | 2017 |
| Equatorial Guinea | 134 | 2014 |
| Mali | 76 | 2020 |
| Guinea | 60 | 2020 |

== Notable people ==
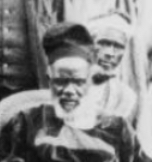
William Fernandez

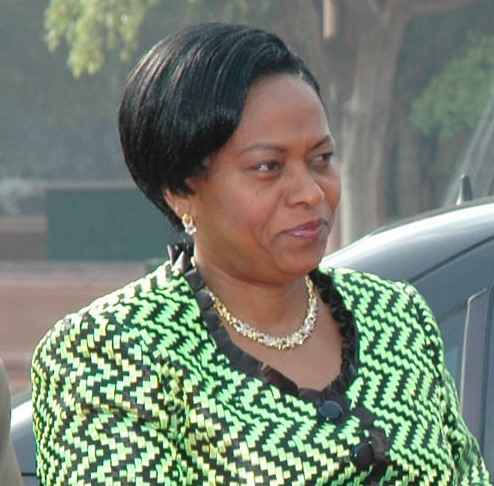
Chantal de Souza Yayi

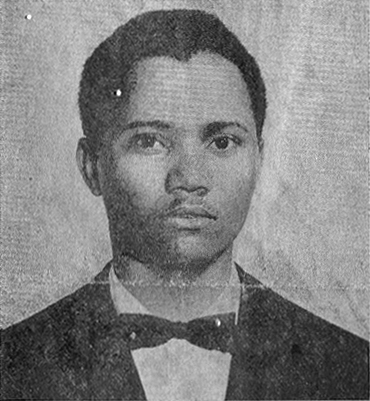
Mario-Philippe Cardoso

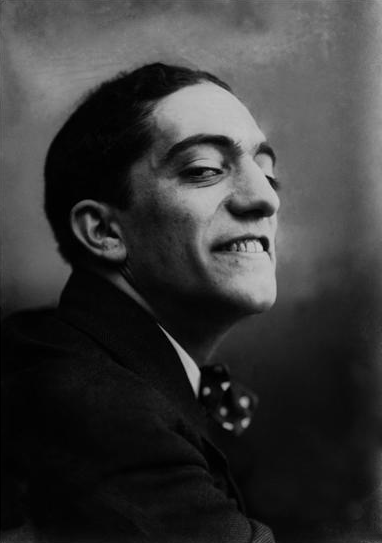
Almada Negreiros

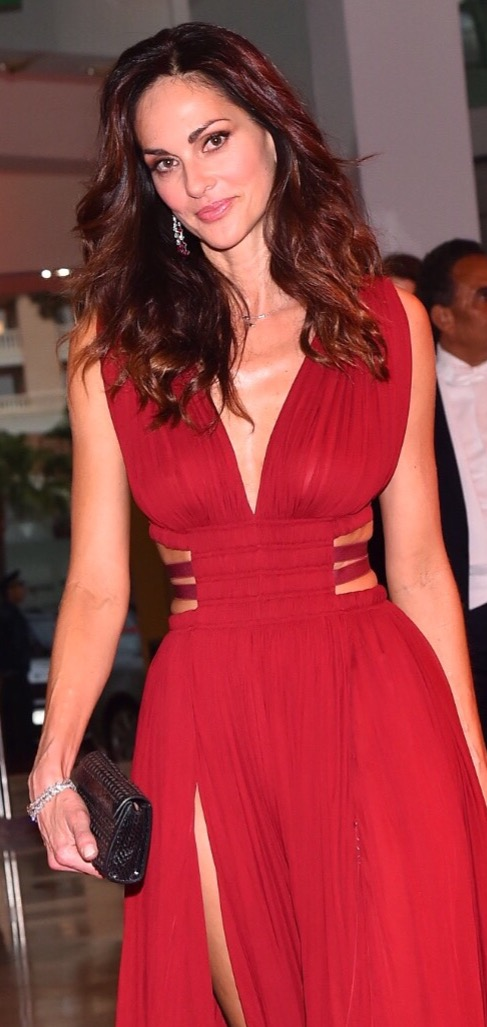
Tasha de Vasconcelos

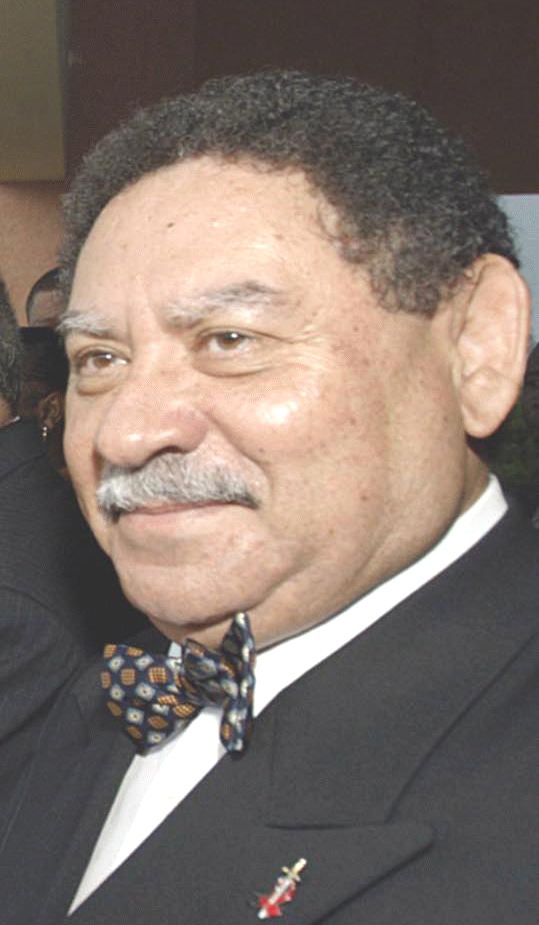
Fradique de Menezes

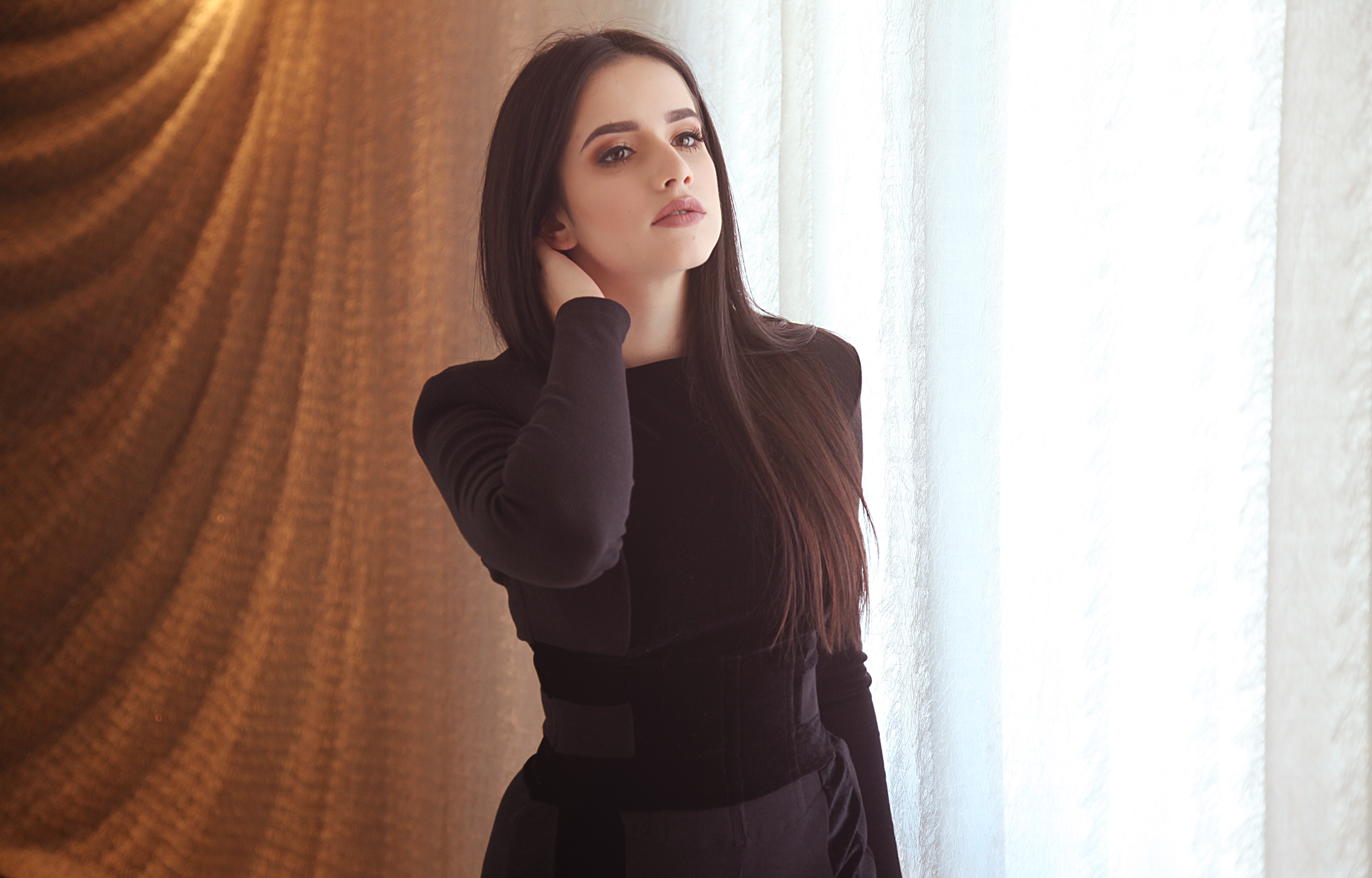
Filipa Carmo da Silva

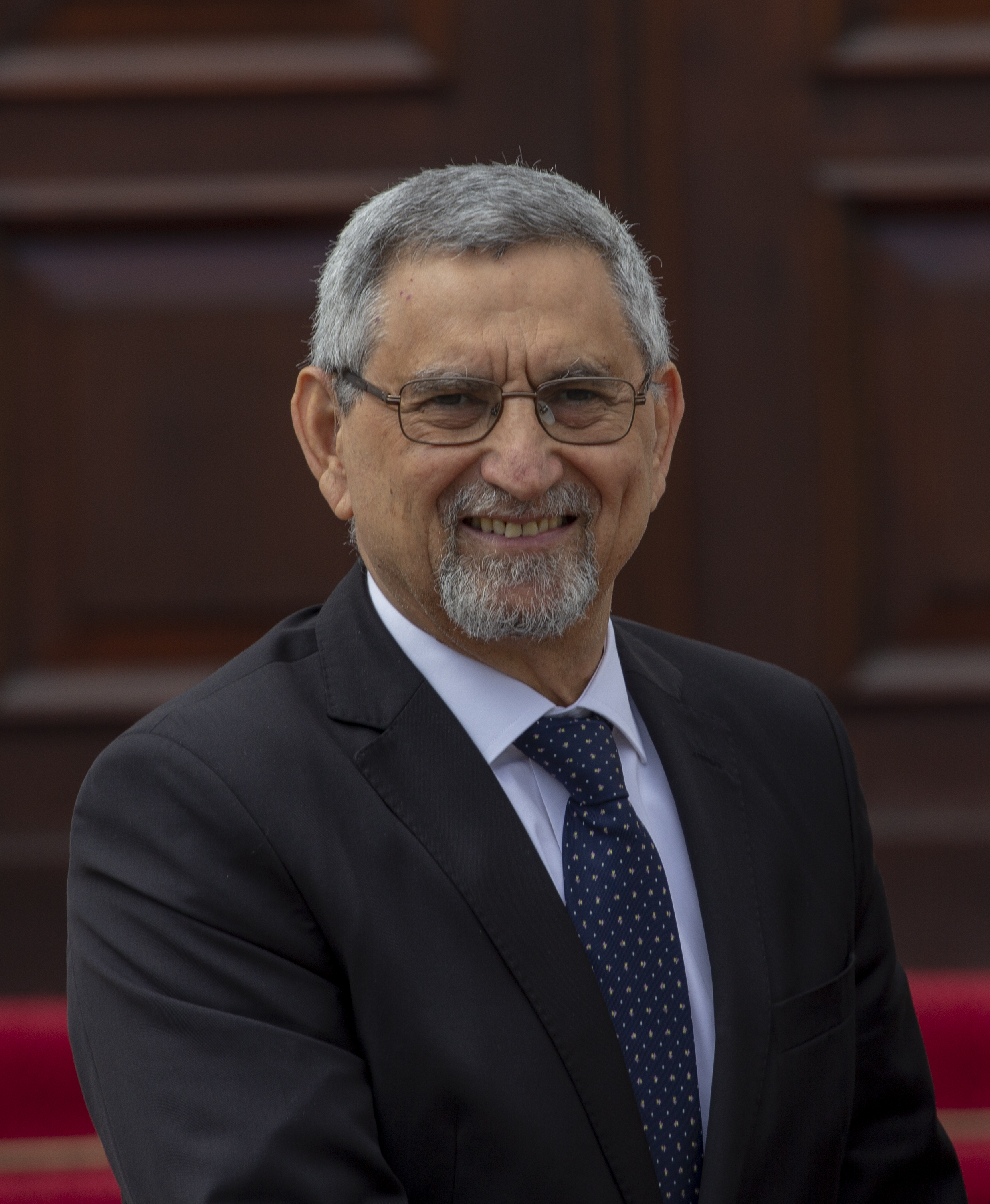
Jorge Carlos Fonseca

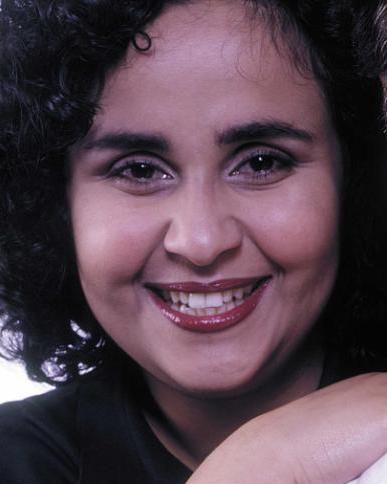
Marta Dias

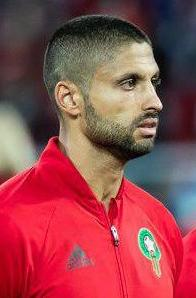
Manuel da Costa

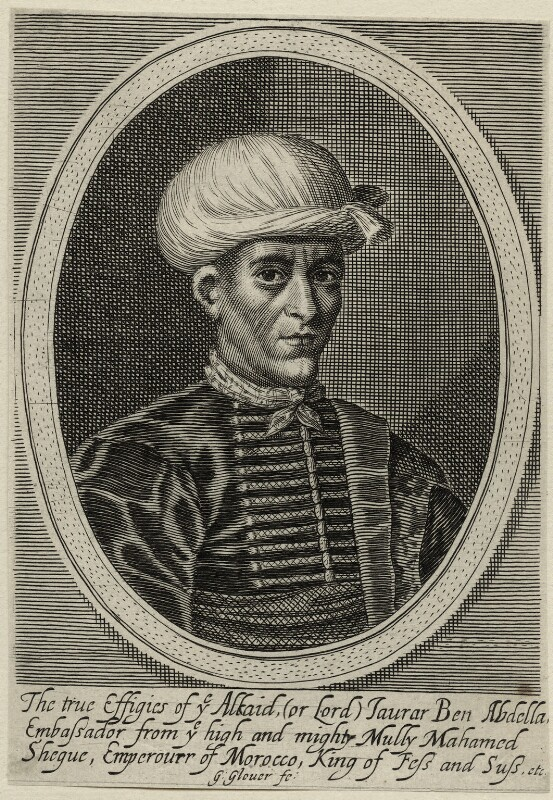
Jawdar ben Abdellah

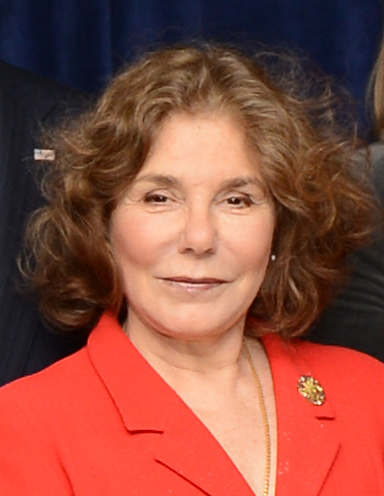
Teresa Heinz

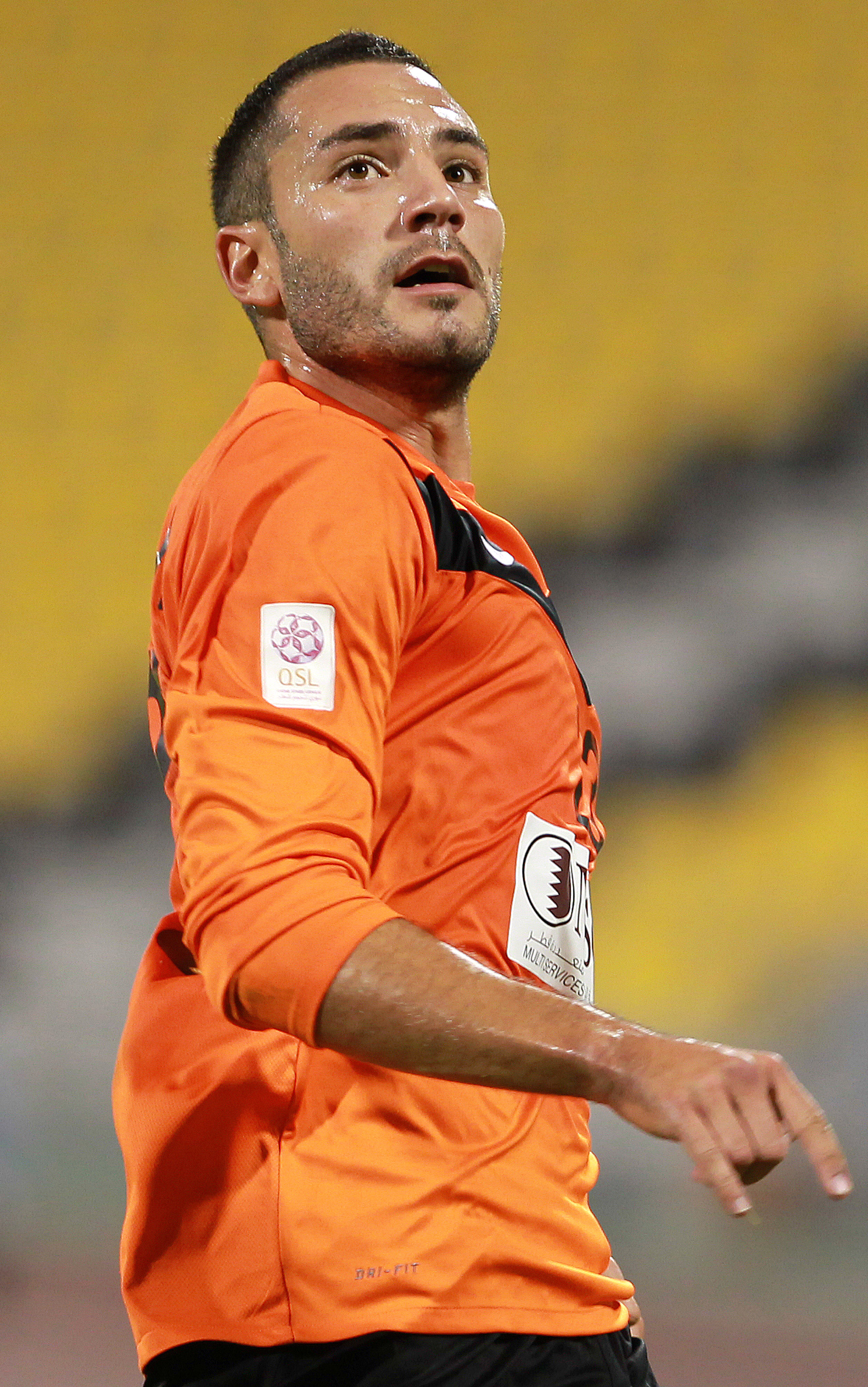
Mourad Meghni

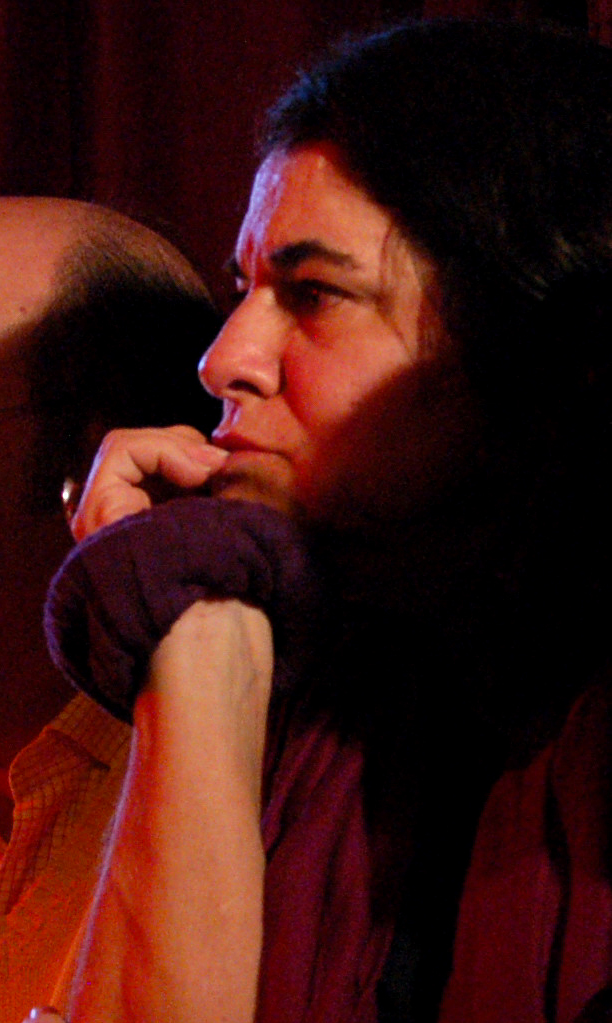
Amélia Muge

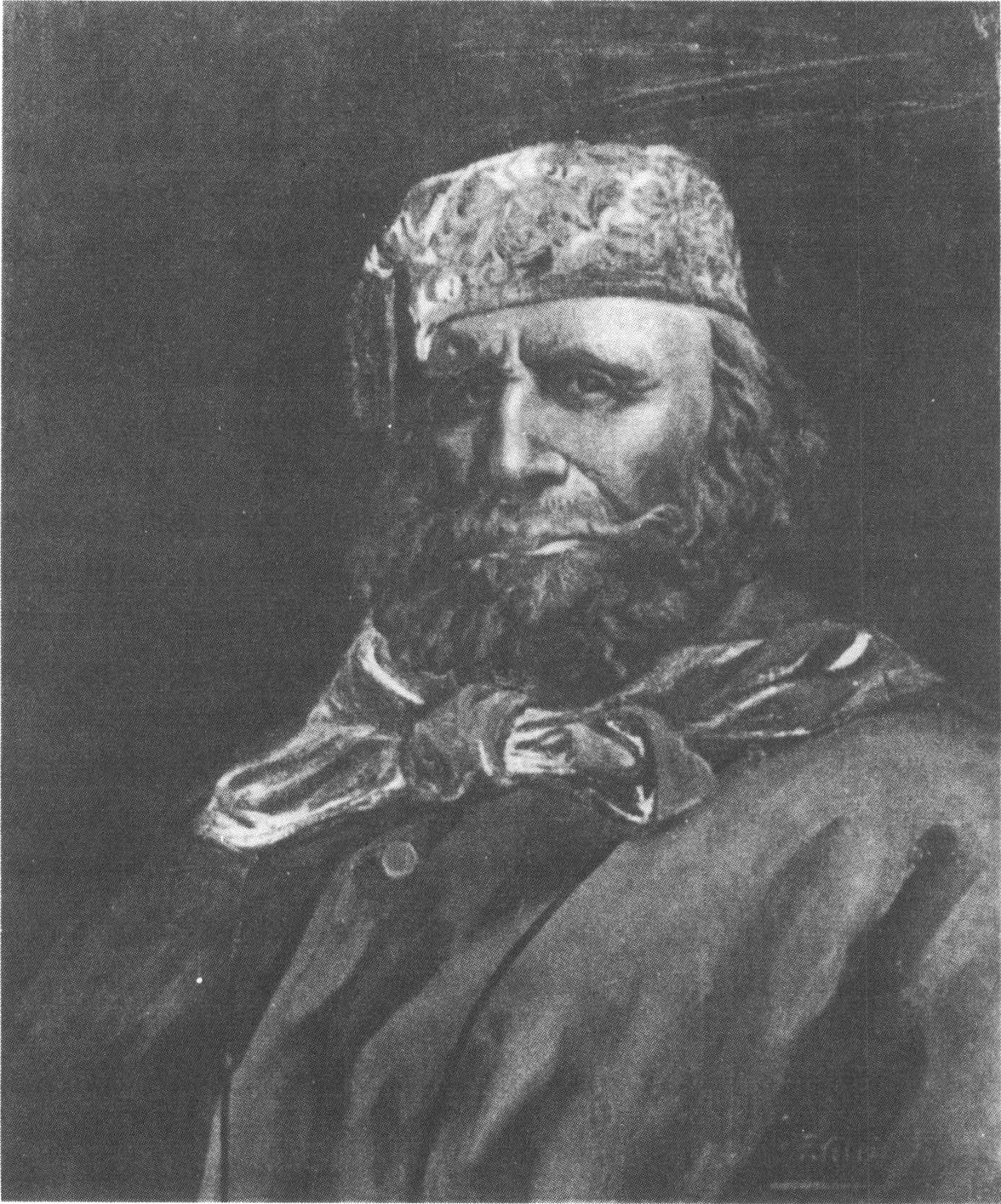
Francisco Félix de Sousa

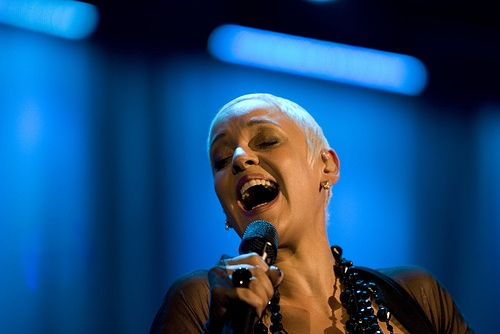
Mariza

== See also ==
- Portuguese people
- Groups of Portuguese Africans:
  - Portuguese Angolans
  - Portuguese Guineans
  - Portuguese Mozambicans
  - Portuguese-South Africans
