= Luaty Beirão =

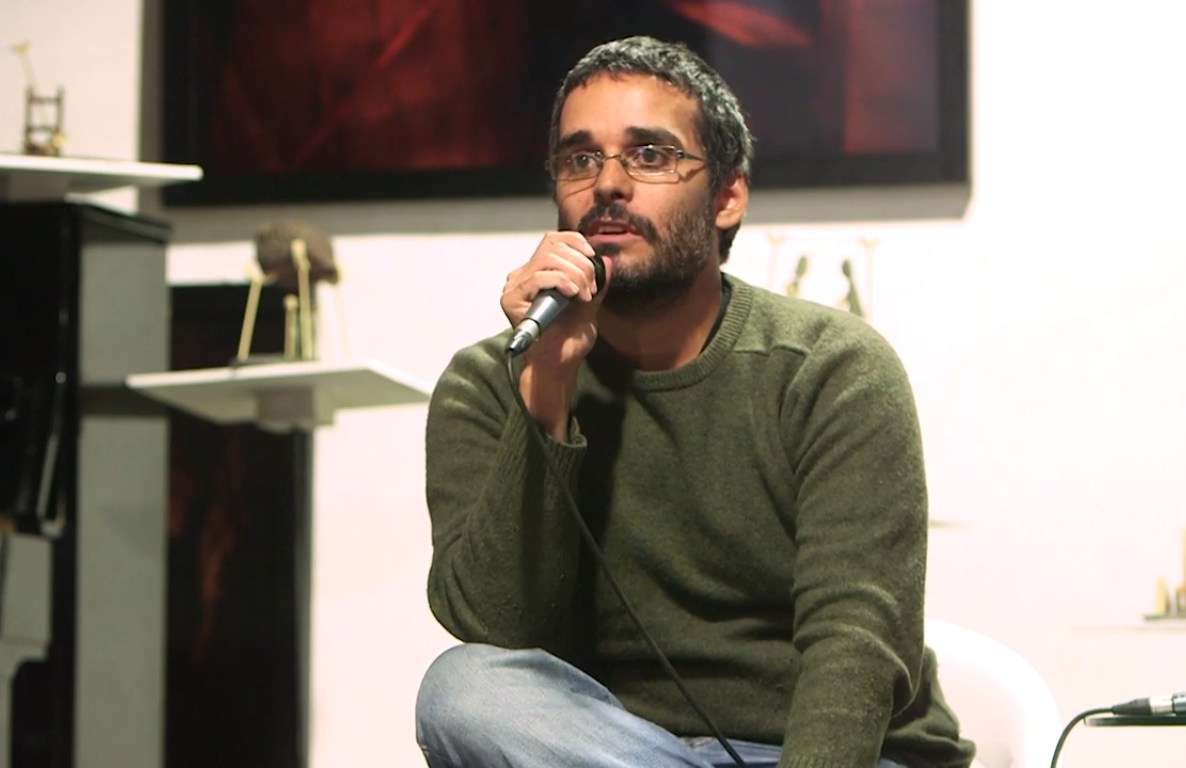
- Beirão in 2016

Background information
- Also known as: Ikonoklasta; Brigadeiro Mata Frakuzk
- Born: 19 November 1981 (age 44); Luanda, Angola
- Genres: Hip hop
- Occupations: musician, activist
- Years active: 1994–present

Luaty Beirão (born 1981), also known by his stage name Ikonoklasta, is an Angolan rapper known for his anti-corruption activism.

== Life ==
Beirão was born to a Portuguese Angolan family in Luanda and his father, João Beirão, was a well-known member of the MPLA. After developing his initial interest in hip hop during his adolescence, Beirão first entered the music scene in 2004, as part of the group Conjunto Ngonguenha.

Beirão rose to prominence as an activist after an incident in February 2011, where - upon noticing the son of President José Eduardo dos Santos at a concert - he jumped onstage and publicly called on dos Santos to step down. In March 2016, he was sentenced to five and a half years in prison for allegedly planning a revolution against dos Santos. Beirão and several other prisoners launched a hunger strike in protest of their incarceration; after 36 days of this strike, the government agreed to reduce their sentences to house arrest. He was released later that year after successfully appealing his sentence.

== Discography ==
=== Solo albums ===
- Ikonodamus (2008)

=== with Conjunto Ngonguenha ===
- Ngonguenhação (2004)
- Nós os do Conjunto (2010)

=== with Batida as Iqokwe ===
- The Beginning, The Medium, The End, and The Infinite (2021)
