= Portuguese Mozambicans =

Mozambicans of Portuguese birth or descent

Portuguese Mozambican Luso-moçambicano
Total population
- 82,593 (0.36% of the population) (Mozambique) 57,593 Mozambican citizens (2012) (Portugal) 25,000 Portuguese immigrants (2011)

Regions with significant populations
- Maputo, Matola, Beira, Pemba

Languages
- Portuguese, Xitsonga, Makhuwa, Ndau dialect of Shona, Swahili, and other Bantu languages

Religion
- Christianity (predominantly Roman Catholic with some Protestants)

Related ethnic groups
- Portuguese people, Portuguese Brazilian, white Brazilians, Portuguese Africans

Portuguese Mozambicans (Portuguese: luso-moçambicanos) are Mozambican-born descendants of Portuguese settlers.

== History ==
Portuguese explorers turned to present-day Mozambique and two other PALOP nations (Angola and Guinea-Bissau) to bring black slaves to Portugal before bringing them to work for their plantations in their Latin American province, the present-named Brazil. The first permanent Portuguese communities in the region were established in the 16th century. The whole region was divided into prazos (agricultural estates), to be lived by Portuguese settler families in the 17th century. Mozambique was declared a Portuguese province by the 19th century. By the early 20th century, the mainland government permitted more white emigration and settlement to the region, and Mozambique had 370,000 Portuguese settlers, who improved its economy, by the 1960s. It was during this time that António de Oliveira Salazar led Portugal, in which several thousands of Portuguese citizens fled to other countries, especially neighbouring Rhodesia and South Africa as well as Brazil and the United States. Blacks and some mestiços and whites revolted against Portuguese rule in 1974.

The Carnation Revolution in Portugal led to the independence of its overseas colonies in 1975. By July 1975, around 80,000 Portuguese Mozambicans were left in the country from around 250,000 that lived in the country in the early 1970s. The new state gave the remaining 80,000 Portuguese 3 months or 90 days to stay and accept Mozambican citizenship or get out. Of the 80,000, only around 10,000 opted for Mozambican citizenship instead of Portuguese citizenship. The most decisive factors for the preference for white emigration according to US diplomat William Jacobsen was a "combination of doctors leaving for good, plummeting standards of medical care... and uncertainty about country's willingness to allow Mozambican citizens to leave national territory."

Large numbers of Portuguese residents fled shortly after, most of them to Portugal, where they were called retornados, while others moved to neighbouring Malawi, Rhodesia, or South Africa, and/or Brazil and the United States. The most notable legacy of Portuguese Mozambican settlers in South Africa is Nando's, created in 1987, which incorporated influences from former Portuguese settlers from Mozambique, many of whom had settled on the south-eastern side of Johannesburg, after Mozambique's independence in 1975.

When the Community of Portuguese Language Countries (CPLP) was founded in 1996, many Portuguese and Portuguese Brazilians arrived for economic and educational aid to Mozambique. They have helped increase Portuguese-language fluency especially in remote rural places and improved the economy, as the metical has a large value converted from the Euro. Many among them have adopted the country as their permanent home. Many more Portuguese settlers returned from Portugal, it is estimated by the Mozambican embassy that about 6,000 returned.

== Language ==
Portuguese is the official language and lingua franca of Mozambique. Their dialect, called Mozambican Portuguese, is closer to Standard European Portuguese than Brazilian dialects. Some speak Bantu languages (like Xitsonga, Makhuwa, and Ndau dialect of Shona) as second languages. Many educated Portuguese Mozambicans speak English, as it is an international lingua franca and Mozambique is a member of the Commonwealth of Nations.

== Religion ==
Most Portuguese Mozambicans are Christians belonging to the Roman Catholic Church.

== Notable Portuguese Mozambicans ==
- Mia Couto, well-known Mozambican writer
- Tasha de Vasconcelos, Mozambican-Portuguese-Canadian model
- Ximene Gomes, Mozambican swimmer
- Pepo Santos, Mozambican footballer
- Guima, Mozambican footballer
- Jessica Teixeira Vieira, Mozambican swimmer
- Teresa Heinz, Portuguese-American businesswoman and philanthropist
- João Paulo Borges Coelho, Mozambican historian and novelist
- Carlos Cardoso, murdered Mozambican journalist
- Carlos Queiroz, football manager
- Otelo Saraiva de Carvalho, Mozambican-Portuguese leader of the Carnation Revolution
- Paulo Fonseca, football coach, born in Nampula
- Rui Baltazar, lawyer and politician who served as Minister of Justice for and helped draft the constitution of the People's Republic of Mozambique
- Pedro Perino, Portuguese-Mozambican racing driver from Maputo
- Rui Águas, Portuguese Mozambican racing driver from Nampula
- Amélia Muge, singer
- Diogo Calila, Mozambican footballer

== See also ==
- Mozambique–Portugal relations
- Portuguese Africans
  - Portuguese Angolans
  - Portuguese-South Africans
- Portuguese Americans
- Portuguese Brazilian
