= Portuguese Angolans =

Angolans of Portuguese birth or descent

Portuguese Angolan Luso-Angolano
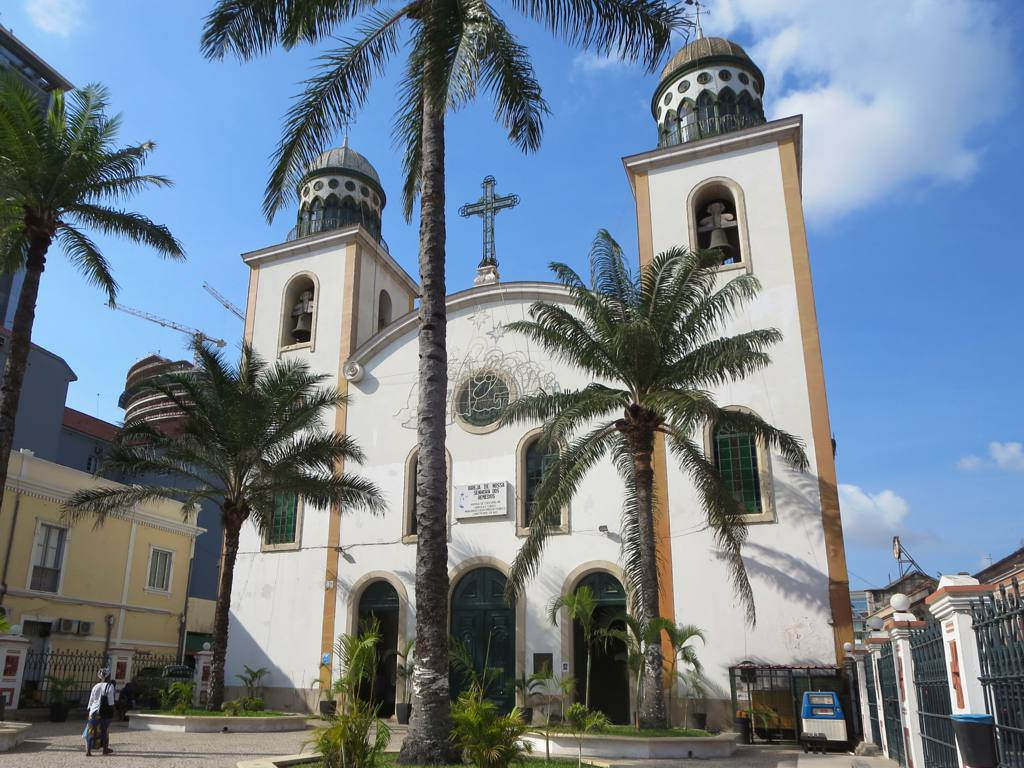
- The Cathedral of the Holy Saviour in Luanda, built by Portuguese colonists in 1628

Total population
- ~200,000 (2014)

Regions with significant populations
- Luanda, Benguela

Languages
- Portuguese, a small minority having some mastery of Kimbundu, Umbundu, Kikongo, and other Bantu languages

Religion
- Christianity (predominantly Catholic)

Related ethnic groups
- Portuguese people, Portuguese Brazilian, Brazilians, Portuguese Africans

Portuguese Angolans (Portuguese: luso-angolano) are citizens of Angola who are either descended from Portuguese people or Portuguese emigrants permanently living in Angola. The number of Portuguese Angolans precipitously dropped during and immediately after the Angolan War of Independence, but several hundreds of thousands have either returned or emigrated to live in Angola.

== History ==
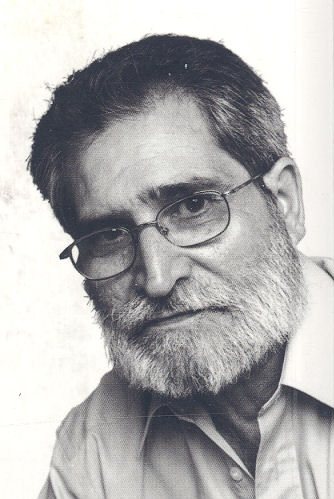
Portuguese Angolan writer Pepetela

Historical population
Year	Pop.	±% p.a.
1845	1,832	—
1900	9,198	+2.98%
1920	20,200	+4.01%
1940	44,083	+3.98%
1950	78,826	+5.98%
1960	172,529	+8.15%
1961	162,387	−5.88%
1970	290,000	+6.66%
1974	335,000	+3.67%
1976	40,000	−65.45%
2014	200,000	+4.33%

In 1482, Portuguese caravels commanded by Diogo Cão arrived in the Kingdom of Kongo. Other expeditions followed, and close relations were soon established between the two states. The Portuguese brought firearms and many other technological advances, as well as a new religion (Christianity); in return, the King of the Congo offered plenty of slaves, ivory, and minerals.

In 1881, of the 1,450 European residents of Luanda, 721 were exiled criminals, degredados. Before the 1920s, despite government incentives, very few Portuguese went to Angola willingly.

In 1960, Angola had up to 172,000 Portuguese settlers, who significantly contributed to its economy. The majority of whom came from rural agrarian backgrounds in Portugal, who saw engaging in commerce in Angola as one of the few means of upward social mobility available to them.

As the Angolan war of independence began in 1961, triggering off a late colonial development of Angola, there was an influx of Portuguese military personnel, as well as civil servants and other people. As a consequence, the number of Portuguese living in Angola went up to about 350,000. This number would have been higher, had a significant part of the settlers not left for other countries, especially Namibia, Brazil, South Africa and the United States. While most Portuguese then living in Angola sided with Portugal's efforts to suppress the anti-colonial revolt, a minority sympathized with the nationalist movements, and a few even joined them in their fight. The Angolan author Pepetela is among these. When the Salazar regime in Portugal was abolished by a military coup in Portugal, in 1974, and independence was granted to the colonies by the new government, whites overwhelmingly left Angola after independence in 1975. Most of them went to Portugal, where they were called retornados and were not always welcomed, while others moved to neighboring Namibia (then a South African territory), South Africa or Brazil, or United States. It is estimated that around 250,000 left the country in 1975 and by 1976 only 30,000 to 40,000 remained in Angola.

Among the departed Portuguese civilians, many were able to take with them only a single suitcase, while some were able to dispatch their household goods and even cars by ship. The majority left everything behind. They boarded planes at Luanda's Craveiro Lopes Airport at the rate of 500 a day, but there were not enough flights to cover demand. Back in Angola, the new government gave all remaining Portuguese settlers a few months period to choose between Angolan citizenship or to leave the country. A significant minority of them opted for Angola and some of them actively took part in the Angolan Civil War, generally on the side of the MPLA.

After Angola abandoned in 1991 the socialist regime adopted at independence in 1975, many Portuguese Angolans returned to Angola. Due to Angola's economic boom, which started in the 1990s, an increasing number of Portuguese without previous attachment to Angola have migrated to Angola for economic reasons, most importantly the recent national economic boom. As of 2008, Angola was the preferred destination for Portuguese migrants in Africa. Portuguese nationals numbered an estimated 120,000 in 2011, reaching about 200,000 in 2013.

== Notable people ==
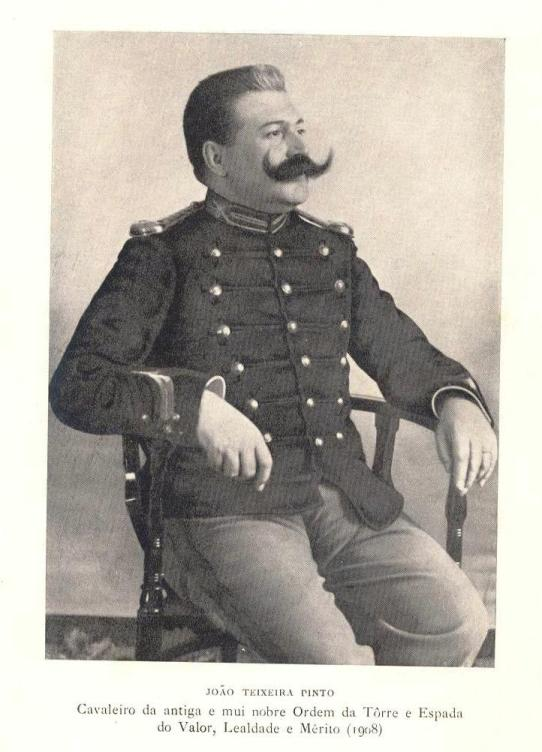
João Teixeira Pinto

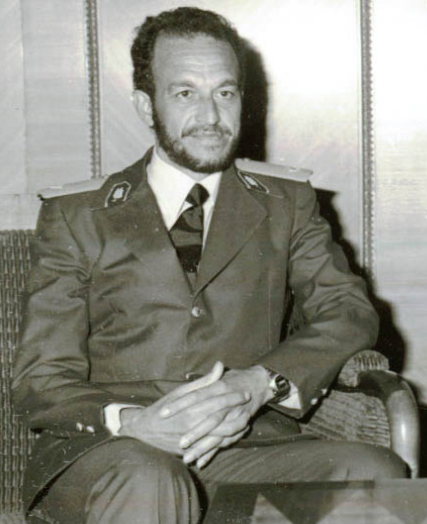
Iko Carreira

Notable Angolan people of Portuguese descent include:

- António Jacinto, poet and politician, Minister of Culture
- Pepetela, writer, politician
- Lúcio Lara, General Secretary of the MPLA
- José Maria Pimentel, writer and illustrator
- Hélder Costa
- Paulo Figueiredo, footballer
- Rony Lopes
- Rúben Gouveia, footballer
- José Águas, footballer
- José Luís Vidigal, footballer
- Rafael Leão, footballer
- Jéssica Silva, footballer
- Wilson Constantino Novo Estrela, footballer
- Pedro Lima, actor and olympic swimmer
- Ricardo Teixeira, racing driver
- José Eduardo Agualusa, journalist and writer
- Luandino Vieira, writer
- João Teixeira Pinto, Portuguese military officer
- Ana Paula Ribeiro Tavares writer, historian
- Tomaz Morais, rugby union coach
- Xesko, artist, writer, swimmer
- Ernesto Lara Filho, revolutionary writer and agronomist
- Iko Carreira, Defense Minister of Angola
- Alda Lara, poet
- Luaty Beirão, rapper and activist
- Victorino Cunha, basketball coach
- Amélia Veiga, poet and teacher
- Ruy Duarte de Carvalho, author and filmmaker
- Luís Magalhães, basketball coach
- Mário Palma, basketball coach
- Armando Gama, singer-songwriter
- Ana Sofia Nóbrega, swimmer
- Nádia Cruz, swimmer
- Elsa Freire, swimmer
- João Paulo de Silva, sport shooter
- André Matias, rower
- Maria Araújo Kahn, U.S. federal judge

== Language and religion ==
Their native language is Portuguese, which today is the official language and lingua franca of Angola. Their communities existing in Luanda, Benguela and Moçâmedes spoke until the early 20th-century Portuguese mixed with numerous elements from African languages, especially Kimbundu and Umbundu. In the course of the 20th century, due to the waves of new settlers arriving from Portugal, their language became practically identical with European Portuguese. Some Portuguese Angolans have a lesser or greater mastery of one of the Bantu languages – notably Kimbundu, Umbundu, and Kikongo – but their number has diminished dramatically after independence, and hardly anybody now uses an African language as second languages. The vast majority of Portuguese Angolans are Christians, mostly Catholics, although many of them do not practice their religion. A very small number of them are Jews, whose ancestors escaped the Inquisition.

== See also ==
- White Angolans
- Lusotropicalismo
- Luso-Africans
  - Assimilados
  - Lançados
  - Angolan mestiços
  - Órfãs do Rei
- Angolar language
- Angolanidade
- Angolans in Portugal
  - Retornados
- Angola–Portugal relations
