= List of white Africans of European ancestry =

This is a list of notable White Africans of European ancestry, including both European immigrants who obtained citizenship in an African country and their descendants.

== List ==
=== Algeria ===
- Daniel Auteuil, actor
- Albert Camus, writer
- Pierre Chaulet, physician
- Étienne Daho, singer
- Mickaël Fabre, footballer
- Edwige Fenech, actress
- Nicole Garcia, actor
- Danièle Minne, activist
- Emmanuel Roblès, writer
- Yves Saint Laurent, fashion designer
- Jean Sénac, poet

=== Angola ===
- Iko Carreira, military officer and diplomat
- David Carmo, footballer
- Carlos Alberto Fernandes, footballer
- Hugo Ferreira, rock musician
- Paulo Figueiredo, footballer
- Pepetela, novelist
- João Ricardo, footballer
- Pedro Emanuel, footballer
- Madjer, beach soccer player
- Michelle Larcher de Brito, tennis player
- Ricardo Teixeira, racing driver
- Madilyn Bailey, singer
- Paulo Madeira, footballer
- José Águas, footballer
- Rúben Gouveia, footballer
- Luaty Beirão, rapper and activist
- André Matias, rower
- Pedro Pinotes, swimmer
- Luís Miguel, football coach and former footballer

=== Botswana ===
- Lynette Armstrong, accountant
- Roy Blackbeard, diplomat
- Ross Branch, motorcyclist
- Christian de Graaff, politician
- Russell England, farmer and politician
- James Freeman, swimmer
- Ruth Williams Khama, former first lady
- Derek Jones, politician
- Ian Kirby, attorney general
- John Mackenzie (1835–99), missionary to and advocate for the Tswana people, first governor of British Bechuanaland
- Jovan Nikolić, footballer
- Samantha Paxinos, swimmer
- Adrian Robinson, swimmer
- David van der Colff, swimmer
- Hendrik van Zyl (1828–80), notorious trader from Ghanzi who allegedly hid a vast treasure in the cave systems nearby
- Brandon Wilson, football player

=== Cape Verde ===
- Jorge Carlos Fonseca, President of Cape Verde
- Carlos Lisboa, basketball coach

=== Cameroon ===
- Claire Denis, writer
- Michel Gordillo, aviator

=== Equatorial Guinea ===
- Nené Ballina, former football player and coach
- Alvaro Cervera, former football player and coach

=== Eritrea ===
- Marina Colasanti, writer
- Erminia Dell'Oro, writer
- Remo Girone, actor
- Bruno Lauzi, singer
- Gianfranco Rosi, documentary filmmaker
- Lara Saint Paul, singer
- Italo Vassallo, footballer
- Luciano Vassallo, footballer
- Luciano Violante, politician and judge

=== Eswatini ===
- Richard E. Grant, actor
- Keith Fraser, skier
- Luke Hall, swimmer
- Nathan Kirsh, businessman
- Wickus Nienaber, swimmer
- Franc O'Shea, musician
- Robinson Stewart, athlete
- Robyn Young, swimmer

=== Ethiopia ===
- Francesco De Martini, military officer
- Gabriella Ghermandi, writer and singer

=== Gabon ===
- Lee White, conservationist, Minister of Water, Forests, the Sea, and Environment
- Marcel Lefebvre, bishop
- Sarah Myriam Mazouz, judoka
- Sylvia Bongo Ondimba, first lady

=== Ghana ===
- Joyce Bamford-Addo, speaker of the Parliament of Ghana
- William Boyd, writer
- John Collins, musician

=== Ivory Coast ===
- Constance Amiot, writer, composer
- Dominique Ouattara, first lady
- Katell Quillévéré, director

=== Kenya ===
- Michael Bear, Lord Mayor of London
- Arap Bethke, actor
- Michael Blundell, farmer, politician
- Roger Chapman, golfer
- Jamie Dalrymple, cricketer
- Richard Dawkins, evolutionist
- Ian Duncan, rally driver
- Jason Dunford, swimmer
- David Dunford, swimmer
- Chris Froome, cyclist
- Kuki Gallmann author
- Peter Hain, Labour Party politician
- Louis Leakey, archaeologist
- Richard Leakey, paleoanthropologist
- Bruce Mackenzie, politician
- Beryl Markham, aviator
- Juliet McMaster, novelist
- Eva Monley, film producer
- Derek Pringle, cricketer
- Bill Schermbrucker, academic
- John Spurling, author
- Carl Tundo, rally driver
- Roger Whittaker, singer-songwriter

=== Libya ===
- Lorenzo Bandini, racing driver
- Franco Califano, singer, composer and actor
- Vittorio De Sisti, film director and screenwriter
- Claudio Gentile, footballer
- Rossana Podestà, actress
- Valeria Rossi, singer
- Mario Schifano, painter
- Adriano Visconti, flying ace

=== Malawi ===
- Patrick Allen, actor
- Tony Bird, singer-songwriter
- Bronte Campbell, Australian swimmer
- Cate Campbell, Australian swimmer
- Annie Chikhwaza, missionary
- Lucinda Fredericks, equestrian athlete
- Kit Hesketh-Harvey, musical performer, translator, composer, screenwriter
- Michael Hill Blackwood, politician
- Richard Liversidge, naturalist
- Martin Roseveare, mathematician
- Malcolm Ross, guitarist
- James John Skinner, chief justice
- Jan-Jaap Sonke, politician
- Anthea Stewart, field hockey player

=== Mauritius ===
- Paul Bérenger, former prime minister
- J. M. G. Le Clézio, writer

=== Morocco ===
- Bibiana Fernandez, actress
- Just Fontaine, footballer
- Élisabeth Guigou, politician
- Roberto Lopez Ufarte, footballer
- Olivier Martinez, actor
- Jean-Luc Mélenchon, politician
- Luis Navarro, writer
- Jean Reno, actor
- Richard Virenque, cyclist

=== Mozambique ===
- Jorge Cadete, former footballer
- Ricardo Campos, footballer
- Carlos Cardoso, journalist
- Mia Couto, writer
- Roger De Sá, football manager
- Ruy Guerra, director and screenwriter
- Teresa Heinz, philanthropist
- Jojó, footballer
- Carlos Queiroz, football coach
- Otelo Saraiva de Carvalho, military officer
- Tasha de Vasconcelos, model
- Carlos Xavier, former footballer
- Al Bowlly, crooner
- Amanda DaCosta, football player
- Paulo Fonseca, football coach
- Costa Pereira, former footballer
- Guima, football player

=== Namibia ===
- Jacques Burger, rugby player
- Dan Craven, cyclist
- Tristan de Lange, cyclist
- Maike Diekmann, rower
- Trevor Dodds, golfer
- Till Drobisch, cyclist
- Erik Hoffmann, cyclist
- Adolph Jentsch, artist
- Vera Looser, cyclist
- Gert Lotter, cricketer and rugby player
- Stephan Louw, athlete
- Michelle McLean, Miss Universe 1992
- Percy Montgomery, rugby player
- Dirk Mudge, politician
- De-Wet Nagel, musician
- Du Preez Grobler, rugby player
- Oliver Risser, footballer
- Phillip Seidler, swimmer
- Manfred Starke, footballer
- Johannes van der Merwe, cricketer
- Raimar von Hase, farmer
- Anoeschka von Meck, writer
- Arend von Stryk, footballer
- Piet van der Walt, deputy minister
- Behati Prinsloo, model

=== Nigeria ===
- Christina Dodwell, adventurer
- Caroline Hawley, journalist
- Fiona Fullerton, actress
- John Godwin and Gillian Hopwood, architects
- Kevin McDaid, photographer
- Evelyn O'Callaghan, historian
- Cait O'Riordan, musician
- James Reyne, musician
- Edward Stourton, journalist
- Sussan Ley, politician
- Leo Hale Taylor, priest
- Hugo Weaving, actor
- Jeremy Joyner White, educationist

=== Senegal ===
- Jean-Pierre Bourhis, canoeist
- Jeanne Boutbien, swimmer
- Marcel-François Lefebvre, archbishop
- Marc Lièvremont, rugby player
- Ségolène Royal, French politician
- Viviane Wade, first lady

=== Seychelles ===
- Jean-Paul Adam, Minister of Health and Social Affairs
- James Mancham, first president (1976-1977)
- France-Albert René, second president (1977-2004)
- James Michel, third president (2004-2016)
- Gérard Hoarau, opposition leader
- Maurice Loustau-Lalanne, former Minister for Tourism

=== South Africa ===
- Raymond Ackerman, businessman
- Ken Andrew, politician
- Greg Albertyn, World and US Motocross Champion
- John-Lee Augustyn, cyclist
- Hugh Baiocchi, golfer
- Christiaan Barnard, heart surgeon
- David Bateson, actor
- Wendy Beckett, religious sister
- Mike Bernardo, kickboxer
- Brad Binder, MotoGP rider
- Matthew Booth, footballer
- Ricardo Nunes
- Jacobus Boshoff, voortrekker
- Francois Botha, professional boxer
- Louis Botha, politician
- P. W. Botha, former state president
- Pik Botha, diplomat
- Sandra Botha, Democratic Alliance leader
- Leon Botha, rapper and painter
- Sydney Brenner, biologist
- Breyten Breytenbach, anti-apartheid activist
- Jan Breytenbach, soldier
- Bles Bridges, singer
- André Brink, writer
- Schalk Burger, rugby player
- Zola Budd, track athlete
- Rory Byrne, Formula One designer
- Kitch Christie, onetime Springboks coach
- Sarel Cilliers, voortrekker
- Tim Clark, golfer
- Gerrie Coetzee, boxer
- J. M. Coetzee, novelist
- Hansie Cronje, cricketer
- Robyn Curnow, CNN International's anchor of International Desk
- Kevin Curren, tennis player
- Ian Davidson, politician
- Racheltjie de Beer, Afrikaner heroine
- Christiaan Rudolf de Wet, Boer commander
- F. W. de Klerk, former state president; worked towards ending apartheid
- Koos de la Rey, Boer commander
- Casper de Vries, entertainer
- Dricus Du Plessis, UFC world champion
- Natalie du Toit, swimmer
- Anri du Toit, actress and rapper
- Os du Randt, rugby player
- Sean Dundee, footballer
- Giniel De Villiers, rally raid champion
- Cromwell Everson, composer
- Schalk Ferreira, rugby player
- Wayne Ferreira, tennis player
- Darren Fichardt, golfer
- Bram Fischer, lawyer
- Mark Fish, footballer
- Mary Anne Fitzgerald, writer and journalist resident in Kenya
- Johnny Flynn, actor
- Bruce Fordyce, marathon athlete
- Jaque Fourie, rugby player
- Mark González, footballer
- Anton Goosen, musician
- Retief Goosen, golfer
- Nadine Gordimer, writer
- Sir Nigel Hawthorne, actor
- J. B. M. Hertzog, politician
- Penelope Heyns, swimmer
- Steve Hofmeyr, singer
- Butch James, rugby player
- Craig Johnston, footballer
- Piet Joubert, Boer commander
- Jacques Kallis, cricketer
- Olaf Kölzig, NHL hockey player
- Johan Kriek, tennis player
- Antjie Krog, writer
- Paul Kruger, politician
- Gé Korsten, singer
- Brett Kebble, businessman
- Alice Krige, actress
- Cornelis Jacobus Langenhoven, author of South African national anthem
- Chad le Clos, swimmer
- Tony Leon, politician
- Paul Lloyd, Jr, wrestler
- Bobby Locke, former golfer
- Adolph "Sailor" Malan, World War II Flying ace
- Daniel François Malan, former prime minister
- Dawid Malan, cricket player
- Magnus Malan, soldier
- Jeremy Mansfield, radio personality
- Eugene Marais, poet
- Victor Matfield, rugby player
- Dave Matthews, musician
- Elana Meyer, runner
- Shaun Morgan, musician
- Pieter Mulder, politician
- Elon Musk, business magnate
- Steve Nash, basketball player
- Ryk Neethling, swimmer
- Harry Oppenheimer, businessman
- Nicky Oppenheimer, businessman
- Alan Paton, novelist
- Francois Pienaar, rugby player
- Sasha Pieterse, actress
- Kevin Pietersen, cricketer
- Oscar Pistorius, athlete
- Gary Player, golfer
- Graeme Pollock, cricketer
- Andries Hendrik Potgieter, voortrekker
- Andries Pretorius, voortrekker, Pretoria founder
- Piet Retief, voortrekker
- Cecil Rhodes, Cape imperialist
- Justin Rose, golfer
- Anton Rupert, businessman
- Johann Rupert, businessman
- Ben Saraf, basketball player
- Jody Scheckter, Formula One driver
- Leon Schuster, comedian
- Harry Schwarz, lawyer
- Mark Shuttleworth, space tourist
- Troye Sivan, web star
- Frederik van Zyl Slabbert, politician
- Joe Slovo, South African Communist Party leader
- Jan Smuts, former prime minister
- Andre Stander, career criminal
- Martinus Theunis Steyn, politician
- Johannes Gerhardus Strijdom, former prime minister
- Helen Suzman, politician
- Janet Suzman, actress (niece of Helen Suzman)
- Basil Rathbone, actor
- Candice Swanepoel, model
- Charles Robberts Swart, politician
- Roland Schoeman, swimmer
- Michael Tellinger, scientist, author, leader of Ubuntu Party
- Eugène Terre'Blanche, Afrikaner Weerstandsbeweging leader
- ZP Theart, singer, vocalist of DragonForce
- Charlize Theron, actress
- J.R.R. Tolkien, writer
- Shaun Tomson, surfer
- Piet Uys, voortrekker
- Pieter-Dirk Uys, comedian
- Bok van Blerk, singer
- Irene van Dyk, netball champion
- Siener van Rensburg, Boer prophet
- Marthinus van Schalkwyk, politician
- Joost van der Westhuizen, rugby player
- Minki van der Westhuizen, model
- Hendrik Frensch Verwoerd, former prime minister
- Daniel Vickerman, rugby player
- Constand Viljoen, soldier
- Hans Vonk, footballer
- B. J. Vorster, former prime minister
- Arnold Vosloo, actor
- Jake White, rugby coach
- Watkin Tudor Jones, actor and rapper
- Helen Zille, Premier of the Western Cape
- Cliff Drysdale, tennis player and announcer
- Ted Toleman, Formula One team owner
- Andrew Surman, footballer

=== Tanzania ===
- Hilde Frafjord Johnson, Norwegian politician
- Alan Johnston, journalist
- Ricky Bartlett, actor and radio host
- Jane Goodall, British primatologist and anthropologist
- Jon Haylett, novelist
- Nico Ladenis, chef
- Sara Larsson, singer
- Hugo van Lawick, Dutch wildlife filmmaker and photographer
- Tim Macartney-Snape, mountaineer
- David Myatt, activist
- Michael Riegels, lawyer
- Alex Rontos, political adviser
- Raimund Schelcher, actor
- Werner Schuster, physician
- Leslie Scott, businesswoman
- Naomi Wilson, Australian politician
- Kai-Uwe von Hassel, German politician

=== Uganda ===
- Bob Astles, soldier and colonial officer
- Denis Parsons Burkitt, surgeon
- Sir Albert Cook, doctor
- Katharine Cook, doctor
- Ian Clarke, missionary, physician, Mayor of Makindye Division, Kampala
- Richard Gibson, actor
- Danny Keogh, actor
- Kathleen Grace Noble, rower
- Louise Pirouet, teacher
- Marcel Theroux, novelist

=== Zambia ===
- Greg Aplin, Australian politician
- Robin Auld, musician
- Wallie Babb, hurdle athlete
- Tina Beattie, theologian
- Craig Brown, canoeist
- Stewart Gore-Browne, soldier, politician
- Angus Buchan, evangelist
- Cecil Dennistoun Burney, businessman
- Jean Jacques Corbeil, missionary
- Norman Carr, conservationist
- Dan Crawford, missionary
- Joseph Dupont, bishop
- Phil Edmonds, cricketer
- John Edmond, singer
- Gabriel Ellison, co-designer of Zambian national flag
- David Fairbairn, painter
- Stanley Fischer, economist
- Ralph Goveia, swimmer
- Tawny Gray, sculptor
- A. C. Grayling, philosopher
- Neil Gregory, footballer
- Jimmy Haarhoff, footballer
- Trevor Haynes, runner
- Iain Hesford, footballer
- Dafydd James, rugby player
- V. M. Jones, author
- Corné Krige, rugby player
- David Livingstone, physician, missionary
- Robert John "Mutt" Lange, music producer
- Edna Maskell, hurdle athlete
- Tilka Paljk, swimmer
- Daran Ponter, New Zealand politician
- Lindsay Reeler, cricketer
- Alan Rusbridger, journalist
- Charlotte Harland Scott, first lady
- Guy Scott, former president
- Jackie Sewell, footballer
- Jeffery Smith, sprinter
- Wilbur Smith, novelist
- Richard Stephenson, footballer
- Peter Stimpson, cricketer
- Guus Til, football player
- Stevie Vann, singer
- Jeff Whitley, footballer
- Jim Whitley, footballer

=== Zimbabwe ===
- Miles Anderson, actor
- Roy Bennett, politician
- Macauley Bonne, footballer
- Byron Black, tennis player
- Cara Black, tennis player
- Don Black, tennis player
- Wayne Black, tennis player
- Erich Bloch, economist
- John Bredenkamp, businessman
- Catherine Buckle, writer
- Ryan Cairns, golfer
- Mike Campbell, farmer
- Marc Cayeux, golfer
- Maggie Chapman, Scottish politician and lecturer
- Liz Chase, field hockey player
- David Coltart, politician
- Rick Cosnett, actor
- Kirsty Coventry, swimmer and president-elect of the International Olympic Committee
- Christopher Cowdray, hotel manager
- Sean Crocker, golfer
- Eddie Cross, politician
- David Curtis, rugby player
- Chelsy Davy, onetime girlfriend of Prince Harry
- Brendon de Jonge, golfer
- Clifford Dupont, former Rhodesian president
- Lucia Evans, singer
- Dave Ewers, rugby player
- Andy Flower, cricketer
- Humphrey Gibbs, politician
- Peter Godwin, writer
- Bruce Grobbelaar, footballer
- Ernest Guest, politician
- Vangelis Haritatos, politician
- Ken Harnden, track and field coach
- Graeme Hick, cricketer
- Heidi Holland, journalist
- Nicholas van Hoogstraten, businessman and real estate magnate
- John Houghton, politician
- Richard Hope Hall, politician
- Graham Johnson, musician
- Timothy Jones, cyclist
- Iain Kay, farmer and politician
- Jock Kay, farmer and politician
- Bruce Keogh, surgeon
- Sam Levy, businessman and property developer
- Tony Johnstone, golfer
- Nigel Lamb, aviator
- Nate Landman, NFL player
- Doris Lessing, novelist
- Rusty Markham, politician
- Nicholas McNally, judge
- Mark McNulty, golfer
- Thomas Meikle, businessman
- Sebastian Negri, rugby player
- Denis Norman, farmer and minister
- Albert Alan Owen, composer
- Andrew Peebles, rower
- Nick Price, golfer
- Peter Purcell-Gilpin, rower
- Billy Rautenbach, businessman
- Conrad Rautenbach, rally driver
- Ronald Reid-Daly, soldier; leader of the Selous Scouts
- John Robinson, footballer
- Glen Salmon, footballer
- Ken Sharpe, businessman
- Alexander McCall Smith, writer
- Ian Smith, former Rhodesian prime minister
- Eli Snyman, rugby player
- Timothy Stamps, politician
- Trudy Stevenson, politician
- Sebastien Summerfield, footballer
- Gavin Sutherland, archer
- Wrex Tarr, entertainer
- Clem Tholet, singer
- Micheen Thornycroft, rower
- Garfield Todd, former Rhodesian prime minister
- Kevin Ullyett, tennis player
- Mark Vermeulen, cricketer
- Kieran Vincent, golfer
- Scott Vincent, golfer
- Peter Walls, soldier
- General Michael Dawson Walker, British soldier
- Nicola Watson, politician
- Roy Welensky, former Rhodesia and Nyasaland prime minister
- Peter Wetzlar, swimmer
- Guy Whittall, cricketer

=== Others ===
- Adeline André, Ubangi-Shari-born fashion designer
- Steve Barker, Lesotho-born former footballer
- Claudia Cardinale, Tunisian actress
- Lauriane Doumbouya, first lady of Guinea
- Gerardo Miranda, French West Africa-born footballer
- Mário Palma, Guinea-Bissau-born basketball coach
- Claude Simon, Madagascar-born novelist and recipient

== See also ==
- Afrikaners
- British diaspora in Africa
- White Africans of European ancestry
