= Brauhaus am Damm =

Brewery and restaurant in Rustenburg, South Africa

Brauhaus am Damm is a German micro-brewery, brew-pub and restaurant in Rustenburg, South Africa, overlooking the Olifantsnek Dam and Magaliesberg.

== History ==
Imke Pape is an ethnic German from Kroondal, the German community outside Rustenburg. She built the Brauhaus am Damm next to the Olifantsnek Dam on a piece of land of the farm she was born. She bought old equipment from a defunct brewery in Kwa-Zulu Natal that was originally imported from Austria. At the beginning of 2009, Pape and a group of friends started the assembly of the equipment at Olifantsnek Dam. She studied brewing for two years, reading every book she could on the subject. During this time Imke met a German brewmaster who stayed in Johannesburg, Heiko Feuring. He offered his expertise and together they brewed the very first Brauhaus beer in Imke’s kitchen. Today Imke’s "Dunkel" is still brewed according to the same recipe that they used in an old cooking pot. After a year of self-study Imke went to Europe and worked for a week in a brewery in Germany similar to the one at Brauhaus. From there she travelled to Vienna where the equipment of the Brauhaus brewery originated. The Brauhaus am Damm brewery was finally commissioned in August 2011.

In October 2019 the Schlotfeldt family took over the management of Brauhuas am Damm and renamed it to Brauhaus Afrika. They have since also installed a coffee roaster and opened a deli and gift shop.

== Beer ==
All of the beers are strictly brewed according to the Bavarian Reinheitsgebot of 1516. All beers are made from ingredients imported from Germany.

- Brauhaus Farmers Draught – Their Farmers Draught is along the lines of what many call a 'Lawnmower Lager', which is basically a clear, light alcohol lager which you can sip after a hot day of gardening without feeling too full or tipsy.
- Brauhaus Pils – The Pils is a Pilsner with slightly higher alcohol content than the Draught. It also boasts a fuller taste and is suited to those looking for something a little different to a Castle Lite, but still maintaining an overall refreshing and light taste.
- Brauhaus Dunkel – The Dunkel is a good balance of rich toasty flavours from darker malts and refreshing, Lager smoothness.
- Brauhaus Weizen – A clear and fresh wheat beer which is unique because wheat often causes a little haze in the beer.

== Food ==
All food served at Brauhaus am Damm is either traditional German cuisine, or a modern fusion with local flavours.
