= Kadzamira =

Kadzamira may refer to:

- Boniface Kadzamira, Malawian parliamentarian who pushed for the legalization of cannabis
- Cecilia Kadzamira, official hostess of Malawi during the reign of president Hastings Banda
- Zimani Kadzamira, Malawian academic, civil servant and diplomat
