= Ward Simpson =

Businessman, bible teacher and media executive

- Born: Barbados
- Citizenship: American
- Occupations: Businessman, Bible teacher and media executive
- Known for: CEO of GOD TV
- Spouse: Lydia Simpson
- Children: 3
- Parent(s): Sir Kyffin Simpson and Lady Roberta Simpson

Ward Simpson is an American businessman, Bible teacher and media executive. He was appointed president and CEO of GOD TV on 1 October 2016. Originally from Barbados, he has lived in the United States for 20 years.

== Early life ==
Simpson is the son of Barbadian businessman and philanthropist, Sir Kyffin Simpson and his wife, Lady Roberta Simpson. After growing up in Barbados, he became a senior executive with his families business the Simpson Group of companies, managing an international automobile distribution corporation.

== Career ==
During the Brownsville Revival, which started in 1995 with John Kilpatrick and Steve Hill, Simpson attended the Brownsville Revival School of Ministry (BRSM) in Pensacola, Florida and became its executive director. .

Simpson is a member of Church of His Presence led by John Kilpatrick, where he is often a featured speaker.

He joined GOD TV in October 2015 as global operations manager and now serves as the network's president and chief executive officer. The announcement was made by GOD TV founder Wendy Alec in a live broadcast marking the network's 21st Birthday. Simpson hosts 'Today With Ward' on GOD TV.

== Personal life ==
Simpson is married to Lydia and they have three children, Rafael, Netanya and Nathan.
