= Rory Alec =

South African music producer

Rory Alec Stephen
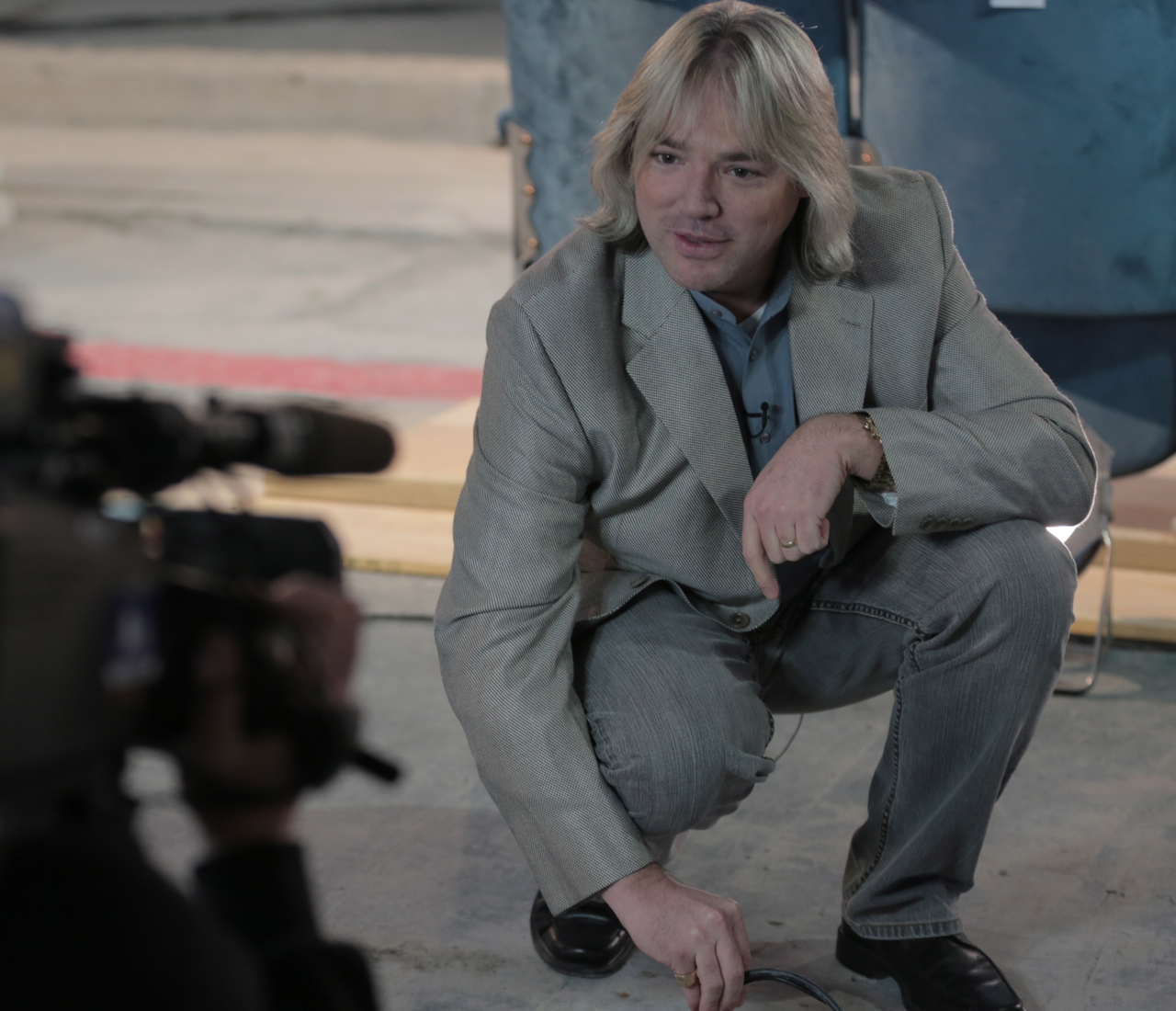
- Born: Rustenburg
- Occupation: TV/Music Producer

Rory Alec Stephen, better known as Rory Alec, is a South African Christian broadcaster and media executive. He co-founded the GOD TV network in 1995, and was Chief Executive Officer from 1994 to 2014. Alec is now pursuing other projects in film, television, staging and music through a new company called The Internationals.

== Early life ==
Born in Rustenburg in 1968, Alec grew up in South Africa and was an avid musician as a child, playing the drums and piano. After leaving school, he spent two years in the South African military and moved to Johannesburg where he started working in the advertising industry.

Alec married Wendy Alec in 1987, and separated in 2014, established the TV commercial production house Alec-Gene Productions. In 1991 they moved to the UK where they launched Europe's first daily faith-based TV network in 1995. The couple divorced in 2015.

== GOD TV ==
Alec’s grew GOD TV into a global television network with markets in locations such as Hong Kong, opening new transmitters in Africa; visiting GOD TV's regional offices (Chennai, India) and filming reports of how Christianity is affecting specific communities, from South America (Bogota, Colombia) to the Middle East (Baghdad, Iraq)

During his travels Alec met with heads of state, such as Sri Lankan President, Mahinda Rajapaksa during a trip to Colombo in 2013. Alec has led several mass tours to Israel, with 1,800 pilgrims in 2008.

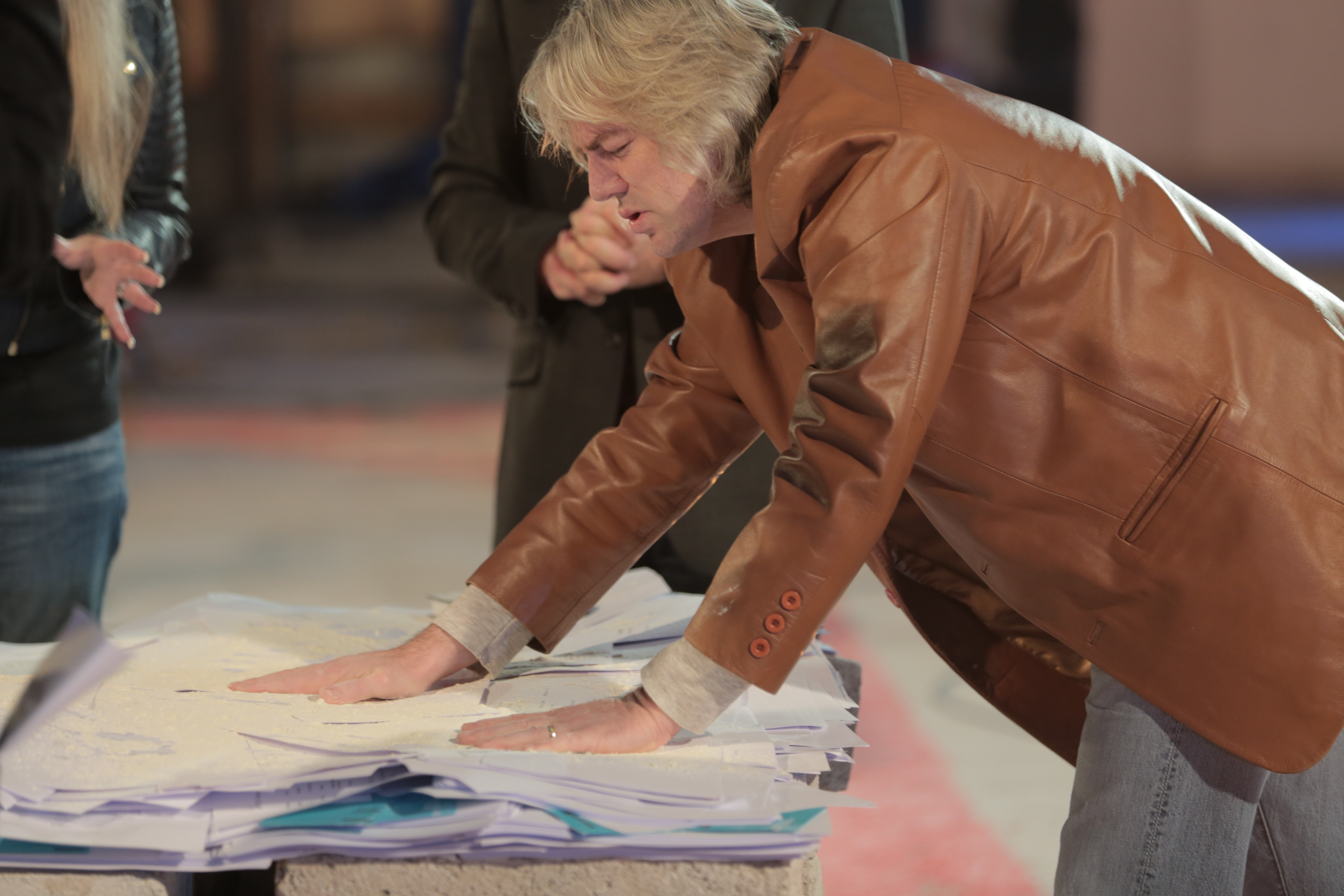
Rory Alec in Plymouth, praying for viewers on GOD TV.

According to Christian Broadcasting Network (CBN), Alec's vision for GOD TV was "for every household in the world to receive the Gospel of Jesus Christ through media."

Alec hosted regular series on GOD TV. He was the co-host of Behind the Screens; and Apocalypse & the End Times.

Alec resigned from GOD TV on 2 October 2014. "After 20 years of service, I have had a moral failure this year. For this reason, I am stepping down," he said. "Please forgive me for the disappointment I’ve caused. It is with a heavy heart that I confirm my season with GOD TV is over for now.”

== Charitable work ==
During his time at GOD TV Alec supported many community development projects, particularly in his home continent of Africa, including a children's feeding programme in his home town of Rustenburg. He led mission trips to Kenya, Tanzania, Uganda, Malawi and South Africa, delivering aid to areas that face extreme poverty.

In July 2010, Alec visited East Africa with Pat Boone to open a community development center in Tanzania after the American singer, actor and writer partnered with GOD TV to provide foundational funding for the facility, which provides a Maasai community with much needed health services and clean water.

An orphanage Alec supports is Kondanani Children’s Village in Malawi, founded by Annie Chikhwaza which has named its Paediatric Clinic after him. He was also involved with the Jewish National Fund / Land of Promise Foundation with the aim of planting one million trees in Israel as part of the revitalization of the Negev desert.
