= WestProp Holdings =

Real estate development company

WestProp Holdings Limited
- Formerly: West Property Company (Pvt) Limited
- Company type: Public
- Traded as: WPHL on the VFEX
- Founded: September 27, 2007; 18 years ago in Harare, Zimbabwe
- Founder: Ken Sharpe

WestProp Holdings is a real estate development company in Zimbabwe. It is the first real estate company to be listed on the Victoria Falls Stock Exchange.

== Background ==
WestProp Holdings Ltd, formerly West Property Company Pvt Ltd was founded in 2007 by Kenneth Sharpe as a publicly traded property development company. The company is known for its flagship developments projects that include Gunhill Rise, Millennium Heights, Pokugara residential estate and mixed use smart city projects at Pomona city, Warren Hills Golf Estate and Mall of Zimbabwe, a joint venture with Exemplar.

In 2023, WestProp Holdings was approved for listing on the Victoria Falls Stock Exchange becoming the first real estate company to list on the VFEX and the listing became the first equity capital raise by way of preference shares in an Initial Public Offering (IPO) on the VFEX stock market.

== Awards ==
- Company of the Year - National Property Services Industry awards 2020
- Zimbabwe Top 100 Business Brands of the Year 2020
- Real Estate Company of the year – Megafest Business Awards 2021
- Best Residential Development 20+units Zimbabwe - African and Arabian Laufen International Property Awards 2022 (Dubai)
- Real Estate Development Company of the year – Zimbabwe Infrastructure Investment Summit and Awards 2022
- Top 20 outstanding organisations for the year 2022 – Megafest Business Awards
- Best Property Developer, Best Land Developer – Zimbabwe Business Awards 2023
- Company of the year (construction industry) – Zimbabwe Business Awards 2023
- Organisation of the year 2023 - African Achievers Awards
