= Ken Sharpe =

Zimbabwean businessman

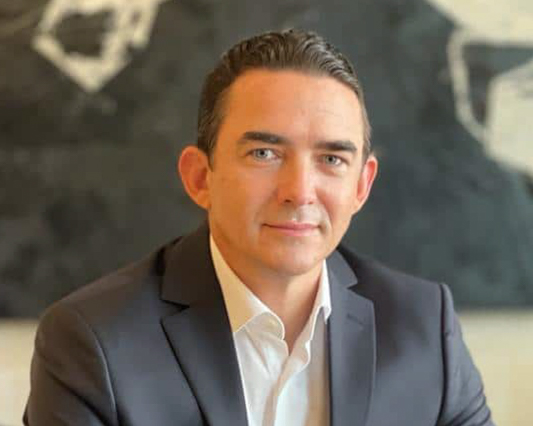
- Born: Kenneth Raydon Sharpe; January 27, 1973 (age 53); Salisbury, Rhodesia
- Education: Harvard Business School
- Occupation: Businessman
- Years active: 1991 – present
- Known for: Entrepreneurship, Property development
- Website: www.kennethsharpe.com

Kenneth Raydon Sharpe (born January 27, 1973), is a Zimbabwean businessman, philanthropist and real estate developer. He is the chief executive officer of WestProp Holdings He is also the first Zimbabwean to receive Forbes Africa Best of Africa Most Innovative CEO Award.

== Background ==
Ken Sharpe was born in Harare, Zimbabwe and he grew up in Mazowe, Bulawayo and on Tafuna Mountain in Shamva. He was born to Kenneth Robert Sharpe and Elaine Loretta Sharpe in Harare. He attended junior and senior school in Zimbabwe, South Africa, and the United Kingdom.

== Career ==
Sharpe started his business career in 1991 when he established the West Group, a confectionary and food distribution company which had operations in Zimbabwe, Zambia, Malawi, Mozambique and South Africa. With operations in South Africa, he also established InterAfrica Franchise Bottlers in South Africa.

In 2006, West Group in partnership with a Ukrainian businessman Oleksandr Sheremet, was renamed to West Property Company, which is a real estate development company with two notable projects, Kuwadzana 4 Extension a housing project of approximately 4,500 residential homes and Mainway Meadows of 2,300 homes. His company WestProp won the awards in Best Residential Development 20+units Zimbabwe and top Developers Zimbabwe categories at the African and Arabian Laufen International Property Awards 2022, in Dubai.

In 2005, Sharpe joined the World Economic Forum, Young Presidents Organisation (YPO) as the “Doing Business in Africa” and the “Family Philanthropy Network”, he was appointed chairman of the initiatives. He has previously served as the Chapter Forum Chair, Education Chair and was the youngest Chapter Chairman in 2008, he resigned this post in 2015.

In 2017, Sharpe teamed up with American JW Oliver and co-founded an outsourcing company, Global BP Soluions. Global BP Solutions has since rebranded and is now known as ZimWorX. He was accepted into the prestigious HBS OPM 3-year program in 2019 and graduated as an Alumni in 2022. He also graduated from Harvard Business School and when he did his final dissertation on strategy, he launched the 1 Billion bricks by 2050 agenda.

In his business career of 20 years, the businesses Sharpe opened to form West Group include West Food Distribution, West Beverages, West Agencies, Intercrop, West Sanitary Pads Manufacturing, West Tech, West Oils, FellowGold Mining, West Star Cash n Carry and Augur Investments Ltd. These trading divisions has activities in the SADC region, including operations in Zimbabwe, Zambia, Malawi, Mozambique, and South Africa.

In 2022, Sharpe’s Augur Investments dismissed allegations of misappropriation of council land in response to the High Court challenging its mention in a land dispute. The Zimbabwe Anti-Corruption Commission had cleared Augur Investments and Ken Sharpe of any wrongdoing.

In 2023, Sharpe's company West Property Company listed on the Victoria Falls Stock Exchange as WestProp Holdings becoming the first property development company to list on the new exchange.

== Personal life ==
Sharpe is married to Joanna, they got married in 1993 and have two children: a daughter and a son, the latter who they fostered in 2008. Sharpe was raised Anglican but converted to The Church of Jesus Christ of Latter-day Saints (Mormonism) in 2007.

== Awards ==
- Zimbabwe National Business & Leadership Awards – Entrepreneur of the year
- The Zimbabwe Top 100 Business Brands of the year awards – Businessman of the Year
- Forbes Best of Africa Innovative CEO of the year award 2021
- Zimbabwe National Chamber of Commerce – 2021 Businessman of the Year
- Megafest Business Awards 2019 – Top 10 Men in Business of the Year
- Megafest National Leadership Awards – Leader in Real Estate of the Year 2021 Platinum Award
- African Achievers Awards 2023 – Award for Innovation
