= Joe Manduwa =

Malawian politician (born 1960)

Joe Manduwa (born 1960 in Chimbalanga village under traditional authority Dambe in Neno, Southern Region, Malawi) is a Malawian politician. He served as a deputy minister and Member of Parliament of Malawi for Mwanza East for the United Democratic Front. He is most remembered for advocating the legalization of chamba, Malawi Gold. He is described as bold, frank, and rogue.

== Political career ==
He became a Member of Parliament under the United Democratic Front ticket in 1999. He became Deputy Minister of Agriculture in the Bakili Muluzi administration. He later became the Deputy Minister of Agriculture. He was replaced as minister in 2000 due to a pending court trial and gave his duties to Ludoviko Shati. He was also fired together with Jan-Jaap Sonke for not supporting Bakili Muluzi's third term bid. According to the Associated Foreign Press report, he was later fired from the UDF in 2002 for investigating allegations of government involvement in illegally selling tons of maize during the Malawian drought of 2002. His seat was declared vacant by Sam Mpasu but the Malawian courts ruled against the government and he remained Member of Parliament until 2004.

=== Legalizing marijuana ===
He is most known for advocating the legalization of Marijuana in Malawian Parliament. He suggested in parliament that Malawi begin to produce chamba (Malawi Gold) for non-medicinal use as a viable replacement for its main official export tobacco. this call was backed by medical doctor and Member of Parliament for Malawi Congress Party, Hetherwick Ntaba.

=== Aphrodisiac ===
He has also advocated the sale and marketing of a locally made herbal aphrodisiac as an export in order to lift the nation out of poverty.

=== Maize scandal ===
While he was the chairman of a 19-member Parliamentary Committee on Agriculture, he was involved in investigating a maize scandal that was blamed for the Malawi's 2002 food crisis. He was charged with investigating the illegal sale of more than 160,000 tonnes of maize from the strategic grain reserves in the midst of the 2002 severe drought and famine which left the country with a 600,000-tonne food shortfall. Two million Malawians faced starvation due to this sale. Manduwa was fired over this investigation a few weeks before he was set to present the findings of the report to parliament without an explanation. Manduwa noted that "This is a move to block me from investigating some top people who are involved, whom we have uncovered". His dismissal was later reversed in court and he continued to serve in the role until 2004 when he lost re-election as an independent.
