= GOD TV =

Evangelical Christian media network

- Type: Religious broadcasting
- Country: United Kingdom, United States, Israel, India, Australia, Africa, Asia
- Availability: Satellite worldwide, Cable and Terrestrial in some countries, Online.
- Headquarters: Jerusalem, Plymouth, Chennai, Orlando
- Owner: Owned by several Angel Charities globally. Worldwide broadcast licence is held by Angel Christian Television Trust Inc
- Key people: Wendy Alec
- Launch date: 1995
- Former names: Christian Channel Europe, GOD Digital
- Official website: www.god.tv www.godtv.com

GOD TV is a word of faith Christian media network that started in the United Kingdom. The network's main offices are located in Plymouth, England, UK, and Orlando, Florida, US. Regional offices are situated in India, Sri Lanka, South Africa, Kenya, Ghana and Australia.

GOD TV's original productions have won awards from the Christian Broadcasting Council of the UK. Its schedule has five regional variations: USA; UK & Europe; Africa; Asia and Australasia, each with local programming.

== History ==
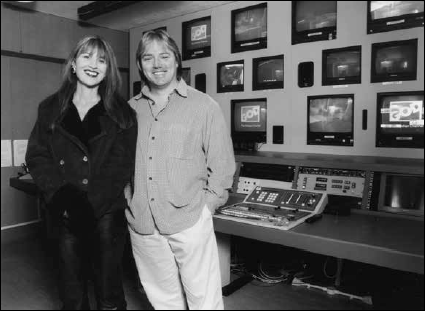
Rory and Wendy Alec in GOD TV's first transmission suite in Newcastle, England.

GOD TV was founded by Rory and Wendy Alec in England in 1995 as the Christian Channel Europe, the Continent's first daily Christian television network. It started broadcasting on 1 October and was on air for three hours each day, broadcasting between 4am and 7am. This increased to seven hours (4am to 11am) in 1997 and 24 hours in 1999. The 'GOD' logo appeared in 1997 and the Christian Channel was rebranded as the GOD Channel. The GOD Channel became part of the Dream Family Network, later known as GOD Digital and then GOD TV in 2002. The same year GOD TV's broadcast uplink was moved to Israel. This provided for international expansion via satellite and GOD TV was launched across Africa and Asia with new offices in Cape Town and Chennai.

In 2003, a GOD TV office was established in the US in Orlando, Florida, and in 2005 GOD TV launched across Australia and New Zealand. GOD TV launched on DIRECTV, America's largest satellite platform in 2006, and opened a new office in Colombo, Sri Lanka, in 2008. GOD TV also expanded into China during 2008. Further offices were opened in Nairobi and Melbourne in 2009.

Rory Alec was the network's CEO from 1995 to 2014, when GOD TV announced his resignation due to "moral failure." The couple divorced in 2015. Wendy Alec attributed the end of their marriage to Satan leading her husband to have an affair. Wendy Alec took over as president and CEO, a position she held for two years, before appointing Ward Simpson.

Communications scholar Pradip N. Thomas places the history of GOD TV into the larger context of a neo-imperialist project within Christian fundamentalism, comparing GOD TV's Christian Zionist messages to Franklin Graham's travel to wartime Baghdad, which Graham presented as a triumph of Christianity over Islam. Thomas notes that in India, GOD TV provides a platform for a "closing of ranks" among different Indian Christian groups, allowing an expression of Christian unity which is partly a reaction against Hindu nationalism.

In 2014, the network can reach 262 million homes worldwide including 93 million homes in India and employs 200 people with Ward Simpson as president and CEO.

== Programming ==
The network heavily promotes the teachings of the New Apostolic Reformation (NAR), a neo-charismatic movement, and of Pentecostal Christian minister Paul Cain

In 2008, GOD TV's viewership doubled as it broadcast the Lakeland Revival, with evangelist and faith healer Todd Bentley, nightly. It featured an apostolic alignment ceremony in which NAR leader C. Peter Wagner and other NAR apostles brought Bentley, who they saw as an apostolic leader, under their wing.

Much of GOD TV's programming caters to a youth audience. The network aims to air 'relevant youth programming' that comprises series and events from leading youth ministries and featuring bands such as Leeland, Switchfoot, Rend Collective, Jars of Clay, Guvna B and Newworldson.

GOD TV publishes content by Exodus International and Focus on the Family that advocates for conversion therapy, the pseudoscientific practice of attempting to change sexual orientation.

GOD TV themed series support causes such as ending human trafficking. Themed weekends have included The Persecuted Church season and the Refugees #LoveYourNeighbour Season.

== Criticism ==
According to the BBC, GOD TV was criticized by the organizations Pride in Plymouth and Plymouth Humanists for inviting televangelist Andrew Wommack to "publicly preach discrimination towards LGBT people" at an annual gathering in 2015.

David Amsalem, Israeli Minister of Communications, warned GOD TV's Israeli affiliate in May 2020 that it may be in violation of a law against proselytising and risks being shut down. It was later determined to violate said law and was ordered off Israeli airspace a month later in June.

In 2002, television satirist and critic Victor Lewis-Smith described GOD TV's programming as "hour upon hour of hate-filled, rabble-rousing, homophobic bigotry, much of it featuring (and funded by) right-wing American evangelists".

== Regional programming ==
GOD TV has several specific regions, each with its own regional director and office overseeing local content, distribution and providing viewer services. The regions are: the USA; UK, Europe, Scandinavia and Nordic countries; Africa and East Africa; Asia and the Middle East; Israel; Sri Lanka and Australasia.

=== United States ===
GOD TV launched in the US in 2006 on DirecTV. It is also available in some US cities via cable.

GOD TV launched in Orlando, Florida, in 2012 via WACX's second subchannel over-the-air; some GOD TV programming is also seen on the station's main schedule. As part of the Orlando launch, the Bay Revival on Tour was broadcast from Calvary Assembly of God in Winter Park with John Kilpatrick, Nathan Morris and Lydia Marrow. The network maintains an office in Orlando.

=== Europe ===
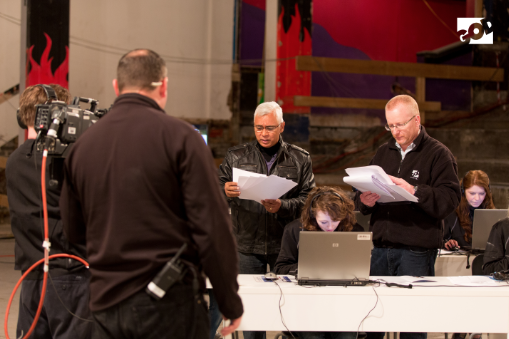
GOD TV broadcasting live from Plymouth in 2014

The Angel Foundation is GOD TV's registered charity in Europe, and is regulated by the Charity Commission for England and Wales. Based in Plymouth, the Angel Foundation states that it is committed to "the advancement of the Christian religion and education, and the relief of poverty, distress and sickness." As of 2010, GOD TV was "potentially available to up to 14 million homes in the UK".

Fergus Scarfe is GOD TV's Regional Director for the UK & Ireland, based in Plymouth Chris Cole – Broadcaster is a trustee of the Angel Foundation.

GOD TV's programming has won awards from the UK Christian Broadcasting Council, including Best Live Event Programme in 2011 for Angus Buchan's Mighty Men Event and Best Youth Programme for Soul Survivor Extra.

Some European networks carry GOD TV in their satellite and cable television packages in Belgium, France, and Germany.

=== Africa ===
Angel Television Africa was established in South Africa in 2002 and GOD TV launched across Africa on 31 May of the same year. Marcél Olivier is GOD TV's Regional Director for Africa and heads up the office in Cape Town. Erastus Maina oversees GOD TV's East Africa Region, with an office in Nairobi.

GOD TV's programming can be accessed across Africa via satellite. It can be watched via ViewSat covering 20 million homes across Sub-Saharan Africa on the IS20 satellite. In Kenya, GOD TV is carried on Kiss TV.

Angus Buchan's Mighty Men Conference was transmitted live on GOD TV from South Africa, with 400,000 men in attendance, and evangelist Reinhard Bonnke was filmed live from Nigeria.

=== Asia ===
Angel Christian Charitable Foundation India was founded in 2002 with an office in Chennai headed by Thomas Robinson.

GOD TV can be viewed by cable in cities across India; Indian Television.com includes GOD TV in its list of "best-known spiritual channels." Local programming includes Indian evangelist Sam P. Chelladurai.

GOD TV has broadcast a 'Middle East Special' helping to provide food for beleaguered Christians and Muslims in war-torn Iraq.

==== Israel ====
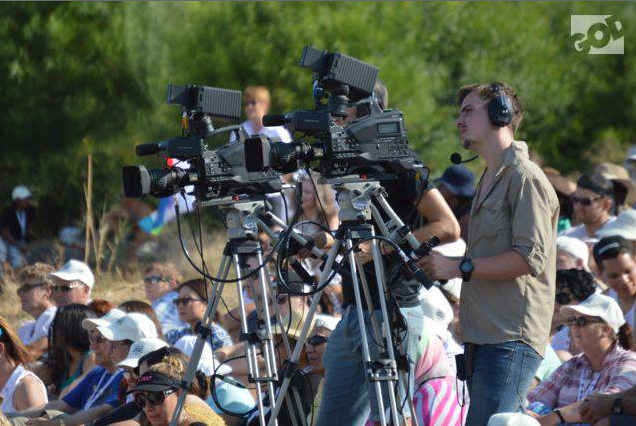
GOD TV Camera Crew on location in Israel.

The network hosts tours to Israel which include visiting Bible sites and staging events that are broadcast worldwide. The largest tour to date was in 2008 with 1,800 tour-goers who attended 'A Celebration of Israel's 60th Anniversary'. Held at the Davidson Center alongside the Western Wall in the Old City, this was attended by both Jewish and Christian guests. GOD TV's Arise Zion Tour took place in 2018 as part of Israel's 70th Anniversary celebrations.

In 2009, GOD TV partnered with the Jewish National Fund (JNF) US$500,000 to plant trees on land said to be inhabited by Bedouin tribes in Israel's Negev region. A coalition of Jewish and Arab human rights groups denounced the project, accusing GOD TV and the JNF of teaming up to force the Bedouin out of the area to make way for Jewish communities.

GOD TV's CEO Ward Simpson was in Israel in October 2017 at the invitation of the Israeli government, to address a Christian Media Summit in Jerusalem.

In June 2020, the channel was ordered to shut down for violating the country's laws concerning proselytism.

==== Sri Lanka ====
GTV Lanka Foundation is GOD TV's company in Colombo, with David Nicolle as regional director. Dialog Satellite Television, Sri Lanka Telecom and Apstar Satellite carry GOD TV in Sri Lanka. GOD TV has supported Sri Lankan victims of the Asian tsunami.

=== Australia ===
Angel Christian Television Australia Limited was established in 2005 enabling GOD TV to be watched on the Optus D2 satellite. GOD TV's office for this region is in Melbourne and is managed by Wayne Knapman.

Local content in Australia includes series such as Victory Life Church - Margaret Court; PlanetShakers and Brian Houston @ Hillsong TV as well as conferences from Hillsong, Stairway Church, Arise NZ, Influencers and C3 Church.

Corrective Services Queensland has allowed Instal-Life to provide equipment enabling inmates across the state to access GOD TV in their cells. Prisons in Western Australia have also installed GOD TV, and it is available in other rehabilitation centres and remote indigenous communities.

The Melbourne office also manages Hong Kong, Macau and Greater China. Macau Cable has been broadcasting the GOD TV signal into Macau since 1 October 2006. GOD TV launched its Greater China service on 16 October 2008 and has televised events from China. The Kingdom Culture Conference has aired on GOD TV from Hong Kong.

== Charitable work ==
In Malawi, it cares for HIV/AIDS orphans by supporting Kondanani Children's Village, founded by Annie Chikhwaza, and is involved in various charitable initiatives in Sri Lanka. In the UK, it supports Mercy Ministries, a charity helping young women suffering from abuse.

GOD TV has raised funds to help Christians in Iraq at St George's Church in Baghdad, through a Middle East Special.
