= Dutch Reformed Church, Rustenburg =

Church in Rustenburg, South Africa

Coordinates: 25°40′18″S 27°14′44″E

Dutch Reformed Church
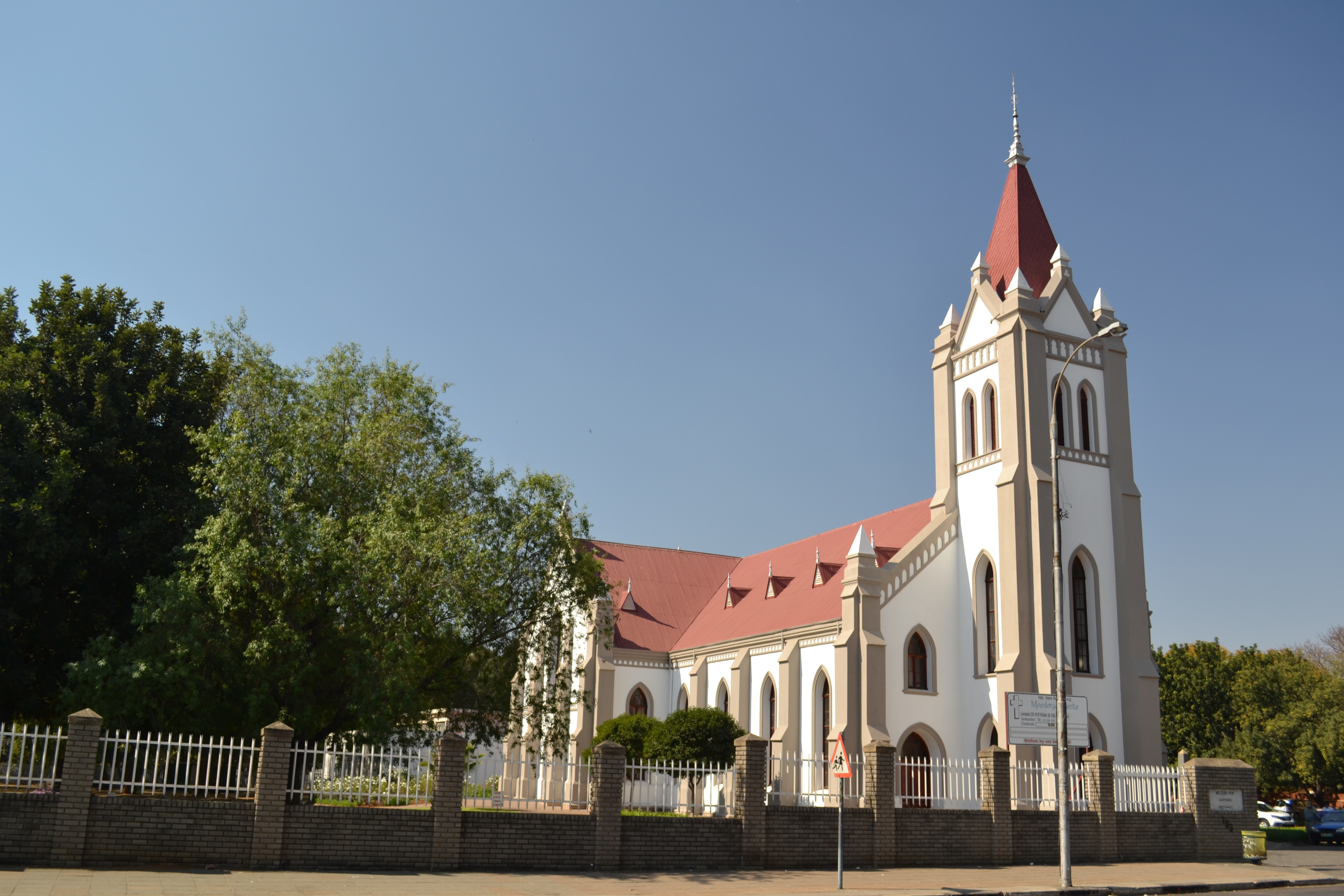
- Dutch Reformed Church
- Location: Rustenburg
- Country: South Africa
- Denomination: Nederduits Gereformeerde Kerk

History
- Founded: 1850

Architecture
- Functional status: Church

The Dutch Reformed Church in Rustenburg is the second oldest congregation of the Dutch Reformed Church north of the Vaal River and approximately the 43rd oldest congregation in the entire church. It is the mother congregation of the NG Church in the city of Rustenburg.
