= North West FM =

South African commercial radio station

- Rustenburg; South Africa
- Broadcast area: North West Province
- Frequency: 89.9 - 103.9 MHz

Programming
- Format: Urban music
- Affiliations: United stations, Motswako media

History
- First air date: 28 February 2008

Links
- Website: www.northwestfm.co.za

North West FM (also known as Radio North West) is a South African Commercial radio station based in Rustenburg in the North West Province.

== Changes ==
Debbie Williams was appointed as the brand manager effective from 1 September 2012. Mr. David Tsutsa Mabusela was appointed station manager in 2013.

On 1 December 2012 a new Programme Manager, Mathapelo Monaisa, was appointed to the station. She later resigned in 2013 and joined Kaya FM as Bob Mabena's Producer. Mr Patrick Maloyi was then appointed as the programmes manager until late 2014 when he resigned as well.

== Coverage areas and frequencies ==
The station broadcasts in these areas and in FM on the following frequencies throughout South Africa. The station is also now available to neighbouring Pretoria

Coverage areas and frequencies
Area	Freq.
Rustenburg	89.8 MHz
Swartruggens	89.8 MHz
Zeerust	93.5 MHz
Mmabatho/Mafikeng	91.8 MHz
Lichtenburg	91.8 MHz
Ventersburg	-
Klerksdorp	97.0 MHz
Schweizer Reineke	97.3 MHz
Vryburg	-
Taung	91.9 MHz

Pretoria 103.9

== Broadcast languages ==
- English
- Tswana

== Broadcast time ==
- 24/7

== Target audience ==
- LSM Groups 6 – 10
- Age Group 25 - 49
- Educated middle class adults

== Programme format ==
- 60% Music
- 40% Talk

80% Setswana 20% English

== Listenership figures ==
Estimated listenership
	7 day	average Mon-Fri
May 2013	450 000	179 000
February 2013	498 000	190 000
December 2012	480 000	180 000
October 2012	476 000	173 000
August 2012	533 000	203 000
June 2012	532 000	212 000

== Location ==
The station's physical address is:
Unit 1, Delta Place, Mabe Business Park, 17 Kgwebo Avenue, Rustenburg
