= Sam P. Chelladurai =

- Born: 7 December 1952 (age 73); Chennai, Tamil Nadu, India
- Occupations: Pastor; Speaker, Televangelist
- Spouse: Dr. Manju Chelladurai
- Children: Jeevan Chelladurai, Priyadarshini Chelladurai
- Website: RevSam.Org

Sam P. Chelladurai (Tamil: சாம் பி.செல்லதுரை) is the senior pastor of the Apostolic Fellowship Tabernacle (more commonly known by its initials, AFT), a megachurch in Purasawalkam, Chennai. He is best known for his successful television programs, which are televised church services that predominantly feature his sermons. His Tamil language program, Vettriyum Vaazhvum (Victory and Life), which aired on DD Podhigai, was viewed by Tamil audiences all over India. His English Program, "God is Good" aired on "GOD TV" which was well-received among the youth. In addition to being televised, all of his church services are also "webcast" live on his website as well as on his church's YouTube channel. His other ministries include the Full Gospel Bible Institute, Campaign India (an Evangelistic outreach program), and teaching seminars throughout South India and other countries occasionally.

== List of television programs ==
- Tamil language | Tamil broadcast – Nambikkai TV, DD Podhigai TV (former)
- English language | English broadcast – Good News TV, GOD TV (former)
- Hindi language | Hindi broadcast – Shubhsandesh TV
- Live broadcasts – Salvation TV, Holy God TV (former), JTK TV (former)

== The Full Gospel Bible College ==
He is the principal of 'The Full Gospel Bible College', which offers degree courses such as Diploma in Theology (D.Th.) and Bachelor of Theology (B.Th.).
