= Fatima Bhyat =

Fatima Bhyat (Areff) is noted for being one of the first residents of Rustenburg, South Africa, settling in 1877. In addition, she is noted for being one of the eldest residents, featured in the local newspaper the Rustenburg Herout at age 100 and died in August 1971 aged 112. At 95 years old, Mrs. Bhayat added her voice against the Group Areas Act of 1950, which proposed to move all Indians out of town. Church Street in Rustenburg was renamed to Fatima Bhayat Street in honour of her and the local Indian population in Rustenbug in 1999.

== Relationship with Paul Kruger ==
Fatima Bhyat and husband Suliman always welcomed Paul Kruger to their home for meals when he visited Rustenburg. They supported him during the Anglo Boer War by supplying him from their store, and as a token of his appreciation, Paul Kruger rewarded the Bhyat's for their support in gold. Fatima was one of a few women recognised as part of the "South African Indians who's who"
