= Jan-Jaap Sonke =

Malawian politician

Jan-Jaap Jakobus Sonke is a Malawian architect, mechanical engineer and politician and was Member of Parliament in Malawi from 1999 until 2004. He is a Malawian of Dutch descent. He is a former Deputy Minister of Finance and Economic Planning, and of Public Works of Malawi. He was fired for not supporting Bakili Muluzi's third term bid, as was Joe Manduwa Deputy Minister of Agriculture.

== Career ==
Sonke worked in Kenya as a volunteer in the Coffee Industry assisting Cooperative Coffee Societies from 1966 till 1968. After that studied Architecture at the Eindhoven University of Technology in the Netherlands. He moved to Malawi in 1975 to work as an architect for the churches in the Christian Service Committee. Sonke joined the Malawi Housing Corporation as chief architect in 1979, but simultaneously started his own company ECO systems ltd producing solar water heaters, which he managed eventually full time from 1986. Sonke was involved in the pressure groups who eventually managed to establish a multi party democracy in Malawi. He was elected a Member of Parliament for the United Democratic Front party under the Bakili Muluzi administration in 1999. He fell out of grace and was fired from the party because of his opposition against the president's bid to change the constitution which would have allowed the president a third term. He quit politics, and established his own architectural practice, but later acquired another architectural firm, Clinton and Evans, which he is now managing. Sonke re-joined the United Democratic Front in October 2013 and is campaigning to re-claim his Parliamentary seat.

== Personal life ==
Sonke was born in the Netherlands in 1945, but at the age of 5 his parents moved as mission teachers to former Dutch New Guinea (Now West Papua). Sonke studied in the Netherlands for his engineering and architectural degrees. He lived in Kenya for two years where he married his first wife Catherina Van Benthem, whom he later divorced. He moved to Malawi in 1975 where he still lives. He acquired Malawi Nationality in 1994. He has four children from his first wife, two of whom live in Malawi, two in the Netherlands. He is married to Thokozani Khuphwathea.
