= Wendy Alec =

British author and TV host

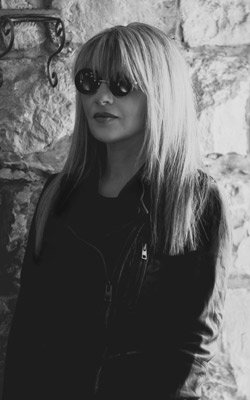
- Born: Welbeck Street, London, England
- Occupations: TV network founder, author
- Notable work: Chronicles of Brothers

Wendy Alec is a British writer, TV producer, film-maker, and director of WarBoys Entertainment London. She has written seven books, including the epic fantasy series, Chronicles of Brothers. She co-founded the GOD TV network in 1995 and presided as Director of Television and Creative Director for 21 years. In 2016, she left to pursue her writing career along with the development of her production company, Warboys Entertainment. In 2024, she hosts a TV program on The Bible Network.

== Early life and career ==
Alec was born in London, England. After leaving school, she trained in speech, drama, and music. She began her career in advertising in the early 1990s, first as a copywriter and then as a creative director. Alec was trained in screenwriting by her mentor in Hollywood, screen doctor Ron Suppa, professor at UCLA's Extension Screenwriting Programme.

== God TV ==
Alec co-founded GOD TV with Rory Alec in 1995 as the UK and Europe's first daily Christian television network - broadcasting two hours a day on Rupert Murdoch's SKY platform. The network grew rapidly over the past 21 years, with a broadcast reach of 951 million viewers in 2016.

For almost three decades, Alec worked as GOD TV's Creative Director and Director of Television responsible for the network's international branding and programming line-up. She has also been the network's president. Alec was the host of Word From The Heart and An Evening With Wendy on GOD TV.

Alec has represented GOD TV at several international conferences including the Women on the Frontlines World Convention 2015 at Angelus Temple in Los Angeles and the Empowered21 Jerusalem 2015 Global Congress.

Alec and her husband divorced in 2014. She stepped down as CEO of GOD TV in 2016.

== Book publications ==
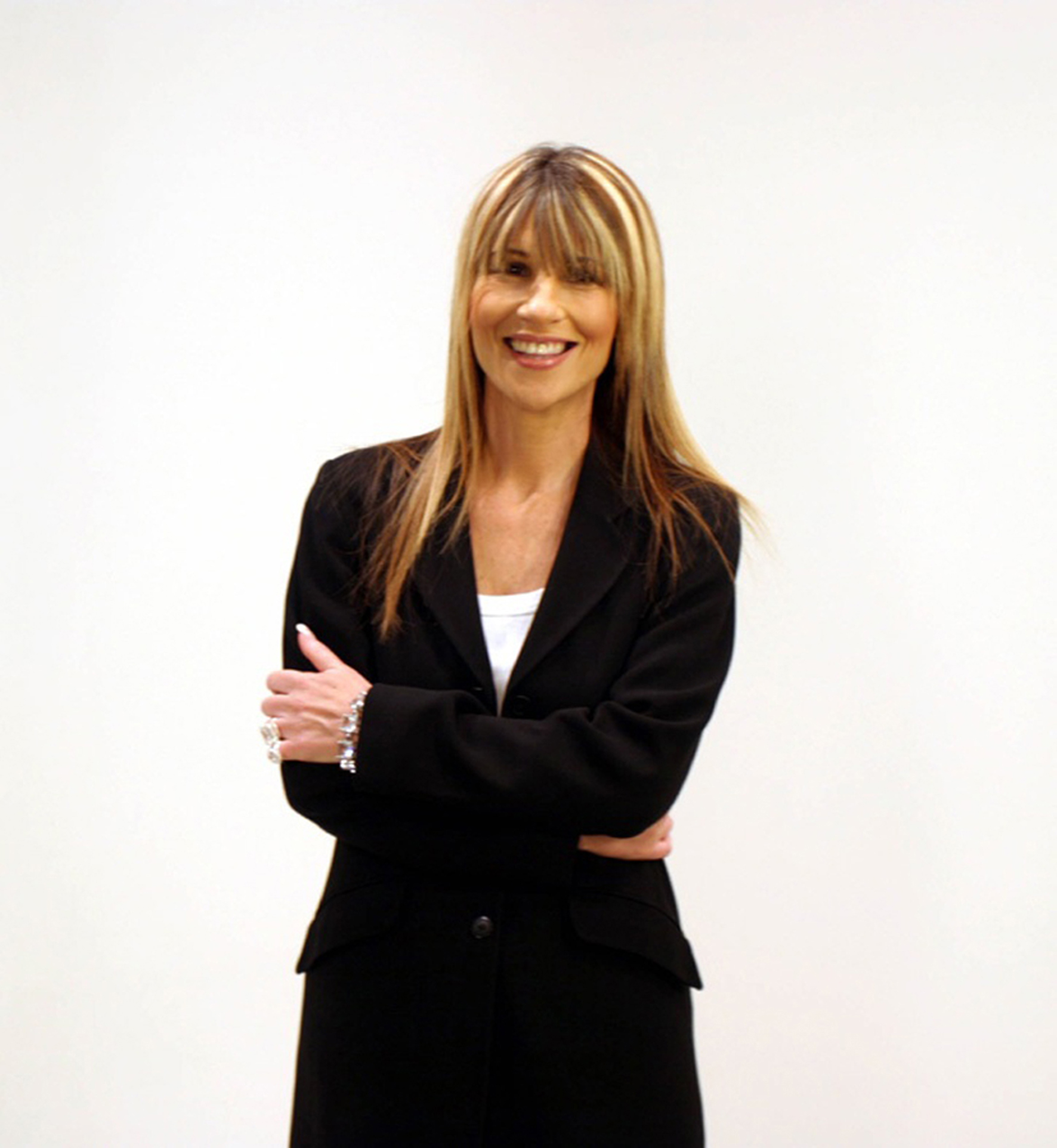
Alec in 2005

Alec published an autobiography, Against All Odds, in 2001.

Alec published the first book in her Chronicles of Brothers series, The Fall of Lucifer, in January 2006. She published the second book, Messiah-The First Judgement in November 2007, Son of Perdition in December 2009, and A Pale Horse in December 2012. With nearly a million books sold, in 2009 she turned her hand to screenwriting, already having completed the first screenplay, The Fall of Lucifer, and currently developing Chronicles into a TV series in the genre of 'Game of Thrones'.

She is also the author of 'Journal of the Unknown Prophet', which is presented as a prophetic revelation given to her by God. Visions From Heaven - Visitations To My Father's Chamber is Alec's second best-selling 'prophetic' journal. She has completed Book Five of the Chronicles Series, End Of Days, which was published by HarperCollins in Autumn 2018.

After her divorce, she published Wounded Warriors: Out of the Wilderness.

== Awards ==
Alec has been recognised for her work at In the media arena with a Global Platinum Award from the Global Media Summit in 2016.

She has also received awards from the Christian Broadcasting Council of the UK for her work on projects including The Global Day of Prayer Live. and Gold awards for 'Best Ministry TV Program' and 'Best Music TV Programme'. Underneath her leadership at GOD TV as Director of Television, her production teams won over 20 Angel Awards.

Alec has also received awards for her writing. She received an 'Outstanding Contribution to Literature Award' for Chronicles of Brothers and the Journal of the Unknown Prophet, all four of Chronicles won the Best Fiction Award at Eden (the UK's largest online Christian Bookstore), and she also received the award for 'Outstanding Fiction Writer' for Chronicles of Brothers in the Exceptional Writers Awards.
