= Rustenburg =

Town in North West province, South Africa

- City
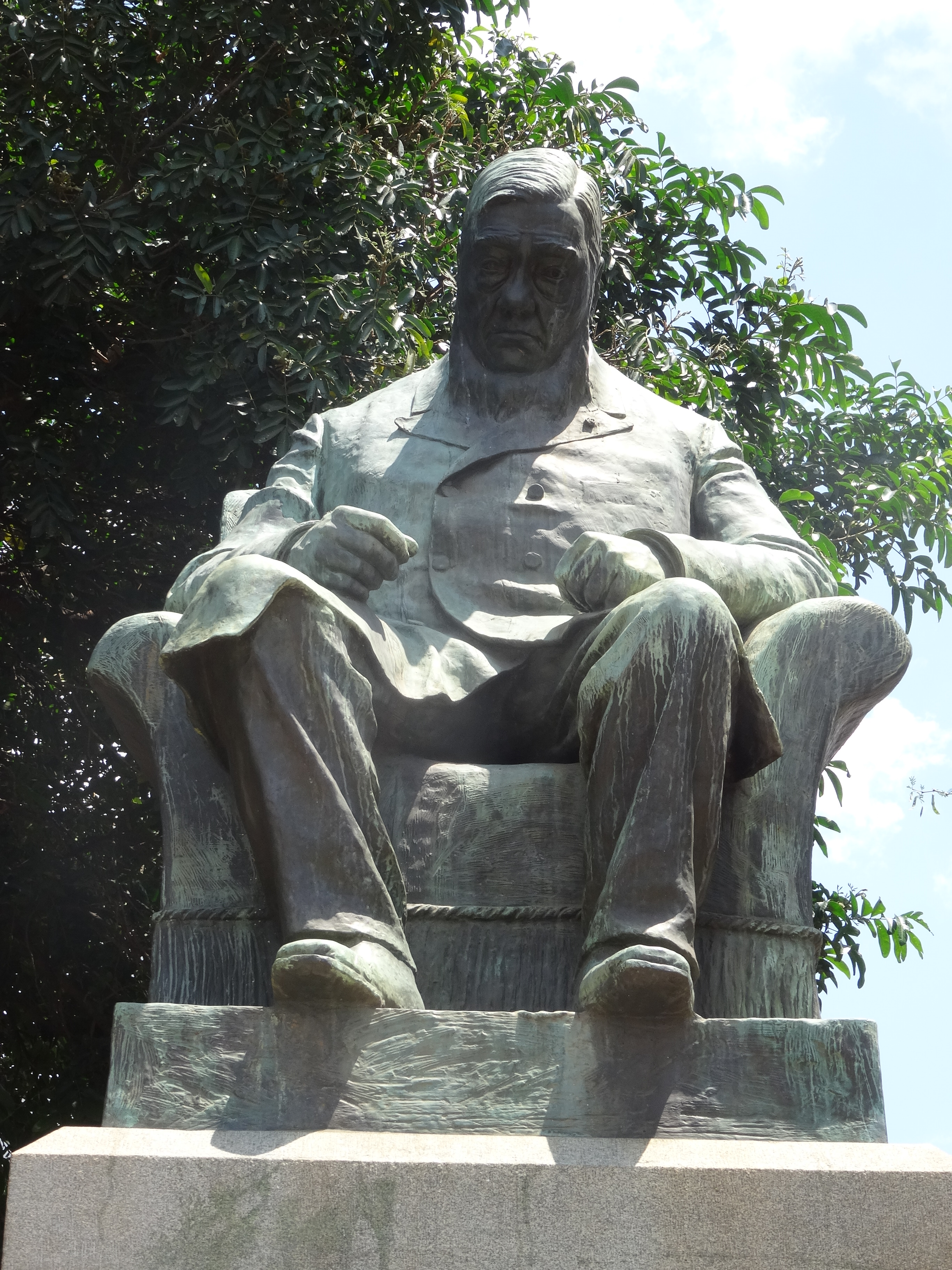
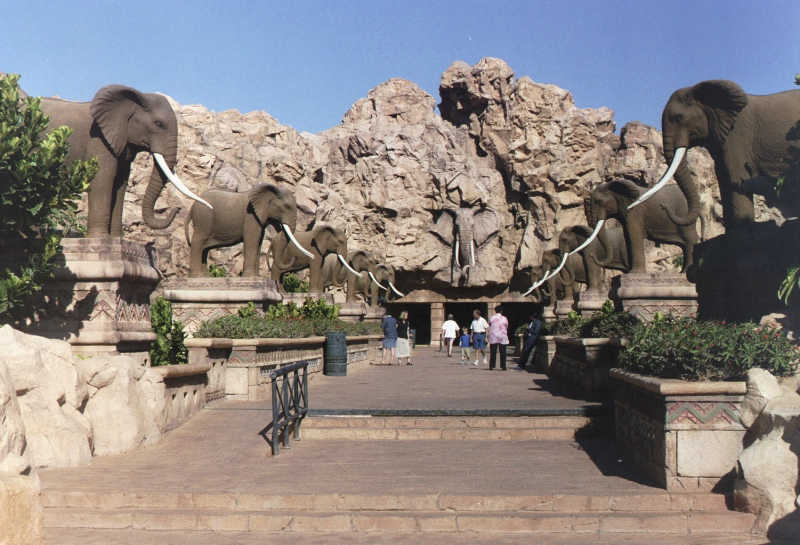
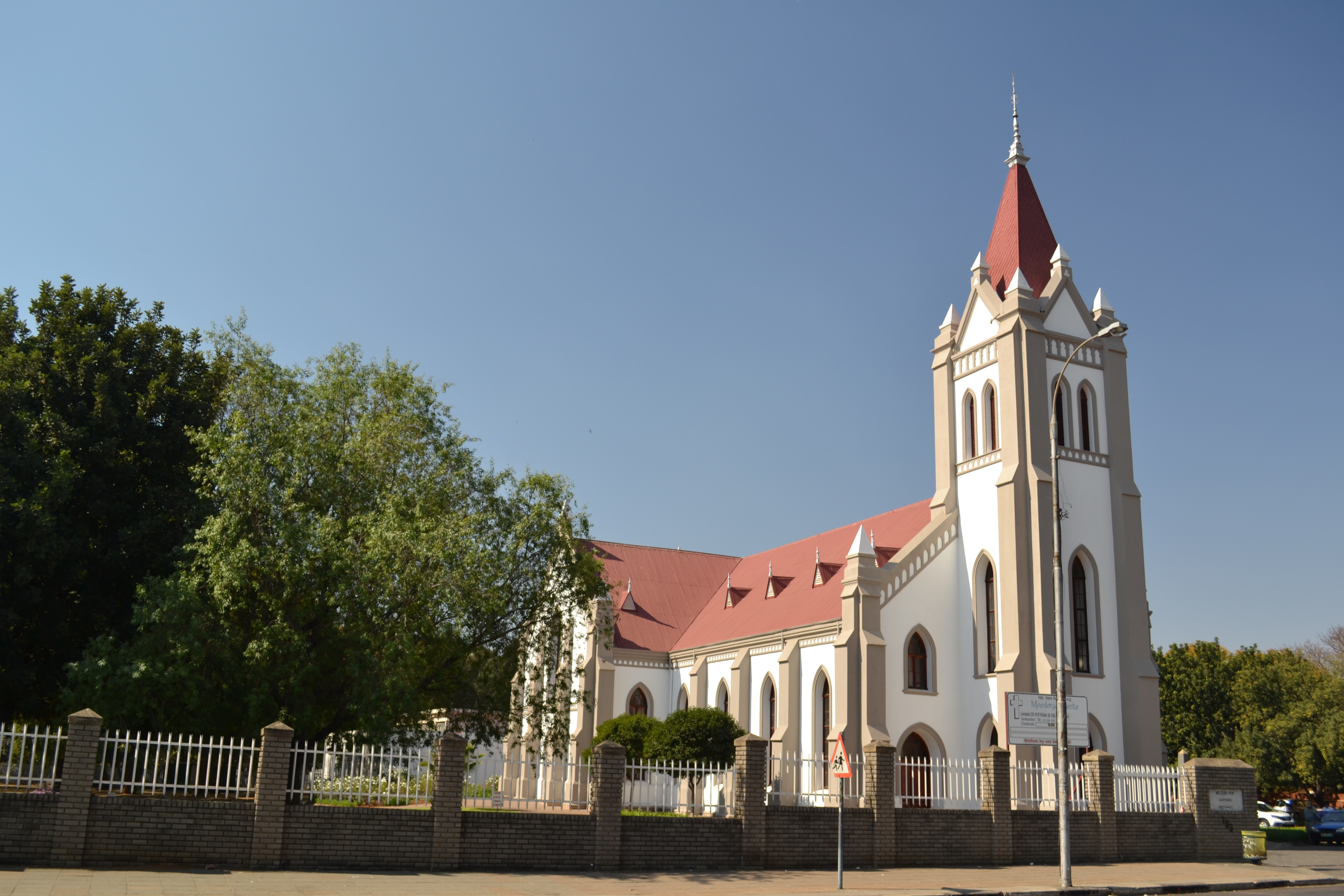
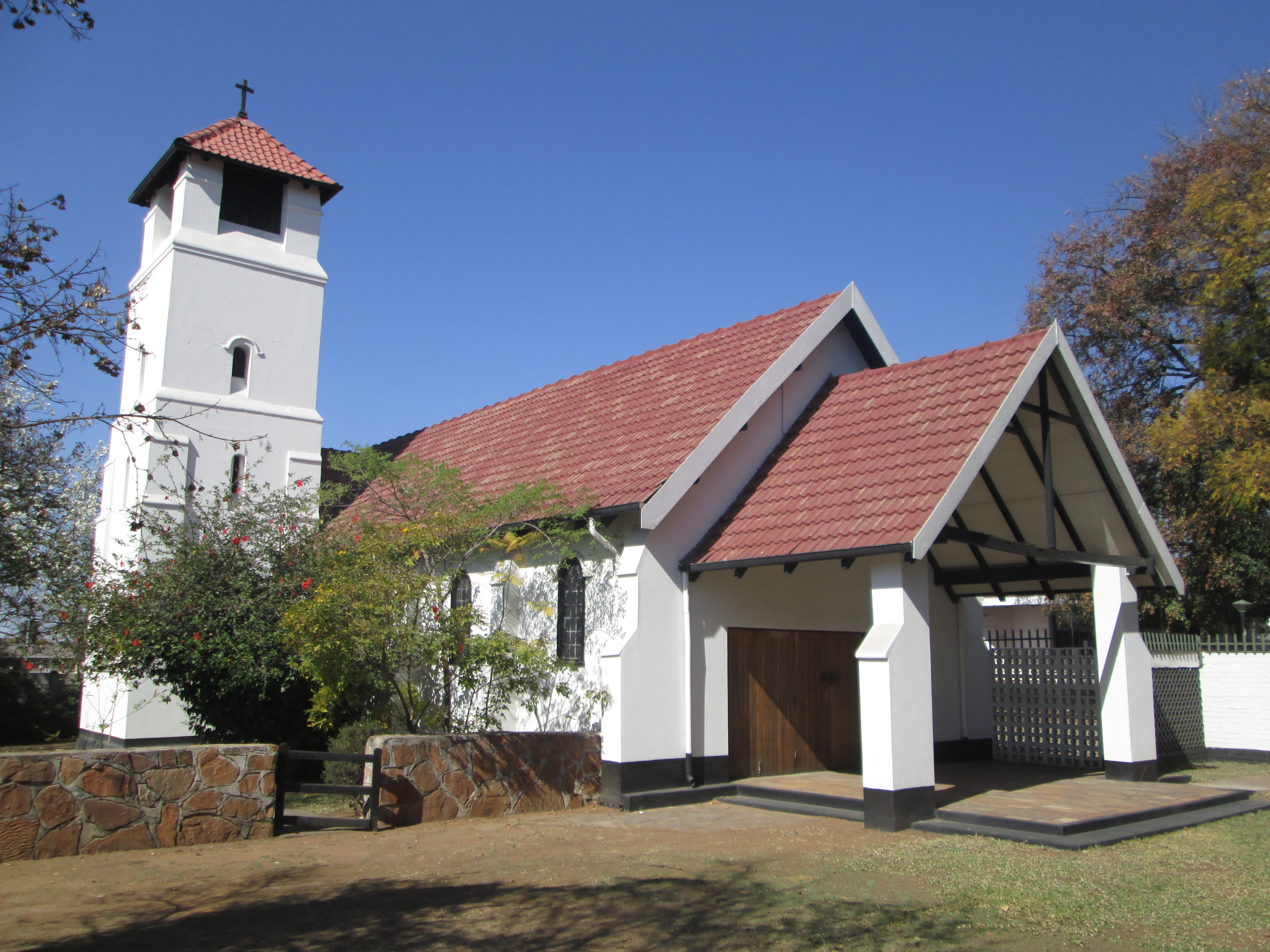
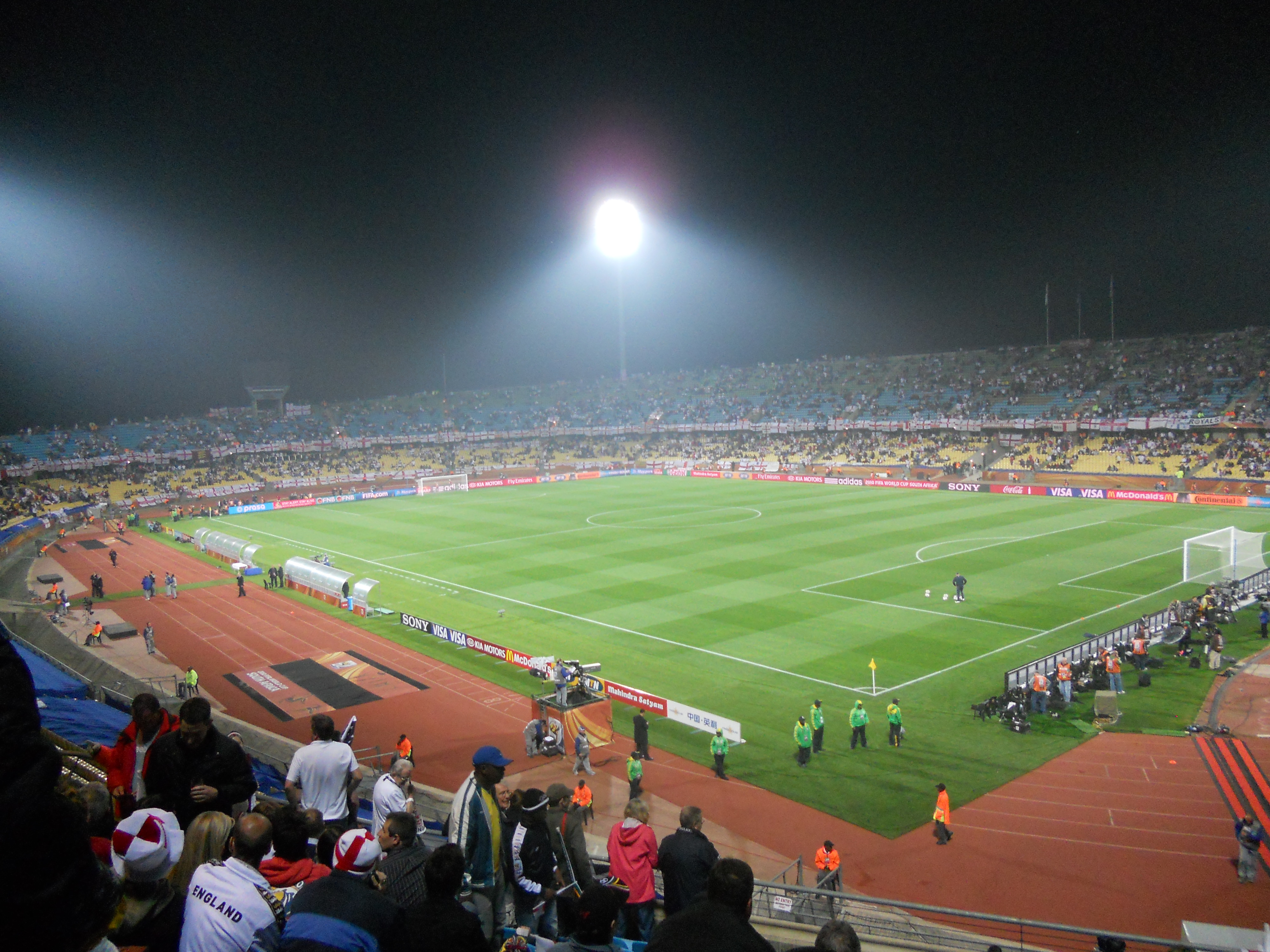
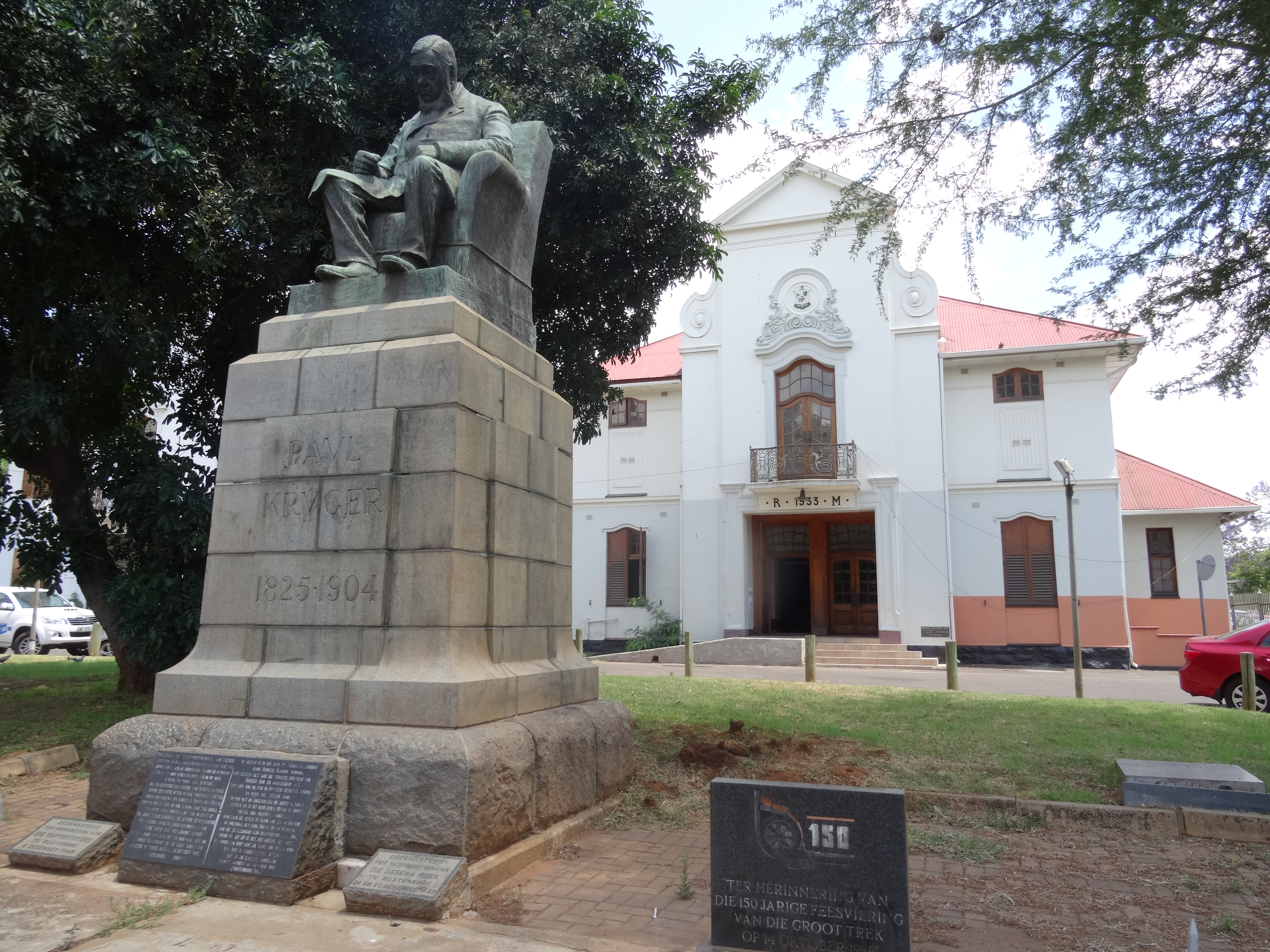
- Paul Kruger Statue Sun City Resort Dutch Reformed Church Building Old Anglican Church Building Royal Bafokeng Stadium Rustenburg City Hall

- Location within North West (South African province) Location within South Africa Location within Africa
- Coordinates: 25°40′00″S 27°14′34″E
- Country: South Africa
- Province: North West
- District: Bojanala
- Municipality: Rustenburg
- Established: 1851; 175 years ago

Government
  - Type: Municipal ward
  - Mayor: Sheila Mabale-Huma (ANC)

Area
  - Total: 282.42 km^{2} (109.04 sq mi)
- Elevation: 1,170 m (3,840 ft)

Population (2011)
  - Total: 549,575
  - Density: 1,945.9/km^{2} (5,040.0/sq mi)

Racial makeup (2011)
  - Black African: 52.9%
  - White: 40.4%
  - Indian/Asian: 3.3%
  - Coloured: 2.8%
  - Other: 0.6%

First languages (2011)
  - Afrikaans: 41.2%
  - Tswana: 27.9%
  - English: 11.9%
  - Sotho: 4.0%
  - Other: 15.0%
- Time zone: UTC+2 (SAST)
- Postal code (street): 0300
- Area code: 014
- Website: Rustenburg Local Municipality

Rustenburg (/ˈrʌstənbɜːrɡ/; Afrikaans pronunciation: [ˈrœstənbœrχ], Afrikaans and Dutch: Town of Rest) is a City at the foot of the Magaliesberg mountain range. Rustenburg is the most populous city in North West province, South Africa (549,575 in 2011 and 626,522 in the 2016 census). In 2017, the city's Gross Domestic Product (GDP) reached ZAR 63.8 billion, accounting for 21.1% of the GDP of the North West Province, and 1.28% of the GDP of South Africa. Rustenburg was one of the official host cities of the 2010 FIFA World Cup, being in close proximity to Phokeng, the capital of the Royal Bafokeng Nation, where the Royal Bafokeng Stadium is located. The England national football team also used this as their base camp for the tournament.

== History ==
=== Mfecane ===
Before European settlers arrived, the area had been settled by agrarian Setswana-speaking tribes.

Rustenburg's population is primarily Tswana people. Partially belonging to the Royal Bafokeng Nation, extensive landowners earning royalties from mining operations. The Royal Bafokeng are descendants of Sotho settlers who displaced the local tribes from the region, which they came to call 'place of dew' (Phokeng). In the early 1800s, the Bafokeng and other Tswana communities were conquered in a series of devastating wars launched by an offshoot of the Zulu kingdom, called the Matebele. The Boers had also fought the Zulu and Matebele, and so the Boers and Tswana found in the Matebele a common enemy. The Tswana and Boers planned together and worked toward defeating the Matebele from a Sotho-Tswana kingdom to the south, and together, they defeated the Matebele. As the Boers settled in the area, called their settlement Rustenburg because they had relatively friendly relations with their Bafokeng allies in the area, and after the many violent military conflicts with other African chiefdoms, such as the Matebele, they believed they could rest ("rusten" in Dutch) in this settlement, whose name literally means "Resting Town." Although had already long lived in the area when the Boers arrived, the Bafokeng bought land rights from the Boers, and they purchased their first tracts of land in the late nineteenth and early twentieth century from the colonial rulers, some in exchange for serving in the Boer Wars. Although these land purchases were technically illegal, Paul Kruger, who would become a president of the Transvaal Boer Republic, but was then a veld kornet, was friendly to the Bafokeng and helped arrange many of these purchases. A public hospital has been named after Paul Kruger.

=== Establishment ===
Rustenburg was established in 1851 as an administrative centre for an Afrikaner farming area that produced citrus fruit, tobacco, peanuts, sunflower seeds, maize, wheat and cattle. On 10 February 1859, the Reformed Churches in South Africa was founded under a Syringa tree, now commemorated with a memorial. Rustenburg was the home of Paul Kruger, president of the South African Republic, who bought a 5 square kilometer farm to the north-west of the town in 1863. The homestead on his farm, Boekenhoutfontein, is now the Paul Kruger Country Museum. When the Boer and the British came to blows in the Second Boer War (1899), the territory around Rustenburg became a battlefield. The two sides clashed at nearby Mafikeng, where the British garrison found itself under siege for months.

Among the early residents of Rustenburg were settlers of Indian origin. One of the first families of Indian origin was the Bhyat family, whose contribution to the city's history was marked by the renaming of a major street name to Fatima Bhayat Street in honour of Fatima Bhyat who arrived in Rustenburg with her husband in 1877.

Platinum mining in Rustenburg began in 1929, shortly after the discovery of the Platinum Reef by Hans Merensky, later named the Merensky Reef. The mine is located about 3 km from the town centre and owned and managed by the Anglo American plc. According to legend, the farmer that owned the land sold the mineral rights to Anglo American for R10 000.

=== Apartheid ===
The city was known for its conservative character during the apartheid era, and attracted large campaign rallies by the National Party.

=== Post-Apartheid ===
The township of Boitekong on the northeast side of Rustenburg has one of the highest incidences of AIDS orphans in South Africa Rustenburg was the venue for World AIDS Day commemoration in December 2010. The township is in a geographical area which bears the brunt of the catchment area of the toxic effects of the mining industry coupled with a very poor quality of water supply from the local Bospoort Dam, the water from which was for decades considered too toxic for human consumption until water shortages in the nineties compelled the purification and supply to Boitekong. Life for the majority under the rule of the 'Royal Bafokeng' has parallels to the apartheid era. In the Apartheid era, forced removals of old settlements were on the basis of racial divide whereas now it is done for installation of massive mining operations sometimes engulfing entire villages.

The Royal Bafokeng company own the stadium selected as a World Cup 2010 venue, the only 'private' stadium that hosted games in the 2010 World cup. The Royal Bafokeng regard themselves as a 'separate nation' which is in contradiction to the Rainbow nation espoused by Desmond Tutu and Nelson Mandela. This 'nationhood' is regarded by many today as a divide and rule tactic orchestrated by the mining conglomerates which has subsequently led to the calls for nationalization of the mining industry by the ANC Youth League. The majority of people in the region 20 years after the fall of apartheid still live in abject poverty despite the massive profits yielded by the platinum royalties. This has led in recent years to claims of kleptocracy against the 'royal' family and land claim disputes.

Agriculture in the region has been in constant decline since the decimation of the vast citrus estates of Rustenburg in the 1970s and 1980s due to pollution from increased smelting and beneficiating processes by mines. There are only a fraction of the original citrus farms remaining.

In 1990, the first post-Apartheid conference between the Nederduits Gereformeerde Kerk (the Dutch Reformed Church in Africa) and the South African churches was held in Rustenburg. During this conference, professor Willie Jonker of the University of Stellenbosch made this confession on behalf of the entire DRC:

"[I] confess before you and before the Lord, not only my own sin and guilt, and my personal responsibility for the political, social, economic and structural wrongs that have been done to many of you and the results [from] which you and our whole country are still suffering, but vicariously I dare also to do that in the name of the NGK [the white DRC], of which I am a member, and for the Afrikaans people as a whole."

The conference finally resulted in the signing of the Rustenburg Declaration, which moved strongly toward complete confession, forgiveness, and restitution.

== Geography ==
=== Topography ===
Rustenburg is at the foot of the Magaliesberg Range in South Africa, positioned on the Highveld Plateau, at an elevation of 1,217 meters (3,993 ft) above sea level with a minimum of 1,028 m and a maximum of 1,756 m. The terrain includes a mix of urban, mining and natural areas such as the Magaliesberg Biosphere Reserve.

Rustenburg has a drainage flowing in a northward direction. it includes 3 rivers and other water bodies.

- Hex River serves as an arterial drainage for Rustenburg, it flows northward and the catchment covers the area, water in Hex river is conveyed to Bospoort Dam which supplies water to the platinum mines and residential and commercial areas in the central region of Rustenburg.
- Elands River flows into the Crocodile River making it a larger catchment system.

There are numerous smaller rivers and spruits acting as tributaries to the Hex River.

=== Nature reserves ===
Key attractions in this area include the nature reserves around Rustenburg. This includes:

- Kgaswane Nature Reserve is situated above the town of Rustenburg, In Waterfall Park, Cashan across a varied habitat of quartzite mountain peaks, it is open to hikers as well as vehicle visitors. It is a 4,257 ha reserve.
- Madikwe Game Reserve and Groot Marico Park are large reserves north of the Pilanesberg, almost half the size of Belgium. They are conservation and transition zone between the Kalahari sandveld and the thornveld. Madikwe hosts all the major plains species, including the Big Five and has the second largest concentration of elephants in South Africa.
- Pilanesberg National Park is one of the most accessible South African game reserves. It is located a 1.5-hour drive from Johannesburg and Pretoria, outside Rustenburg. It is the fourth largest National Park in South Africa and is set in the Pilanesberg range, traversing the floor of a long-extinct volcano. Pilanesberg conserves all the major mammal species including lion, leopard, elephant, rhino and buffalo.

=== Climate ===
Rustenburg has a humid subtropical climate (Köppen Cwa), with a relatively high degree of diurnal temperature variation due to the high elevation. It has very warm summers (from December to February) and mild winters (from June to August). Due to the altitude, summers are not quite as hot as one might expect. Precipitation occurs mainly in summer. There is occasional frost at night in winter.

Climate data for Rustenburg
Month	Jan	Feb	Mar	Apr	May	Jun	Jul	Aug	Sep	Oct	Nov	Dec	Year
Mean daily maximum °C (°F)	30.3 (86.5)	29.4 (84.9)	28.3 (82.9)	25.5 (77.9)	21.6 (70.9)	20.4 (68.7)	20.9 (69.6)	23.7 (74.7)	27.3 (81.1)	28.7 (83.7)	29.4 (84.9)	30.1 (86.2)	26.5 (79.7)
Daily mean °C (°F)	23.8 (74.8)	23.1 (73.6)	21.7 (71.1)	18.3 (64.9)	14.9 (58.8)	11.8 (53.2)	11.8 (53.2)	14.4 (57.9)	18.5 (65.3)	20.8 (69.4)	22.1 (71.8)	23.1 (73.6)	18.7 (65.7)
Mean daily minimum °C (°F)	17.1 (62.8)	16.8 (62.2)	15.0 (59.0)	11.2 (52.2)	6.5 (43.7)	3.2 (37.8)	2.8 (37.0)	5.1 (41.2)	9.6 (49.3)	12.9 (55.2)	14.9 (58.8)	16.1 (61.0)	10.9 (51.6)
Average precipitation mm (inches)	115 (4.5)	100 (3.9)	95 (3.7)	37 (1.5)	18 (0.7)	9 (0.4)	7 (0.3)	8 (0.3)	18 (0.7)	55 (2.2)	86 (3.4)	113 (4.4)	661 (26)
Source: Rustenburg Local Municipality

== Demographics ==
Rustenburg population
Year	Pop.	±% p.a.
1950s	13,700	—
1960s	17,500	+2.48%
1970s	22,400	+2.50%
1980s	32,000	+3.63%
1996	311,187	+15.28%
2001	387,096	+4.46%
2005	216,900	−13.48%
2011	549,575	+16.76%
2022	562,031	+0.20%

In accordance to the 2011 South African National Census, the population of Rustenburg is According to the 2022 South African National Census, the population of Rustenburg is 562 031,[4] making it the fastest growing city in North West (it has been the most populous city in North West since 1996). From the 2001 census, The people live in 322 355 formal households, of which 72.8% have a flush or chemical toilet, and 76.4% have refuse removed by the municipality at least once a week. 91.1% of households have access to running water, and 94.5% use electricity as the main source of energy. 13.3% of Rustenburg residents stay in informal dwellings.[8] 99% of households are headed by one person.

Blacks account for 94% of the population, followed by whites at 4,9%, coloureds at 0,8% and Asians at 0,1%. 96% of the population is under the age of 65, while 4% of the population is over 65 years of age. 26.4% of city residents are unemployed. 34.7% of the unemployed are youths. 72,5% of people are working. 8% of economically active adults work in wholesale and retail sectors, 9% in financial and only 50% work in mining.

Gender	Population	%
Female	247,779	45.09
Male	301,796	54.91

Race	Population	%
Black	486,411	52.8
White	222,028	40.4
Coloured	4,862	1
Asian	4,215	1

First language	Population	%
IsiZulu	15,000	3
IsiXhosa	51,000	10
Afrikaans	53,000	10
Setswana	296,000	54
English	29,000	5
Other		

=== Religion ===
==== Christianity ====
95.5% of Rustenburg is Christian as there are many churches in the city: Holy Trinity Anglican Church, Central Baptist Church, Rustenburg Baptist Church, Diocese of Rustenburg, NG Bergsig Gemeente, NG Proteapark Gemeente and many others.

=== Islam ===
0.5% of Rustenburg is Muslim.

=== Education ===
Schools in Rustenburg include:

- Boikagong Secondary School
- Tlhabane West Primary School
- Abana primary school
- Bergsig Akademie/Academy
- Die Hoërskool Rustenburg
- HS Grenswag
- Zinniaville Secondary School
- Rustenburg Technical High School
- Grenville High School
- Rauwane Sepeng
- Fields College
- Selly Park Convent Primary School
- Selly Park Secondary School
- Geelhout Park High School
- H.F Tlou High School
- President Mangope Technical and Commercial High School
- Tlhabane Technical and Commercial High School
- Bafokeng High School
- Grenswag HS
- Lebone II College
- Rustenburg Educational College
- Kele Secondary School
- Meridian Private School
- J M Ntsime High School
- Keledi High School
- Vastrap primary
- Proteapark primary
- Deo Gloria Christian Academy
- Karlienpark Primary School
- Khayalethu Secondary School
- Bothibello Primary School
- Nur-ul-Iman Muslim School
- Itumeleng Secondary School
- Tswaidi High School
- Mmanape High School
- Motladi Kgoadi Goadi Primary School
- Bosabosele Primary School
- Nkukise Primary School
- Matale Secondary School

Higher education & further education colleges include:

- University of South Africa Rustenburg Hub (UNISA)
- Platinum College
- Rock of Springs Technical College
- Boston City Campus
- Global Tech College
- Multi-Tech College
- Keobakile Nursing Academy
- MSC Business College
- Damelin Rustenburg
- ORBIT College Rustenburg
- Centurion Akademie
- Brooklyn City College Rustenburg
- Advisor Progressive College Rustenburg

Other Tertiary Education Institutions close to Rustenburg:

- North-West University
- University of Pretoria
- University of the Witwatersrand
- Tshwane University of Technology
- University of South Africa Main Campus
- Sefako Makgatho Health Sciences University
- University of Johannesburg

== Economy ==
As the worlds leading platinum producing city Mining makes up 50% of Rustenburg's economy as there are 41 platinum mines in the area. Rustenburg has been highly dependent on mining which is responsible for more than 65% of local GDP and 50% of all direct jobs. The secondary GDP contributors are, by a considerable margin, finance (9%) and retail (8%).

=== Retail ===
There are many Shopping centers which bring in an influx of people from around Rustenburg such as Waterfall mall, Rustenburg mall, Sun Central, Greystone Crossing and Platinum square where one can go shopping and dining.

== Law and government ==
=== Government ===
Rustenburg is divided into 45 wards, managed by 72 councillors, as of 2006, there were 36 wards for political and administrative reasons, but the number changed to 45.

There are 10 regions in Rustenburg:

- North West: Boshoek, Chaneng, Phatsima, Rasimone
- Phokeng: Phokeng, Luka
- Northern: Tsitsing, Hartbeesfontein, Tantanana, Mogajane, Monakato, Maile Kopman and Tlaseng
- Eastern: Bethanie, Modikwe, Barseba,
- Central: Beestekraal, Boitekong, Freedom Park, Kanana, Pardekraal, Sunrise Park, Mabitse, Meriting, Thabaneng, Rankelenyane, Tlapa and Lekojaneng.
- Rustenburg: Rustenburg CBD, Tlhabane, Safarituine, Cashan, Azaleapark, Waterval East, Karlienpark, Geelhoutpark and Zinniaville
- Waterkloof: Waterkloof, Kroondal, Photsaneng, Nkaneng, Thekwane and Entabeni
- South East: Buffelspoort, Marikana
- Southern: Olifantsnek Dam, Molote and Mathopestad.

=== Crime ===
Crime is a serious issue in Rustenburg, with a number of crimes being reported on an increase, particularly contact crimes.

Murders in Rustenburg increased in 2022 by 20.3% leading to a number of cases reported in one period, The city has the highest levels of property-related crimes (burglaries and robberies). Illegal mining is a rapidly increasing occurrence contributing to homicides, drug and human trafficking.

Rustenburg is plagued by vandalism and theft of its municipal infrastructure, particularly, its electric infrastructure which is the most targeted by criminals, the most stolen parts are electricity cables that are a main target to metal thieves apart from electricity pins from transformers and mini substations, poles, wires and other components from pylons, traffic lights and streetlights leading to transient blackouts, municipal budget constraints, hindering of security and safety for residents living in each ward.

== Arts and culture ==
Rustenburg is a cultural hub due to its rich history, diverse communities and proximity to significant and natural attractions.

=== Tourist hub ===
The city is located on major highway routes and close to 2 major centres, making it a hub for tourist activities. Within the city are some historic churches and Mosque, including the Anglican Church (1871), the Dutch Reformed Church (1898–1903) and the Zinniaville Jamme Mosque in Zinniaville, the historic statue of the Voortrekker girl and the Rustenburg Museum. Rustenburg has much to entertain which include Golf Courses, hot Air ballooning, mountain climbing, hiking, the famous Ten Flags Theme park and much more. Rustenburg is also close to Magaliesburg which offers a number of restaurants and outdoor activities.

=== Sport ===
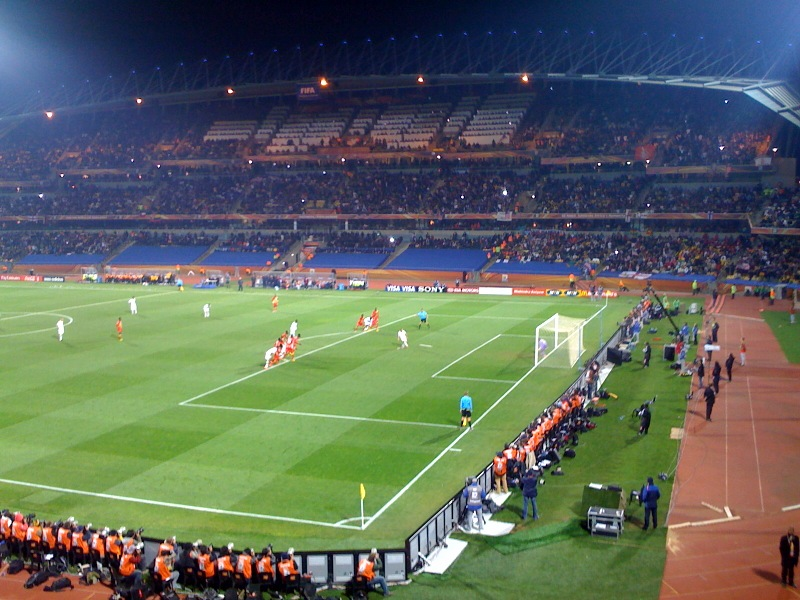
Royal Bafokeng Stadium

- Rustenburg was one of the host cities of the 2010 FIFA World Cup with the 42,000-seat Royal Bafokeng Stadium.
- Professional Football Clubs: Platinum Stars
- Rustenburg is home to another world-class stadium, Olympia Park. It hosted some of the 1995 Rugby World Cup games.
- Rustenburg Judo Club is one of the strongest clubs in South Africa, dominating the provincial team of North West Province and winning the most medals of any single club in South Africa in SA National Championships over the last 15 years.
- Rustenburg Skydiving Club – a popular skydiving facility for sports skydiving and parachuting, tandem skydiving, Accelerated Freefall (AFF) and static line courses.
- The Gary Player Country Club, located in nearby Sun City, hosts the annual Nedbank Golf Challenge, a round of the European Tour.
- Rustenburg Golf Club which is located in the heart of the city has had a major renovation since it was leased to MH Tayob in 2017. The golf club has improved its revenue tremendously by improving its Courses and adding many other amenities such as, Park run, Put Put, Indoor trampoline park, many restaurants and a 4 star event and conference centre.
- Rustenburg is home to 2 swimming clubs, Otters Rustenburg and Rustenburg Swimming Club.
- Impala Cricket Club is a Cricket sports ground located next to Olympia Park Stadion

=== Communities and battlefields ===
There are several sites of cultural and historical significance in and around Rustenburg. Some of these related to the indigenous Bafokeng, Bakgatla and Botswana tribes, whose totemic tribal traditions are of interest. There is also the German community of Kroondal that traces its origins back to 1857.

A number of Anglo-Boer and ethnic war battles took place in the area with the districts of Koster, Swartruggens and Rustenburg featuring battlefields, memorial graves and ruined forts. The area also has archaeological remains from the Iron Age and Stone Age.

=== Holiday destination ===
Sun City and the Lost City resorts located within the crater of the dormant volcano which the Pilanesberg Game Reserve lies above. The complex is set on the slopes of a valley in the Pilanesberg Mountains. Sun City is a world renown destination by Sun International and remains one of the best resorts in Southern Africa. Tourist amenities include a shopping mall, casinos, the 'Valley of the Waves' and two championship golf courses.

Protea hotel hunters rest borders the Kgaswane Nature reserve. Just 5 km from Waterfall mall. There are many amenities at this resort including, hiking, swimming, golf, horse riding, and game drives.

=== Development ===
Rustenburg is home to the two largest platinum mines in the world and the world's largest platinum refinery, PMR (Precious Metal Refiners), which processes around 70% of the world's platinum. As a result of the mining activity in this mineral-rich area, there is also an increased focus on social development.

=== Transformation of Rustenburg into a Smart City ===
Since Platinum mining is projected to decline after 2040, the Rustenburg Local Municipality formulated the Rustenburg Vision 2040 in 2014, with the goal of becoming a world-class, green, and sustainable Smart City. This included the redevelopment and rejuvenation of existing CBD areas to new commercial centres with a revised skyline incorporating a variety high-rise landmark buildings and skyscrapers as part of new space planning and maximization of land usage with the goal of creating breathing room for people to go about their lives.

=== Rustenburg Rapid Transport Project (RRT) ===
As at the end of the 2017/18 financial year, the Rustenburg Metropolitan had spent about R2.7 billion on the upgrading of old and the construction of new public transport infrastructure in and around the city. The infrastructure includes 20 km (12 mi) of bi-directional Transitway Rustenburg Rapid Transport (RRT) Bus rapid transit lanes, walk ways and 17 Sub-stations. After completion, 37 safe and clean enclosed stations on the trunk lines stations will be fully operational along 40 km (25 mi) of road using at least 100 articulated buses to transport passengers along the main corridors. On completion of Phase 1 of the 4 phase project, the RRT is projected to deliver 225 000 passenger trips a day through 13 routes, 240 bus stops and 15 BRT stations using around 268 buses. While Bus rapid transit is one of the components of the RRT system design, it will not be an exclusively BRT driven operation. The routes have been planned to integrate with bus routes servicing townships, suburbs and outlying village areas as well as long-distance bus services, which will work in unison to move people around the city and region.

== Infrastructure ==
=== Transport ===
==== Airports ====
Rustenburg Airfield (FARG), situated in the middle part of the city, is the Rustenburg Local Municipality Airfield, licensed according to Civil Aviation Authority standards. Rustenburg SkyDiving Club operates every weekend year round from the airfield. It currently has a 1225m long and 15m wide runway and serves small planes for skydiving and parachuting. As part of Rustenburg's Aerodrome Master Plan, the Airfield will receive an upgrade.

Pilanesberg International Airport (NTY), located at 50 km (31 mi) to the north of Rustenburg, is an airport serving Sun City in the North West Province of South Africa. It is located close to the Pilanesberg National Park and mainly serves tourists visiting the Sun City resort. It has a 2750m long and 30m wide runway and handles about 8000 passengers per year.

The other nearest international airport to Rustenburg situated 140 km (87 mi) south-easterly is the O. R. Tambo International Airport which is located to the east of Johannesburg. Currently, international travelers to Rustenburg come predominantly via the O.R. Tambo International Airport.

==== Rail ====
Two interprovincial rail lines traverse Rustenburg. One is in the middle part of Rustenburg connecting Rustenburg eastwards to Brits and northwards to Thabazimbi, the other rail line runs through the eastern part of Rustenburg connecting it south-easterly to Krugersdorp and south-westerly to Koster. There is a possibility of upgrading the existing Rustenburg Railway network to better cater to passengers as part of the city's revitalization. Previously, the railway lines served long-distance passengers, but are now only used for transporting platinum and chrome concentrates to smelters.

==== Bus and Taxi Transit ====
The Rustenburg Rapid Transport (RRT) Bus rapid transit network will incorporate 40 km (25 mi) (half bi-directional) transport networks, walk ways and 17 sub-stations with and over 260 buses. New routes opened as of November 2025 with new service schedules, even weekend service for route C02.

Minibus Taxis form as part of Rustenburg's public transportation, with many operating under the Yarona network.

==== Road ====
The N4 toll road, also known as the Platinum Highway, connects Rustenburg to Swartruggens, Zeerust and the Skilpadshek border with Botswana in the west and to Brits, Hartbeespoort and Pretoria in the east. The R104 road, parallel to the N4, also connects Rustenburg to Hartbeespoort and Pretoria in the east. The R24 road connects Rustenburg to Krugersdorp and Johannesburg in the south-east. The R30 road connects Olifantsnek (just south of Rustenburg) with Ventersdorp, Klerksdorp, Welkom and Bloemfontein in the south. The R52 road connects Rustenburg with Koster and Lichtenburg in the south-west. The R510 road connects Rustenburg with Thabazimbi and Lephalale in the north-east. The R565 road connects Rustenburg with Sun City in the north.

==== Media ====
Rustenburg has 5 radio stations operating in or distributing to the area such as YOU FM, Radio Mafisa, Rusty FM, Motsitle FM and Bojanala FM.

Rustenburg is the headquarters of 3 prominent news outlets:

- Rustenburg Herald
- Platinum Weekly
- Naledi News

== International relations ==
Rustenburg is twinned with:

- Marsberg, Germany

== Notable people ==
Famous people with roots in Rustenburg include:

- Rory Alec – Christian broadcaster
- Johan Botha – opera singer
- Pik Botha – politician and foreign minister (1977–1994)
- Bettie Cilliers-Barnard – painter
- John Cranko – ballet choreographer
- Koos du Plessis – singer-songwriter
- Frik du Preez – rugby union player
- John Smit – Springbok rugby captain
- Andre Stander – bank robber
- Esta TerBlanche – actress
- Sunette Viljoen – javelin thrower
- Denise Zimba – television presenter (V Entertainment)
- Renske Stoltz – netball player (for South Africa since 2015)
- Dwaine Pretorius – cricket player (for South Africa since 2016)
- Gerhard Mostert – former Springbok player
