= Olifantsnek Dam =

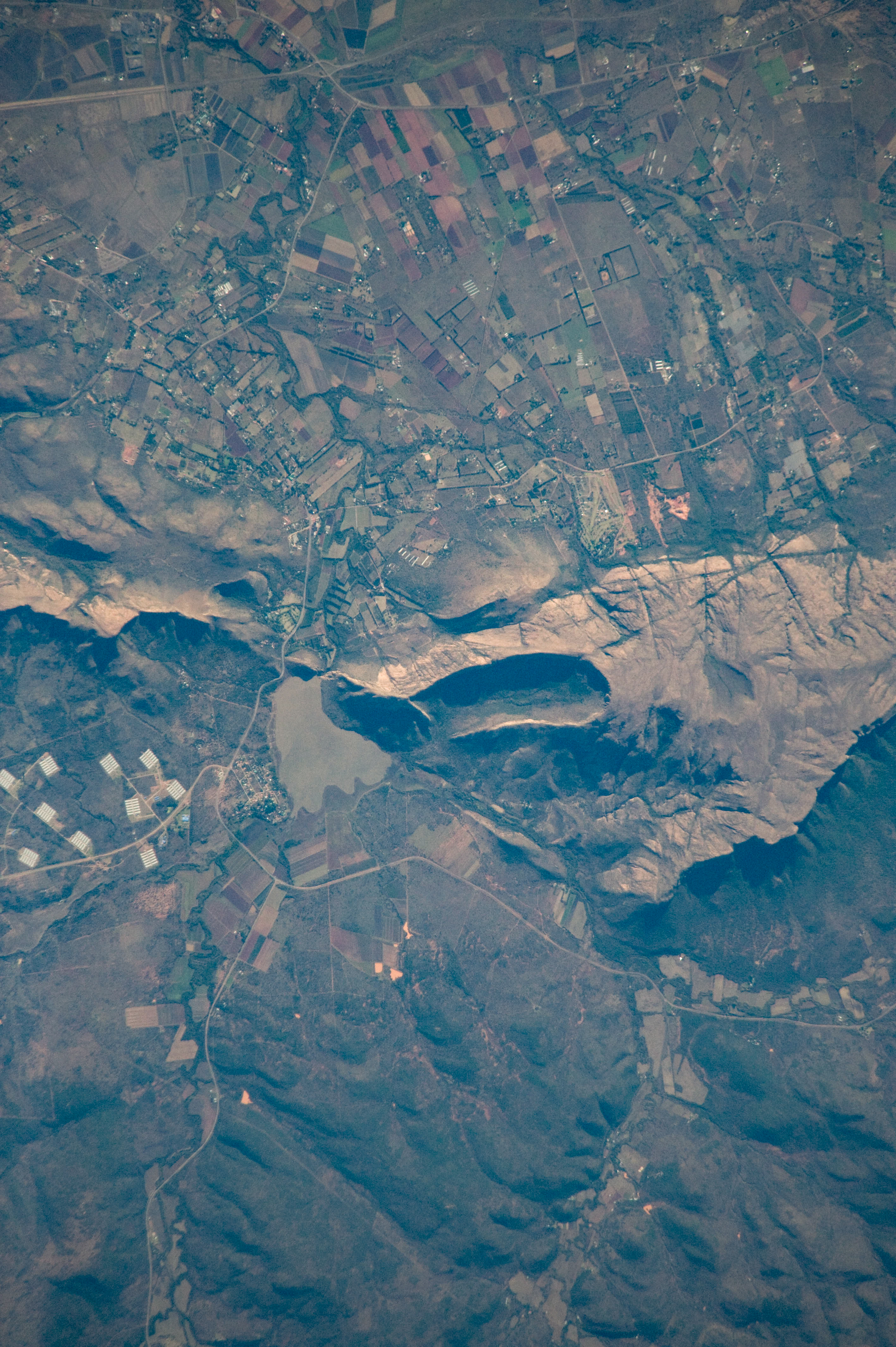
- Aerial view of Olifantsnek Dam taken during ISS Expedition 19
- Interactive map of Olifantsnek Dam
- Official name: Olifantsnek Dam
- Country: South Africa
- Location: Near Rustenburg, North West
- Coordinates: 25°47′03″S 27°15′36″E
- Purpose: Irrigation
- Opening date: 1929
- Owner: Department of Water Affairs

Dam and spillways
- Type of dam: Arch dam
- Impounds: Hex River
- Height: 30 m
- Length: 129 m

Reservoir
- Creates: Olifantsnek Dam Reservoir
- Total capacity: 14 200 000 m^{3}
- Catchment area: 492 km^{2}
- Surface area: 272 ha

Olifantsnek Dam, is an arch type dam located on the Hex River, near Rustenburg, North West, South Africa. It was established in 1929. The dam has a capacity of 14,200,000 cubic metres (500,000,000 cu ft) and a surface area of 272 hectares (670 acres), the wall is 30 metres (98 ft), and has a length of 129 metres (423 ft). The dam serves mainly for irrigation purposes and its hazard potential has been ranked high (3).

== See also ==
- List of reservoirs and dams in South Africa
