= Luis Navarro (professor) =

Spanish university professor and cultural promoter

- Born: Lluís Navarro i Miralles; 1934; Larache, Morocco
- Died: 10 March 2023 (aged 88); Tarragona, Spain
- Citizenship: Spanish
- Occupations: University professor; Cultural promoter; Writer
- Known for: Director of the Caixa de Tarragona Newspaper Library

Luis Navarro Miralles (1934 – 10 March 2023) was a Spanish university professor, writer, and cultural promoter. Throughout his life, Navarro wrote several books about numerous subjects, such as history, demographics, agriculture, democracy, and religion, mainly focused on Catalonia.

== Early life and education ==
Luis Navarro was born in 1934 in Larache, Morocco, as the son of emigrants to the Spanish protectorate in Morocco. After completing primary and secondary school at the Marist Brothers college of Tarragona, he studied law and teaching in 1956–59, and then geography and history in 1963–67. He completed his studies at the University of Barcelona, from where he obtained his doctorate in 1972 with a doctoral thesis on the Hispano–Moroccan War.

== Academic career ==
In 1971, Navarro joined the teaching team of the delegation of the Faculty of Arts of the University of Rovira i Virgili (URV), where he was a professor of Modern History for many years. Between 1971 and 1974, he taught simultaneously at the URV and the University of Barcelona. During his career, he organized several congresses and seminars and promoted the creation of the newspaper archive library of the Caixa de Tarragona, of which he was a director for many years. He retired in 2004, aged 70, but four years later, on 17 December 2008, he gave the last master class at the Plaça Imperial Tàrraco building.

== Writing career ==
Throughout his life, Navarro wrote several books about numerous subjects, such as history, demographics, agriculture, democracy, and religion, mainly focused in Catalonia. In 1998, Navarro published a book titled L'aigua a la història de Tarragona ("L'aigua to the history of Tarragona").

In 2005, Navarro, together with Jordi Blay Boqué, published Guia de Bonastre, and in the same year, he coordinated with Francesc Olivé the fourth volume of Valls i la seva història ("Valls and its history").

== Death ==
Navarro died in Tarragona on 10 March 2023, at the age of 88, and his farewell ceremony was held on the following day at the Tarragona Funeral Home.
