= Cannabis in Malawi =

Malawian cannabis, particularly the strain known as Malawi Gold, is internationally renowned as one of the finest sativa strains from Africa. According to a World Bank report it is among "the best and finest" marijuana strains in the world, generally regarded as one of the most potent psychoactive pure African sativas. The popularity of this variety has led to such a profound increase in marijuana tourism and economic profit in Malawi that Malawi Gold is listed as one of the three "Big C's" in Malawian exports: chambo (Tilapia fish), chombe (tea), and chamba (cannabis).

In February 2020, Malawi's parliament legalized the cultivation and processing of cannabis for industrial and medicinal uses, but did not decriminalize recreational use in the country.

== Cultivation ==
Malawi is one of the largest producers of cannabis in Southern Africa. It is mainly cultivated in remote parts of the central and northern regions. In the north, it can be found growing in Mzimba District's Likwawa hills, and in Nkhotakota District. Nkhotakota District is known for producing the best marijuana, particularly near the banks of the Lupache river. It can also be found at smaller quantities in the districts of Ntchisi, Kasungu, Ntcheu and Dedza. Most growers cultivate small, out of the way fields up on remote mountain hills, hidden in bushes, or intercropped with other field crops. There are a few commercial farmers. The United Nations Development Assistance Framework report that in the late 1990s, estimated that up to 156,000 hectares (385,000 acres) in the country were devoted to the cultivation of marijuana.

Women are largely involved in cultivation of chamba, while men are mainly involved in marketing it. In Malawi, the marijuana buds are cured after being tightly bound in banana or maize leaves. They are sold in units called 'cobs' locally known as 'mfani' or "bola" in Chichewa.

== International market ==
Its quality has led it to out-perform marijuana grown in other countries in terms of sales in each market it is introduced in. International organized groups employ Malawians to purchase and produce cannabis from local producers. It mainly crosses Malawi borders through Mozambique and Zimbabwe, to South Africa. For Malawi and South Africa, it has led to an increase in marijuana tourism from holiday makers seeking cannabis. More recently Malawian cannabis has now flooded the marijuana markets in Kenya, Tanzania, and many other locales. In Kenya, one cob of pure, smokable marijuana is worth US$1.97. About US$0.32 is paid to the original farmer. It even was available in the Netherlands. Although Malawi Gold is illegally exported out of the country for its recreational use, Malawi is yet to legalize cultivation for recreational use.

=== Critical acclaim ===
For many marijuana smokers, the strain Malawi Gold has reached almost a cult status. There are websites and blogs which have been dedicated to the praise of chamba. Legends and myths have developed surrounding the potency of the drug, as an example, there is a popular story about visitors that came to Malawi, tried chamba, and lost the will to return to their country of origin. Jamaican reggae musician Bob Marley once commented to the press that he liked its effects so much because it made him feel "invisible"

=== Marijuana tourism ===
Malawi gains a significant amount of its tourism from the marijuana trade. Albeit illegal, the plant grows in the wild in many areas, which has made it hard to control. In the lake areas, many tourists purchase the drug and smoke it in the privacy of their hotel rooms or homes. Tourists in Malawi known to shop for chamba in the Nkhotakota District which has a reputation for producing the best marijuana.

== Domestic market ==
Illegal trade in chamba amounts to an estimated 0.2% of Malawi's GDP or K1.4 billion. The majority of the product is not used locally since it is primarily grown for an export market. Integration in the global market has resulted to unfair trade therefore Malawian growers are getting underpaid. Malawi farmers receive only about a fifth of the price for which it is being sold in foreign consumer markets. It does however, fetch more money than Malawis largest export, tobacco. Most growers do not sell it directly to the market themselves, but instead to national or international traffickers.

=== Medicinal usage ===
Cannabis was widely used by the entire population as an intoxicant and as medicine in treating conditions like anthrax, dysentery, fevers, malaria, or snakebites. Rastafari in Malawi now are the proponents that claim medicinal use of the chamba leaves. A research study entitled, "Patients' Perceptions of Chamba (marijuana) Use in Malawi" was conducted in Zomba Mental Hospital was published in the International Journal of the Addictions in 1998. It had it implications for the development of treatment and prevention programs for chamba users in Malawi.

=== Religious usage ===
Malawian Rastafari have been using marijuana as part of their spiritual awakening for years. The Rastafari cite religious importance in the use of the plant. In his doctoral thesis, Dr. Stewart Maganga noted that in spite of this, Rastafarians in Malawi face constant police harassment.

=== Recreational use ===
Malawians have been using cannabis for recreational use for generations. The use of cannabis is particularly popular along the lake side. Many Malawians claim that cannabis helps them to relax and concentrate. Local students use cannabis to prevent pre-exam jitters. Police raids are common, however recreational use of cannabis remains unabated. Many backpackers and overlanders are attracted to Malawi due to recreational use of inexpensive cannabis.

Malawi legalised cannabis farming for industrial and medicinal use in February 2020 hoping to take advantage of the booming global demand and move away from the reliance on tobacco as an export crop.

Below are the United Nations figures on number of cannabis seizures in Malawi from 1995 - 2000, published in the 2003 Institute for Security Studies Report:

| 1995 | 1996 | 1997 | 1998 | 1999 | 2000 | Total |
|---|---|---|---|---|---|---|
| 39,911 | 8,453 | 10,320 | 5,202 | 27,142 | 312,472 | 403,500 |

=== Campaign to legalize cannabis ===
Malawi has legalized Malawi Gold for medicinal use and industrial use after a campaign in parliament in 2015 led by Boniface Kadzamira, an independent member of parliament, made a case for the legalization of industrial hemp and other uses of marijuana. Rastafari in Malawi have gone to court to demand their right to smoke cannabis. In 2000, the government briefly explored the possible legalization of Indian hemp, despite police warnings of potential abuse by cannabis growers. This was championed in parliament by Deputy Minister of Agriculture Joe Manduwa who argued that the plant could be a valuable alternative to tobacco. The idea was supported by member of parliament and medical doctor, Hetherwick Ntaba who argued that it is non-addictive.

== In pop culture ==
=== Bob Marley ===
When reggae musician Bob Marley visited Zimbabwe during his Zimbabwe Independence Tour concert in 1980, he smoked Malawi Gold in Harare with his art director, Neville Garrick. It was wrapped in a banana leaf and had a lasting effect on him. He liked it so much that he commented to reporters that Malawi Gold made him "feel invisible".

=== Fresh Air Fiend (book) ===
Malawi cannabis was mentioned in the New York Times Notable list book, Fresh air Fiend: Travel Writing 1985–2000 by American travel writer and author Paul Theroux. Theroux writes about the usage of Malawi Gold by Peace Corps volunteers and hippies when he lived in Malawi. He notes that hippies, backpackers and Peace Corps volunteers had the same experience visiting Malawi and smoking marijuana like the hippies who went on the Hippie trail in Asia.

=== Marley Natural ===
In 2021 the weed brand Marley Natural launched a limited edition sativa edition inspired by Malawi Gold, called "Gold". Artist and photographer Neville Garrick, who was also Bob Marley's art director, designed the bottle with an image of African mask, banana leaves, and the Malawi flag. He had first tried Malawi gold with Bob Marley on his trip to Zimbabwe where it was given to them by Zimbabwean soldiers.

=== Mike Tyson ===
Former heavy weight champion boxing champion Mike Tyson was asked to be the Malawian Cannabis Ambassador in 2021 to help promote Malawian marijuana sales.

=== Strain Hunters Malawi Expedition (2010) ===
On an episode of strain hunters international, "Strain Hunters Malawi Expedition" (2010) by Green House Seed Company from Netherlands featured an episode on finding the source of Malawi Gold, which is popular in Netherlands, their country of origin. It features Franco Loja, Arjan Roskam, Simon and Dust.

== See also ==
- Cannabis sativa
- Medical cannabis
