= De-Wet Nagel =

South African actor, musician and composer

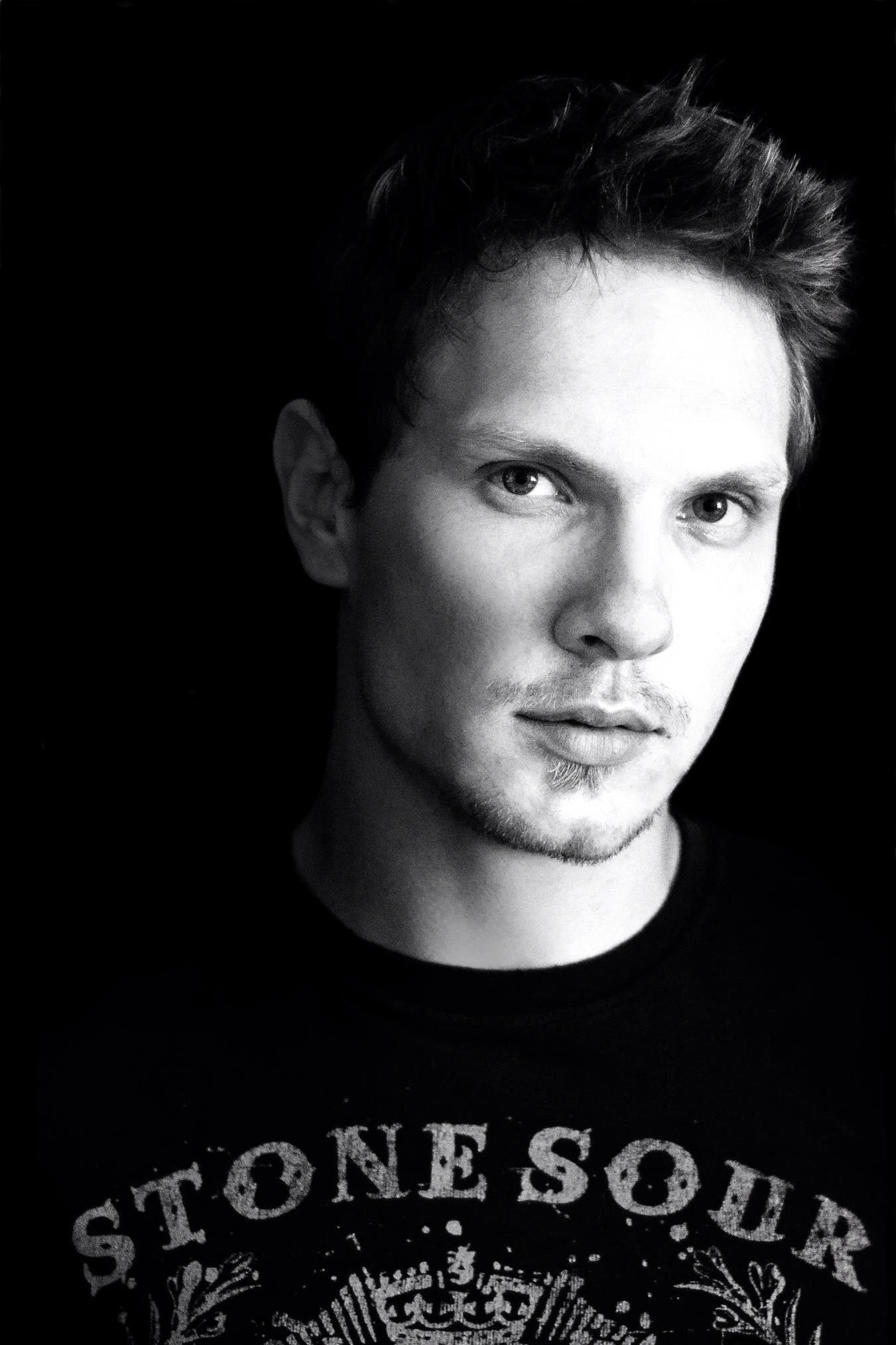
- Born: 15 June 1985 (age 41); Windhoek, Namibia
- Occupations: Actor, composer, musician
- Years active: 2011–present

De-Wet Nagel (born 15 June 1985) is a South African actor, musician and composer.

== Early life ==
De-Wet Nagel was born in Windhoek, Namibia.

== Career ==
=== Music ===
Nagel's music career started after immigrating to South Africa in 1999, when he was still in school. He was a session musician in various bands and projects and started writing and teaching music. He has performed and worked with local and international bands, including the Jesse Jordan Band, Akkedis, Heather Waters, Prime Circle, Chris Chameleon's boo! and Fokofpolisiekar.

In 2005, he started the music school Ultimate Drummers, which offers drum-kit and electric guitar lessons to high school students in affiliation with Trinity College London who sends examiners down to South Africa on a yearly basis to provide certificate exams to affiliated schools.

=== Composition ===
Heartbeat

In 2012, Nagel composed and performed the soundtrack to the short film Heartbeat. Instruments performed include drum-kit, guitar, piano, bass guitar and additional arrangements for strings.

Track listing for Heartbeat OST

No.	Title	Length
1.	"You Talk About" (Carla Yonker and De-Wet Nagel, Performed by De-Wet Nagel)	3:49
2.	"In Love And War" (De-Wet Nagel)	3:11
3.	"Competing Interns – theme" (De-Wet Nagel and Meryl van Noie)	2:49
4.	"Secrets Out – theme" (De-Wet Nagel and Meryl van Noie)	1:55
5.	"Breaking the Rules – theme" (De-Wet Nagel and Meryl van Noie)	3:49
6.	"Make Believe" (Brigitte Stanford and Gilmour Gordon with additional arrangements by De-Wet Nagel and Wikus du Rand)	4:05
7.	"Believe" (De-Wet Nagel)	3:34
8.	"Dusty Road" (Meryl van Noie, performed by Meryl van Noie and De-Wet Nagel)	3:36

My Darkest Diary

My Darkest Diary is a conceptual music project created by De-Wet Nagel with the aim to connect fans and musicians with charity and using music to better society.

"Every musician that manages to get airplay on the radio has a voice and it is in My Darkest Diary that they can use that voice to instill positive change in the world. The idea is for each musician or band to create a single track within My Darkest Diary to advocate a particular charity, organization or institution that they champion in changing our world and for fans to unite with their favorite artists in supporting that charity".

The single 'This World Has Lost Its mind' is De-Wet's protest against drugs. The single cover is a photo taken by Miss Hepburn Photography where De-Wet used actual water based ink in his eyes to reflect his stance on the severity in which recreational drug use should be viewed. Immediately after the photo shoot De-Wet started coughing ink and blood and ink started leaking out of his nose due to the fact that it had started running through his sinuses after seeping into his tear ducts.

Track listing for My Darkest Diary

No.	Title	Length
1.	"This World Has Lost Its Mind" (De-Wet Nagel)	4:11

=== Acting ===
His acting career started in 2010, when he started acting in short films for film students. After joining an extras agency, he appeared in feature films, including Lost Boys: The Thirst, where appeared as a featured vampire.

In 2012, after being optioned for the role of Jack in the short film Heartbeat, Nagel approached the director Jozua Judah with the aim to compose an original soundtrack for the film. After Nagel enlisted the help of Meryl Van Noie, they created the soundtrack.

In 2013, Nagel made his debut on the theatre stage portraying the character Andrew in the play February 14th, at the Artscape Theatre Centre in Cape Town Critics hailed his performance as "sensational" stating that "he is definitely one actor to look out for.

In 2015 De-Wet Nagel will helm the role of Frans du Toit (the ripper rapist) in the real life documentary based on the story of Alison Botha who was raped, stabbed 37 times and had her throat slit before being left for dead on the outskirts of Port Elizabeth, an event she survived and later wrote about in the book "I Have Life" Alison is currently in pre-production.

In 2017, Nagel had an uncredited role as a Taheen Technician in The Dark Tower.

== Filmography ==
Film

Year	Title	Role	Note
2010	Lost Boys: The Thirst	Rave Vampire	Actor
2012	Safe House	Innocent Bystander	Actor
2013	Heartbeat	Musical Director	Soundtrack Composer
2013	Hoe Duur Was de Suiker (The Price of Sugar)	Rich merchant	Actor
2013	Perplexity (short film)	Richard	Actor
2015	Alison (Documentary)	Frans du Toit	Actor

Television

Year	Title	Season	Episode	Role	Note
2013	Hectic nine-9			Himself	Musician/Actor
