= Erminia Dell'Oro =

- Born: 4 April 1938 (age 88); Asmara, Italian East Africa
- Occupation: Writer

Erminia Dell'Oro (born 4 April 1938) is an Italian writer and novelist born in the Italian Eritrea.

== Career ==
Dell'Oro is of Italian ascendancy. She was born on 4 April 1938 in Asmara, the city where she spent the first twenty years. of her life. Her paternal grandfather moved from Lecco to Eritrea in 1886, following the colonial adventures of Italians at that time and supported by the Italian government. Her childhood and adolescence was experienced in Eritrea where she grew up under colonial occupation along with her family. At age twenty, Dell'Oro left Eritrea for Milan, where she planned to become a journalist, but worked mainly as a bookseller. Her family and the influences of living under colonialism encouraged her to publish her first autobiographical novel, Asmara Addio in 1988.

Dell'Oro's works targets adults, children and teenagers. Her books addresses, with different narrative forms, the pleasures and disadvantages of living under colonialism with mixed Italian and African cultures on a day-to-day basis. Her adult novels such as Asmara Addio shed light on the dual perspective of the colonial life seen with the eyes of colonists. Recurring issues in her works include racial, cultural and religious coexistence, apartheid, immigration and integration themes.

== Works ==
- Asmara Addio (1988)
- L'Abbandono: Una Storia Eritrea (1991)
- Matteo e i Dinosauri (1993)
- Il Fiore di Merara (1994)
- La Pianta Magica (1995)
- Mamme al Vento
