= Victoria Falls Stock Exchange =

Stock exchange in Victoria Falls, Zimbabwe

- Type: Stock exchange
- Location: Victoria Falls, Zimbabwe
- Founded: 2020
- Key people: Caroline Sandura (Board Chairperson); Justin Bgoni (CEO)
- Currency: United States dollar
- No. of listings: 15
- Indices: Allshare Index (VFEX-ASI)
- Website: vfex.exchange

The Victoria Falls Stock Exchange (VFEX) is a small stock exchange headquartered in Victoria Falls, Zimbabwe. It was established in 2020, as a subsidiary of the Zimbabwe Stock Exchange (ZSE) to operate in the Victoria Falls special economic zone. The VFEX's trading currency of the U.S. Dollar allows the exchange to shield investors from exchange control risk.

== Trading times ==
The VFEX operates with the following trading times:

- Pre-open: 09:00 to 09:30
- Open: 09:30 to 13:00
- Post-close: 13:00 to 14:30

These times excludes weekends and public holidays.

== See also ==
- Economy of Zimbabwe
- List of stock exchanges
- List of African stock exchanges
