= Annie Chikhwaza =

Annie Chikhwaza (born 26 May 1944, in Burgwerd) is a Dutch missionary known as a 'Mother of Malawi' for her work with orphans in Africa through Kondanani Children's Village, an NGO, which has been called "a five star orphanage" and "a centre of excellence" in a Channel 4 documentary. Many of the orphans are survivors of HIV/AIDS and Chikhwaza has built a village at Bvumbwe in Thyolo District of Malawi which includes an infant care facility, children's homes, nursery school, primary school and farm.

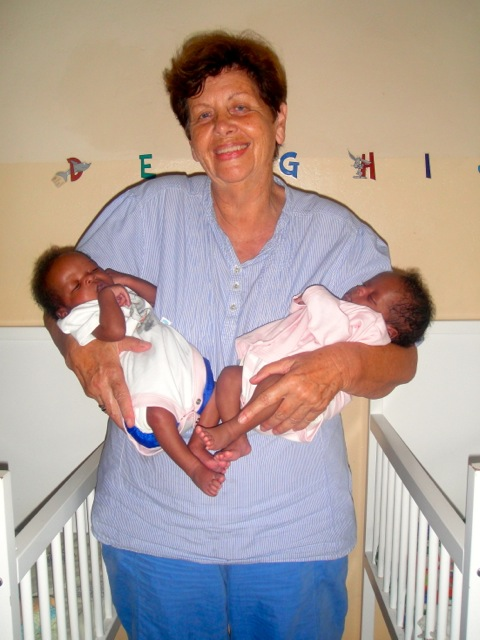
The founder of Kondanani Children's Village in Malawi, Annie Chikhwaza with two of the orphaned children in her care.

== Early life and career ==
Born Antje Saakje Terpstra in Friesland in the Netherlands, the eldest daughter of a family of five children, she was trained as a psychiatric nurse in the Netherlands before moving to England in 1965 where she married David William Robson in March 1966. She and her husband moved to South Africa the same year and they had four children before they divorced in 1982. In 1980 she started Rhema Alexandra, an organisation aimed at helping to alleviate poverty in what was a volatile township, in the Johannesburg area. In 1993 she married Lewis Chikhwaza, a Malawian pastor and moved to Bvumbwe near Blantyre where she continued to help the poor and started a nursery school. In 1996 she sustained a brutal attack on her life which made headlines in the Malawian media. Malawi News Online reported: "The Dutch woman married to Pastor Lewis Chikhwaza of the Bible Faith Ministries of Blantyre sustained multiple injuries when a horde of angry villagers descended on her executing instant justice." Though she nearly died, Chikhwaza survived the attack and went back to South Africa to recuperate but returned to Malawi 18 months later. Standing with an HIV/AIDS-infected baby, she felt the call to start an orphanage, she and Lewis founded Kondandani Children's Village in 1998.

Annie Chikhwaza's life story is captured in the biography Mother of Malawi – published worldwide by Lion Hudson.

== Kondanani Children's Village ==
Cross International describes Kondanani as "a Christ-centered orphanage that cares for children from birth until they are fully grown, educated and ready to launch out on their own. Most of the children are AIDS orphans" The Christian relief and development organization also presents a video of the children of Kondanani singing the orphanage anthem, 'Children of Destiny'. Christian television network, GOD TV supports Kondanani and describes its founder: "Annie Chikhwaza is a dedicated caregiver who at a time when other orphanages would not admit babies because of the cost, embarked on admitting these little ones so that they would not be left to die. Now with well over 100 orphans in her care it is heart-rending to see how these children are blossoming and developing skills which will give them brighter future." The orphanage is financed by family trusts, charities such as Cross International and GOD TV and has received local support from The Press Trust in Malawi.

Journalist Jacques Peretti describes his visit to Kondanani in The Guardian: "I am directed round the immaculate dormitories, play areas, dining hall and creche, walking down pristine paths bordered with stones and flowers... It is all absolutely and undeniably fantastic. It looks like a 19th-century public school in a British colony in Africa - which is pretty much what it is. Everywhere across Malawi, children sit quietly by the roadside, waiting for life to do something terrible to them. Here, they run up to you speaking perfect English, each more impossibly charming, clever, funny and take-home-able than the last."

== Media attention ==
Chikhwaza has featured on television internationally. The Dutch TV station, Evangelische Omroep (EO) broadcast a documentary on her life, Annie Terpstra, mem in Malawi, and she was featured in an episode of The Helping Dutchman. GOD TV aired a series of weekly interviews with her on In Depth with David Aldous and the work of Kondanani has featured on Behind the Screens with Rory & Wendy Alec.

When American celebrity Madonna went to Malawi to adopt a baby in 2008, Kondanani became the target of global media attention. Her adoption of a baby girl from the orphanage was initially rejected by a Malawian Court, causing controversy and Britain's Channel 4 focused on Kondanani in a series entitled Madonna and Mercy: What Really Happened.

Dan McDougall of the Sunday Times visited Kondanani in 2011 and interviewed Chikhwaza as part of an investigation into good and bad aid to Africa. His article 'Ambition impossible' was critical of Madonna's adoption of Mercy and the termination of her project to build a school in the country, while acknowledging that "there are successful orphanages in Malawi" and referring to "Annie Chikhwaza, who operates the highly regarded Kondanani Children’s Village orphanage".

In a video accompanying his Sunday Times report, McDougall also observes: "With fundraising comes accountability, this raises the concerns of NGO workers on the ground, including Annie Chikhwaza, who runs a wonderful orphanage called Kondanani, which in fact was an inspiration for Madonna. Annie told me that she was very concerned about celebrities starting charities and then spreading themselves very thin and therefore losing control. Annie’s orphanage is successful because she controls it with a rod of iron, every single penny is accounted for. That's why it is a successful charity because in Africa you have to keep a tight watch on things... Donors who give money need to know exactly what has happened to it."

== Biography and speaking engagements ==
Chikhwaza has travelled to the USA, UK, the Netherlands, Australia and South Africa as a guest speaker. She has spoken in Laguna Beach, CA, and in April 2013 she visited the UK where she spoke in several churches as part of her 'Mother of Malawi' Book Tour. In 2014 she visited Perth, Melbourne and Brisbane and was interviewed by several Australian radio stations including ABC; and Sight Magazine.

== Adoptions ==
Chikhwaza has been criticised for undertaking international adoptions including that of Madonna's adoption of Mercy James from the orphanage. However she believes that no child should be denied being brought up in a home with their own parents if that option exists, even if it is an international adoption. In addition to caring for 181 children at Kondanani Chikhwaza she has arranged several adoptions mainly from her homeland, working through the Malawian Courts and Ministry of Social Welfare and a Dutch Adoption Agency. Dutch TV have covered the story of Jan en Esther Ekkel-Vorstenbosch who went to Kondanani in 2008 to adopt a Malawian boy in their series 'A Good Start'.
