= White Africans of European ancestry =

African citizens and residents born in or with ancestors from Europe

White Africans of European ancestry refers to citizens or residents in Africa who can trace full or partial ancestry to Europe. They are distinguished from Arabs, Berbers, and Copts in North Africa, who are sometimes identified as 'White' in U.S. Law, but not European. In 1989, there were an estimated 4.6 million White people with European ancestry on the African continent.

Most are of Anglo-Celtic, Dutch, French, German, and Portuguese origin. To a lesser extent, there are also those who descended from Belgians, Greeks, Italians, Scandinavians, and Spaniards. The majority once lived along the Mediterranean coast or in Southern Africa.

The earliest permanent European communities in Africa during the Age of Discovery were formed at the Cape of Good Hope; Luanda, Angola; São Tomé Island; and Santiago, Cape Verde through the introduction of Portuguese and Dutch traders or military personnel. Other groups of White settlers arrived in newly established French, German, Belgian, and British settlements in Africa over the course of the nineteenth and early twentieth centuries. Before regional decolonisation, whites of European ancestry may have numbered up to 6 million persons at their peak and were represented in every part of the continent.

An exodus of colonists accompanied independence in most African nations. Over half the Portuguese Mozambican population, which numbered about 200,000 in 1975, departed en masse because of discriminatory economic policies directed against them. In Zimbabwe, recent white exodus was spurred by an aggressive land reform programme introduced by late President Robert Mugabe in 2000 and the parallel collapse of that country's economy. In Burundi, the local White population was blatantly expelled via a decree issued by the post-colonial government upon independence.

The African country with the largest population of European descendants both numerically and proportionally is South Africa, where White South Africans number 4,504,252 people, making up 7.3% of South Africa's population, according to the 2022 South African census. Smaller European-descended populations exist in Namibia, Angola, Madagascar, Morocco, Kenya, Senegal, Tunisia, Zambia, Zimbabwe and elsewhere. Although white minorities no longer hold exclusive political power, some continued to retain key positions in industry and commercial agriculture in several African countries after the introduction of majority rule.

== Overview ==
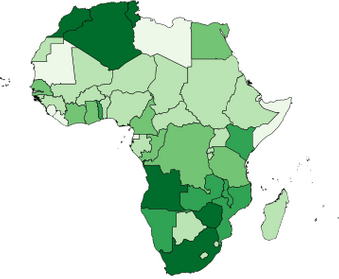
In 1962: Geographic distribution of Europeans and their descendants on the African continent. Under 1,000 Over 1,000 Over 10,000 Over 50,000 Over 100,000

During the Colonisation of Africa, European settlement patterns generally favoured territories with a substantial amount of land at least 910 metres (3,000 ft) above sea level, an annual rainfall of over 510 millimetres (20 in) but not exceeding 1,020 millimetres (40 in), and relative freedom from the Tsetse fly. In contrast to Western and Central Africa, the milder, drier climates of Northern, Eastern, and Southern Africa thus attracted substantial numbers of permanent European immigrants. A modest annual rainfall of under 1020 mm was considered especially suitable for the temperate farming activities to which many were accustomed. Therefore, the first parts of Africa to be populated by Europeans were located at the northern and southern extremities of the continent; between these two extremes, disease and the tropical climate precluded most permanent European settlement until the late nineteenth century. The discovery of valuable resources in Africa's interior and the introduction of quinine as a cure for malaria altered this longstanding trend, and a new wave of European colonists arrived on the continent between 1890 and 1918.

Most European colonists granted land in African colonies cultivated cereal crops or raised cattle, which were far more popular among the immigrants rather than managing the tropical plantations aimed at producing export-oriented crops such as rubber and palm oil. A direct consequence of this preference was that the territories with a rainfall exceeding 1020 mm developed strong plantation-based economies but produced almost no food beyond what was cultivated by small-scale indigenous producers; drier territories with large white farming communities became more self-sufficient in food production. The latter often resulted in sharp friction between European colonists and black African tribes as they competed for land. By 1960, at least seven British, French, and Belgian colonies—in addition to the Union of South Africa—had passed legislation reserving a fixed percentage of land for white ownership. This allowed colonists to legitimise their land seizures and began a process that had the ultimate consequence of commodifying land in colonial Africa. Land distribution thus emerged as an extremely contentious issue in those territories with large numbers of permanent European colonists. During the 1950s, black Africans owned about 13.7% of the land in South Africa and a little under 33% of the land in Southern Rhodesia. An inevitable trend of this factor, exacerbated by high rates of population growth, was that large numbers of black farmers as well as their livestock began to be concentrated in increasingly overcrowded areas.

Before 1914, colonial governments encouraged European settlement on a grand scale, based on the assumption that this was a prerequisite to long-term development and economic growth. The concept lost popularity when it became clear that multinational corporations financed by overseas capital, coupled with cheap African labour, were far more productive and efficient at building export-oriented economies for the benefit of the metropolitan powers. During the Great Depression, locally owned, small-scale businesses managed by individual whites suffered immense losses attempting to compete with large commercial enterprises and the lower costs of black labour (South Africa being the sole exception to the rule, as its white businesses and labour were heavily subsidised by the state).

Unlike other former colonies such as those in the Americas and Australia, Europeans and their descendants on the African continent never outnumbered the indigenous people; nevertheless, they found ways to consolidate power and exert a disproportionate influence on the administrative policies of their respective metropolitan countries. Some lost their sense of identification with Europe and created their own nationalist movements, namely in South Africa and Rhodesia (now known as Zimbabwe). Permanent white residents were regarded as an increasing liability by colonial administrations as they sought to dominate their adopted African homelands. They were also likely to involve the government in conflict with Africans, which required expensive military campaigns and inextricably damaged relations between the latter and the metropolitan powers. This was a common trend throughout African colonies from the late eighteenth to early twentieth centuries. In the Dutch Cape Colony for instance, governor Joachim van Plettenberg demarcated the territory's boundaries around 1778 with approval from the Xhosa chiefdoms; the following year Dutch colonists violated the border and attacked the Xhosa, sparking the bloody Xhosa Wars. Disputes between German colonists and the Matumbi and Ngoni peoples contributed significantly to the Maji Maji Rebellion of 1905–07. During the same period, Colonial Kenya's European residents were largely responsible for provoking a revolt by the Masai.

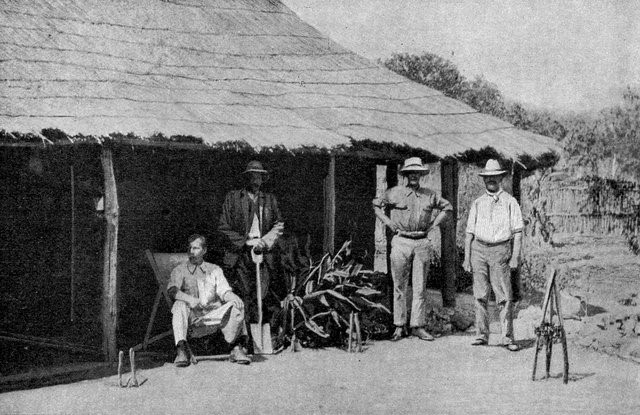
White farmers in Southern Rhodesia, early 1920s

White settlers wielded enormous influence over many colonial administrations; for example, they often occupied influential positions on elected legislatures and held most of the senior administrative posts in the civil service. Due to the relative poverty of most black Africans, whites of European ancestry also controlled the capital for development and dominated the import and export trade as well as commercial agriculture. They often represented a disproportionate percentage of the skilled workforce due to much higher educational attainment. This was heightened by the discriminatory practices of the colonial authorities, which devoted more public funding to their education and technical training. For example, in Tanganyika, the colonial authorities were estimated to have allocated up to twenty-six times more funding per year for white schools than black schools. In most of colonial Africa, local whites sought employment with foreign companies, often in technical or managerial positions, or with the public service. The exception were those colonies with large white farming populations, such as Kenya and Southern Rhodesia. The white residents there were likelier to form their own business communities and invest heavily in the economies of their adopted homelands.

The advent of global decolonisation ushered in a radical change of perspectives towards European settlement in Africa. Metropolitan governments began to place more emphasis on their relations with the indigenous peoples rather than the progressively independent colonist populations. In direct opposition to the growing tide of African nationalism, whites of European descent in colonies such as Algeria began to forge new nationalist identities of their own. Attitudes towards rapid decolonisation among individual white African communities were hardened by fears of irresponsible or incompetent postcolonial governments, coupled to a parallel decline in public infrastructure, service delivery, and consequently, their own standards of living.

On some occasions the granting of independence to African states under majority rule was influenced by the desire to preempt unilateral declarations of independence or secession attempts by white nationalists. Nevertheless, Rhodesia's white minority did succeed in issuing its own declaration of independence in 1965 and later retain power up until 1979. Less successful was an attempted coup d'état by white Mozambicans in 1974, which was forcibly crushed by Portuguese troops. White rule in South Africa ended with the country's first non-racial elections in 1994.

A white flight phenomenon accompanied regional decolonisation and to a lesser extent, the termination of white minority rule in Rhodesia and South Africa. A considerable reverse exodus of former colonials returning to Western Europe occurred; because they had controlled key sectors of many African economies prior to independence, their abrupt departure often resulted in devastating economic repercussions for the emerging states. Consequently, some African governments have made a concerted attempt to retain sizable white communities in the interests of preserving their capital and much-needed technical skills.

A few colonies had no permanent white populations at all, and in such cases the European powers preferred to construct forts and trading posts rather than large settlements accordingly. Transient administrators and soldiers were posted there initially as deterrents to rival governments attempting to effectuate treaties concerning land and other resources with local African populations. Their numbers were sometimes bolstered by civilian expatriates employed as missionaries, public servants, or employees of large transnational companies with headquarters located aside the African continent. Few of these expatriates came to immigrate permanently, and typically worked in the colonies for a short period before returning to Europe. This made them less embedded in the economy and social structure, less interested in influencing local politics, and less likely to form cohesive communities than the colonist populations elsewhere.

== Demographics ==
=== Historical population ===
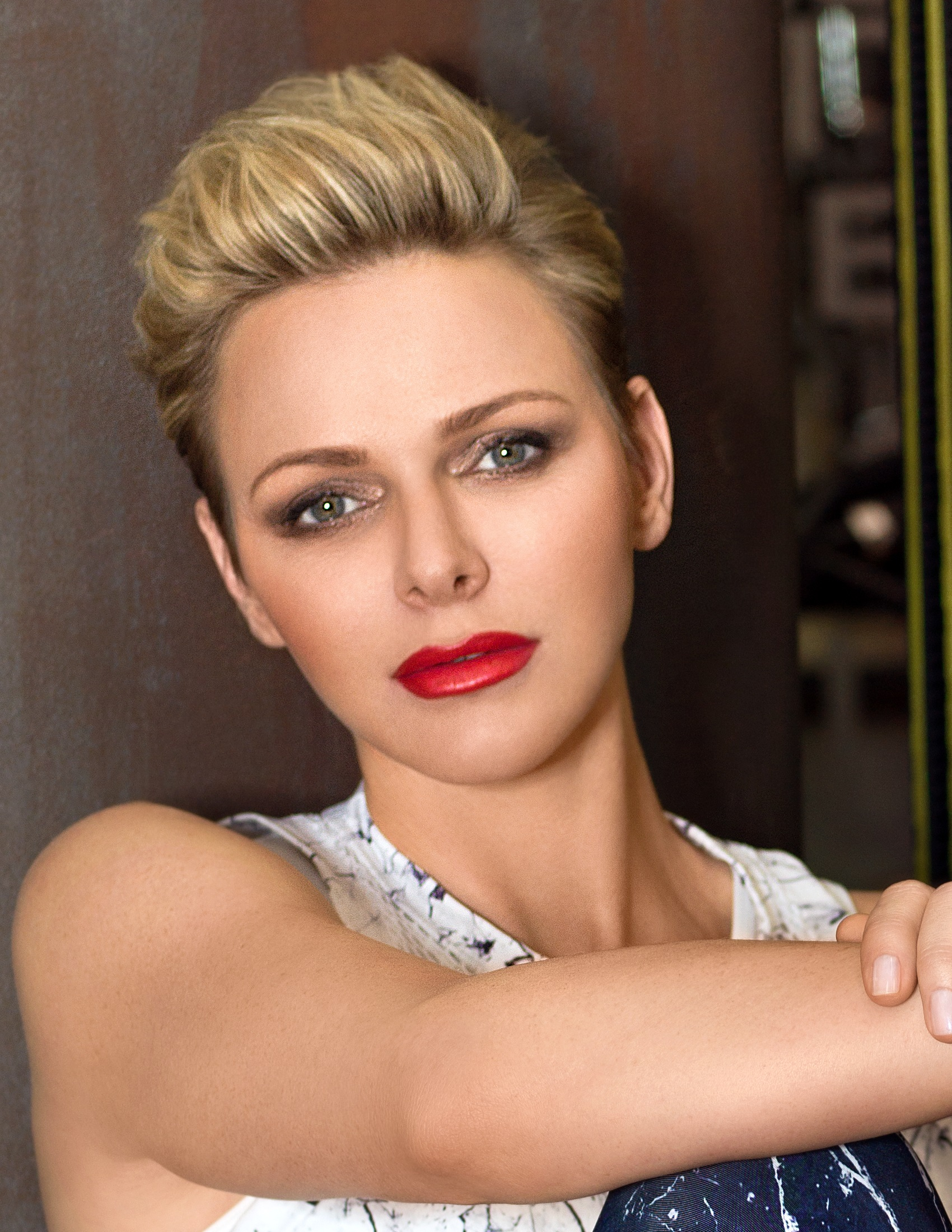
Charlene, princess consort of Monaco and former Olympic swimmer representing South Africa. Charlene was born in Bulawayo, Rhodesia (now Zimbabwe).

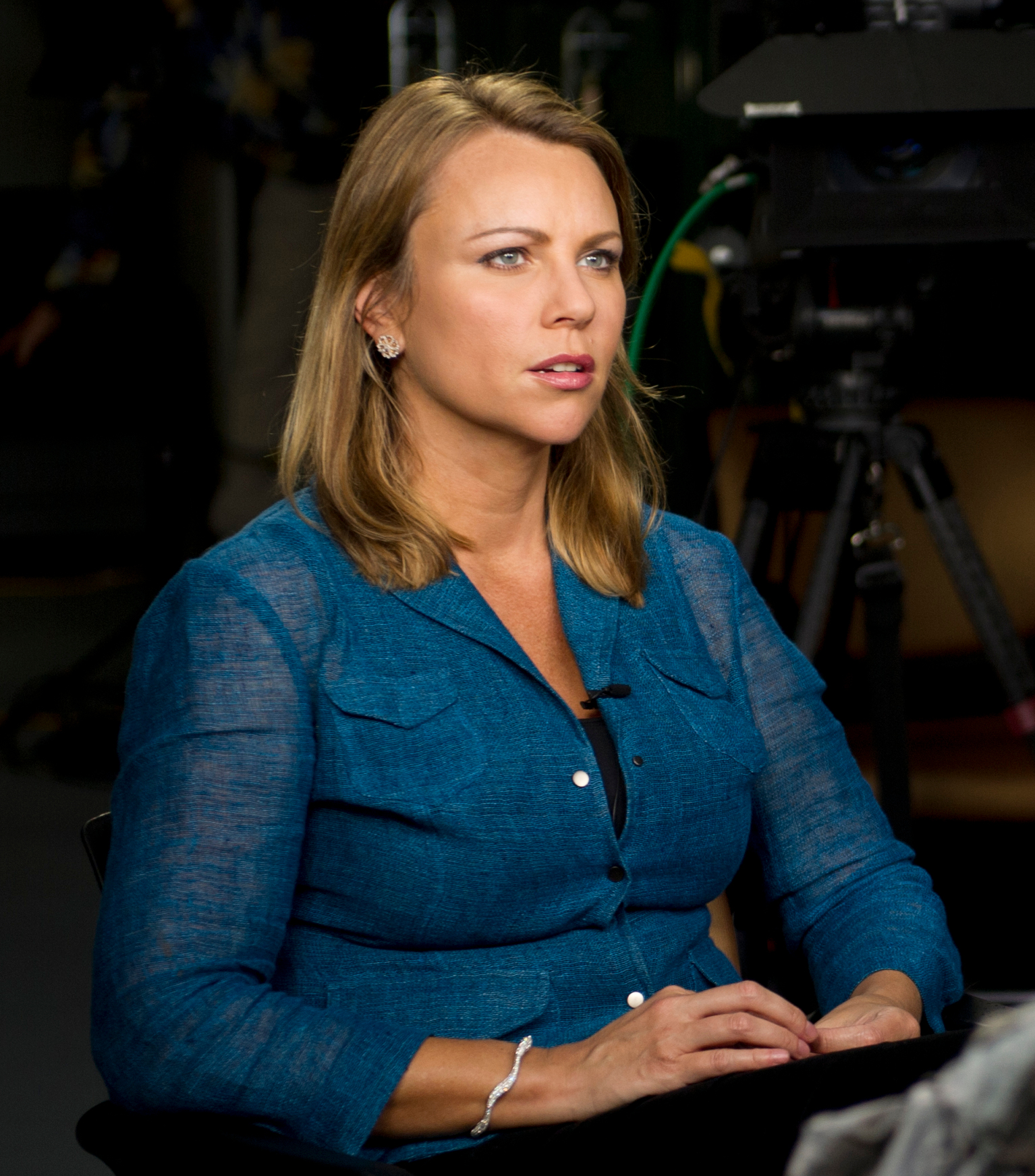
Lara Logan, South African journalist and war correspondent

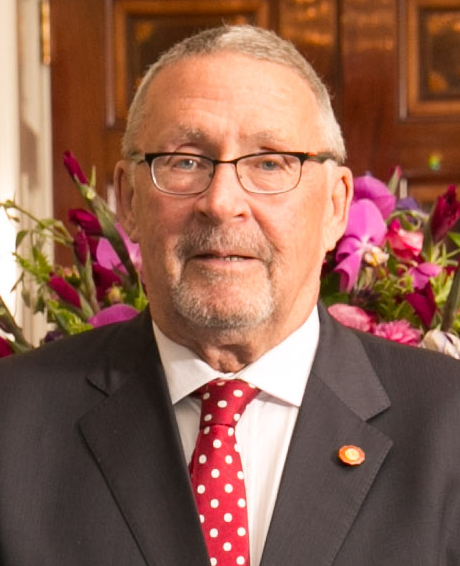
Guy Scott, Vice President of Zambia from September 2011 to January 2015 and Interim President from October 2014 to January 2015

- European percentage peaks from total population during the colonial era:
  - South Africa: 21%
  - French Algeria: 16%
  - South-West Africa (current Namibia): 14%
  - Italian Libya: 13%
  - Tunisia Protectorate: 10%
  - Southern Rhodesia (current Zimbabwe): 8%
  - Spanish Morocco: 5–10%
  - Portuguese Angola: 6.6%
  - French Morocco: 1–5%
  - Swaziland Protectorate: 1–5%
  - Spanish Sahara (current Western Sahara): 1–5%
  - Northern Rhodesia (current Zambia): 2%
  - Kenya: 1%
  - Rest of Africa: <1%

In most of colonial Africa, Europeans accounted for under 1% of the population, except for the colonies in Northern and Southern Africa, which had the highest proportion of European colonists.

=== Current population ===
There are 4.5 million white South Africans. Kenya, Zimbabwe, and Namibia all have white communities numbering in the tens of thousands, and thousands more are scattered among Angola, Zambia, Mozambique, Tanzania, Congo, Senegal, Gabon, and beyond. Many hold onto their British, Portuguese, German, French or Italian citizenships, but most have been on this continent all their lives.

— Christian Science Monitor correspondent Danna Harman, on Africa's white population of European descent in 2003.

It is impossible to verify the number of white Africans of European ancestry, as a number of African nations do not publish census data on race or ethnic origin. In 1989, the Encyclopædia Britannica editorial team estimated the size of Africa's total white population of European descent at 4.6 million, with the vast majority residing in coastal regions of North Africa or in the Republic of South Africa.

The white population of Zimbabwe was much higher in the 1960s and 1970s (when the country was known as Rhodesia); about 296,000 in 1975. This peak of around 8% of the population in 1975 dropped to possibly 120,000 in 1999, and had fallen to under 50,000 people by 2002.

== Dutch diaspora in Africa (Afrikaners) ==
=== South Africa ===
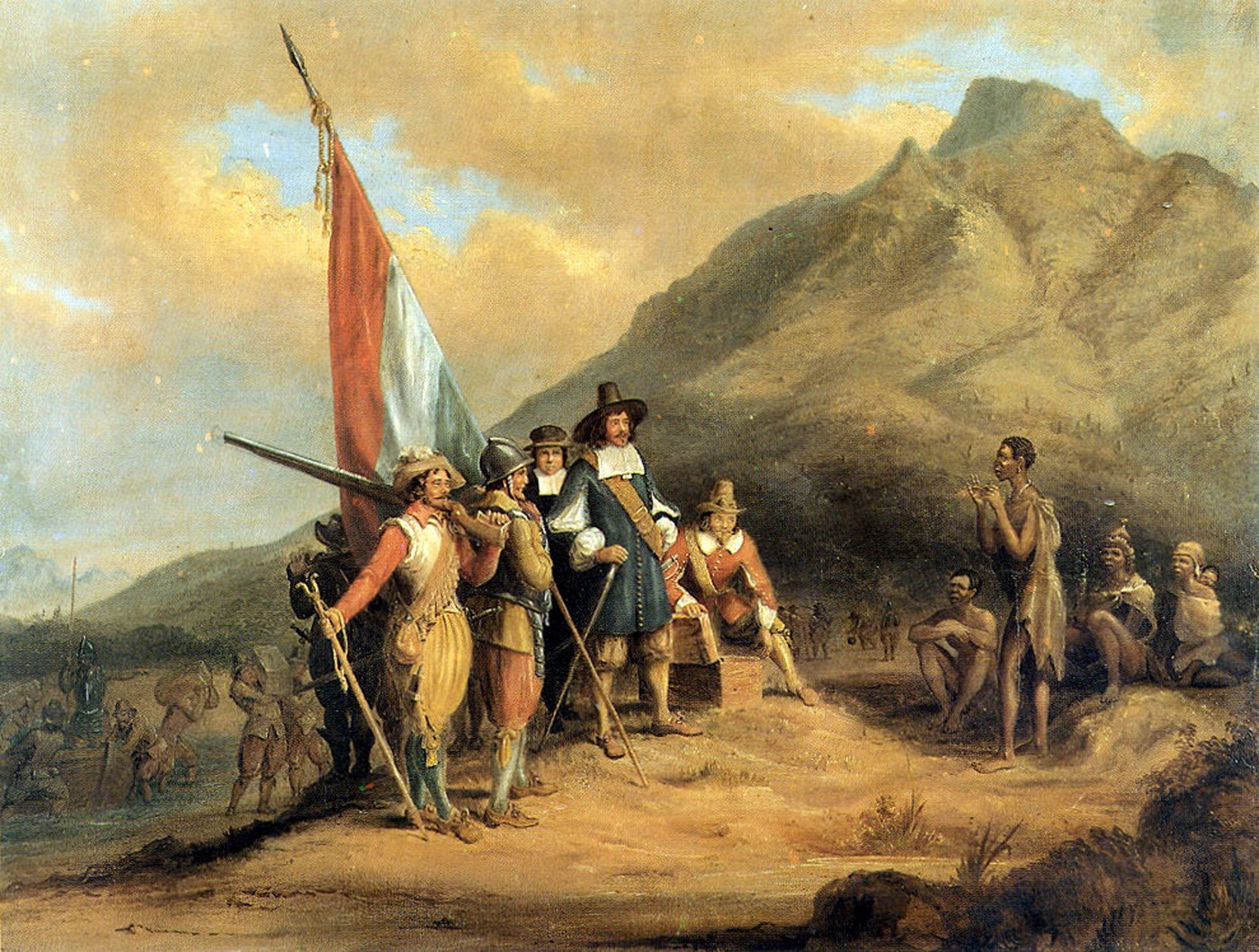
Painting depicting the arrival of Jan van Riebeeck, founder of Cape Town, and one of the earliest European colonists in sub-Saharan Africa

In the late sixteenth century, the Dutch East India Company (known more formally as the Vereenigde Oostindische Compagnie, or VOC) began routinely searching for sites on the African continent where its trading fleets could obtain fresh water and other supplies while en route to the Orient. Dutch ships began calling at the Cape of Good Hope as early as 1595, since the shoreline was not treacherous and fresh water could be easily obtained by landing parties without venturing too far inland. In 1651, the company built a storage facility and watering station, which included a vegetable garden to resupply its passing ships, at the Cape. Under the direction of Jan van Riebeeck, a small Dutch party also constructed a fort known as the Castle of Good Hope. Van Riebeeck obtained permission to bring Dutch immigrants to the Cape, and resettle former company employees there as farmers. The colonists were known as "vrijlieden", also denoted as vrijburgers (free citizens), to differentiate them from bonded VOC employees still serving on contracts. Since the primary purpose of the Cape colony at the time was to stock provisions for passing Dutch ships, the VOC offered grants of farmland to the vrijburgers on the condition they would cultivate crops for company warehouses. The vrijburgers were granted tax-exempt status for twelve years and loaned all the necessary seeds and farming implements they requested.

The VOC initially had strict requirements which the prospective vrijburgers had to fulfill: they were to be married Dutch citizens, of good character, and had to undertake to spend twenty years at the Cape. During the late seventeenth and early eighteenth centuries, however, many foreigners were amongst those who boarded ships in the Netherlands to settle in the Dutch sphere. As a result, by 1691 a third of the vrijburger population of the fledgling colony was not ethnically Dutch. The heterogeneous European community included large numbers of German military recruits in the service of the VOC, as well as French Huguenot refugees driven into overseas exile by the Edict of Fontainebleau. As the size of the vrijburger population expanded, the colonists began expanding deeper into the interior of Southern Africa; by 1800 the size of the fledgling Dutch Cape Colony was about 170,000 square kilometers; about six times the area of the Netherlands.

The vast size of the colony made it almost impossible for the VOC to control the vrijburger population, and the colonists became increasingly independent. Attempts by the company administration to reassert its authority and regulate the vrijburgers' activities was met with resistance. Successive generations of colonists born in the colony became localised in their loyalties and national identity and regarded the colonial government with a mixture of apathy and suspicion. In the early 1700s, this emerging class of people began identifying as Afrikaners, rather than Dutch subjects, after their adopted homeland. Afrikaners who settled directly on the colony's frontiers were also known collectively as Boers, to describe their agricultural way of life.

In 1769, the northward migration of Boers was met by a southward migration of Xhosa, a Bantu people which laid claim to the Cape region north of the Great Fish River. This triggered a series of bloody frontier conflicts which raged until 1879, known as the Xhosa Wars. Both the Boers and Xhosa organised raiding parties that frequently crossed the river and stole livestock from the other group. Meanwhile, the VOC had been forced to declare bankruptcy and the Dutch government assumed direct responsibility for the Cape in 1794. After Napoleon's occupation of the Netherlands during the Flanders Campaign, Great Britain captured the Cape Colony to prevent France from laying claim to its strategic harbour. Although the Dutch authorities were permitted to administer the Cape again for a brief interlude between 1803 and 1806, the British launched another invasion of the colony as a result of political developments in Europe and became permanent. Relations between the new colonial leadership and the Boers soon began to deteriorate when the British refused to subsidise the Cape Colony, insisting that it pay for itself by levying larger taxes on the white population. In addition to raising taxes, the British administration abolished the burgher senate, the only Dutch-era form of government at the Cape. It also took measures to bring the Boer population under control by establishing new courts and judiciaries along the frontier.

Boer resentment of the British peaked in 1834, when the Slavery Abolition Act 1833 was passed, outlawing slavery throughout the British Empire. All 35,000 enslaved people registered with the Cape governor were to be freed and given rights on par with other citizens, although in most cases the slavers could retain them as paid apprentices until 1838. Many Boers, especially those involved in grain and wine production, had enslaved people at the time, and the number of people they had enslaved correlated greatly to their production output. The British government offered preexisting slavers compensation for the freeing of enslaved people, but payment had to be claimed in person in London, and few Boers possessed the funds to travel there. The abolition of slavery, along with Boer grievances over taxation and the perceived Anglicisation of the Cape judiciary, triggered the Great Trek: an eastward migration of 15,000 Boers determined to escape British rule by homesteading beyond the Cape Colony's frontiers. The Great Trek brought the migrating Boers, known as the Voortrekkers, into direct conflict with the Zulu Empire, upon which they inflicted a decisive defeat at the Battle of Blood River in February 1838. The Voortrekkers eventually established several independent Boer republics deep in the southern African interior, the most prominent of which were the Natalia Republic, the Orange Free State, and the South African Republic (also known simply as the Transvaal).

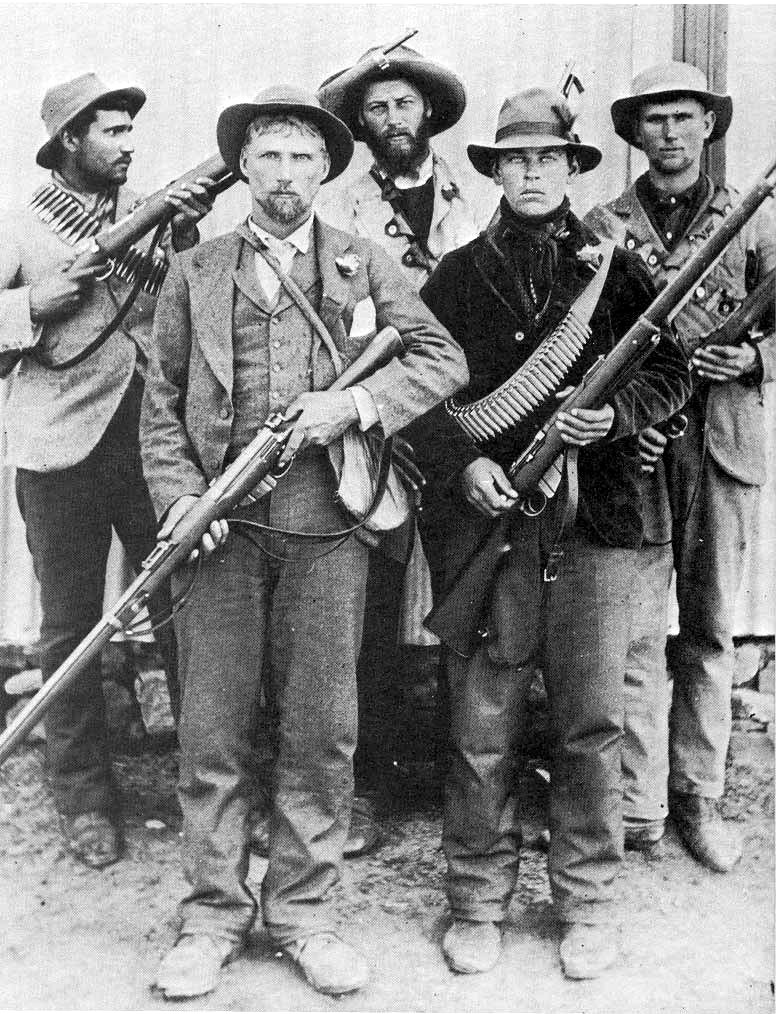
Boer guerrillas during the Second Boer War, 1900

British expansion of the Cape Colony into South Africa's interior followed the Boer migration within the subsequent decades; in 1843 Britain annexed the Natalia Republic, and in 1877 it annexed the Transvaal. The Transvaal Boers subsequently went to war with the British in 1880, which became known as the First Boer War. The war was resolved with the Pretoria Convention, by which Great Britain restored independence to the Transvaal and withdrew from the territory. However, relations between the Boer republics and the British administration at the Cape remained poor, with the latter concerned that Boer independence was a lingering threat to the Cape's strategic security. In 1899, the Second Boer War broke out when the British rejected an ultimatum by the Transvaal to remove its military presence from the latter's borders. The first stages of the war consisted of several unsuccessful Boer sieges of British colonies, followed by a British push into the two Boer republics. The last stage of the war consisted of Boer guerrillas, termed "bitter-enders", who refused to lay down their arms and took several years to defeat. In early 1902, the Boers finally surrendered under the terms of the Treaty of Vereeniging, which annexed the Transvaal and Orange Free State into the Cape (forming the Union of South Africa) in exchange for allowing the former Boer republics some form of political autonomy and granting financial assistance to aid in postwar reconstruction.

The postwar years saw the dramatic rise of Afrikaner nationalism, as many of the former Boer military leaders turned to politics and came to dominate the legislatures of the Transvaal and Orange Free State. An Afrikaner party was also elected for the first time in the Cape Colony in 1908. Afrikaner politicians heavily promoted the use of Afrikaans, a language derived from the Middle Dutch dialect spoken by the colonial vrijburger population, as a fundamental part of Afrikaner identity and national consciousness. In 1908 and 1909, a constitutional convention was held for the establishment of a self-governing dominion which incorporated the old Boer republics into a unitary state with the Cape Colony and the Natal. This emerged as the Union of South Africa in 1910. Due to the fact that the electorate was limited predominantly to white South Africans, Afrikaners–which composed over half the white population at the time–quickly achieved political ascendancy. Afrikaners occupied the top political positions in South African government from 1910 until 1994, when the country held its first multiracial elections under a universal franchise. Prior to 1994, the Afrikaner ruling party with the longest tenure in South Africa was the National Party, which was noted for introducing a strict system of racial segregation known as apartheid in 1948, and declaring the country a republic in 1961.

The size of the Afrikaner population in South Africa was estimated at 2.5 million people in 1985. According to the country's 2011 census, there were about 2.7 million white South Africans who spoke Afrikaans as a first language, or slightly over 5% of the total population.

=== Namibia ===
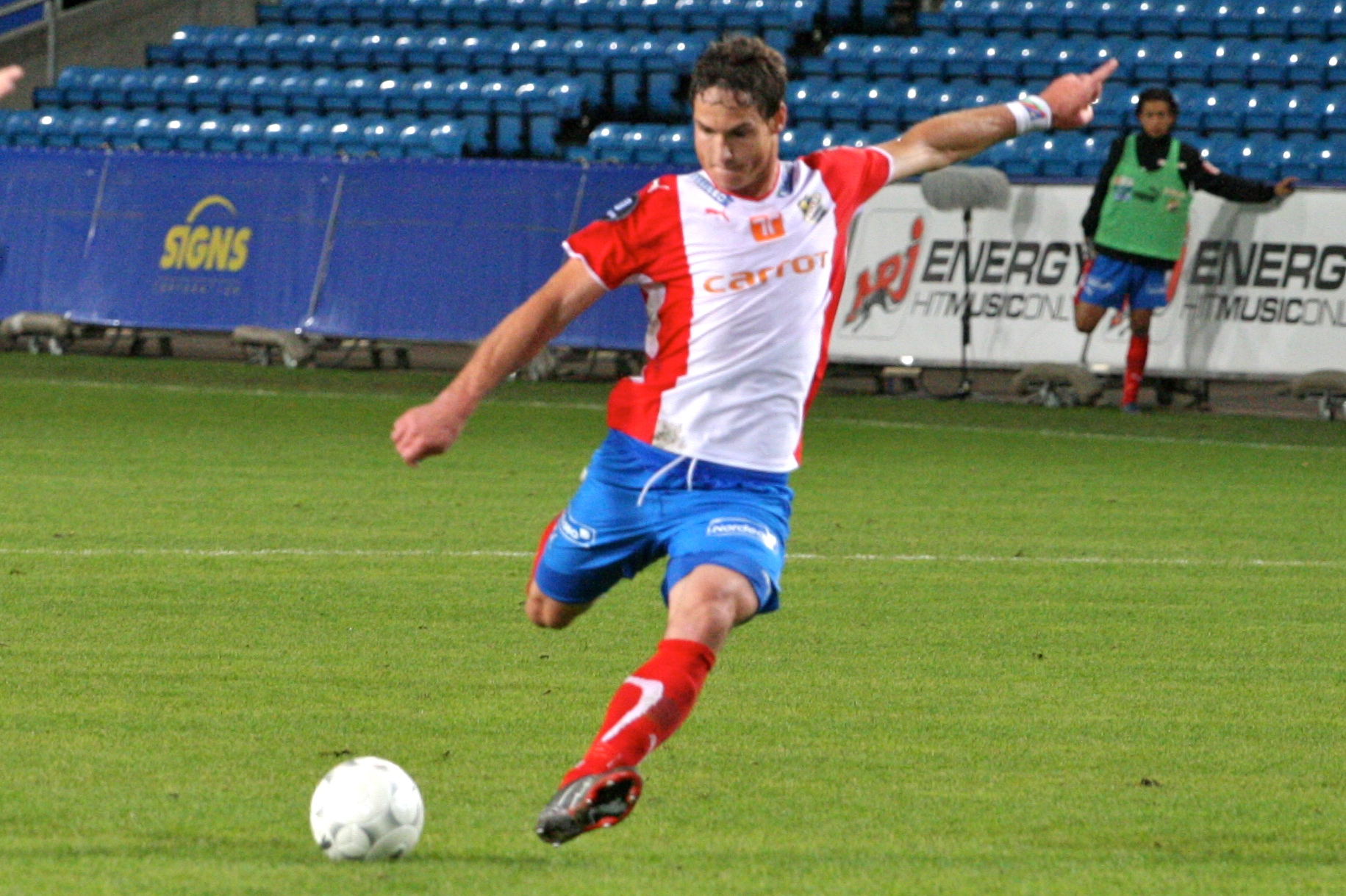
Oliver Risser, former Namibian footballer of German origin

In the mid to late 19th century and beforehand, South African trekboers found their way into Namibia (then South-West Africa) and established colonies. A significant number even penetrated as far north as Angola during the Dorsland Trek.

The South-West became a German colony during the late 19th century, and with the onset of the First World War a number of local Boers volunteered to serve with the imperial authorities against invading Allied troops. After that conflict left the territory under South African occupation, thousands of fresh Afrikaner migrants poured into the region to occupy available plots of prime stock-farming land and exploit untapped resources. Their government further encouraged new colonists by offering easy loans, necessary infrastructure, and more expropriated land to white newcomers. This policy was generally considered a success, as South-West Africa's white population more than doubled between 1913 and 1936.

Current estimates for the Afrikaner population in Namibia range from 60,000 to 120,000; they continue to make up the majority of the country's white citizens. 45% of the best ranging and agricultural land is presently owned by Namibians of European background, mostly Afrikaner ranchers.

=== Botswana ===
As early as 1815, individual Afrikaners had begun to arrive in what is today modern Botswana, mainly traders and ivory hunters from the Cape of Good Hope. By the mid nineteenth century, some of these itinerant Afrikaners had settled in Molepolole. In 1852, the Transvaal Boers organised a failed expedition against the Northern Tswana people which included several relatively large engagements such as the Battle of Dimawe. As a result of this raid, the Tswana launched a series of retaliatory raids into the northern Transvaal which forced the Boers to evacuate Swartruggens. In 1853, Transvaal President Paul Kruger signed an armistice with Tswana chief Sechele I, ending the state of war and checking further Boer expansion into Botswana for decades.

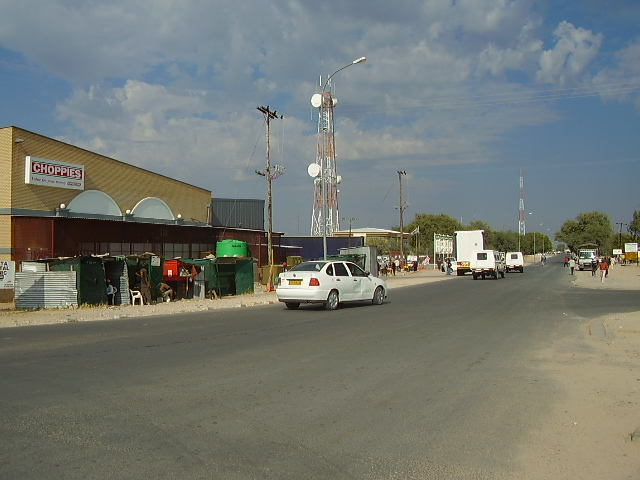
Ghanzi, Botswana, home to a large Afrikaner community

A notable voortrekker community was established inadvertently near Ghanzi in 1877. Ghanzi was settled by migrating Boers from the Dorsland Trek who had lost their wagons and supplies in the central Kalahari, and were forced to seek sanctuary near the water source there.

After the establishment of the Bechuanaland Protectorate in the 1880s, the British colonial authorities and the British South Africa Company (BSAC) designated several parts of the region as freehold farming areas, open to white farmers of any nationality. This induced hundreds of Boer migrants to resettle there.

In 1894 the BSAC made a concentrated attempt to recruit Boers from the Transvaal and Orange Free State to settle the area around Lake Ngami. This was an attempt to control the large numbers of wandering trekboers in both regions by diverting them into territory already under British control rather than risk them establishing new Boer republics further abroad. The British also hoped that a large Boer population along the frontiers of Bechuaneland would serve as a potential buffer to German colonial expansionism from the west. From 1898 until the early 1900s, a small but steady stream of Boers began trekking towards Lake Ngami from South Africa, with the vast majority concentrating around the previously established Afrikaans-speaking community at Ghanzi. In 1928, the size of Ghanzi's population was bolstered by the arrival of a number of Boer exiles from Angola, who had departed that territory due to disputes with the Portuguese colonial government there. Most of the Boers were engaged in cattle ranching, using the vast, unpopulated lands around Ghanzi as a massive range to drive their herds. For a number of years, one of Botswana's most prominent white politicians was Christian de Graaff, who represented Ghanzi's southern district in the National Assembly.

Aside from those engaged in ranching and farming, a small number of recent Afrikaner migrants have moved to Botswana in the postcolonial era to manage small businesses.

As a group, Afrikaners formed 1.2% of Botswana's total population in 2009.

=== Zimbabwe ===
While Afrikaners were always a small minority in Zimbabwe's population, some did arrive with the early pioneer columns and permanently settled, especially in the Enkeldoorn farming areas. After 1907, an increasing number of dispossessed Boers arrived in what was then the British territory of Southern Rhodesia, seeking better economic opportunities. They soon found themselves discriminated against by the other Europeans, who expressed alarm at an "invasion" of "poor Dutch" and what they described as the "human wreckage of the Union". This aversion was condemned by elements in the South African press, which charged that "the settlement of Afrikaners in Rhodesia is being emphatically worked against".

During World War I, the Maritz Rebellion in South Africa caused consternation among Rhodesian authorities, prompting them to conclude that their colony's Afrikaner inhabitants could not be relied upon against the German Empire. In the following decades a sharp cleavage continued to divide Afrikaners from their English-speaking countrymen, reflecting entrenched divisions in class and culture. The former generally earned lower incomes, and never advanced far in capital, education, and influence. They were also considered to be Rhodesia's single most conservative white community, almost unanimously opposing a multiracial school system and any concessions to black Africans regarding land apportionment.

With the ensuing Rhodesian Bush War and Zimbabwean independence under Prime Minister Robert Mugabe by 1980, over one-fifth of white Rhodesians, including most resident Afrikaners, emigrated from the country.

=== Kenya ===
During and following the Boer Wars some Afrikaners chose to leave South Africa. The first 700 Afrikaner colonists that migrated to British East Africa were supporters of the British during the various conflicts. This first wave settled in the fertile Rift Valley. The community founded the colony of Eldoret in 1903 and played an important part in establishing agriculture in the region. An additional 100 Afrikaners arrived in 1911. At the height of British rule in the colony, the population composed of several thousand Afrikaners farming 2,600 square kilometres (1,000 square miles) around Eldoret. The Mau Mau Rebellion sparked great panic among the white community in the country and much of the Afrikaner community left the country and mostly returned to South Africa. However some continued to farm in the region long after independence, and were very successful in doing so.

=== Angola ===
There were originally around 2,000 Afrikaners in Angola, descendants of those who had survived Namibia's unforgiving Dorsland Trek. For fifty years they formed a distinct enclave in the underdeveloped Portuguese territory, joined by new Afrikaner migrants in 1893 and 1905. By 1928, however, the South African authorities arranged to have 300 such households repatriated to Outjo, where they settled comfortably into farming. The few Afrikaners who remained fled their homes during Angola's subsequent colonial and civil wars.

=== Tanzania and elsewhere ===
In the early 20th century a number of Afrikaners trekked into German Tanganyika, where they were parceled land by colonial authorities then attempting to boost agricultural production. After Tanganyika became a British trust territory on Germany's defeat during World War I, London reaffirmed such grants as they existed. Few Afrikaners stayed beyond the eve of Tanzanian independence in 1961.

With the retreat of European colonialism, Afrikaner communities outside South Africa and its immediate neighbours generally diminished in size and a significant number of colonists returned to their countries of origin during the decades which followed the Second World War.

== British in Africa ==
=== South Africa and the Cape Colony ===
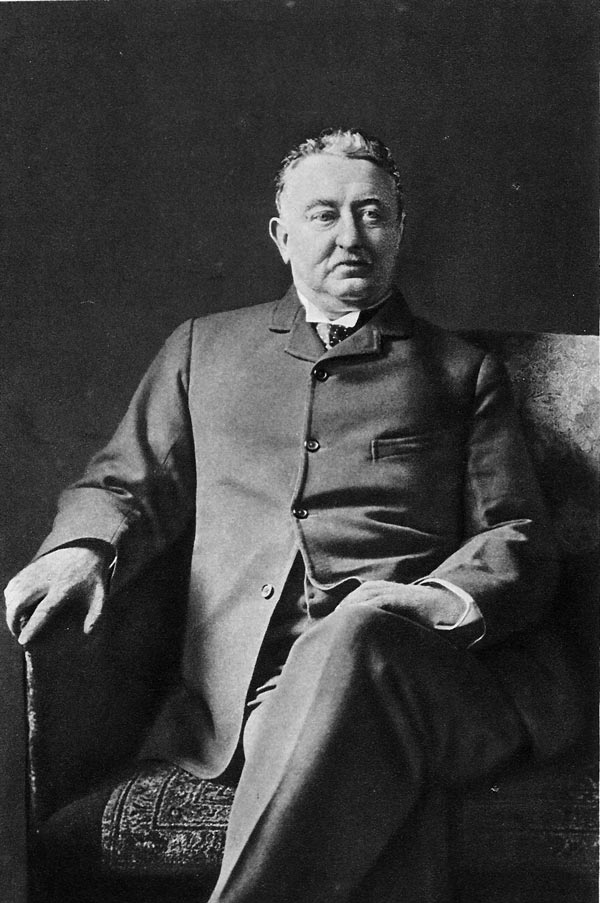
Cecil John Rhodes, the 6th Prime Minister of the Cape Colony and founder of the De Beers diamond company

Although there were small British colonies along the West African coast from the 18th century onwards, mostly consisting of trading posts and castles, British colonisation of Africa began in earnest only at the end of the 18th century, in the Cape of Good Hope. It gained momentum following British annexation of the Cape from the Dutch East India Company, and the subsequent encouragement of migrating colonists in the Eastern Cape in an effort to consolidate the colony's eastern border.

In the late 19th century, the discovery of gold and diamonds further encouraged colonisation of South Africa by the British. The search for gold drove expansion north into the Rhodesias (now Zimbabwe, Zambia, and Malawi). Simultaneously, British colonists began expansion into the fertile uplands (often called the "White Highlands") of British East Africa (in Kenya). Most of these colonies were not planned by the British government, with many colonial officials concluding they upset the balance of power in the region and left the long-established British interests vulnerable.

Cecil Rhodes utilized his wealth and connections towards organizing this ad hoc movement and colonisation into a unified British policy. This policy had as its general aim the securing of a Cairo to Cape Town railway system, and colonising the upper highlands of East Africa and the whole of Southern Africa south of the Zambezi with British colonies in a manner akin to that of North America and Australasia.

However, prioritization of British power around the globe in the years before World War I, initially reduced the resources appropriated toward colonisation. World War I and the Great Depression and the general decline of British and European birthrates further hobbled the expected colonist numbers. Nonetheless, thousands of colonists arrived each year during the decades preceding World War II, mostly in South Africa, where the birthrates of British Africans increased suddenly. Despite a general change in British policy against supporting the establishment of European colonies in Africa, and a slow abandonment in the overall British ruling and common classes for a separate European identity, large colonial appendages of European separatist supporters of continued colonial rule were well entrenched in South Africa, Rhodesia, and Kenya.

In keeping with the general trend toward non-European rule evident throughout most of the globe during the Cold War and the abandonment of colonial possessions in the face of American and Soviet pressure, the vestigial remnants of Cecil Rhodes' vision was abruptly ended, leaving British colonists in an exposed, isolated, and weak position. Black Nationalist guerrilla forces aided by Soviet expertise and weapons soon drove the colonists into a fortress mentality which led to the break-off of ties with perceived collaborationist governments in the United Kingdom and Commonwealth.

The result was a series of conflicts which eventually led to a reduced presence of White Africans due to emigration and natural death.

==== Since 1994 ====
Hundreds of thousands of British-South Africans left the nation to start new lives abroad, settling in the United Kingdom, Australia, New Zealand, United States, Canada, and the Netherlands. In spite of the high emigration rates, a large number of white foreign immigrants from countries such as United Kingdom and Zimbabwe have settled in the country. For example, by 2005, an estimated 212,000 British citizens were residing in South Africa. By 2011, this number may have grown to 500,000. Since 2003, the numbers of British immigrants coming to South Africa has risen by 50%. An estimated 20,000 British immigrants moved to South Africa in 2007. South Africa is ranked as the top destination of British retirees and pensioners in Africa.

There was also a significant number of arrivals of white Zimbabweans of British ancestry, fleeing their home country in light of the economic, political problems which faced the country and persecution at the hands of the ZANU government. As well as recent arrivals, a significant number of white Zimbabweans of British descent emigrated to South Africa after the independence of Zimbabwe in 1980. The greatest white British populations in South Africa are in the KwaZulu-Natal province and in cities such as Johannesburg and Cape Town.

=== Zambia ===
At the brink of the country's independence in 1964, there were roughly 70,000 Europeans (mostly British) in Zambia (Northern Rhodesia before independence), making up roughly 2.3% of the 3 million inhabitants at the time. Zambia had a different situation compared to other African countries. It included segregation, similar to South Africa, Rhodesia (Zimbabwe) and South-West Africa (Namibia); but as the Europeans constituted a smaller fraction of the population they did not dominate politics. There were a few cities in Northern Rhodesia that had British place names, but all except one (Livingstone) were changed when the country became independent or soon after. These included:

- Abercorn → Mbala (1964)
- Bancroft → Chililabombwe
- Broken Hill → Kabwe (1966)
- Feira → Luangwa (1964)
- Fort Jameson → Chipata
- Fort Rosebery → Mansa

Vice President Guy Scott served as acting president of Zambia after the death of Michael Sata, the first (and so far only) white head of state of an African country since FW de Klerk in 1994, and the first outside South Africa since Ian Smith in 1979.

==== Livingstone ====
A good example of segregation in Zambia before independence was in the city of Livingstone, on the border with Zimbabwe. This featured a white town, with black townships, which were also found in South Africa and Namibia. In Zambia, however, Livingstone was one of the few places in the country that used this system and was close to the Rhodesian border. British influence was reflected in town and city names. Livingstone (which is currently the only town left with a British name) was nearly changed to Maramba, but the decision was later dismissed. When Zambia became independent in 1964, the majority of white colonists left for Rhodesia, just by crossing the border. An almost identical town of Victoria Falls lies on the other side.

=== Kenya ===
There were 60,000 mostly Anglophone white people living in Kenya in 1965. However, encouraged by the fear brought by the Mau Mau Uprising, nearly half of Kenya's European population emigrated out of the country after Kenya's independence from colonial rule. Today, they are estimated to be around 30,000. Well known white people born in Kenya include road racing cyclist Chris Froome, biologist Richard Dawkins, singer Roger Whittaker, and evolutionary scientist Richard Leakey.

=== Zimbabwe ===
In contrast to the rest of Central Africa, Zimbabwe (formerly Rhodesia) was once intended to become a "white man's country" – to be settled and ruled by European colonists who would remain there permanently. Until Zimbabwean independence in 1980, White Rhodesians prevailed over the nation politically, socially, and economically. They numbered some 240,000 by late-1979. Most were fairly recent immigrants, particularly blue collar workers attracted by the promise Rhodesia's economic opportunities offered. Throughout the 1960s they were joined by White South Africans and white colonists fleeing independent colonies elsewhere.

The white population in Zimbabwe dropped from a peak of around 300,000 in 1975 to 170,000 in 1982 and was estimated at no more than 50,000 in 2002, possibly much lower. However, some White farmers have returned in recent years to work with Black landowners in joint land ventures. White Zimbabweans remain part of Zimbabwe's agricultural, manufacturing, finance and retail, tourism and conservation industries. Estimates of the population have ranged from between 25,000 and 55,000 people.

=== Angola ===
When Angola won independence from Portugal in 1975, most British people in Angola resettled in the United Kingdom, South Africa, Namibia (South-West Africa), Zimbabwe (Rhodesia), Portugal or Brazil. Meanwhile, most from Mozambique left for either Zimbabwe (Rhodesia), South Africa or the UK. However, even before 1975, the number of British people in Angola and Mozambique was small, especially compared to the inhabiting Portuguese population.

=== Mozambique ===
When Mozambique gained independence from Portugal in 1975, most British people left for either Rhodesia or South Africa, while others resettled in Portugal and Brazil. However, just like Angola, the British population in Mozambique is/was tiny compared to both their share of the nation's population and in comparison to the Portuguese.

=== Elsewhere ===
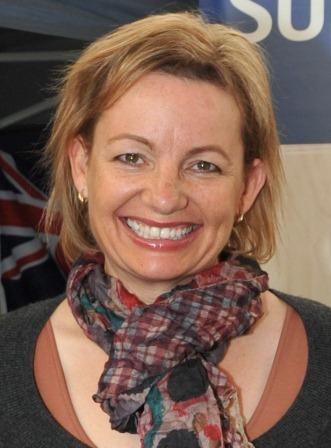
Former Liberal Party of Australia leader Sussan Ley, who was born in Nigeria

Sizable numbers of people of British descent are also nationals of Ghana, Namibia, Tanzania, Swaziland (3% of the population), Nigeria, and Botswana. In addition, nearly 10,000 white Ugandans of British extraction were living under the regime of Idi Amin as recorded by Time Magazine in 1972. Due to the subsequent deterioration of conditions under Amin (including the constant threat of forced expulsion), most of the local British diaspora emigrated to the United Kingdom and South Africa. In 2006, approximately 2,500 Britons lived in Uganda.

=== Scots in Africa ===
==== Nyasaland (Malawi) ====
The Scots played an enormous part in British overseas colonisation, alongside the English and Welsh. Scotland supplied colonial troops, administrators, governors, prospectors, architects, and engineers to help construct the colonies all over the world.

From the 1870s, Scottish churches began missionary work in Nyasaland/Malawi, in the wake of their illustrious predecessor, David Livingstone. Their pressure on the British Government resulted in Nyasaland being declared a British Protectorate. A small Scottish community was established here, and other Scots immigration occurred in Southern Rhodesia/Zimbabwe, Northern Rhodesia/Zambia, and South Africa. The table below represents how small their numbers were compared to other sections of the future Central African Federation.

Numbers of white and black inhabitants in the federation
Year	Southern Rhodesia		Northern Rhodesia		Nyasaland	
Year	White	Black	White	Black	White	Black
1927	38,200	922,000	4,000	1,000,000	1,700	1,350,000
1946	80,500	1,600,000	21,919	1,634,980	2,300	2,340,000

The largest city and commercial capital of the country, Blantyre, is named after a town in Scotland and birthplace of David Livingstone. The reason for the small number of Europeans was mainly the lack of mineral resources (Northern Rhodesia had copper and Southern Rhodesia has gold).

After Nyasaland became independent (and upon adopting a new name, Malawi), many Scots returned to Scotland or moved to South Africa or Rhodesia (formerly Southern Rhodesia and later known as Zimbabwe). Despite this, Scots had an enormous South African community (compared to that of Nyasaland).

To this day most Scots in Africa reside in South Africa and until the 21st century, also in Zimbabwe (formerly Rhodesia). Most Scottish colonists from Rhodesia left for South Africa after Rhodesia's independence and after economic and political problems in 2001. Evidence of the continued Scottish influence is seen in the continuing traditions of Highland games and pipe bands, especially in Natal. Ties between Scotland and Malawi also remain strong.

== French in Africa ==
=== North Africa ===
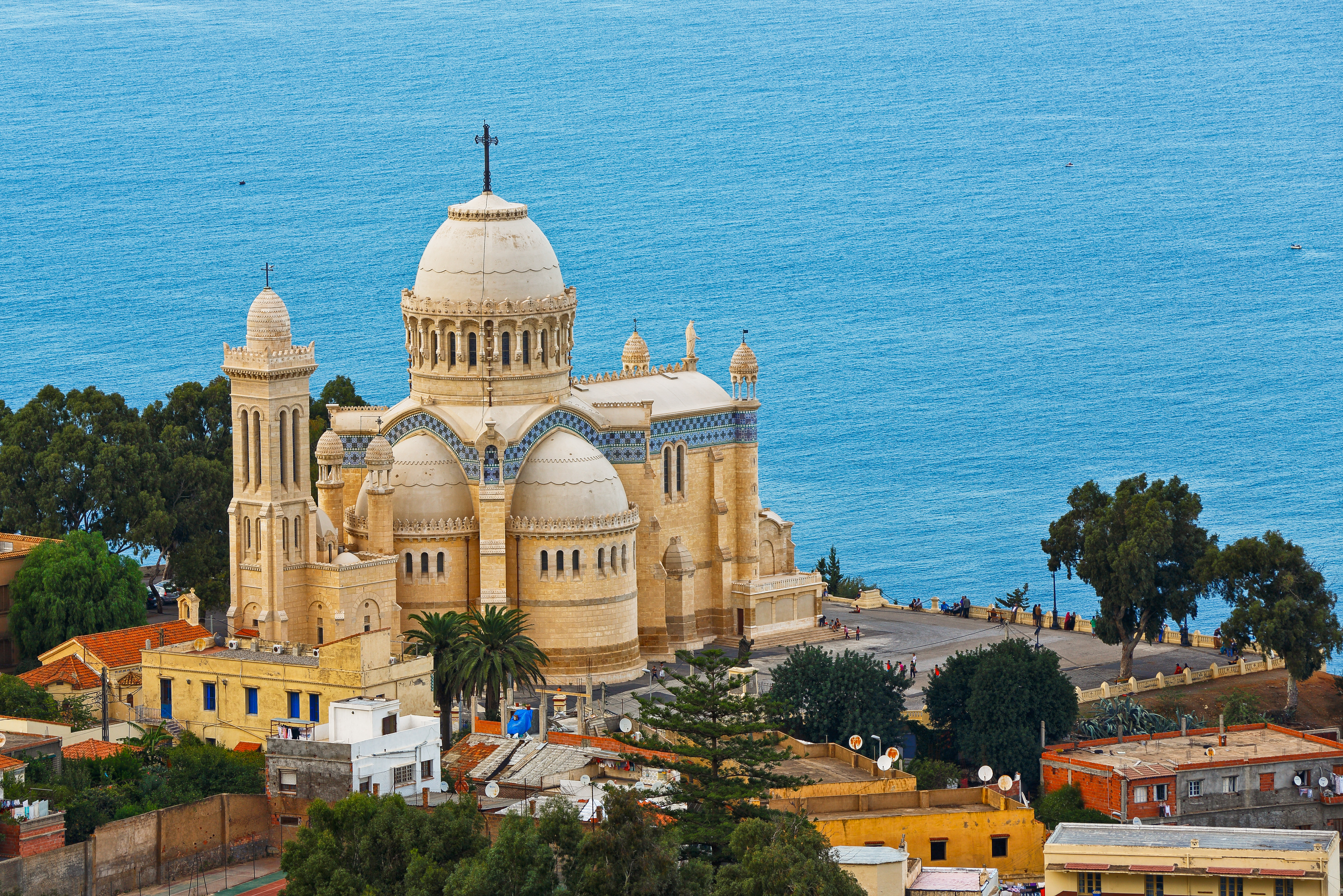
Notre Dame d'Afrique, a church built by the French Pieds-Noirs in Algeria

Large numbers of French people settled in French North Africa from the 1840s onward. By the end of French rule in the early 1960s there were over one million European Algerians, mostly of French origin and Catholic (known as pieds noirs, or "black feet"), living in Algeria, consisting about 16% of the population in 1962.

There were 255,000 Europeans in Tunisia in 1956, while Morocco was home to half a million Europeans. French law made it easy for thousands of colons, ethnic or national French from former colonies of Africa, French India and French Indochina, to live in mainland France. After Algeria became independent in 1962, about 800,000 Pieds-Noirs of French nationality were evacuated to mainland France while about 200,000 chose to remain in Algeria. Of the latter, there were still about 100,000 in 1965 and about 50,000 by the end of the 1960s. 1.6 million European colons migrated from Algeria, Tunisia, and Morocco.

As of December 31, 2011, there were 94,382 French citizens in all three countries.

=== Francophone West Africa ===
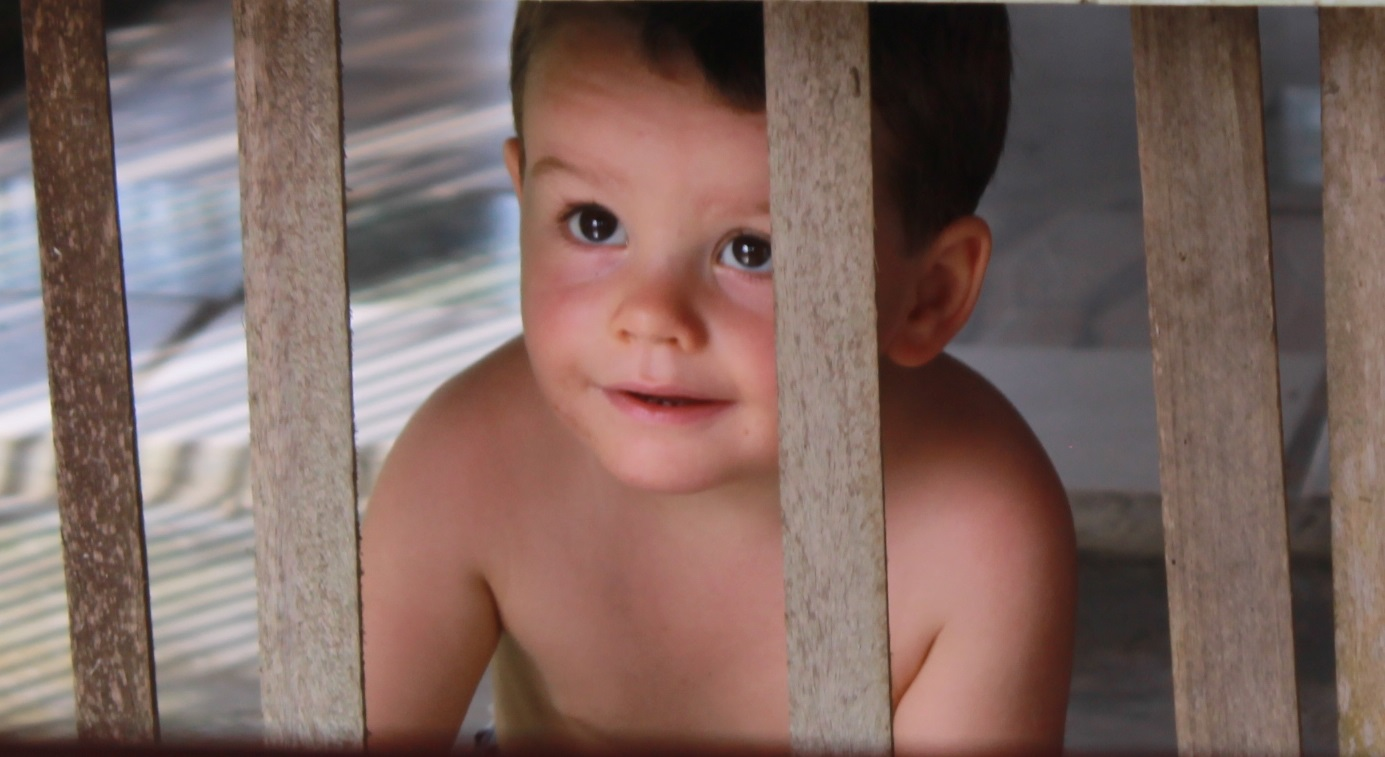
A European child in Gabon

Unlike Algeria, permanent European colonisation in most of France's tropical African colonies was not especially successful; during World War II the entire white population of French West Africa numbered only about 22,000. Immigration to French West Africa spiked after the war due to an influx of French people seeking to escape depressed economic opportunities at home. In June 1951, there were 49,904 whites of French origin in French West Africa, as well as an undetermined number of Europeans of other nationalities. The total number of white residents in these colonies never exceeded 0.3% of the population, and was predominantly urban: two-thirds of them lived in one of French West Africa's nine administrative capitals. Their most popular destination was Senegal, where over half the French-speaking whites resided. Nevertheless, French West Africa's white population remained subject to a high turnover rate; in 1951 78% of this group had been born in France, and the number of European families which had lived in Dakar for more than a generation was described as "negligible". The postwar influx also introduced the phenomenon of unemployed whites in French West Africa, who were mostly unskilled workers that secured only temporary jobs or were not engaged in any specific profession, and found themselves having to compete with a growing skilled black workforce. It also contributed to a rise in housing segregation as exclusively white neighbourhoods became more common.

Following the dissolution of French West Africa and the independence of its constituent states, sizable white minorities survived in Gabon and the Ivory Coast. 2,500 French people reside in Chad. 4,500 French soldiers reside in Burkina Faso, Chad, Mali, Mauritania and Niger. 3,000 French reside in Mali and 1,000 French soldiers reside in Niger.

=== Chad ===
In French Chad, suffrage was universal but racially divided so that Europeans and Africans had separate electoral colleges. The capital, Fort Lamy, had a district reserved for white residents (the European quarter), which elected four of its own representatives to the municipal council. Europeans also resided in racially mixed districts of the city. The European quarter still existed several years after independence, and there were 3,308 permanent white residents in the city in 1962, almost entirely French, comprising a little over 4% of the city's population. Europeans in French Chad were politically active and had political parties of their own with representation in the Territorial Assembly and municipal councils, including the Action Démocratique et Sociale (ADS), a local branch of the Rally of the French People, and Union Indépendante pour la Défense des Intérêts Communaux (UIDIC). Both parties would later join the Action Social Tchadienne (AST), a conservative party, when the separate electoral colleges were dissolved.

=== Djibouti ===
In 1917, Djibouti (then French Somaliland) had a European population of 294, of which 107 were French. In 1974, 10,255 Europeans lived in the colony, which gained independence just 3 years later.

=== Madagascar ===
A sizeable number of French people reside in Madagascar, many of whom trace their ties to Madagascar back to the colonial period. An estimated 20,000 French citizens lived and worked in Madagascar in 2011. The numbers make Madagascar the home of the largest ethnic French population in terms of absolute numbers in Sub-Saharan Africa, other than the French département Réunion.

=== Mauritius ===
Franco-Mauritians account for approximately 2% of the population of Mauritius.

=== Réunion ===
In Réunion, a French island in the Indian Ocean, white islanders, mostly of ethnic French origin, are estimated to make up approximately 30% of the population. 260,000 white people live in Réunion.

=== South Africa ===
==== Huguenots ====
A large number of French Huguenots settled in the Cape Colony, following their expulsion from France in the 17th century. However, the use of the French language was discouraged and many of their descendants intermarried with the Dutch. This early contact is visible in the Francophone names of a few historic towns in Western Cape such as Courtrai and in the surnames of some Afrikaners and Cape Coloureds, such as Marais, Joubert, de Lille, and du Plessis. The Huguenot-descended South African community is the largest in France's African diaspora.

Franschhoek (meaning French Corner in Dutch) is a large town in the Western Cape, so named for the French Huguenots, who traveled and settled there. There is a striking French influence in the town, which can be found firstly in street names which include La Rochelle Street, Bordeaux Street, Huguenot Street, Roux Malherbe Street, and Cabriere Street. Nearby farms, hamlets, and villages often hold French names such as La Roux; a township north of Franschhoek, Chamonix Estate, and so forth. Many Huguenot-dedicated buildings have been erected in Franschhoek, the major one being the Huguenot Monument.

In 1979, there were 49 Huguenot congregations in South Africa.

==== Franco Mauritians ====
Between 1945 and 1969, many Franco-Mauritians emigrated to South Africa. In 1981, their population in the KwaZulu Natal province was estimated at more than 12,000.

== Portuguese in Africa ==
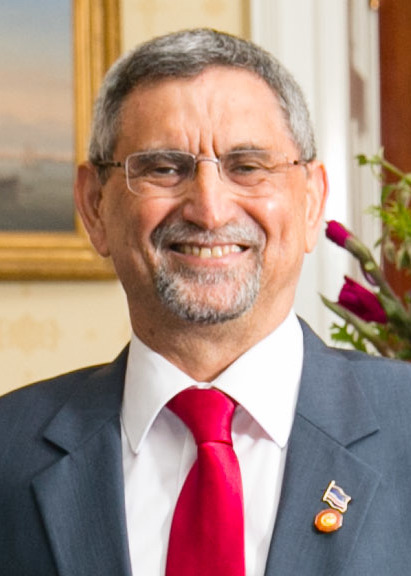
Jorge Carlos Fonseca, former President of Cape Verde

The first Portuguese colonies in Africa were built in the 15th century. The descendants of the soldiers who accompanied Christopher da Gama expedition to support the Ethiopian throne in the 16th century continued to exert a significant influence in that country's history over the next two centuries; for example, the Empress Mentewab was extremely proud of her Portuguese ancestry. In the late 17th century, much of Portuguese Mozambique was divided into prazos, or agricultural estates, which were settled by Portuguese families. In Portuguese Angola, namely in the areas of Luanda and Benguela, there was a significant Portuguese population. 20,000 people from the former Portuguese colony of Brazil currently live in Angola. In the islands of Cape Verde and São Tomé and Príncipe, besides Portuguese colonists, most of the population was of mixed Portuguese and African origin. The descendants of the Portuguese colonists who were born and raised locally since Portuguese colonial time were called crioulos. As of 2022, 421,136 or 71% of people living in Cape Verde has European ancestry, mostly Portuguese.

In the early 20th century, the Portuguese government encouraged white migration to the Portuguese territories of Angola and Mozambique, and by the 1960s, at the beginning of the Portuguese Colonial War, there were around 650,000 Portuguese colonists living in their overseas African provinces, and a substantial Portuguese population living in other African countries. In 1974, there were up to 1,000,000 Portuguese colonists living in their overseas African provinces. In 1975, Angola had a community of approximately 400,000 Portuguese, while Mozambique had approximately more than 350,000 colonists from Portugal.

Most Portuguese colonists were forced to return to Portugal (the retornados) as the country's African possessions gained independence in the mid-1970s, while others moved south to South Africa, which now has the largest Portuguese-African population (who between 50 and 80% came from Madeira), and to Brazil. When the Mozambican Civil War (1977–1992) began suddenly, large numbers of both Portuguese-born colonists and Mozambican-born colonists of Portuguese blood went out again.

However, after the war in Mozambique, more Portuguese colonists returned and the newer ones settled Mozambique while White Brazilians, especially those of Portuguese descent, moved to Mozambique to work as aid workers and investors and have adopted Mozambique as their home. It is estimated the population of Portuguese people in Mozambique has increased to over 20,000 since the peace settlement of Mozambique in 1992. Notable demographics of Portuguese Mozambicans could be found in cities like Maputo, Beira, and Nampula with Maputo accumulating the highest percentage. 82,593 Portuguese Mozambicans live in Mozambique as of 2012.

In recent years, some Portuguese have migrated to Angola for economic reasons, mainly the country's recent economic boom. In 2008, Angola was the preferred destination for Portuguese migrants in Africa. 300,000 white people with Portuguese heritage currently live in Angola. 500,000 are mixed race, half white and half black. The majority of Angolan whites live in Luanda, the capital of Angola. They represent 260,000 from the 2.5 million inhabitants or over 10% of Luanda.

=== Portuguese South Africans ===
South Africa largely featured two Portuguese waves of immigration, one was a constant but small flow of Portuguese from Madeira and Portugal itself, while the second was ethnic Portuguese fleeing from Angola and Mozambique after their respective independences. The reason behind the immigration of Madeirans to South Africa was both a political and economic one. After 1950, prime minister Hendrik Verwoerd encouraged immigration from Protestant northern Europeans, such as his own ethnic group the Dutch, to bolster the white population. He later began to approve immigration policies also favouring Southern Europeans, including Madeirans, who were facing high unemployment rates. Many Madeirans and other Portuguese who immigrated were at first isolated from other white populations due to their differences, such as the fact that few could speak English or Afrikaans and were Roman Catholic. Eventually they ended up setting up businesses in Johannesburg or coastal fisheries, and a substantial number intermarried with other white South African groups.

One known Portuguese South African creation was the restaurant chain Nando's, created in 1987, which incorporated influences from former Portuguese colonists from Mozambique, many of whom had settled on the south-eastern side of Johannesburg, after Mozambique's independence in 1975. There is currently a 300,000-strong Portuguese community in South Africa.

== Italians in Africa ==
=== Libya ===
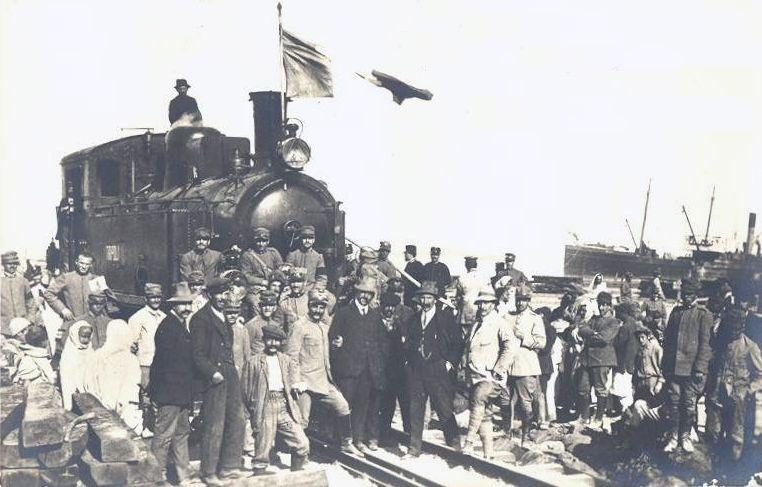
Arrival of the first Italian locomotive in Tripoli, Italian Tripolitania, in 1912

Libya had some 150,000 Italian colonists until World War II, constituting about 18% of the total population in Italian Libya. The Italians in Libya resided (and many still do) in most major cities like Tripoli (37% of the city was Italian), Benghazi (31%), and Hun (3%). Their numbers decreased after World War II. Most of Libya's Italians were expelled from the North African country in 1970, a year after Muammar Gaddafi seized power (a "day of vengeance" on 7 October 1970), but a few hundred Italians returned to Libya in the 2000s.

Year	Italians	Percentage	Total Libya	Source for data on population
1936	112,600	13.26%	848,600	Enciclopedia Geografica Mondiale K-Z, De Agostini, 1996
1939	108,419	12.37%	876,563	Guida Breve d'Italia Vol.III, C.T.I., 1939 (Censimento Ufficiale)
1962	35,000	2.1%	1,681,739	Enciclopedia Motta, Vol.VIII, Motta Editore, 1969
1982	1,500	0.05%	2,856,000	Atlante Geografico Universale, Fabbri Editori, 1988
2004	22,530	0.4%	5,631,585	L'Aménagement Linguistique dans le Monde

=== Somalia ===
Somalia had over 50,000 Italian Somali colonists during World War II, constituting more than 5% of the total population in Italian Somaliland. The Italians resided in most major cities in the central and southern parts of the territory, with around 22,000 living in the capital Mogadishu. Other major areas of colonisation included Jowhar, which was founded by the Italian prince Luigi Amedeo, Duke of the Abruzzi. Italian used to be a major language, but its influence significantly diminished following independence. It is now most frequently heard among older generations and the educated. 1,000 Italian Somalis currently live in Somalia.

=== South African Italians ===
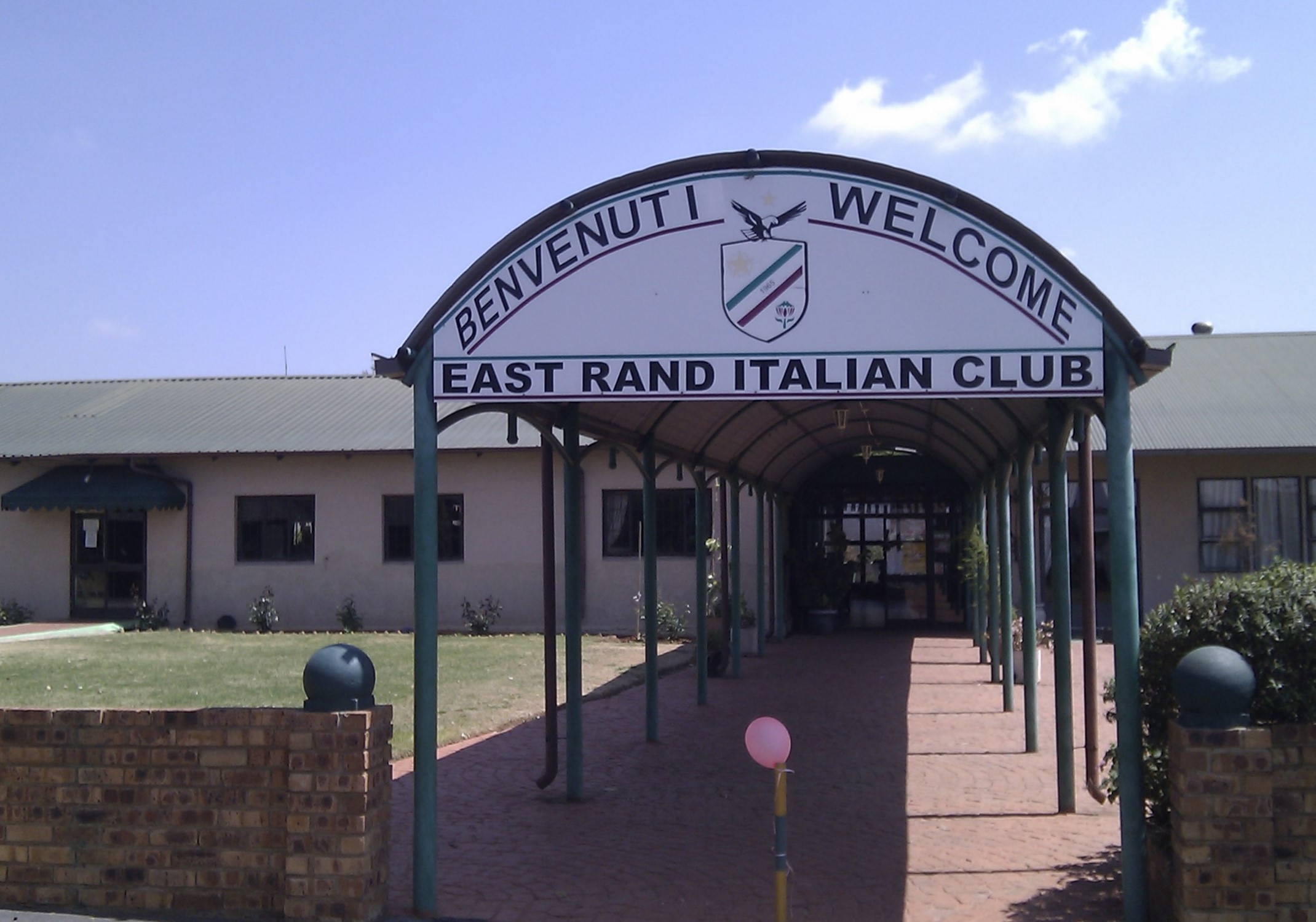
Italian Club in Boksburg

Although Italians did not immigrate to South Africa in large numbers, those who have arrived have nevertheless made an impact on the host country.

Before World War II, relatively few Italian immigrants arrived, though there were some prominent exceptions, such as the Cape's first Prime Minister John Molteno, who was of Anglo-Italian descent. South African Italians made big headlines during World War II, when Italians captured in Italian East Africa needed to be sent to a safe stronghold to be kept as prisoners of war (POWs). South Africa was the perfect destination, and the first POWs arrived in Durban, in 1941.

Despite being POWs, the Italians were treated well, with a good food diet and friendly hospitality. These factors, along with the peaceful, cheap, and sunny landscape, made it very attractive for Italians to settle down, and therefore, the Italian South African community was born. Although over 100,000 Italian POW were sent to South Africa, only a handful decided to stay. During their capture, they were given the opportunity to build chapels, churches, dams, and many more structures. Most Italian influence and architecture can be seen in the Natal and Transvaal area. Esselenpark (Railway College) is particularly notable.

Today there are roughly 77,400 South Africans of Italian descent.

=== Ethiopia ===
During the Italian occupation of Ethiopia, roughly 300,000 Italians settled in Italian East Africa (1936-1947). Over 49,000 lived in Asmara (now located in and the capital of Eritrea) in 1939 (around 10% of the city's population), and over 38,000 resided in Addis Ababa. After independence, many Italians remained for decades after receiving full pardon by Emperor Selassie, as he saw the opportunity to continue the modernization efforts of the country. However, due to the Ethiopian Civil War in 1974, nearly 22,000 Italo-Ethiopians left the country. 80 original Italian colonists remained alive in 2007, and nearly 2000 mixed descendants of Italians and Ethiopians. In the 2000s, some Italian companies returned to operate in Ethiopia, and a large number of Italian technicians and managers arrived with their families, residing mainly in the metropolitan area of the capital. 3,400 Italians still live in Ethiopia. and 1,300 British people live in Ethiopia.

=== Elsewhere in Africa ===
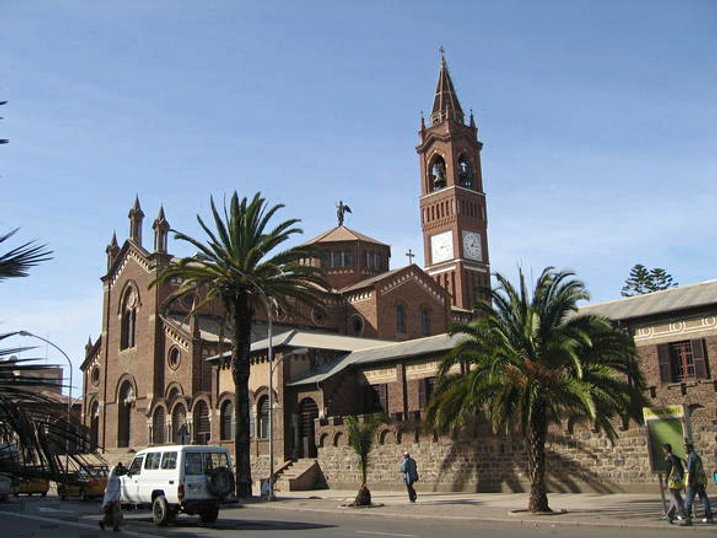
Church of Our Lady of the Rosary in Asmara, built by Italian Eritreans in 1923

The Italians had a significantly large, but very quickly diminished population in Africa. In 1926, there were 90,000 Italians in Tunisia, compared to 70,000 Frenchmen (unusual since Tunisia was a French protectorate). Former Italian communities also once thrived in the Horn of Africa, with about 50,000 Italian colonists living in Italian Eritrea in 1935, with 49,000 of them lived in Asmara, like mentioned above. The Italian Eritrean population grew from 4,000 during World War I to nearly 100,000 at the beginning of World War II. Of all the former Italian territories, Eritrea is the only one where the educated population can speak Italian, as there is 1 Italian-language school in Asmara, the Scuola Italiana di Asmara, and the Italian language is still spoken in Eritrean commerce. The size of the Italian Egyptian community had also reached around 55,000 just before World War II, forming the second-largest expatriate community in Egypt. 100,000 people in Italian Eritreans living in Eritrea have at least one Italian ancestor, accounting for 2.2% of its total population.

A few Italian colonists stayed in Portuguese colonies in Africa after World War II. As the Portuguese government had sought to enlarge the small Portuguese population through emigration from Europe, the Italian migrants gradually assimilated into the Angolan Portuguese community.

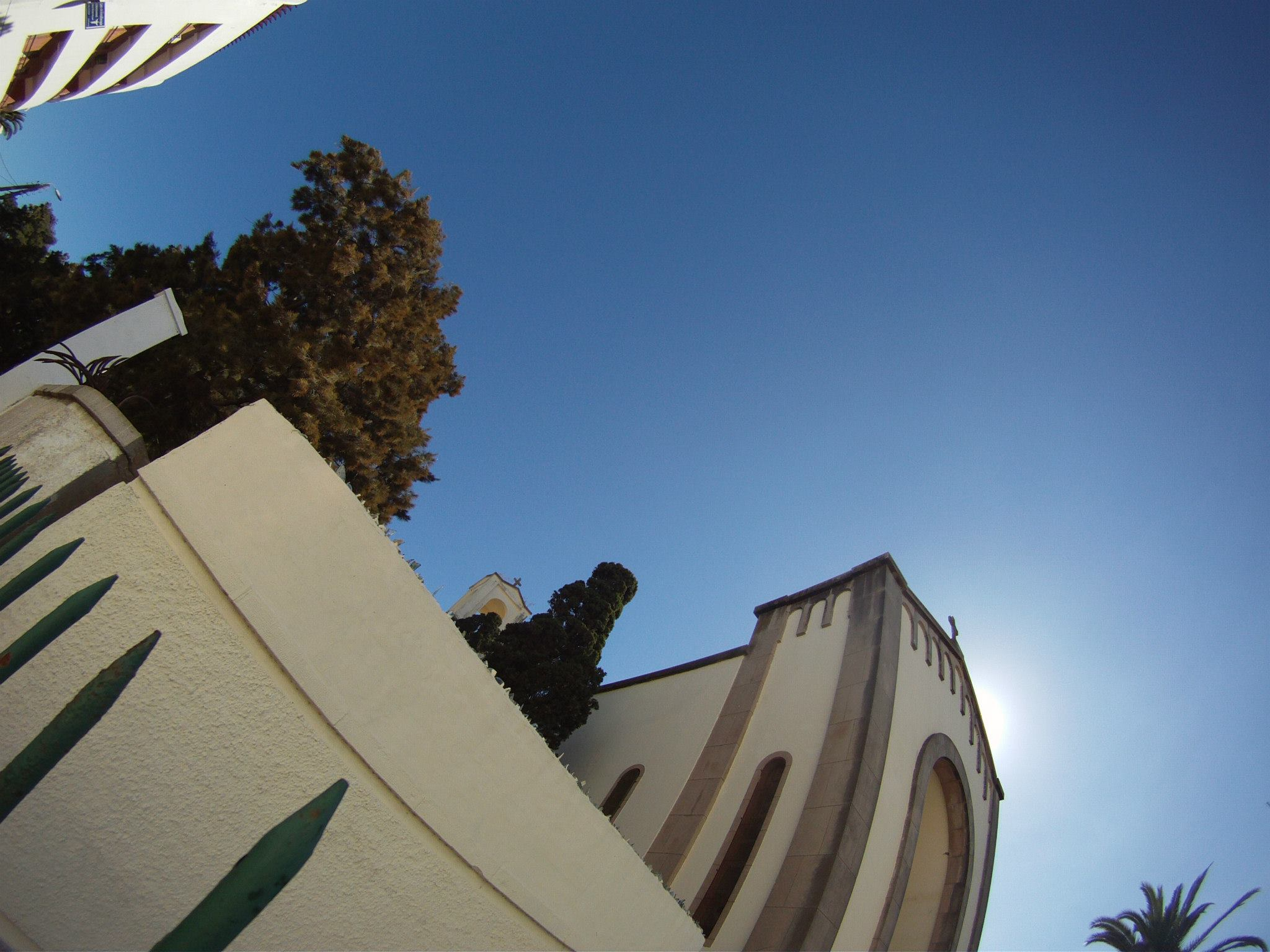
Italian Catholic church in Tangier

The first Italian presence in Morocco dates back to the times of the Italian maritime republics, when many merchants of the Republic of Venice and of the Republic of Genoa settled on the Maghreb coast. This presence lasted until the 19th century. The Italian community had a notable development in French Morocco; already in the 1913 census about 3,500 Italians were registered, almost all concentrated in Casablanca, and mostly employed as excavators and construction workers. The Italians were mainly dedicated to the trade and the Moroccan construction industry. The Italian presence in the Rif, included in Spanish Morocco, was minimal, except in Tangier, an international city, where there was an important community, as evidenced by the presence of the Italian School. A further increase of Italian immigrants in Morocco was recorded after World War I, reaching 12,000 people, who were employed among the workers and as farmers, unskilled workers, bricklayers and operators. In the 1930s, Italian-Moroccans, almost all of Sicilian origin, numbered over 15,600 and lived mainly in the Maarif district of Casablanca. With decolonization, most Italian Moroccans left Morocco for France and Spain.

== Greeks in Africa ==
=== Egypt ===
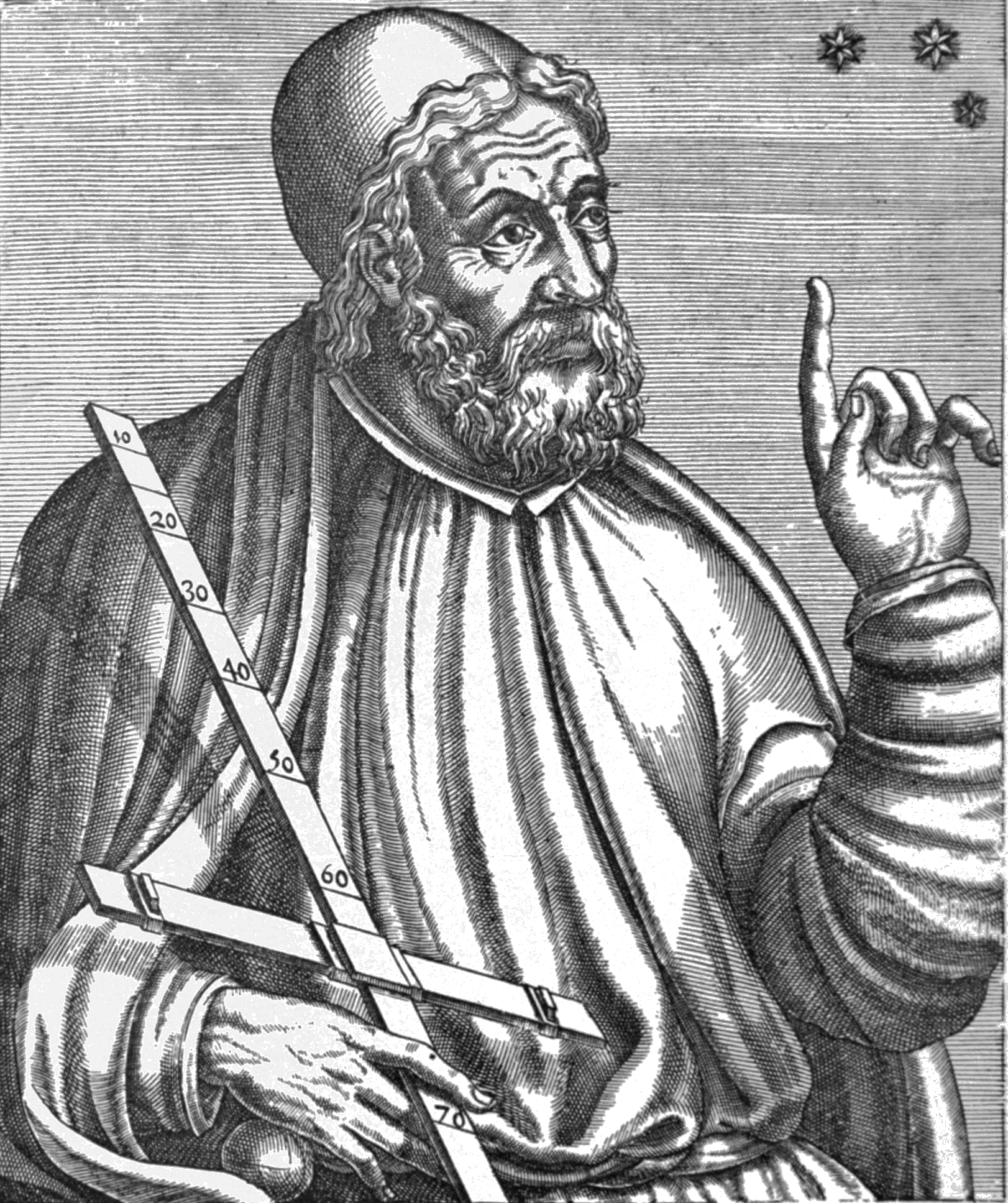
The geographer Ptolemy was a Greek born in Alexandria.

Greeks have been living in Egypt since and even before Alexander the Great conquered Egypt at an early stage of his journey of conquests. Herodotus, who visited Egypt in the 5th century BC, wrote that the Greeks were the first foreigners that ever lived in Egypt. Diodorus Siculus attested that Rhodian Actis, one of the Heliadae, built the city of Heliopolis before the cataclysm; likewise the Athenians built Sais. While all Greek cities were destroyed during the cataclysm, the Egyptian cities including Heliopolis and Sais survived.

In modern times the official 1907 census showed 62,973 Greeks living in Egypt. The expulsion of 2.5 million Greeks from Turkey saw a large number of those Greeks move to Egypt and by 1940 Greeks were numbered at around 500,000. Today the Greek community numbers officially about 3,000 people although the real number is much higher since many Greeks have changed their nationality to Egyptian. In Alexandria, apart from the patriarchate, there is a patriarchal theology school that opened recently after being closed for 480 years. Saint Nicolas church and several other buildings in Alexandria have been recently renovated by the Greek Government and the Alexander S. Onassis Foundation.

During the last decade, there has been a new interest from the Egyptian government for a diplomatic rapprochement with Greece and this has positively affected the Greek diaspora. The diaspora has received official visits of many Greek politicians. Economic relationships have been blossoming between Greece and Egypt. Egypt has been recently the centre of major Greek investments in industries such as banking, tourism, paper, and oil. In 2009, a five years cooperation memorandum was signed among the NCSR Demokritos Institute in Agia Paraskevi, Athens and the University of Alexandreia, regarding Archeometry research and contextual sectors.

=== South Africa ===
The Greeks have had a presence in South Africa since the late 19th century. After the flight of the Greeks from Egypt in reaction to Nasser's nationalization policy the Greek population of South Africa dramatically increased to around 250,000. Today the number of Greeks in South Africa is estimated between 60,000 – 120,000.

=== Zimbabwe ===
The Greek community in Zimbabwe numbered between 13,000 and 15,000 people in 1972 and once comprised Rhodesia's second largest white community after individuals of British origin. Today the Greek community in Zimbabwe numbers under 3,000. Zimbabwe currently hosts eleven Greek Orthodox churches and fifteen Greek associations and humanitarian organizations.

=== Elsewhere ===
The Greeks have a presence in a number of African countries such as Cameroon (1,200 people), Zambia (800 people), Ethiopia (500 people), Uganda (450 people), Democratic Republic of Congo (300 people), Kenya (100 families), Nigeria (300 people), Tanzania (300 people), Sudan (200 people), Botswana (200–300 people), Malawi (200 people), and Morocco (150 people).

== Germans in Africa ==
=== Namibia ===
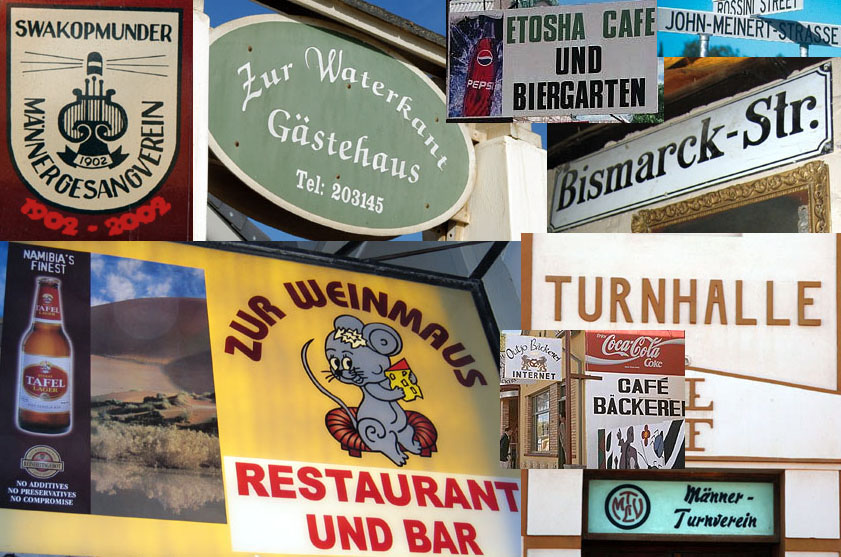
Examples of daily use of German in Namibia

Germany was late to colonize Africa (or to have an empire), mainly due to it not being a unified country until the late 19th century. However, many Germans settled in South West Africa (modern day Namibia) as well as South Africa. Those Germans who migrated to South West Africa retained German culture, religion, and even language, while those in South Africa often had to learn English or Afrikaans as a first language and adopt another culture.

Unlike other Europeans in Africa, when many African states gained independence, the Germans (along with the English and Dutch/Afrikaners) stayed in Southern Africa because they retained political dominance (now being a mandate under South African control). The country was administered as a province of South Africa during the apartheid era (though South African rule was not widely recognized internationally.) German influence in Namibia is very strong and noticeable. Because Namibia has not changed any town names since independence, many of the largest cities in the country retain their German names. These include Lüderitz, Grünau, Maltahöhe, Wasser, and even the capital city has a German name (Windhuk). In the southern Regions of Karas and especially Hardap, the vast majority of town names are German, or a mixture of German, Afrikaans and English. In the Hardap region, some 80% of colonies have a name of German origin.

Namibia is also the only nation outside Europe to have a Lutheran majority. This is due to many German missionaries during the 19th century who converted the Ovambo and Damara people to Christianity. Until 1990, German was an official language of Namibia, and is now a recognized regional language (the only one of its kind for the German language outside of Europe).

=== Tanzania ===
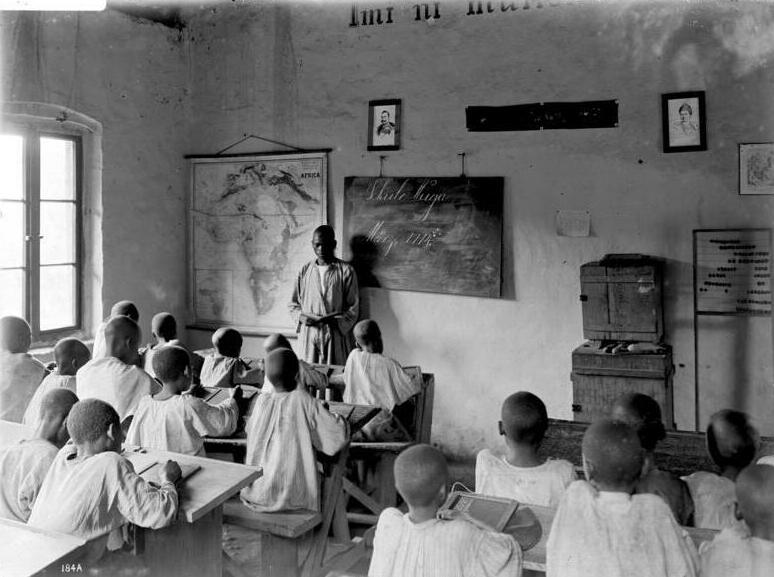
A classroom in a German East African school

When mainland Tanzania, Rwanda, and Burundi were under German control they were named German East Africa and received some migration from German communities.

A number of locations in Tanzania formerly bore German names. The city of Tabora was formerly named Weidmannsheil and Kasanga was known as Bismarckburg. Mount Kilimanjaro was known as Kilimandscharo, a German way of spelling it. Despite virtually all German names being reverted since World War I, some places still hold German names. These include the majority of Glaciers on Mount Kilimanjaro, such as Rebmann Glacier and Furtwängler Glacier.

Some colonial German-style buildings still exist in some of Tanzania's largest cities and former German strongholds, but they are in bad condition and need extensive renovation.

=== Togo ===
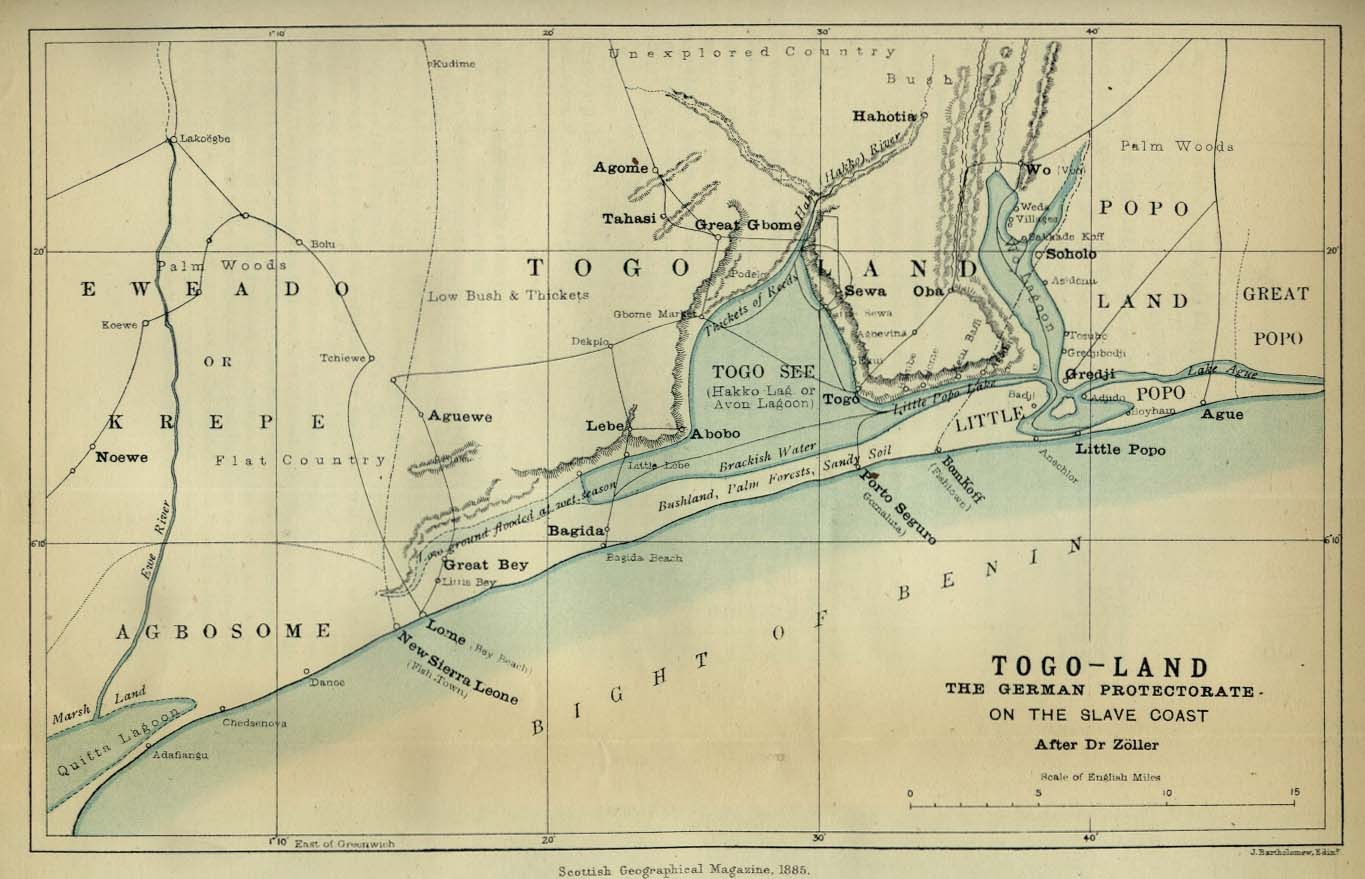
A map of Togoland in 1885, with Lomé in the south-west. Note that all land above the coast is called 'Unexplored country', despite the whole territory being under German control.

Togoland was a German colony from 1884 to 1914.

=== Cameroon ===
Kamerun was a German colony in present-day Cameroon between 1884 and 1916. During German control, few German families migrated in comparison with Germany's other colonies, but plantations, trading posts, and infrastructure projects were built to aid the growing German Empire with goods, such as bananas and important minerals. These trading posts were most abundant around the former capital city, and largest city in Cameroon: Douala.

Douala itself was known as Kamerunstadt (German for 'Cameroon City') between 1884 and 1907. Most trading took place with Hamburg and Bremen, and was later made easier by the construction of an extensive postal and telegraph system. Like all German colonies (except South West Africa), after World War I, many Germans left for Europe, America, or South Africa.

After World War I, the colony of Kamerun was split between British and French administrations. Once Germany was admitted to the League of Nations, the new colonial administrations were forced to allow German colonists and missionaries to return and repossess their land beginning in 1925. The German-run factories and plantations in Southern Cameroon employed over 25,000 Cameroonians at this time. Sentiment among native Cameroonians at the time remained overwhelmingly pro-German, which was made most evident when only 3,500 Cameroonians enlisted to fight for the British at the outbreak of World War II. By the 1930s, Germans accounted for more than 60% of the white population in British Cameroon and owned more than 300,000 acres of cocoa plantations in both the French and British Cameroons.

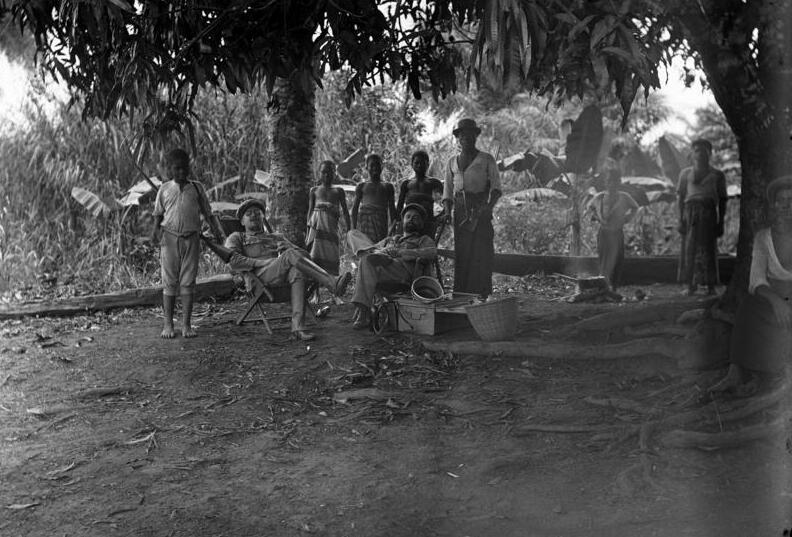
German Settlers enjoying Christmas in Kamerun

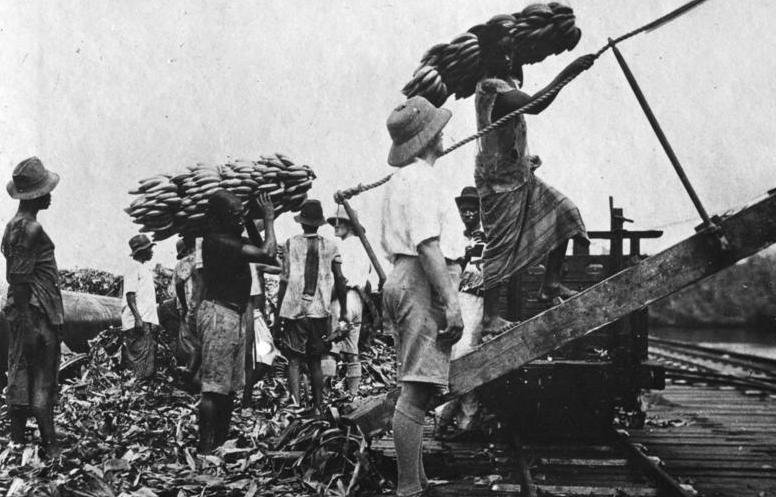
Bananas heading for Germany in 1912

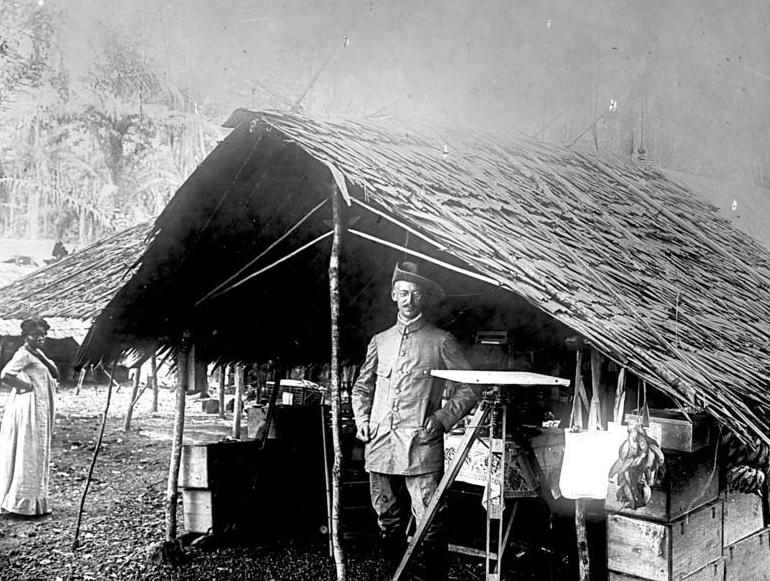
German surveyor in Kamerun, 1884

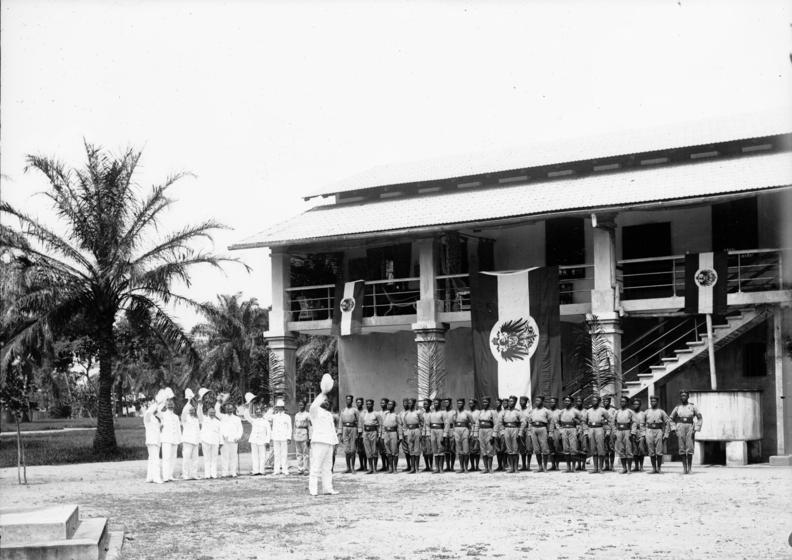
A police force on the Kaiser's birthday, 1901

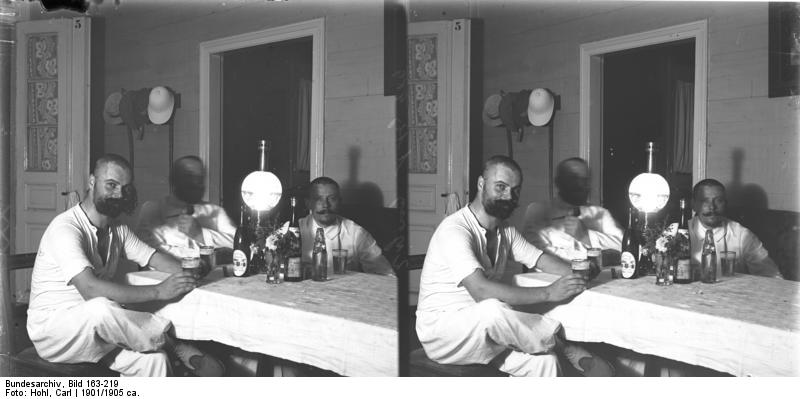
German men in Douala, Kamerun

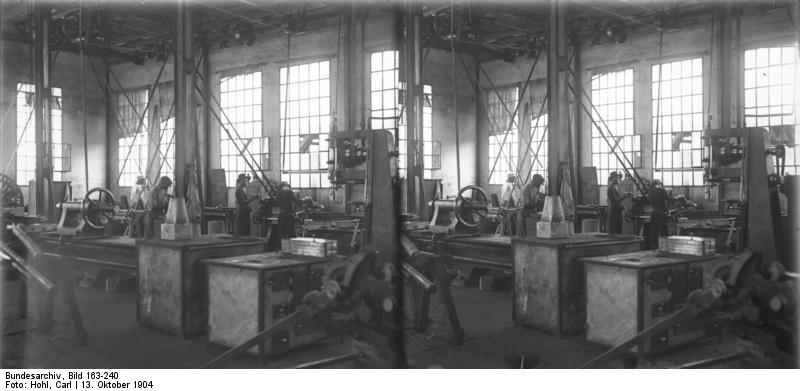
A German-built workshop in Kamerun

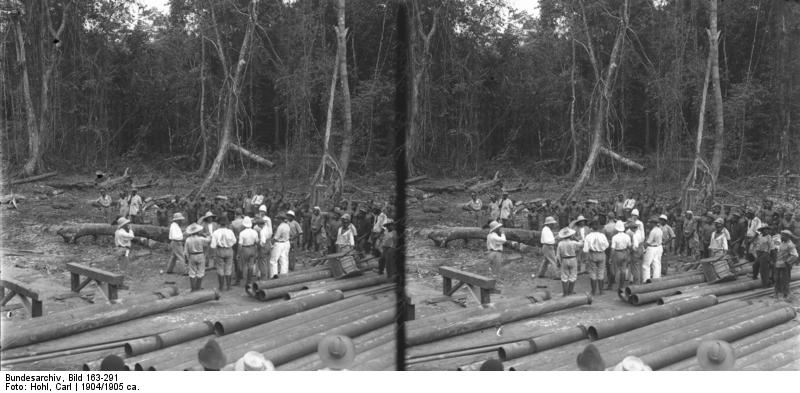
Oil in Kamerun, one of the many resources that the German Empire needed

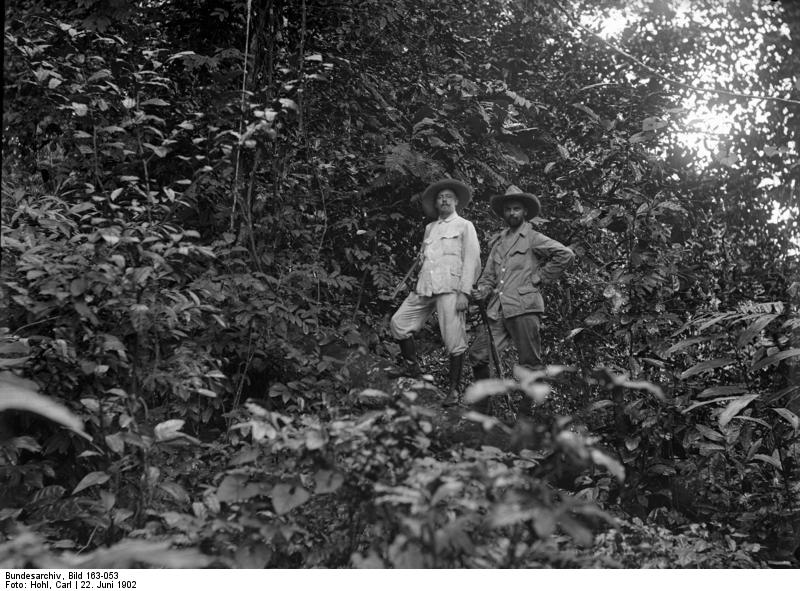
German settlers in the rainforest

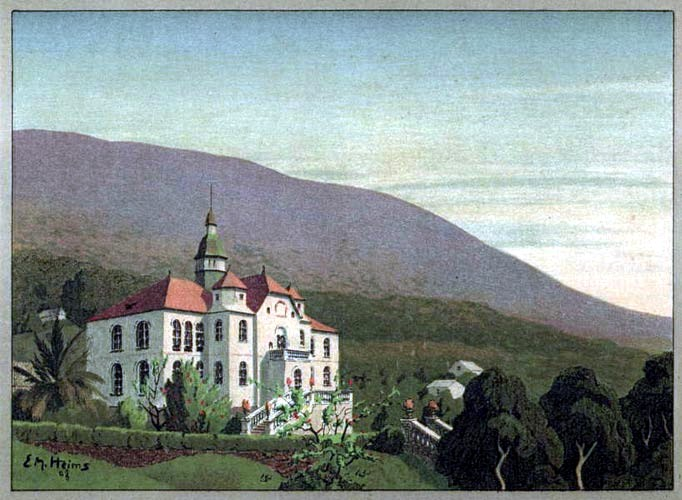
Governor's home in Buea, with Mount Cameroon in the background

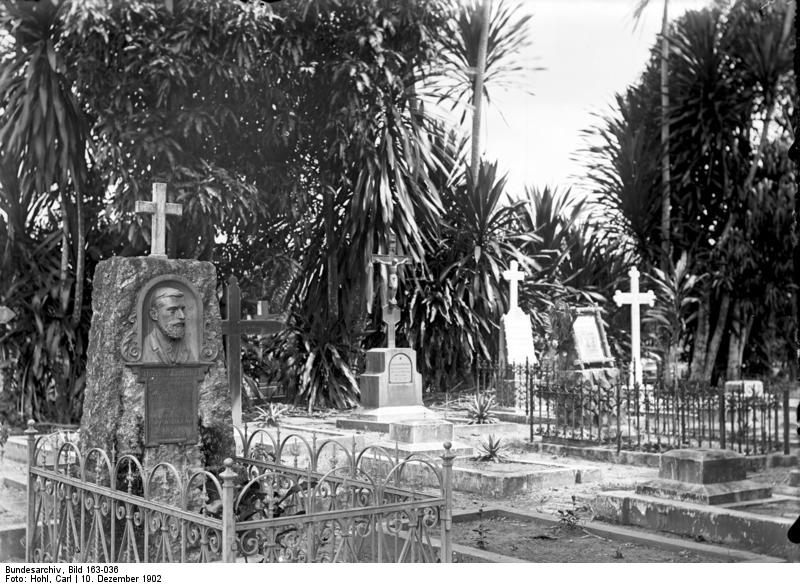
A German cemetery in Kamerun

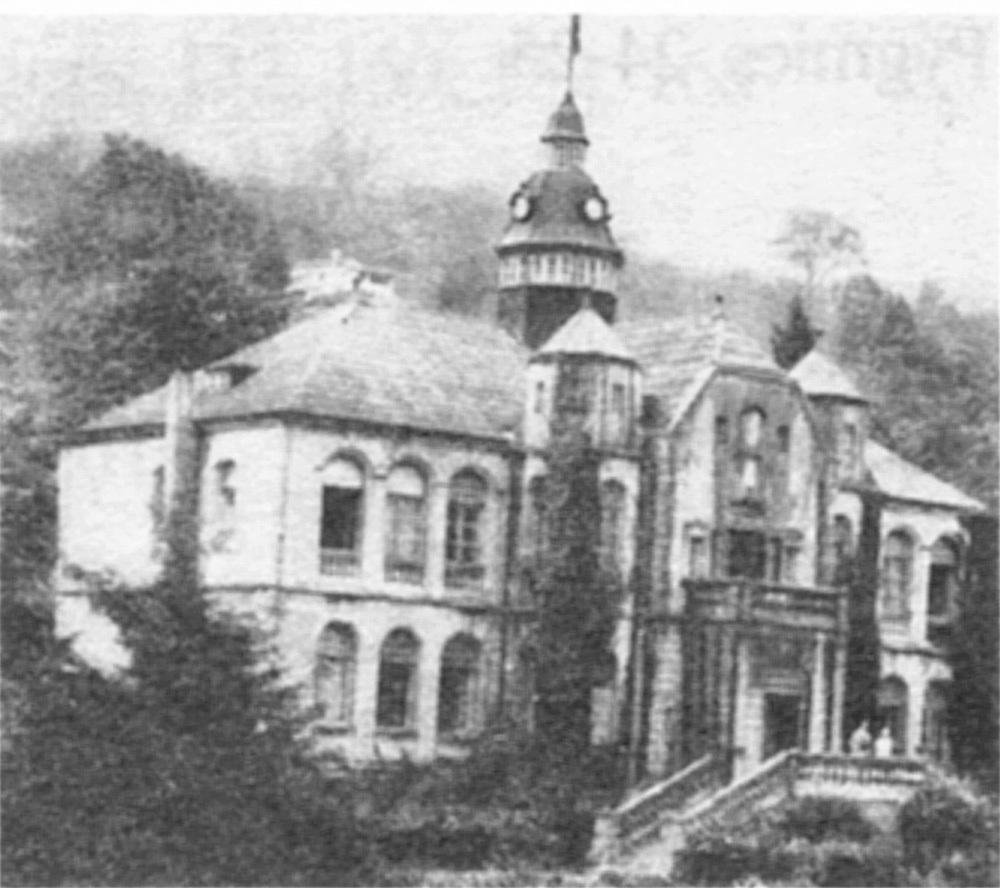
The schloss (palace) of Jesko von Puttkamer, governor of German Kamerun

The proposed flag for German Kamerun

=== Former Portuguese colonies ===
A number of German colonists stayed in Portuguese African colonies as World War II refugees when the Portuguese government tried to request Europeans of other nationalities to increase the very tiny Portuguese population and during the war, although that plan of the Portuguese government was unsuccessful. Prior to the Angolan Civil War, the German population in Benguela and Moçâmedes was very active and had a German-language school in Benguela. The German families remaining in Angola today live mainly in Luanda and Calulo.

=== South Africa ===
There is a German community within South Africa, many of whom have been absorbed into the Afrikaner community, but some still maintain a German identity. Migration to South Africa from Germany has existed since the establishment of the first refreshment station in 1652. German missionaries were present throughout the region. Under British rule, there was increased immigration from Germany with significant numbers settling in the Natal and in the Eastern Cape. Under apartheid, much of the land given to German colonists was confiscated so many dispersed throughout the country.

=== Ghana ===
There are some Germans remaining in Ghana. Most of them have ancestors from Brandenburg and Prussia.

== Spanish in Africa ==
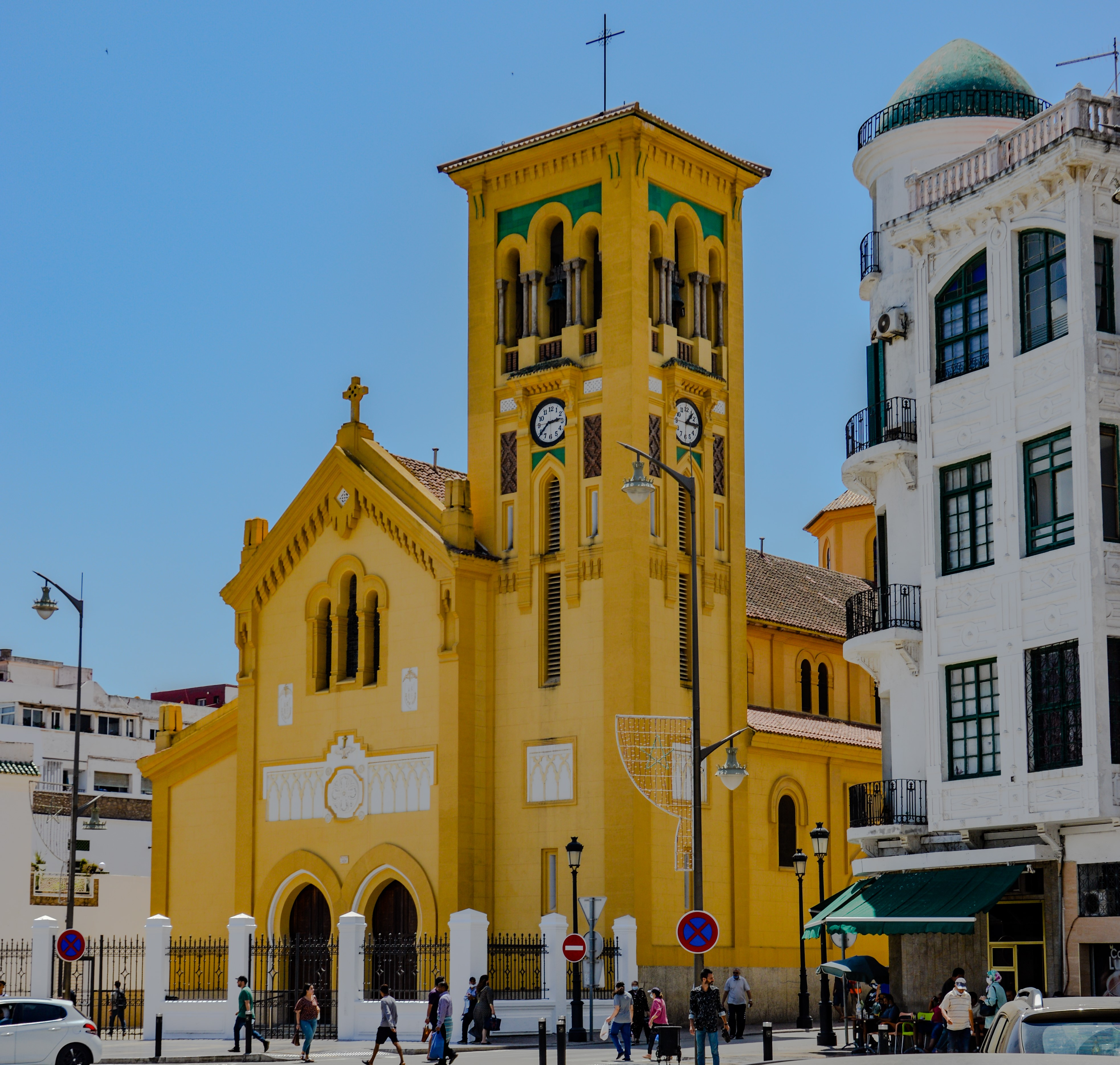
The Spanish Church (Church of Our Lady of Victory of Tétouan) in Tétouan, Morocco

The Spanish have resided in many African countries (mostly former colonies), including Equatorial Guinea, Western Sahara, South Africa, and Morocco. 94,000 Spaniards chose to go to Algeria in the last years of the 19th century; 250,000 Spaniards lived in Morocco at the beginning of the 20th century. Most Spaniards left Morocco after its independence in 1956 and their numbers were reduced to 13,000.

In 1950, Catholics in Spanish protectorate in Morocco and Tangier constitute 14.5% of the population, and the Spanish Morocco was home to 113,000 Catholic settlers. Catholics in Spanish protectorate in Morocco and Tangier were mostly of Spanish descent, and to a lesser extent of Portuguese, French and Italian ancestry.

Prior to Spain's abandoning the Western Sahara in 1975, there were over 20,000 Spanish Catholics, who formed roughly 32% of the total population before the Moroccan occupation.

=== Equatorial Guinea ===
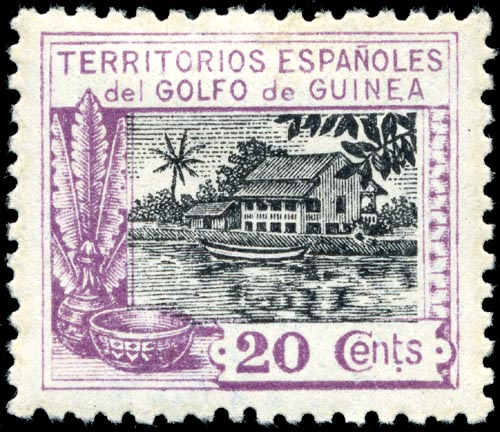
A 1924 stamp depicting a typical Spanish-owned plantation in Spanish Guinea

The Spanish have resided in Equatorial Guinea (when under Spanish rule known as Spanish Guinea) for many years and first started as temporary plantation owners originally from Valencia, before returning to Spain. Few Spaniards remained in Spanish Guinea permanently and left only after a few years. At independence in 1968 Spanish Guinea had one of the highest per capita incomes in Africa (US$332). The Spanish also helped Equatorial Guinea achieve one of the continent's highest literacy rates and developed a good network of health care facilities.

Many left Spanish Guinea when the colony gained independence in 1968. After independence, many Spanish-named cities and places in Equatorial Guinea were changed to more African names, the most obvious one being the capital city, Malabo (formerly Santa Isabel), and the island it is located on, Bioko (formerly Fernando Poo).

Despite a large loss of Spanish residents during the rule of Masie Nguema Biyogo, their numbers have somewhat increased after he was overthrown. They almost exclusively speak Spanish as their first language; French or Portuguese, which are official languages, are often spoken as second languages, sometimes alongside the indigenous Bantu languages. Their religion is almost entirely Catholic, and this can be reflected by the population, which also remains Catholic. Since the discovery of oil, and an economic 'boom', a large number of Europeans of other ancestries have also migrated the country for business and in Malabo, they are located in the western half of the city and in new housing estates.

=== Canary Islands ===
The Canary Islands are part of the Macaronesia, Atlantic islands detached from the African mainland. The Canary Islanders are a mixture of the indigenous North African proto-Berber Guanches, Spanish and Portuguese people and other Europeans, mainly from Germany, Italy and the UK, and the descendants of African slaves.

=== Plazas de soberanía ===
Spain holds the plazas de soberanía ("strongholds of sovereignty") on Northern African coast. They are small islands garrisoned by the Spanish Army and two autonomous cities: Ceuta and Melilla. About 60% of the population of Ceuta is "Christian", meaning the descendants of the Portuguese and Spanish ancestral people and recent immigrants mostly linked to the Spanish state. A similar proportion of "Christians" is present in Melilla.

=== Moriscos ===
The Moriscos (Christianized descendants of Iberian Muslims of mixed Hispano-Roman, Visigothic, Berber and Arab ancestry) were expelled from Spain between 1609 and 1614. Thousands of them settled in Muslim North Africa. Some number their descendants as high as 5 million people.

== Belgians in Africa ==
Belgian colonials and their descendants have been especially represented in Rwanda and the Democratic Republic of the Congo, although post-colonial instability in these states has led to exodus.

=== Belgian Congo ===
In the Belgian Congo, Belgium's largest overseas possession, European missionaries, corporations, and officials had entrenched a comprehensive political, social, economic, and cultural hegemony. This was disrupted as 1955 drew to a close, however, as mild proposals for a form of Congolese self-government provoked furious protests across the Belgian Congo. A Belgian-appointed study commission subsequently recommended a complicated formula which would lead to gradual self-government for the Congo by 1985, although this was opposed by the most militant nationalists, who demanded immediate and full independence.

On 5 July 1960, five days after the new Republic of the Congo gained independence from Belgium, members of the Force Publique (Dutch: Openbare Weermacht) garrison near Léopoldville/Leopoldstad mutinied. African soldiers, resentful over the fact that independence had brought little change to their status, ousted 1,000 of their Belgian officers from the command structure. The new government was slow to react, allowing a state of panic to develop among the 120,000 colonists still resident in the territory as roving bands of mutineers attacked numerous European targets, assaulting and killing with impunity. Belgium's attempt to defend her nationals with military force only aggravated the situation; within ten days of independence white civil servants were emigrating en masse. As Congo's infamous crisis developed further, the predominantly white magistrate corps also fled the growing chaos, dealing a severe blow to their nation's basic judicial apparatus – considered by several prominent observers to be "the worst catastrophe in this series of disasters".

In 1965, there remained a mere 60,000 Belgians spread throughout the Congo.

As of 2011, roughly 9,500 European-descended people live in the Congo, many of whom are of Belgian ancestry. As of 2024, 2,746 people in the Congo are Belgian citizens.

=== Flemings in Rwanda, South Africa, and the DRC ===
Many Flemish colonists in Rwanda were targeted for extermination as part of the Rwandan genocide. This seemed to be largely because Belgian colonists had offered better education and employment opportunities to Tutsi tribesmen under colonial rule than the Hutus, who controlled the government during the genocide. Many of those remaining today are of Flemish descent, and part of the large "reverse diaspora" currently occurring in Rwanda.

Radio messages broadcast by Hutu extremists advocated the killing of white Rwandans should they be of Belgian ancestry, despite the fact that Belgium itself attempted to remain neutral during the 1994 conflict. Furthermore, one of the main radio propagandists was a white Belgian man who moved to Rwanda, Georges Ruggiu.

3,000 Belgians are living in Burundi, and 14,000 Belgians are living in Burundi, DR Congo and Rwanda together.

== Norwegians in Africa ==
=== Southern Africa ===
Although Norwegians in Africa are one of the smallest immigrant communities, they are not unheard of. Emigration to South Africa from Norway in 1876–85 was dominated by emigrants from the districts of Romsdal and Sunnmøre.

One notable incident was the Debora Expedition, when a dozen families left Bergen in 1879 to establish a Norwegian colony on the Indian Ocean atoll of Aldabra (now part of Seychelles). The mission was aborted because of a lack of fresh water on the atoll, and they instead settled in Durban, with a few opting to settle in Madagascar.

The town of Marburg in the South African province of KwaZulu-Natal was founded by Norwegians in 1882. Marburg's founders were mostly from Ålesund in Sunnmøre. It was the only successful Scandinavian colony in southern Africa. Many of the original founders later left the colony, a number of them joining the other Norwegian community already in Durban and a smaller number moving on to Australia.

A number of Norwegian colonists stayed in Portuguese African colonies when the Portuguese government tried to request Europeans of other nationalities to increase the very tiny Portuguese population, although the plan was unsuccessful. They were already acculturated to the Portuguese population.

== Serbs in Africa ==
=== Southern Africa ===
Serbs and people of Serbian descent constitute a fairly large population in South Africa, accounting for 25–30,000 people, mostly residing in Gauteng. Over 22 Serbian folklore groups are active in South Africa, and participate in church-based activities. There are a number of diaspora clubs and associations, as well as several Serbian Orthodox churches in the country. The Serbian community in South Africa has existed since the 19th century, and during World War II the government of Yugoslavia sent agents to recruit Serbian immigrants, then mostly concentrated in Cape Town. In 1952, the Serbian community that left Socialist Federative Republic of Yugoslavia after World War II founded a local Saint Sava church and school municipality in Johannesburg. In 1978, a local Serbian Orthodox Church dedicated to Thomas the Apostle was built. Today, a local school teaches students Serbian language with support under the program defined by the Ministry of Education of Serbia.

Additionally, there are Serbian communities in Zambia numbering nearly 3,000 which has existed in Zambia for over six decades and Botswana. In 2009 the Rector of St. Thomas the Apostle Serbian Orthodox Church in Johannesburg visited the Serbian community of Zambia, who attend the local Greek church. The Serbian community in Botswana began construction of its first church in Gaborone in 2016.

== Hungarians in Africa ==
=== Magyarab people ===
The Magyarabs are a small community living within Nubia, along the Nile in Egypt and Sudan. They descend from Hungarians (Magyars) who intermarried with locals, and are believed to date back to the late 16th century, when Hungary and Egypt were part of the Ottoman Empire.

=== Southern Africa ===
There are also about 4,000 Hungarians living in South Africa. Tokai, a suburb of Cape Town is named after Tokaj, a range of hills in Hungary, it was originally an open area with various wine farms and smallholdings.

== Other European diaspora in Africa ==
Virtually all European ethnic groups can be found in South Africa. Several Sub-Saharan African countries have more than one million inhabitants with at least one Eurasian ancestor, like Angola, Eritrea, Ethiopia, Ghana, Madagascar, Mauritania, Mauritius, Niger, Nigeria, Somalia, South Africa and Sudan, according to DNA studies.

Armenians once numbered thousands in Ethiopia and Sudan, before civil wars, revolutions, and nationalization drove most of them out. They still have community centers and churches in these countries. Before 1952 there were around 75,000 Armenians in Egypt. Today, they number around 6,000 and live primarily in Cairo. The Armenian Apostolic Church and Coptic Orthodox Church are in communion as Oriental Orthodox churches.

There are an estimated 100,000 Europeans living in Tunisia, most are French with some Italians. Morocco has about 100,000 Europeans, most of them French with some Spanish. In Cape Verde, around 50% of the population has at least one European ancestor, resulting in many people having blond hair or blue eyes. Some 15,000 French people lived in the Ivory Coast in 2004.

Liberia was founded and settled mostly by liberated African-Americans as well as West Indians, most of whom had varying degrees of European ancestry. Americo-Liberians comprise 2.5% of Liberia’s population, numbering about 150,000 people.

== Languages ==
White Africans speak Indo-European languages as their first languages (Afrikaans, English, Portuguese, French, German, Spanish and Italian).

=== Afrikaans ===
Geographical distribution of Afrikaans in South Africa (proportion of the population that speaks Afrikaans at home): 0–20%; 20–40%; 40–60%; 60–80%; 80–100%

Afrikaans is the most common language spoken at home by white South Africans. It is spoken by roughly 60% of South Africa's, 60% of Namibia's, and about 5% of Zimbabwe's white population. In South Africa they make up a major white speaking group in all provinces except KwaZulu-Natal, where Afrikaans speakers make up 1.5% of the population. In Rhodesia (and later Zimbabwe), Afrikaans was not as common and the country was dominated by English throughout its history. There were however a few Afrikaans inhabitants, mostly from South Africa. Afrikaans was also very limited culturally in Rhodesia and so only a few Afrikaans place names existed, most notably Enkeldoorn (renamed Chivhu in 1982). Most Afrikaners in Zimbabwe have now immigrated to South Africa or European countries.

=== English ===
English is the second most spoken language among white Africans, spoken by 39% of South Africa's, 7% of Namibia's, and 90% of Zimbabwe's white population. In South Africa they remain the dominant white ethnic group in KwaZulu-Natal, while in Gauteng and the Western Cape they also contribute to a large percentage of the English-speaking population.

English is a second language of many non-British white Africans with higher education in almost all non-English-speaking African nations. Outside of South Africa, Namibia, and Zimbabwe, British White Africans make up a large minority in Zambia, Kenya, Botswana, and Swaziland, therefore growing the presence of English in these countries.

=== German ===
German is spoken by 32% of Namibia's white population (making up 2% of the Namibian population). There is also a now nearly extinct German dialect in Namibia known as Namibian Black German (or in German as Küchendeutsch or Kitchen German), and used to be spoken by black domestic servants to German colonists. However, the government has tried to lower the use of German and Afrikaans due to its colonial roots, and instead try and enforce English, the sole official language, and Bantu languages. There is also known to be a German dialect, spoken in the south-east of South Africa, known as Nataler German (German from Natal).

=== Other languages ===
Most whites in Angola and Mozambique use Portuguese as their first language. The other 1% of whites in South Africa, who do not speak Afrikaans or English, mostly speak Portuguese (from immigrant communities who come from Angola and Mozambique), or German, and Dutch (from European immigration). Equally, in Namibia, the remaining 1% of the white population speaks mostly Portuguese because of the immigration from Angola following independence of all Portuguese colonies in 1975.

Only a small white population in Libya, Tunisia, Ethiopia, Eritrea, and Somalia has the fluency of Italian, because it is no longer the official language there. Spanish is also spoken in some areas of Morocco, Western Sahara, Equatorial Guinea, as well as in those territories that form part of Spain such as the Canary Islands and the autonomous cities of Ceuta and Melilla. Very few White Africans speak Bantu languages at home, but still a small percentage of white Africans speak Bantu languages as second languages.

The Greek language has long existed on the continent since antiquity. In South Africa the population estimates vary with the Greek government reporting that roughly 50,000 Greeks lived in the country in 2012. The South African constitution and Pan South African Language Board seeks to promote and respect the language. Zimbabwe also once held a large Greek-speaking community and there is still a Greek school. This is also the case in South Africa. The language was also commonly spoken among Greeks in Egypt in both the ancient era and more recent times. There is a continued presence of the Greek language because of the small Greek community in the country as well as interest among cultural institutions.

== Sport ==
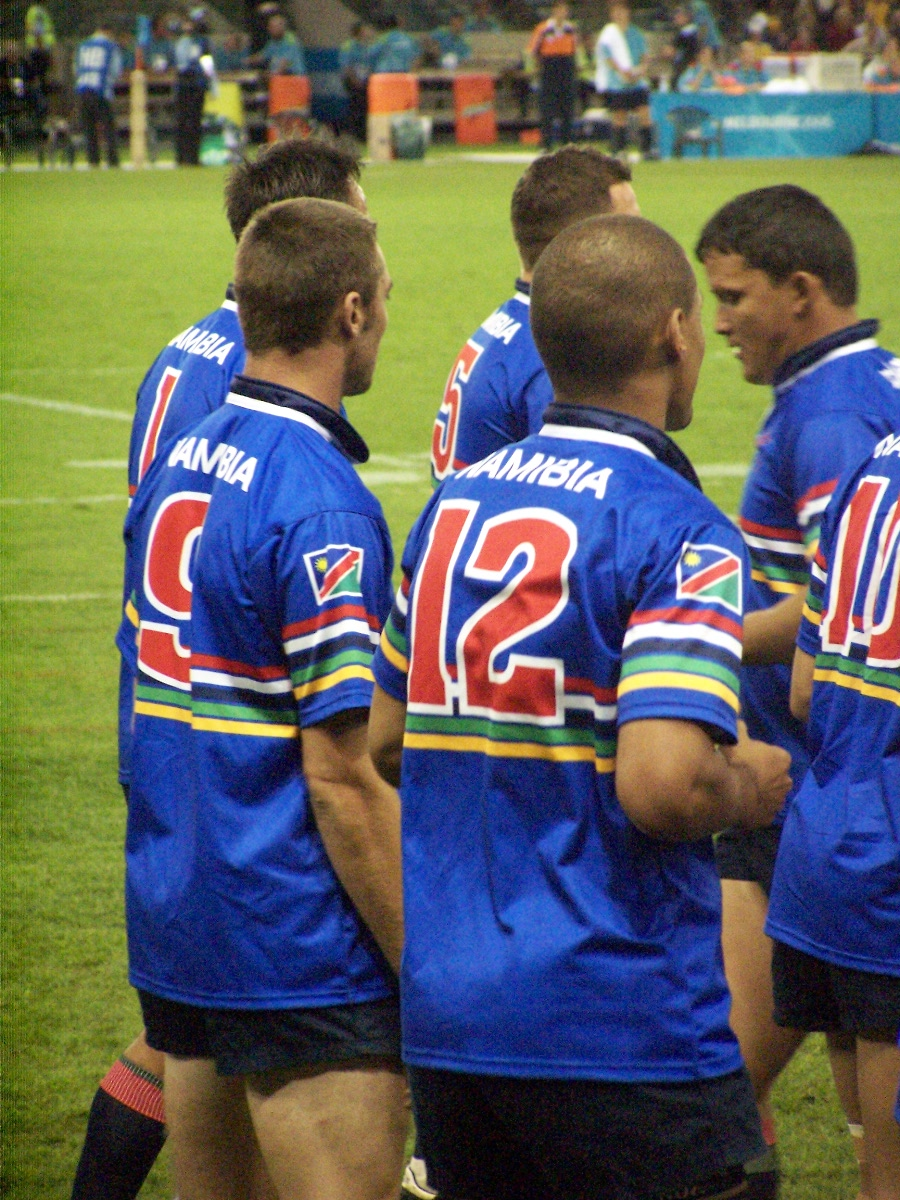
Namibia Rugby Team 7s team warming up at the Telstra Dome

The Namibia National Rugby team is largely white.

Many European sports have become popular in Africa after the arrival of Europeans on the continent. Football was first introduced in the 19th century by British colonists in South Africa in 1862. The sport was quickly spread throughout the continent by missionaries, explorers, and other Europeans on the continent. French colonists in Algeria were the first to introduce formalized clubs on the continent beginning with Club Athlétique d'Oran in 1897. The sport continues to be popular amongst Portuguese South Africans who founded the Vasco de Gama Football Club.

Cricket was introduced by British serviceman shortly after the takeover of the Cape Colony from the Dutch. The first known match in South Africa took place in 1808. The sport continues to be popular amongst White Africans of British descent. Since the end of apartheid the sport has seen increased popularity with Afrikaners. Cricket was also played by Europeans in other countries on that are members of the commonwealth. The first recorded match of cricket in Zimbabwe took place in 1890. Following from this point the sport continued to grow with the arrival of more European colonists. The sport continued to be dominated by Europeans throughout much of the 20th century, and in 1983 they successfully defeated Australia in a stunning victory.

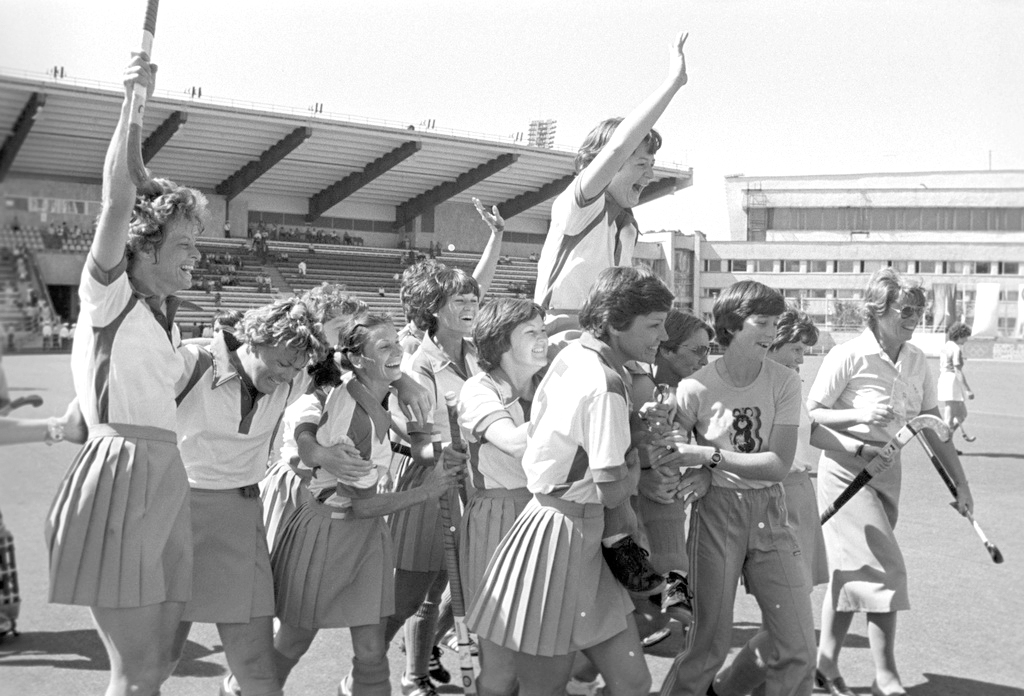
The Zimbabwean women's field hockey team that won gold at the 1980 Olympics

Field hockey is also popular amongst White Africans. In South Africa the majority of players at the Olympic level are of European descent. Similarly the Zimbabwean field hockey team famous for its 1980 gold medal match was historically dominated by white Africans. The sport has a long history on the continent, and its modern iteration was first introduced by European colonists.

Similarly to cricket, football, and field hockey; rugby was first introduced to the continent by the British. The sport was initially played in 1861 at Diocesan College but it quickly spread to the local population. The sport became popular among White Afrikaners after the first club outside of Cape Town had been created being in Stellenbosch. The expansion of European colonisation on the Cape towards the interior continued to increase the sports popularity.

Competitive swimming is also popular amongst white Africans. Such swimmers include Kirsty Coventry of Zimbabwe, and Jason Dunford of Kenya.

== See also ==
- Afro-European
- Asian Africans
- List of White Africans
- Muzungu
- White Aethiopians
- Languages of Africa
- White demographic decline

Diaspora

- White people in Zambia
- White Namibians
- White Congolese
- White Ethiopians
