= Christian de Graaff =

Botswana politician (1950s-2024)

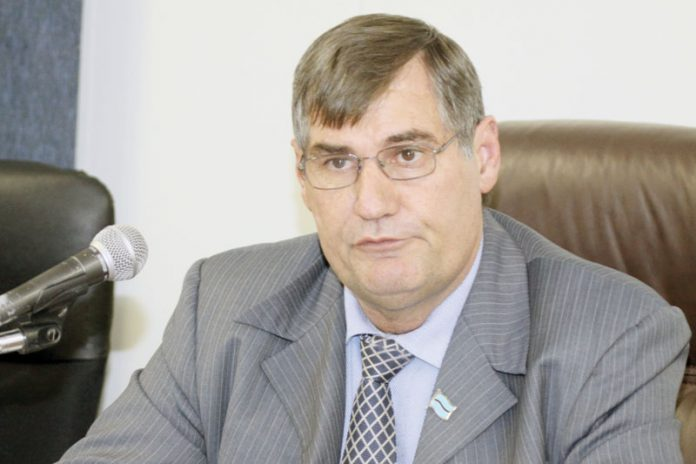

Minister of Agriculture
- In office 2011 – April 2015
- President: Ian Khama
- Preceded by: O. S. Molebatsi
- Succeeded by: Patrick Pule Ralotsia

Member of Parliament for Ghanzi South
- In office May 2007 – August 2014
- Preceded by: Brampie De Graaf

Personal details
- Born: 1953 Ghanzi, Bechuanaland Protectorate (now Botswana)
- Died: 9 November 2025 (aged 71–72) Cape Town, Western Cape, South Africa
- Party: Botswana Democratic Party
- Profession: Farmer, politician

Christian de Graaff (1953—9 November 2025) was the Minister of Agriculture of Botswana from 2011 to 2015 and was Member of Parliament for the Ghanzi South from 2007–2014. He was an ethnic Afrikaner from Ghanzi, which has historically had a large Boer population.

De Graaff died on 9 November 2025 following a suspected suicide attempt the previous month.
