= German diaspora =

German emigrants and their descendants

Total population
- c. 142.5 million (Germany: 71,347,057)

Regions with significant populations
- United States, Brazil, Argentina, France, Colombia, Canada, Mexico, Uruguay, Australia, Venezuela, Switzerland, United Kingdom, Belgium, Chile, Hungary, Paraguay, and Austria
- United States: 40,218,028
- Brazil: 5–12 million
- Argentina: 4.1 million
- Canada: 3.5 million
- Colombia: 1.5 million
- South Africa: 1.2 million
- Australia: 1 million
- France: 649,000
- Chile: 500,000
- Russia: 402,000
- Netherlands: 368,512
- Italy: 314,604
- Switzerland: 301,000
- Paraguay: 300,000
- United Kingdom: 273,654
- Peru: 240,000
- Bolivia: 237,000
- Kazakhstan: 207,000
- Austria: 200,000
- Hungary: 176,000
- Mexico: 175,000
- Spain: 154,000

The German diaspora consists of both German citizens who have emigrated recently from Germany, and groups living outside of Central Europe, who are seen as having German heritage. The second of these categories includes groups whose forbears were German speakers, but did not necessarily live in Germany, who are therefore often "German" in a sociolinguistic sense rather than a national one. They can descend from migrant groups who lived in diverse regions with different cultural practices or languages.

== Terminology ==
Volksdeutsche ("ethnic Germans") is a historical term which arose in the early 20th century and was used by the Nazis for groups who were seen as ethnically German, although they had no German citizenship, and lived outside of Nazi Germany. During World War II, Hitler forbade the use of the term because it was being used in a derogatory way against the many ethnic Germans in the SS. It is used by many historians who either deliberately or innocently are unaware of its Nazi history.

Auslandsdeutsche (adj. auslandsdeutsch) is a concept that connotes German citizens, regardless of which ethnicity, living abroad, or alternatively ethnic Germans entering Germany from abroad. Today, this means a citizen of Germany living more or less permanently in another country (including expatriates such as long-term academic exchange lecturers and the like), who are allowed to vote in the Republic's elections, but who usually do not pay taxes to Germany but in their resident states. In a looser but still valid sense, and in general discourse, the word is frequently used in lieu of the ideologically tainted term Volksdeutsche, denoting persons living abroad without German citizenship but defining themselves as Germans (culturally or ethnically speaking).

== Distribution ==
Ethnic Germans are a minority group in many countries. The following sections briefly detail the historical and present distribution of ethnic Germans by region, but generally exclude modern expatriates, who have a presence in the United States, Scandinavia and major urban areas worldwide. People of partial German ancestry form an important minority group in several countries, including the United States (roughly 11.8% of the population), Canada (roughly 10% of the population), Brazil (roughly 10 % of the population), Australia (roughly 5% of the population), Argentina (roughly 10% of the population), Chile (roughly 6% of the population), South Africa (roughly 3% of the population), Namibia and in central and eastern Europe—(Poland, Hungary, Romania, and Russia).

Distribution of German citizens and people claiming German ancestry (figures are only estimates and actual population could be higher, because of misleadingly formulated questions in censuses in countries like Poland, and other different factors, f.e. related to participant in a census):

Country	German ancestry	German citizens	Comments
United States	46,882,727 (2012) (Note: This is an American Community Survey estimate, not a United States census number.)	132,000 (2019)	See German American, the largest German population outside Germany.
Brazil	15,000,000 (2011) to 20,000,000 (2000)	44,000	See German Brazilian, the second largest German population outside Germany.
Argentina	4,100,000	10,000	See German Argentines
Canada	3,500,000(2021) (Note: Includes Volga Germans, German Swiss, Mennonites, and Baltic Germans.)	146,000	See German Canadian
Colombia	1,500,000	9,688	See German Colombians
South Africa	1,200,000 (2009) (Note: Afrikaners are predominantly of Dutch, but also of German and English ancestries.)	17,000	See Afrikaners and German South African.
Australia	1,026,138 (2021)	107,940	See German Australian.
France	1,000,000 (2010) (Note: This number represents native Alsatian speakers.)	130,000	See German French Alsace and Lorraine. See also: Germans in France See also: France-Germany relations.
Chile	1,000,000	8,515	See German Chilean. See also: German colonization of Valdivia, Osorno and Llanquihue
Paraguay	450,000 (2005)	30,000	See German Paraguayan.
Switzerland	see note (Note: Depends on definition; see Swiss people.)	450,000	See German Swiss and Swiss people.
Russia	394,138 (2010) (Note: The majority of German Russians came from former Prussia.)	142,000	See German Russian (e.g. Volga Germans, Caucasus Germans, Black Sea Germans and Crimea Germans).
Bolivia	375,000 (2014)		See German Bolivian.
Netherlands	372,720 (2013)	79,470	
Italy	314,604 (2011) (Note: This number counts only Germans in South Tyrol.)	35,000	
United Kingdom	273,654 (2011) (Note: This figure includes children born to British Military personnel serving on British Military bases in Germany)	92,000	See German Briton.
Uruguay	250,000 (2014)	6,000	See German Uruguayan.
Peru	240,000		See German Peruvian.
Kazakhstan	178,409 (2009)		See German Kazakhstani.
Hungary	131,951 (2011)	178,000	see German Hungarian.
Austria	Depends on definition; see Austrians.	170,475	
Poland	148,000 (2011)	120,000	See German Pole.
Spain	138,917 (2014)	112,000	
Turkey		115,958 (2024)	
Sweden	115,550 (2013)	20,000	
Israel		100,000	See Sarona (colony), German Colony, Haifa and German Colony, Jerusalem.
Mexico	75,000 (2010)		See German Mexican.
Belgium	73,000 (2008) (Note: Approximately 73,000 people constitute the German-speaking Community of Belgium.)	29,324	See German Belgian.
Romania	c. 22,900 (as per the 2021 Romanian census)	34,071 (according to Eurostat)	See German Romanian (e.g. Transylvanian Saxons, Banat Swabians, Sathmar Swabians, Bukovina Germans, or Zipser Germans).
Ukraine	33,302 (2001)		See Germans in Ukraine, Black Sea Germans and Crimea Germans.
Namibia	30,000 (2013)		See German Namibian.
Dominican Republic	25,000	1,792 (2012)	
Norway	25,000 (2012)	10,000	See German Norwegian.
Czech Republic	18,772 (2011)	21,267	See German Czech and Sudeten Germans.
Portugal	Unknown	20,500 (2022)	In addition, around 400 Germans have acquired Portuguese citizenship since 2008.
Greece		15,498	See German Greek.
Guyana	13,000	15,000	See German Guyanese.
Denmark	15,000	15,000	See North Schleswig Germans.
New Zealand	12,810 (2013)		See German New Zealander.
Cuba	12,387		See German Cuban.
India	~11,000		See German Indian.
Luxembourg	Depends on definition; see Luxembourgers.	12,000	
Ireland	10,000 (2006)	11,305	
Belize	10,865 (2010)		See Mennonites in Belize.
Costa Rica	10,000		See German Costa Rican.
Guatemala	500,000	7,000–10,000 (2010)	See German Guatemalan.
Slovakia	5,000–10,000		See Carpathian Germans and Zipser Germans.
Finland	8,894 (2019)	4,102 (2018)	See German Finn.
Kyrgyzstan	8,563 (2014)		See German Kyrgyzstani.
South Korea		10,763 (2024)	See German South Korean.
Philippines	6,400 (2000)		See German Filipino.
Latvia	4,975 (2014)		See German Latvian.
Serbia	4,064 (2011)	850 (2016)	See German Serbian.
Uzbekistan	3,945		See German Uzbekistani.
Croatia	2,965 (2011)		See German Croatian.
Lithuania	2,418 (2011)		See German Lithuanian.
Estonia	1,544 (2011)		See German Estonian.
Iceland	842 (2013)		See German Icelander.
Montenegro	131	752	See German Montenegrin.
Jamaica	Unknown	300	See German Jamaican.
Liechtenstein	Depends on definition; see Liechtensteiners.		
Nicaragua	Unknown		See German Nicaraguan.
Venezuela			See German Venezuelan.

=== Europe ===
==== Alpine nations ====
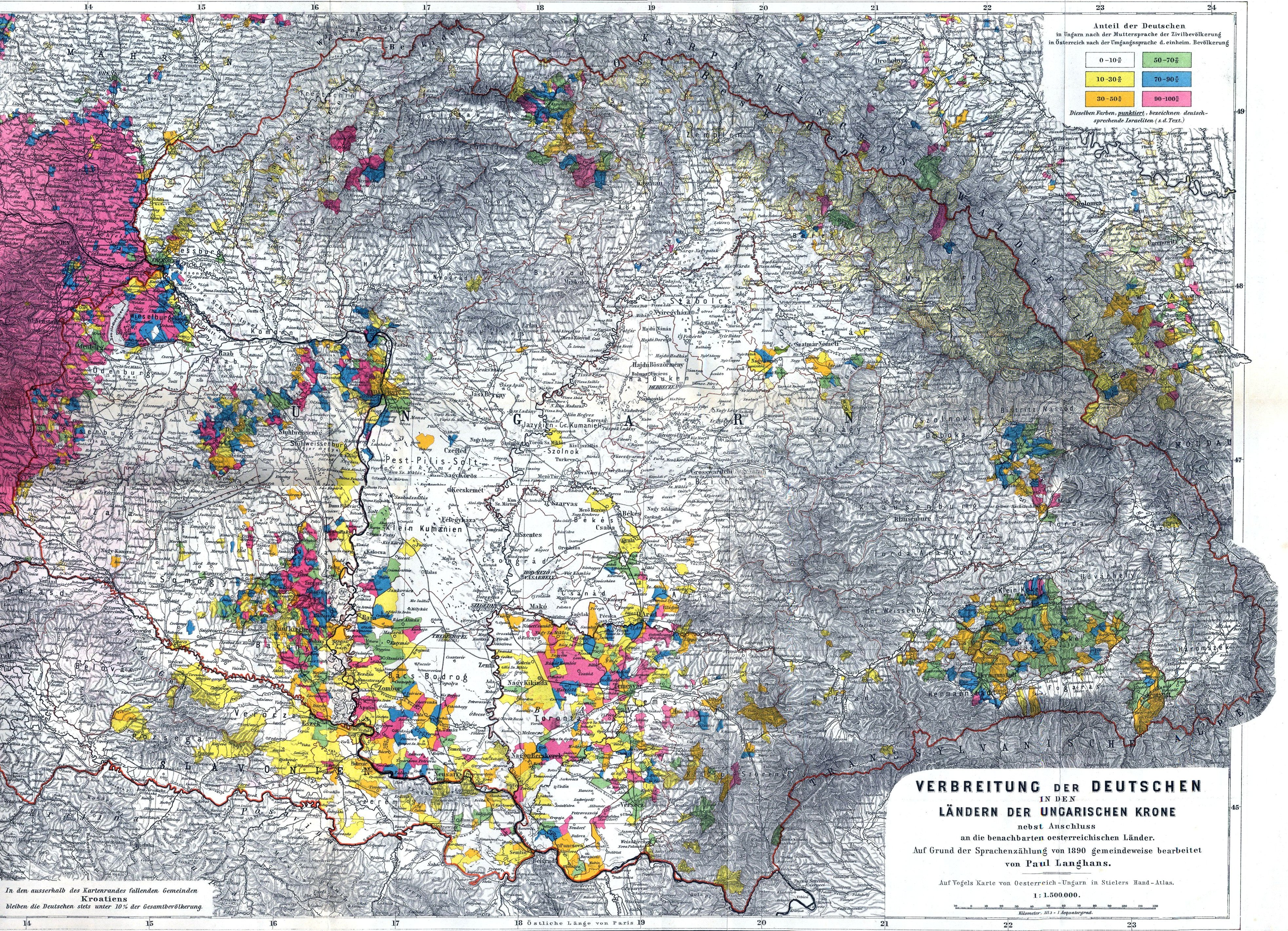
Ethnic Germans in Hungary and parts of adjacent Austrian territories, census 1890

Austria, Switzerland, and Liechtenstein each have a German-speaking majority, though the vast majority of the population do not identify themselves as German anymore. Austrians historically were identified as and considered themselves Germans until after the defeat of Nazi Germany and the end of World War II. Post-1945 a broader Austrian national identity began to emerge, and over 90% of the Austrians now see themselves as an independent nation.

==== East-Central Europe ====
Aside from the Germans who migrated to other parts of Europe, the German diaspora also covered the Eastern and Central European states such as Romania, Croatia, Hungary, Poland, the Czech Republic, and Slovakia, along with several post-Soviet states. There has been a continued historical presence of Germans in these regions due to the interrelated processes of conquest and colonization as well as migration and border changes. During the periods of colonization, for instance, there was an influx of Germans who came to Bohemia and parts of Romania as colonizers. Settlements due to border changes were largely 20th century developments caused by the new political order after the two world wars.

==== Belgium ====
In Belgium, there is an ethnic German minority. It is the majority in its region of 71,000 inhabitants. Ethnologue puts the national total of German speakers at 150,000, not including Limburgish and Luxembourgish.

==== Czech Republic and Slovakia ====
Before World War II, some 30% of the population in Czechia were ethnic Germans, and in the border regions and certain other areas they were in the majority. There are about 21,000 Germans in the Czech Republic (number of Czechs who have at least partly German ancestry probably runs into the hundreds of thousands). Their number has been consistently decreasing since World War II. According to the 2011 census, there remain 11 municipalities and settlements in Czech Republic with more than 6% Germans.

The situation in Slovakia was different from that in Czech Republic, in that the number of Germans was considerably lower and that the Germans from Slovakia were almost completely evacuated to German states as the Soviet army was moving west through Slovakia, and only a fraction of those who returned to Slovakia after the end of the war were deported with the Germans from the Czech lands.

==== Denmark ====
In Denmark, the part of Schleswig that is now South Jutland County (or Northern Schleswig) is inhabited by about 12,000–20,000 ethnic Germans They speak mainly Standard German and South Jutlandic. A few speak Schleswigsch, a Northern Low Saxon dialect.

==== France ====
There are over 100,000 German nationals residing in France. The exact number is not known; some statistics indicate more than 300,000 Germans in France, but they are not officially sanctioned. There, the Germans live mainly in the northeastern area of France, i.e., in regions close to the Franco-German border (i.e. Alsace), and the island of Corsica.

==== Hungary ====
Prior to World War II, approximately 1.5 million Danube Swabians lived in Hungary, Romania, and Yugoslavia. Today, the German minority in Hungary have minority rights, organisations, schools and local councils, but spontaneous assimilation is well under way. Many of the deportees visited their old homes after the fall of the Iron Curtain in 1990. Around 178,000 Germans live in Hungary.

==== Italy ====
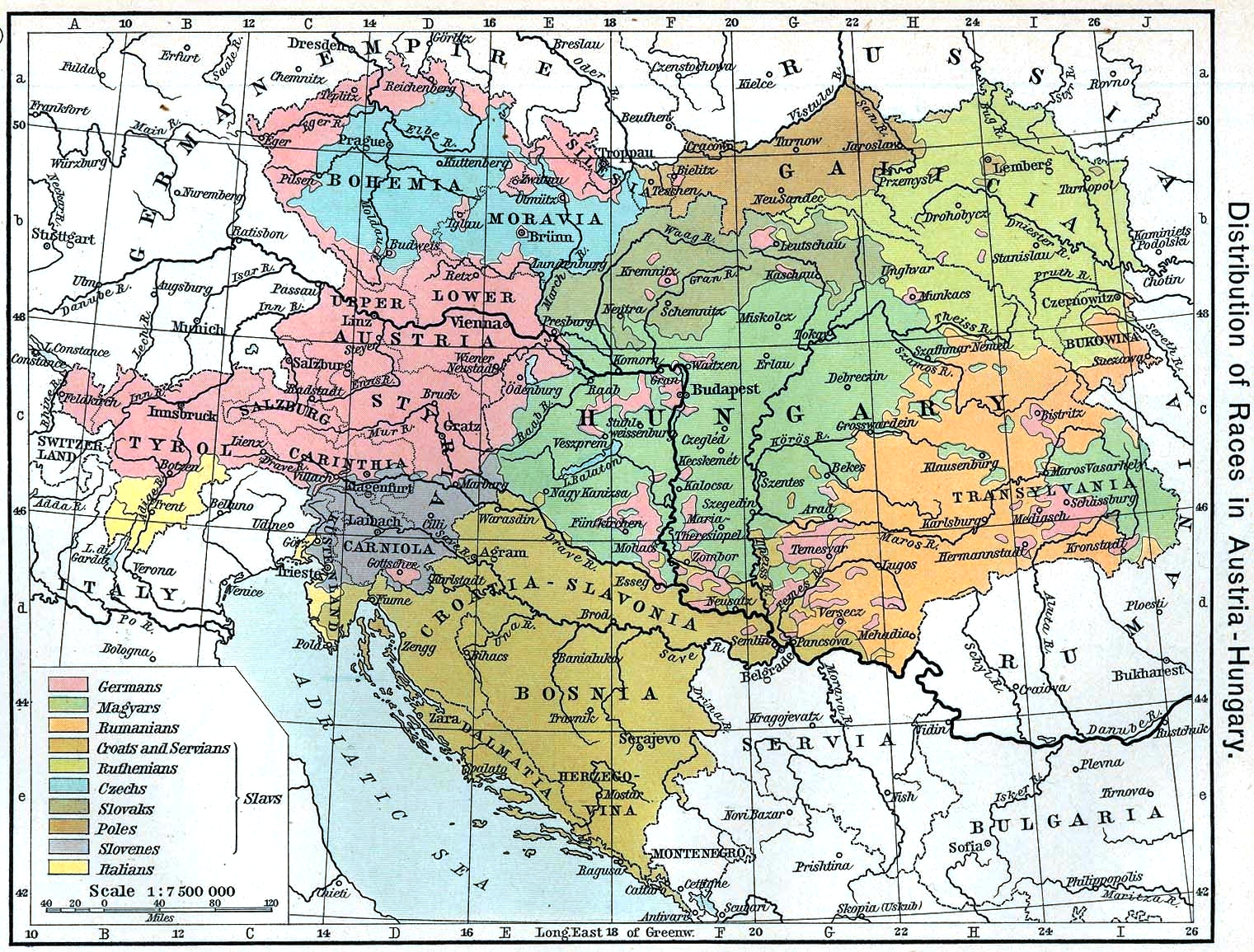
Map of Austria-Hungary in 1911, showing areas inhabited by ethnic Germans in pink

There are smaller, unique populations of Germans who arrived so long ago that their dialect retains many archaic features heard nowhere else: the Cimbrians are concentrated in various communities in the Carnic Alps, north of Verona, and especially in the Sugana Valley on the high plateau northwest of Vicenza in the Veneto region; the Walsers, who originated in the Swiss Wallis, live in the provinces of Aostatal, Vercelli, and Verbano-Cusio-Ossola; the Mòchenos live in the Fersina Valley. Smaller German-speaking communities also exist in the Friuli-Venezia Giulia region: the Carinthians in the Canale Valley (municipalities of Tarvisio, Malborghetto Valbruna and Pontebba) and the Zahren and Timau Germans in Carnia.

Contrarily to the before-mentioned minorities, the German-speaking population of the province of South Tyrol cannot be categorized as "ethnic German" according to the definition of this article, but as Austrian minority. However, as Austrians saw themselves as ethnic Germans until the end of World War II, they can technically also be called Germans. The province was part of the Austrian County of Tyrol before the 1919 dissolution of the Austro-Hungarian Empire. South Tyroleans were part of the over 3 million German speaking Austrians who in 1918 found themselves living outside of the newborn Austrian Republic as minorities in the newly formed or enlarged respective states of Czechoslovakia, Romania, Yugoslavia, Hungary and Italy. Their dialect is Austro-Bavarian German. Both standard German and dialect are used in schooling and media. German enjoys co-official status with the national language of Italian throughout this region.

Germans have been present in the Iglesiente mining region in the south west of Sardinia since the 13th century. Successively since 1850 groups of specialised workers from Styria, Austria, followed by German miners from Freiburg settled in the same area. Some Germans influenced building and toponym is still visible in this area.

==== Norway ====
In Norway, there are 27,770 Germans making them the ninth largest ethnic minority in the country, thus constituting 0.52% of Norway's total population, and 2.94% of all foreign residents in Norway. Immigration from Germany to Norway has occurred since the Middle Ages. There have been many Germans who migrated to Bergen during the Middle Ages and also during Norway's union with Denmark. During the Union with Denmark, a lot of German miners migrated to the town of Kongsberg. As of 2020, there are 1,446 Germans in the city of Bergen, making up 0.51% of the total population, and in the town of Kongsberg there are 114 Germans, making up 0.41% of the total population respectively. The city with the biggest population of Germans is Oslo. 3,743 Germans live in the city, thereby making up 0.55% of the total population. Germany is also the country that sends the most foreign exchange students to Norway, in 2016, 1,570 exchange students came to Norway from Germany.

==== Poland ====
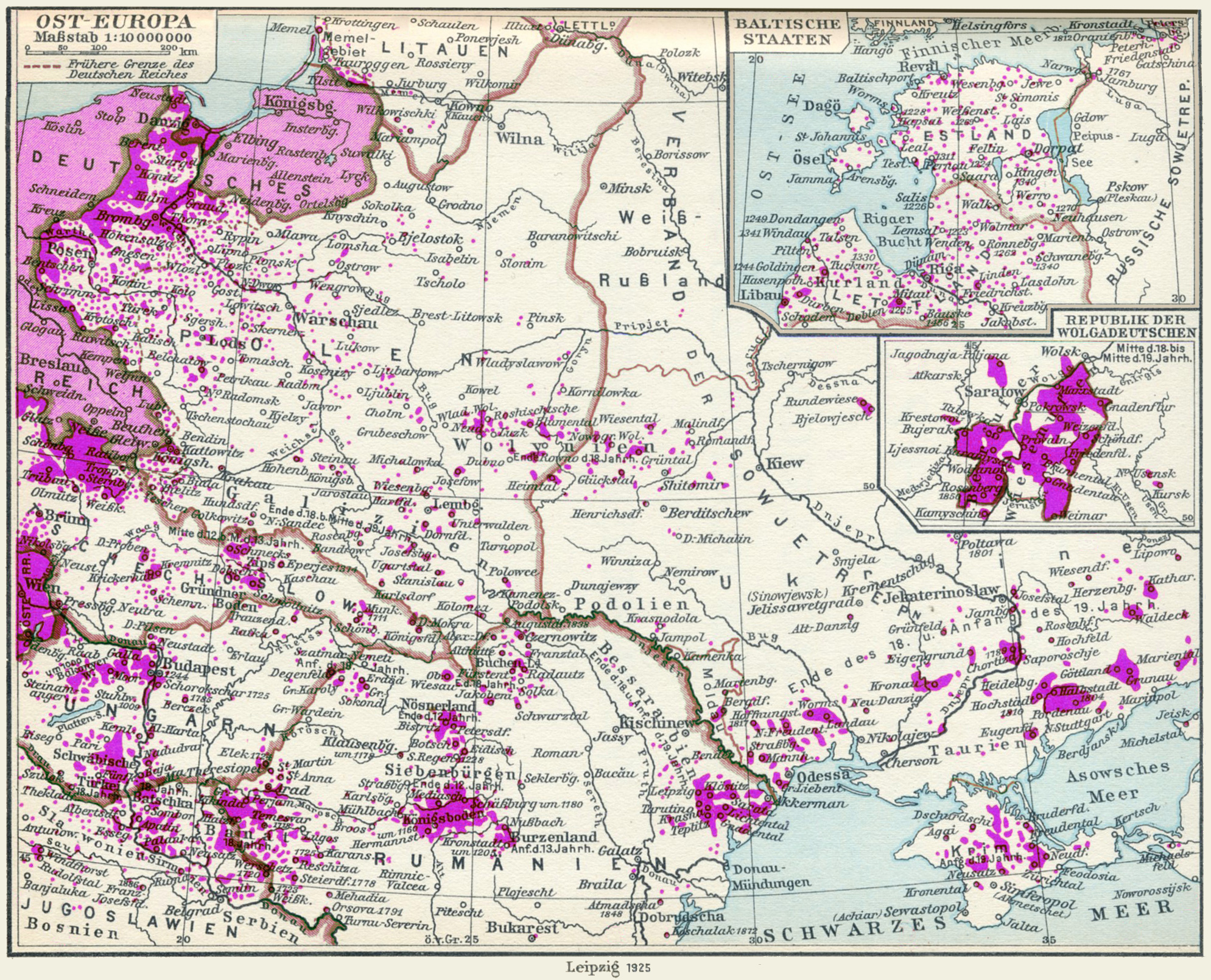
German minority in Poland, 1925

The remaining German minority in Poland (109,000 people were registered in the 2011 census) enjoys minority rights according to Polish minority law. There are German speakers throughout Poland, and most of the Germans live in the Opole Voivodeship in Silesia. Bilingual signs are posted in some towns of the region. In addition, there are bilingual schools and German can be used instead of Polish in dealings with officials in several towns.

==== Portugal ====
As of December 2022, there are 20,500 German nationals residing in Portugal. This number only include foreign nationals and thus excludes German citizens who have acquired Portuguese citizenship (around 400 people since 2008), as well as Portuguese people of German descent.

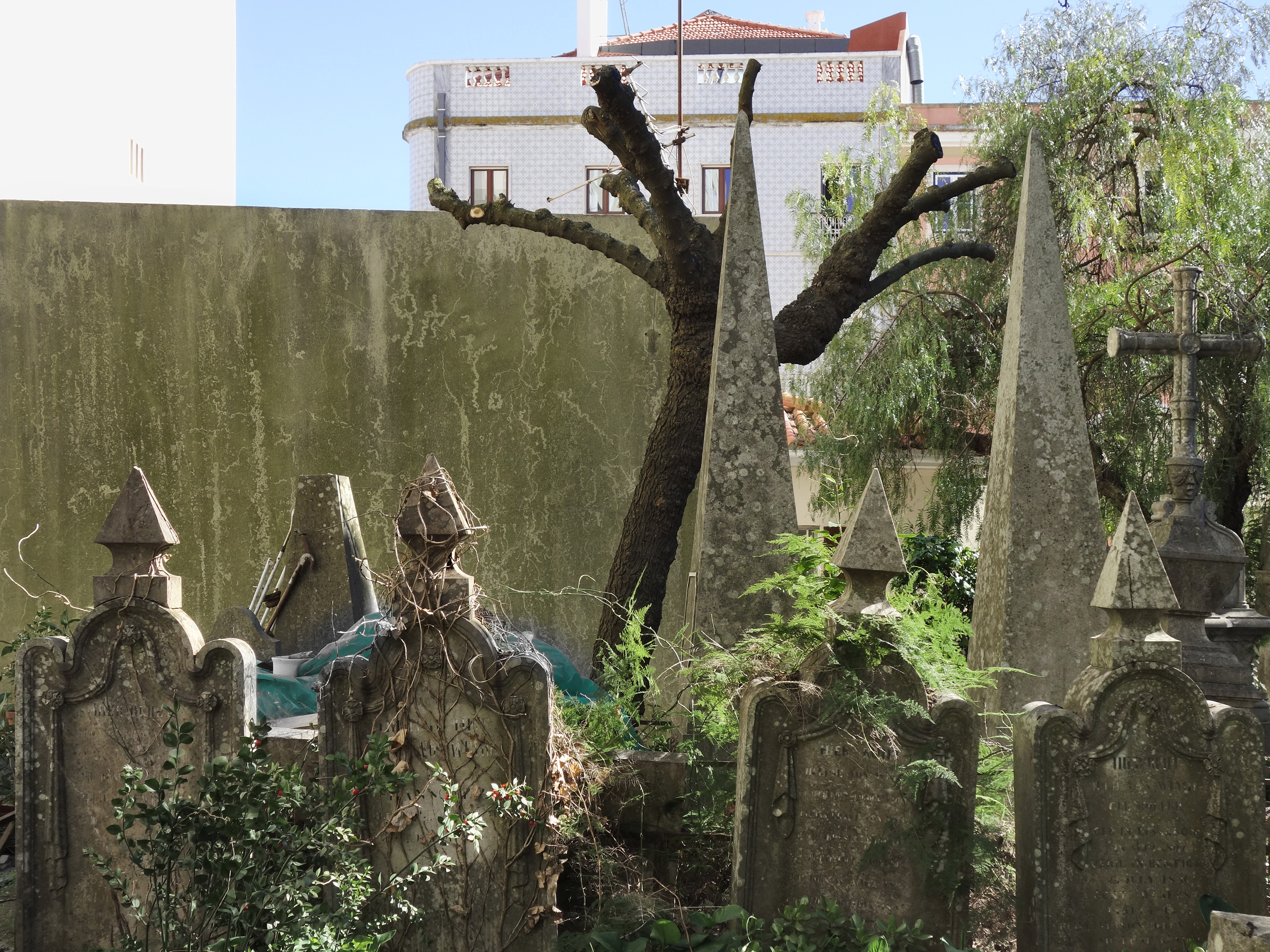
German cemetery in Campo de Ourique

Around 6,000 Germans live in the municipalities of Lisbon, Oeiras, Sintra or Cascais, in the Portuguese Riviera. On the other hand, around 5,000 Germans live in the southern region of Algarve. The German community is especially noticeable in Lisbon and Porto. Each city hosts a German Evangelical Church, a German school and offers German libraries. There is also a German church as well as a German school in Algarve while Madeira hosts a German Evangelical Church. Lisbon also hosts a Catholic German Church and a German cemetery since 1821. Many Luso-Germans have acquired fame throughout the years. Individuals of the community include Alfredo Keil (1850–1907), composer of A Portuguesa, the Portuguese national anthem, archaeologist Virgínia Rau (1907–1973), banker and industrialist António Champalimaud (1918–2004), architect Francisco Keil do Amaral (1910–1975) and former prime minister Ernesto Hintze Ribeiro (1849–1907). Contemporary figures of German descent include football player Diego Moreira, Eurovision song contest winner Salvador Sobral, surfer Nic von Rupp, actresses Catarina Wallenstein and Vera Kolodzig, and tennis player Maria João Koehler. Amongst the most notable Luso-Germans there is undoubtedly João Frederico Ludovice, who was commissioned the project for the Mafra National Palace in 1711.

==== Romania ====
As of 2022, according to the Romanian Census, there were circa 22,900 ethnic Germans recorded in Romania.

Since the High Middle Ages, the territory of present-day Romania has been continuously inhabited by German-speaking groups, firstly by Transylvanian Saxons then, gradually, by other immigrant groups of ethnic German origin. They are all politically represented by the Democratic Forum of Germans in Romania (FDGR/DFDR).

==== Spain ====
There are 138,917 residents of German descent living in Spain in 2014, and 112,000 German citizens. Settlement of German-speaking settlers began during Middle Ages, an example is the Preysler family, with ancestors moved to Spain from Austria and was involved in the trading of Austrian bred horses being brought to Spain in the mid-19th century.

Before World War II broke out, Sudeten German Prince Maximilian Eugene of Hohenlohe-Langenburg decided to take refuge in Spain. Similarly, after the war, all of his assets were confiscated through the Beneš Decrees. However, the fortune of his wife's family prevented him from falling out of favor. In Spain, one of his sons, Prince Alfonso, founded the Marbella Club Hotel, thus beginning the Marbella Golden Mile, which he catapulted as a destination for international luxury tourism, which since then has generated great wealth for Spain.

==== Sweden ====
During the 11th century, Sweden was visited by missionaries from Germany. During the Middle Ages, Hanseatic merchants had a great influence on Swedish trade and also the Swedish language. According to a survey, the proportion of German loanwords in Swedish is 24–30 percent (slightly depending on how you calculate). During the period of great power, a number of German congregations were formed in Sweden. Including Karlskrona German parish, which then became part of Karlskrona Admiralty parish. Today, there are two more active German congregations in Sweden. They are part of the parishes of the Church of Sweden, the German Christinae parish and the German St. Gertrude's parish consists of German citizens or Swedes of German origin.

In connection with the two world wars, several German children of war came to Sweden. Between the late 1940s and early 1990s, many East German refugees also came to Sweden. On 31 December 2014, there were 49,359 people in Sweden who were born in Germany, of whom 23,195 were men (47.0%) and 26,164 women (53.0%). The corresponding figure for 31 December 2000 was 38,155, of which 16,965 men (44.5%) and 21,190 women (55.5%). There were 28,172 people in Sweden with German citizenship. In 2019, according to Statistics Sweden, German immigrants together with the Chinese were the most highly educated who migrate to Sweden, with a proportion of 70 per cent who are highly educated, which is well above the average for Sweden's population which is 30 per cent. Around 29,505 German Citizens living in Sweden in 2020.

==== United Kingdom ====
In the United Kingdom, a German-Briton ethnic group of around 300,000 exists. Some are descended from 19th-century immigrants. Others are 20th-century immigrants and their descendants, and others are World War II prisoners of war held in Great Britain who decided to stay there. Others arrived as spouses of English soldiers from post-war marriages in Germany, when the British were occupying forces. Many of the more recent immigrants have settled in the London and southeast part of England, in particular, Richmond (South West London).

Due to Brexit, the number of Germans in the UK has declined significantly. In 2021, there were only 135,000 Germans in the UK.

=== Africa ===
==== Namibia ====
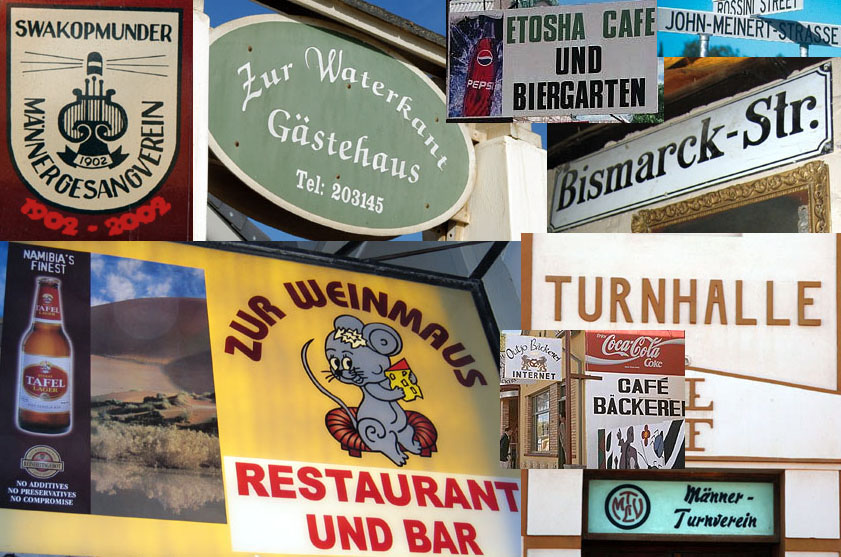
Examples of German language signage in Namibia

Germany was not as involved in colonizing Africa as other major European powers of the 20th century, and lost its overseas colonies, including German East Africa and German South West Africa, after World War I. Similarly to those in Latin America, the Germans in Africa tended to isolate themselves and were more self-sufficient than other Europeans. In Namibia there are 30,000 ethnic Germans, though it is estimated that only a third of those retain the language. Most German-speakers live in the capital, Windhoek, and in smaller towns such as Swakopmund and Lüderitz, where German architecture is highly visible.

==== South Africa ====
In South Africa, a number of Afrikaners and Boers are of partial German ancestry, being the descendants of German immigrants who intermarried with Dutch settlers and adopted Afrikaans as their mother tongue. Professor JA Heese in his book Die Herkoms van die Afrikaner (The Origins of Afrikaners) claims the modern Afrikaners (who total around 3.5 million) have 34.4% German ancestry.

Germans also emigrated to South Africa during the 1850s and 1860s, and settled in the Eastern Cape area around Stutterheim, and in Kwazulu-Natal in the Wartburg area, where there is still a large German-speaking community. Mostly originating from different waves of immigration during the 19th and 20th centuries, an estimated 12,000 people speak German or a German variety as a first language in South Africa. Germans settled quite extensively in South Africa, with many Calvinists immigrating from Northern Europe. Later on, more Germans settled in the KwaZulu-Natal and elsewhere. Here, one of the largest communities are the speakers of "Nataler Deutsch", a variety of Low German, who are concentrated in and around Wartburg. German is slowly disappearing elsewhere, but a number of communities still have a large number of speakers and some even have German language schools. Around 17,000 German Nationals lived in South Africa in 2020.

=== North America ===
Counties where German ancestry (light blue) is the plurality in the United States, 2000

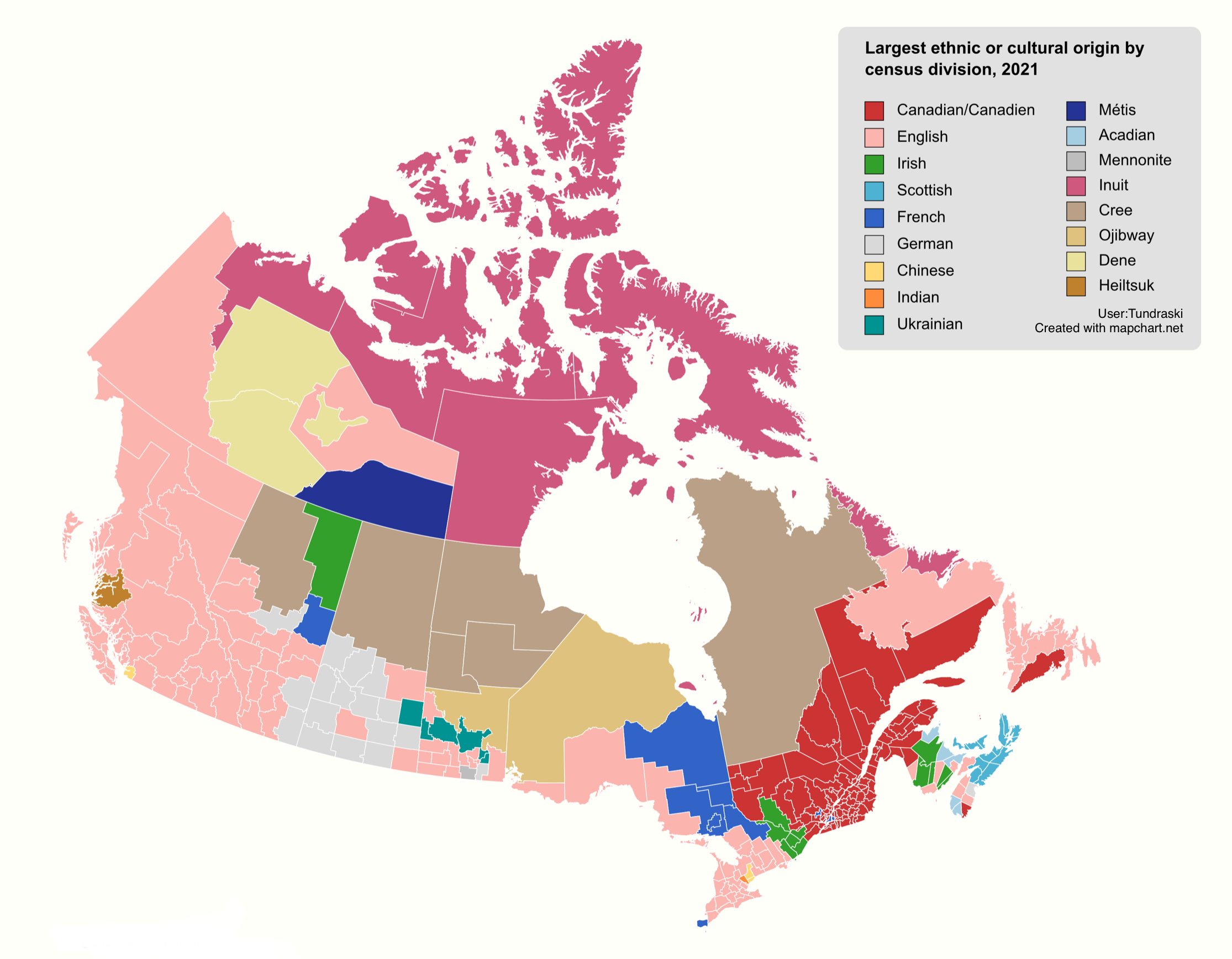
People who have self-identified as having German ancestors are the plurality in many parts of the Prairie provinces (areas coloured in grey).

In the United States are ca. 160,000 German Citizens Registered.

- Belize: 5,763 Mennonite Low-German speakers.
- Canada (3.3 million, 9,6% of the population), see also German Canadians.
- Mexico: See German immigration to Mexico, 22% of Mennonites also speak Low German which is not Standard German but derived from Old Saxon, 30% speak Spanish, 5% speak English and 5% speak Russian as a second language. Sources estimate that there are around 15,000 German citizens and Mexicans of German-citizen origin account for about 75,000 today. Also of note, the 'Colegio Alemán Alexander von Humboldt', or Alexander von Humboldt school in Mexico City is the largest German school outside Germany.
- In the United States, "German" has been the largest self-identified ancestry group since 1990. There are around 50 million Americans of at least partial German ancestry in the United States, or 17% of the U.S. population, the country's largest self-reported ancestral group. including various groups such as the Pennsylvania Dutch. Of these, 23 million are of German ancestry alone ("single ancestry"), and another 27 million are of partial German ancestry, making them the largest group in the United States, followed by the Irish. Of those who claim partial ancestry, 22 million identify their primary ancestry ("first ancestry") as German. The 22 million Americans of primarily German ancestry are by far the largest part of the German diaspora, a figure equal to over a quarter of the population of Germany itself. Germans form just under half the population in the Upper Midwest.
- Central America: In 1940, there were 16,000 Germans living in Central America; half of them in Guatemala, and most of the remainder were established in Costa Rica and a few in Nicaragua.

=== South America ===
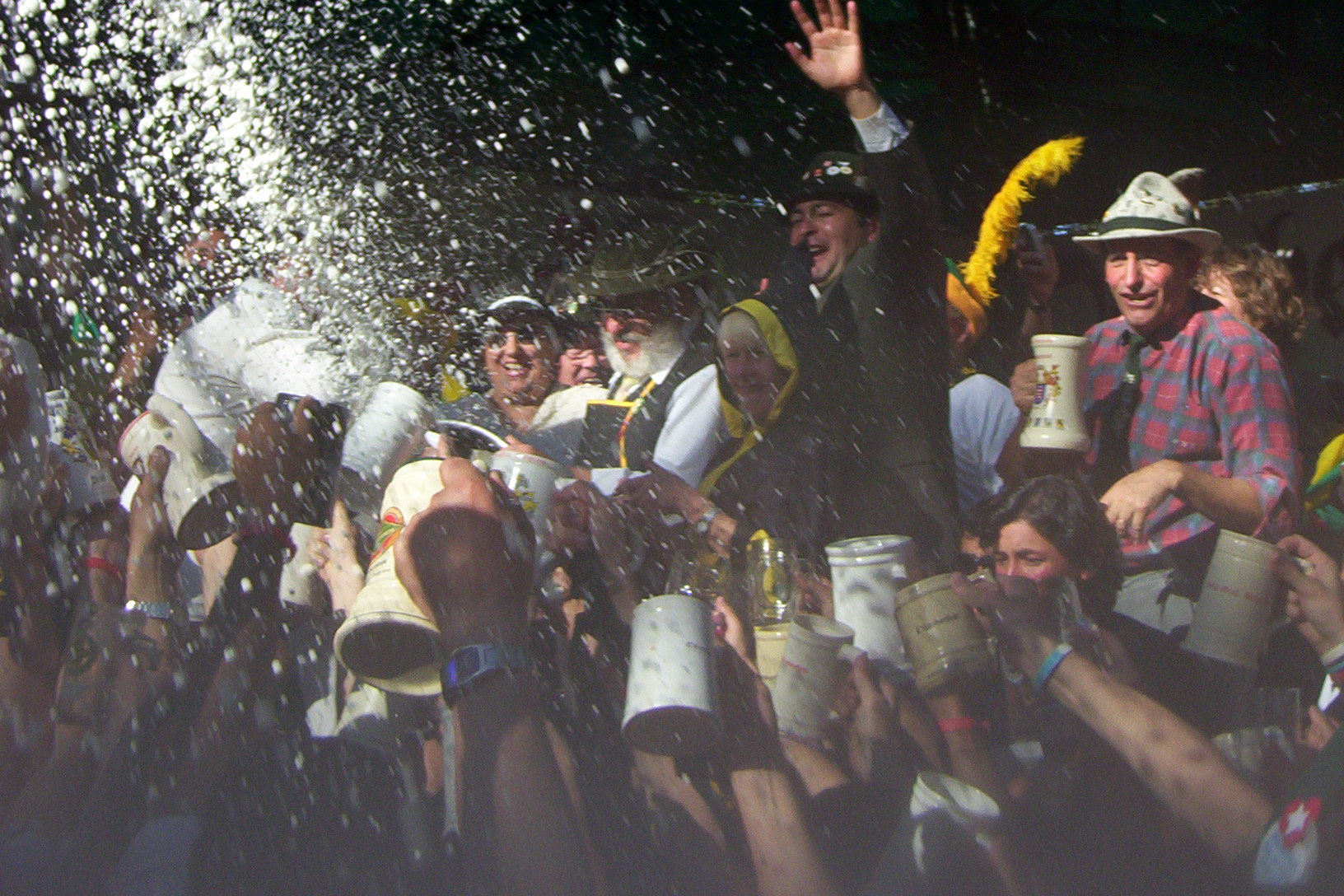
German Argentines celebrate Oktoberfest in Villa General Belgrano.

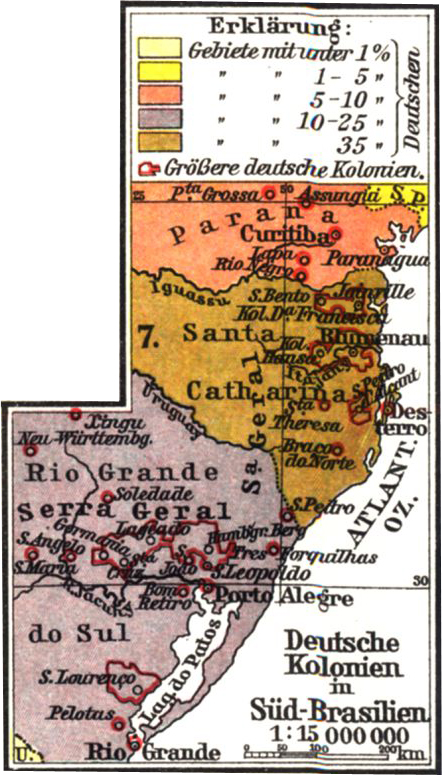
German population in Southern Brazil: Less than 1% of population (Uruguay) Between 1 – 5% of population (State of São Paulo) Between 5 – 10% of population (State of Paraná) Between 10 – 25% of population (State of Rio Grande do Sul) Around 35% of population (State of Santa Catarina)

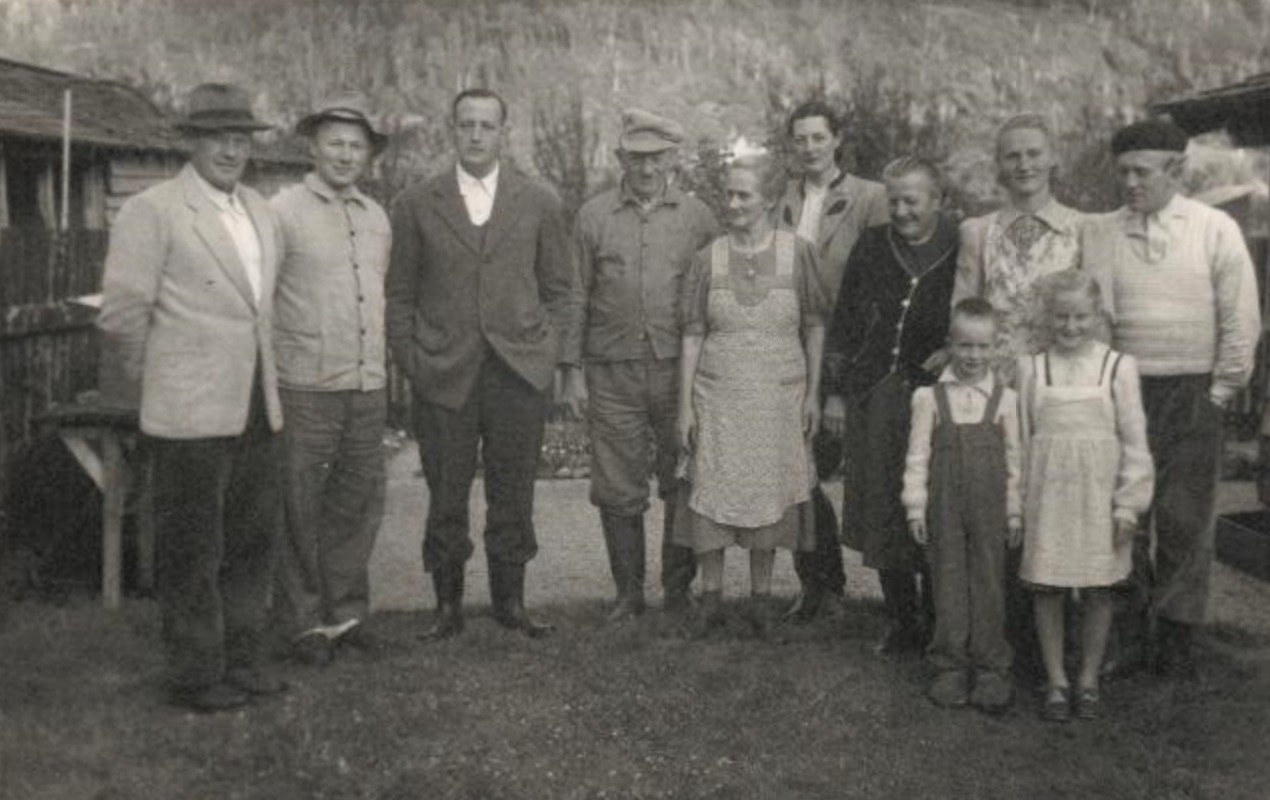
German settlers in Aysén Region, Chile, in 1951

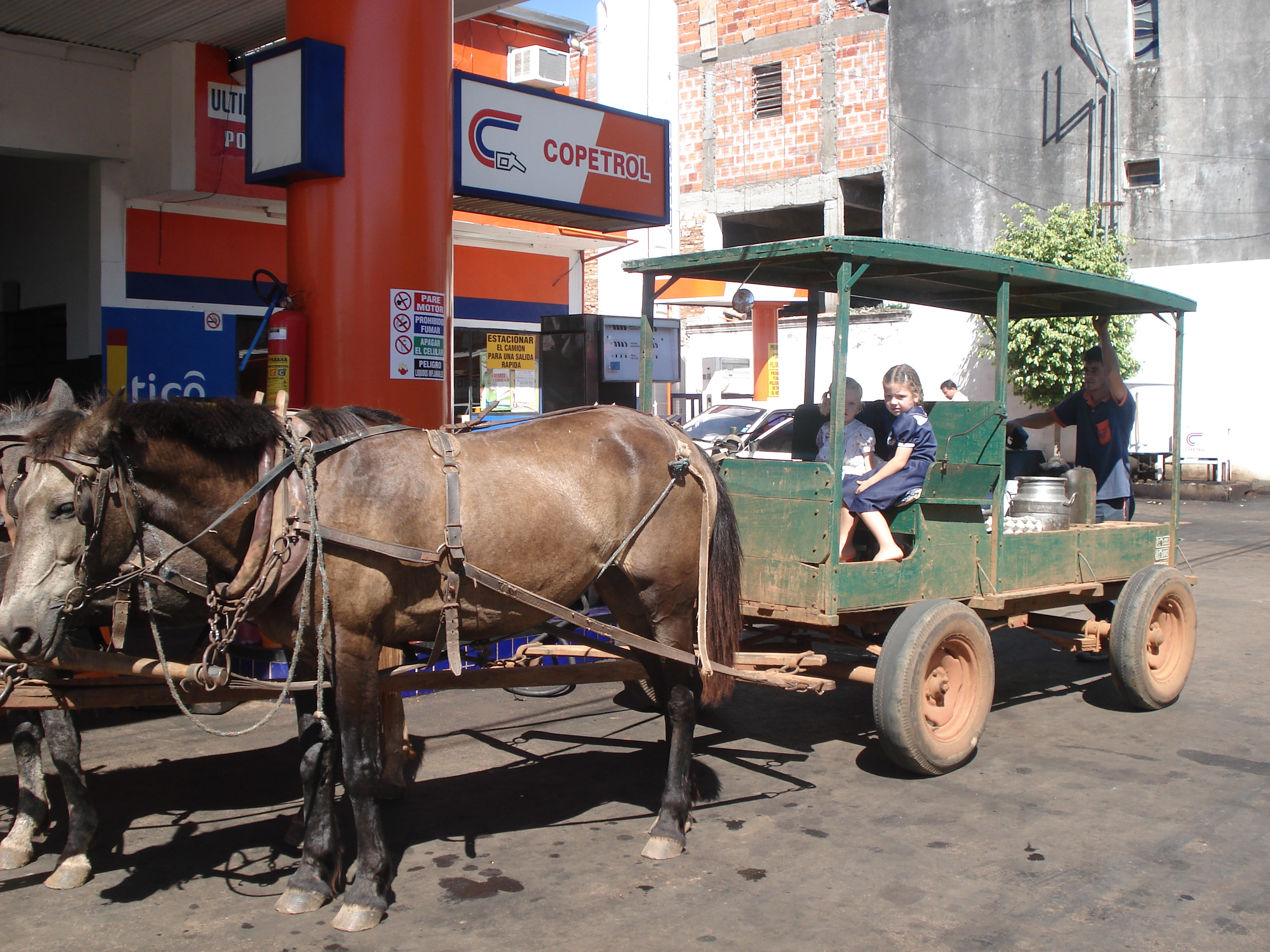
Mennonites in San Ignacio, Paraguay

- Argentina: Those of German ancestry constitute about 8% of the Argentine population — over 3 million — most of them Volga Germans alone — about 2 million. There are more than 400,000 of other German ancestries including Mennonites and German Swiss. These two groups are more common in Southern Argentina, and also in Santa Fe, Entre Rios and Cordoba provinces. A notable example is the town of Villa General Belgrano, founded by Germans in the 1930s. In the 1960s it became the site of the Fiesta Nacional de la Cerveza, or Oktoberfest, which has become a major attraction in Argentina. By 1940, there were 250,000 people of German descent living in the country. The German embassy in Argentina estimates that 660,000 Argentines, or 1.5% of the total population, are descendants of Germans who emigrated directly from Germany (It means that it doesn't include other ethnic Germans who emigrated from Austria, Switzerland, Russia/USSR, etc.). 50,000 German citizens live in Argentina.

Nazi Minister Walther Darré was born in Argentina. After the Second World War, almost a thousand prominent Nazi leaders and politicians fled to Argentina. Adolf Eichmann and Josef Mengele were among them. Kurt Tank, who developed some of the greatest World War II aircraft fighters, also entered Argentina in the late 1940s.

There are about 500,000 German-speakers in Argentina, slightly over 1% of population.

Furthermore, a wave of Ashkenazi immigrants came after the rise of Nazism in 1933, followed by as many as 19,000 German Jews. From 1939 until the end of World War II, immigration was put to a halt by anti-immigrant feelings in the country and restrictions on immigration from Germany.

- Bolivia: There are two different German groups: the descendants of those who emigrated from Germany and Brazil (estimated in about 160,000, 2% of Bolivian population) and the descendants of Mennonites that emigrated from Canada and Mexico (at least 85,000 of them live in agrarian communities). Germans are 237,000 or 2,5% of Bolivian population.

There are over 20,000 Standard German-speakers, plus 85,000 Mennonite Low German-speakers.

- Brazil: Mostly living in Southern Brazil. Brazil received 250,000 Germans between the 19th and 20th centuries. According to Born and Dickgiesser (1989, p. 55) the number of Brazilians of German descent in 1986 was 3.6 million. According to a 1999 survey by IBGE researcher Simon Schwartzman, in a representative sample of the Brazilian population 3,6% said they had German ancestry, a percentage that in a population of about 200 million amount to 7.2 million descendants. In 2004, Deutsche Welle cited the number of 5 million Brazilians of German descent. Hunsrückisch and East Pomeranian are some of the most prominent groups.

By 1940, the German diaspora in Brazil amounted about a million.
Around 14,000 German Citizens Registered in Brazil.
There are 3 million German-speakers in Brazil, slightly over 1.5% of population.

- Chile: The German-Chilean Chamber of Commerce estimated at 500,000 the descendants of Germans, about 3% of the total population of Chile estimated at 16 million (in the same source), mostly living in South Chile. Most of German settlers migrated from south Germany, particularly from traditionally Catholic Bavaria, Baden and the Rhineland; another group is Sudeten Germans from present-day Czech Republic; even included were Alsatians and Poles thru Partitions of Poland. German Chileans speak a local dialect called Lagunen-Deutsch. There are 40,000 Standard German-speakers.
- Ecuador: Ecuador has only few people of German descent. Notable is a small German population on the Island of Floreana (Galapagos): Between 1929 and circa 1950, roughly half a dozen Aussteigers were living on the Island. In 1934 three of them died under unclear circumstances, these events caused international media attention called Galapagos-affair. Today, the descendants of the Floreana-Germans have been assimilated into the local Ecuadorian population or re-immigrated to Germany.
- Paraguay : 166,000 Standard German-speakers (including 18,000 Mennonites, who don't speak Plattdeutsch or Mennonite Low German), most Germans in Paraguay are of Brazilian descent and Portuguese speakers; plus 20,000 Mennonite Low German, spoken by Mennonites who live in Chaco and Eastern Paraguay The Mennonites emigrated to Paraguay from Chihuahua State (in Mexico), the Soviet Union, Canada, and Bolivia. Non-Mennonites German emigrated to Paraguay mainly from Brazil, the Kingdom of Prussia, and the German Empire.

Those of German ancestry are 290,000, or 4.4% of Paraguayan population.

- Peru: The communities of Oxapampa, Pozuzo, and Villa Rica in the high jungles of the Peruvian Amazon basin were settled in the middle of the 19th century by Austrian and Prussian immigrants. Many of its present-day inhabitants speak German In the 18th century, German immigrants settled the areas of Tingo Maria, Tarapoto, Moyobamba, and the Amazonas Department. German immigrants largely settled in Lima, and to a lesser extent Arequipa.
- Uruguay: By 1940, there were 50,000 Germans living in the country.
- Venezuela:

=== Asia ===
In Japan, during the Meiji period (1868–1912), many Germans came to work in Japan as advisors to the new government. Despite Japan's isolationism and geographic distance, there have been a few Germans in Japan, since Germany's and Japan's fairly parallel modernization made Germans ideal O-yatoi gaikokujin. (See also Germany–Japan relations) In South Korea, there are Germans in Korea. In China, the German trading colony of Jiaozhou Bay in what is now Qingdao existed until 1914, and did not leave much more than breweries, including Tsingtao Brewery.Smaller numbers of ethnic Germans immigrated in the former Southeast Asian territories of Malaysia (British), Indonesia (Dutch) and the Philippines (American) in the late 19th and early 20th centuries. In Indonesia, some of them became well-known figures in history, such as C.G.C. Reinwardt (founder and first director of Bogor Botanical Garden), Walter Spies (German of Russian origin, who became the artist that made Bali known to the world), and Franz Wilhelm Junghuhn (owner of a big plantation in the south of Bandung and dubbed "the Humboldt of the East" because of his ethno-geographical notes).

Members of the German religious group known as Templers settled in Palestine in the late 19th century and lived there for several generations, but were expelled by the British from Mandatory Palestine during World War II, due to pro-Nazi sympathies expressed by many of them. Communist East Germany had relations with Vietnam and Uganda in Africa, but in these cases population movement went mostly to, not from, Germany. After the German reunification, a large percentage of "guest workers" from Communist nations sent to East Germany returned to their home countries.

=== Oceania ===
People with German ancestry as a percentage of the population in Australia divided geographically by statistical local area, as of the 2011 census

- Australia has received a significant number of ethnic-German immigrants from Germany and elsewhere. Numbers vary depending on who is counted, but moderate criteria give an estimate of 750,000 (4% of the population). The first wave of German immigration to Australia began in 1838, with the arrival of Prussian Lutheran settlers in South Australia (see German settlement in Australia). After the Second World War, Australia received a large influx of displaced ethnic Germans. In the 1950s and 1960s, German immigration continued as part of a large post-war wave of European immigration to Australia.

There have been ethnic Germans in Australia since the founding of the New South Wales colony in 1788, Governor Arthur Phillip (the first Governor of New South Wales) had a German father. But, the first significant wave of German immigration was in 1838. These Germans, mostly Prussian immigrants (but also winegrowers from the Hesse-Nassau state and the Rheingau). From there after, thousands of Germans emigrated to Australia until World War I. Also, German Australian was the most identified ethnicity behind English and Irish in Australia until World War I. After World War II, large numbers of Germans emigrated to Australia to escape war-torn Europe. Many German Australians speak a dialect developed in Australia called Barossa German, a German dialect developed in Barossa Valley.

- New Zealand has received modest, but steady, ethnic German immigration from the mid-19th century. Today the number of New Zealanders with German ancestry is estimated to be approximately 200,000 (5% of the population). Many German New Zealanders anglicized their names during the 20th century due to the negative perception of Germans fostered by World War I and World War II. New Zealanders of German descent include the late former Prime Minister David Lange. The vast majority of Germans in New Zealand settled in the North Island, with a couple settling in the Christchurch area. Cities such as Tauranga, Nelson and, to a lesser extent, Auckland have been somewhat influenced by German culture and values.

== History ==
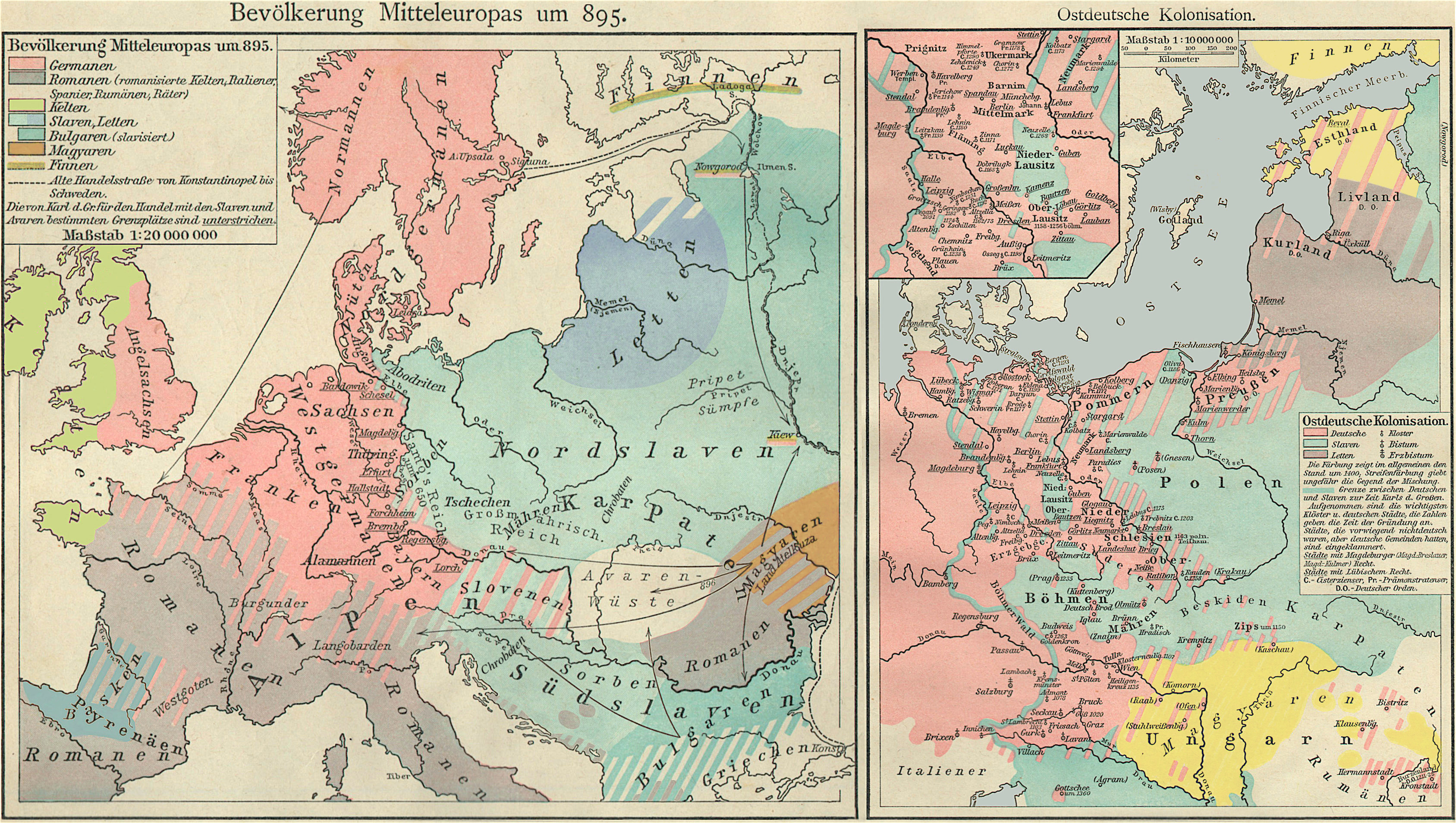
German eastward expansion 895—1400

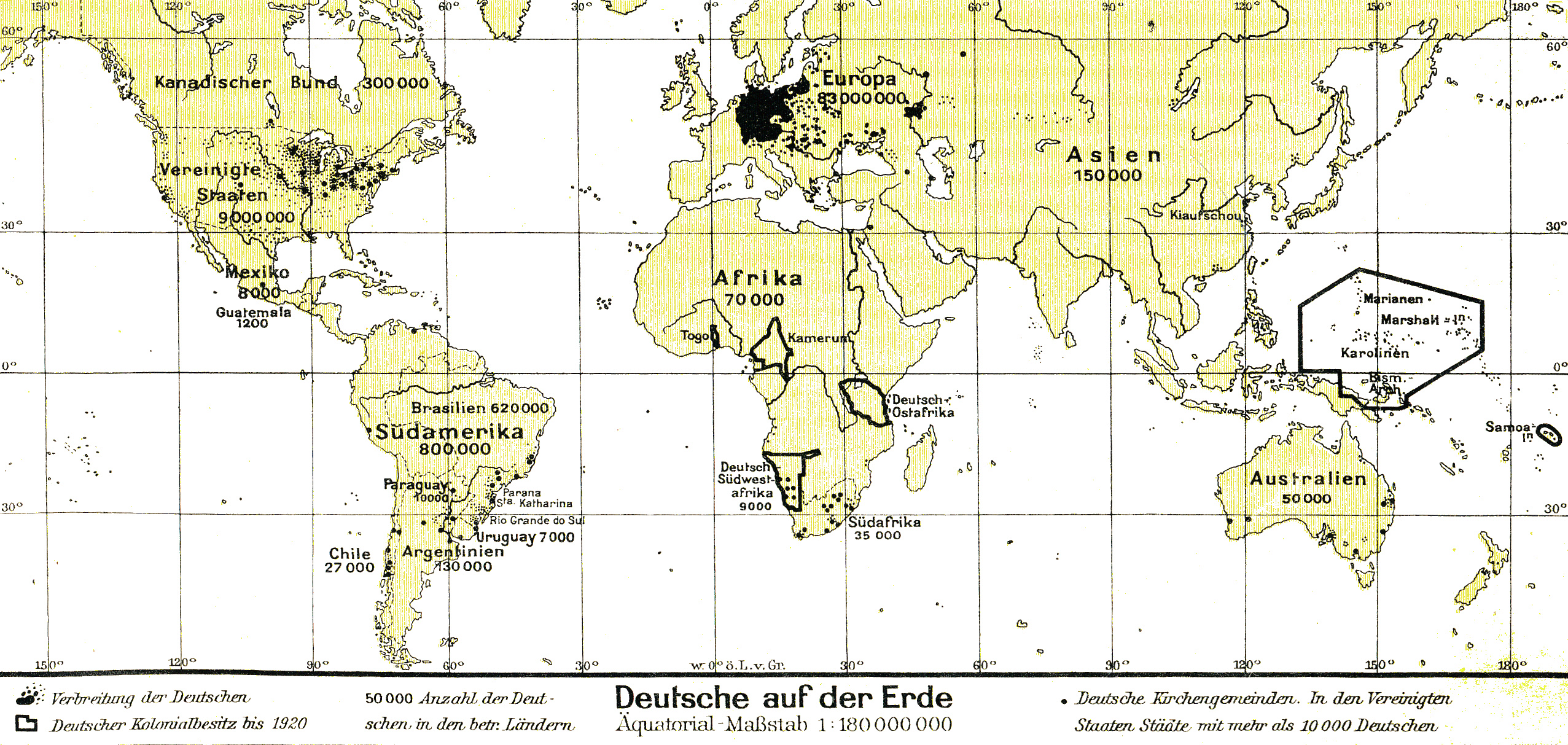
Map depicting the distribution of the German diaspora during the early 20th century

From Celtic times, the early Germanic tribes settled from the Baltic all the way to the Black Sea until the great migrations of the 4-6th century AD.

Medieval Germans migrated eastwards during the medieval period Ostsiedlung until the flight, evacuation and expulsion of Germans after World War II; many areas in Central and Eastern Europe had an ethnic German population. In the Middle Ages, Germans were invited to migrate to Poland and the central and eastern regions of the German Holy Roman Empire and also the Kingdom of Hungary following the Mongol invasions of the 12th century, and then once again during the late 17th century after the Austrian-Ottoman wars to set up farms and repopulate the eastern regions of the Austrian Empire and Balkans.

The Nazi government termed such ethnic Germans Volksdeutsche, regardless of how long they had been residents of other countries. (Now they would be considered Auslandsdeutsche). During World War II, Nazi Germany classified ethnic Germans as Übermenschen, while Jews, Gypsies, Slavic peoples, mainly ethnic Poles and Serbs, along with Black and mixed-race people were called Untermenschen. After the war, Central European nations such as Poland, the Czechoslovakia, Hungary, as well as the Soviet Union in Eastern Europe, and Yugoslavia in the Balkan region of Southern Europe, expelled most of the ethnic Germans living in their territories.

There were significant ethnic German populations in such areas as Romania, Moldova, and Ukraine at one time. As recently as 1990, there were one million standard German speakers and 100,000 Plautdietsch speakers in Kazakhstan alone, and 38,000, 40,000 and 101,057 standard German speakers in Ukraine, Uzbekistan, and Kyrgyzstan, respectively.

There were reportedly 500,000 ethnic Germans in Poland in 1998. Recent official figures show 147,000 (as of 2002). Of the 745,421 Germans in Romania in 1930, only about 60,000 remain. In Hungary the situation is quite similar, with only about 220,000. There are up to one million Germans in the former Soviet Union, mostly in a band from southwestern Russia and the Volga valley, through Omsk and Altai Krai (597,212 Germans in Russia, 2002 Russian census) to Kazakhstan (353,441 Germans in Kazakhstan, 1999 Kazakhstan census). Germany admitted approximately 1.63 million ethnic Germans from the former Soviet Union between 1990 and 1999.

These Auslandsdeutsche, as they are now generally known, have been streaming out of the former Eastern Bloc since the early 1990s. For example, many ethnic Germans from the former Soviet Union have taken advantage of the German Law of Return, a policy which grants citizenship to all those who can prove to be a refugee or expellee of German ethnic origin or the spouse or descendant of such a person. This exodus has occurred despite the fact that many of the ethnic Germans from the former Soviet Union were highly assimilated and spoke little or no German.

=== Historical countries ===
==== Former Yugoslavia ====
According to the 1921 census, the German community was the largest minority group in the Kingdom of Yugoslavia (505,790 inhabitants or 4.22%).

== Groupings ==
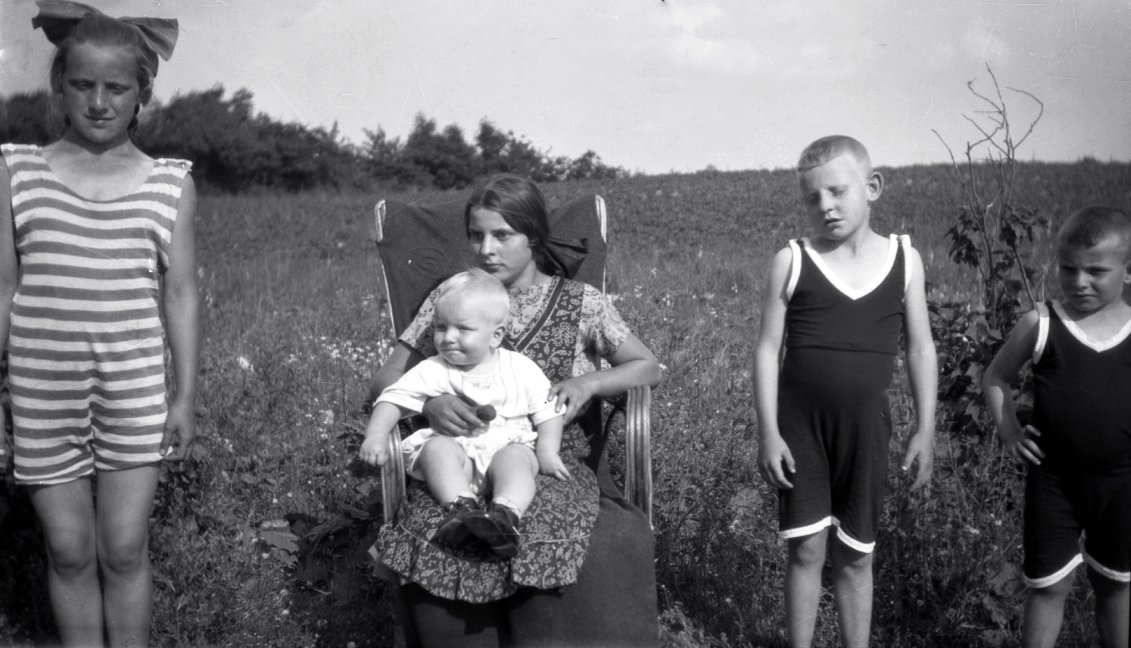
German Namibians in Keetmanshoop, 1926

Note that many of these groups have since migrated elsewhere. This list simply gives the region with which they are associated, and does not include people from countries with German as an official national language. In general, it also omits some collective terms in common use defined by political border changes where this is antithetical to the current structure. Such terms include:

- Ungarndeutsche / Germans of Hungary (of the Austria-Hungary empire, 1867–1918).
- Serbiendeutsche / Germans of Serbia (former Yugoslavia).
- Rumäniendeutsche / Germans of Romania (one of Many Eastern European German settlements extending from Belarus to Slovakia to Ukraine).

Roughly grouped:

- Germans of Bohemia and Moravia, often known as Sudeten Germans (now the Czech Republic).
- Germans of Silesia (now Poland).
- Germans of East Prussia (the largest group), including
  - Germans of Poland; see also:
    - the Polonized Bambrzy (notice that Bambrzy are not part of German minority).
  - those from Lithuania: Prussian-Lithuanians and Baltic Germans.
  - Baltic Germans of Latvia and Estonia, Prussian-Polonians, Prussian Latvians, and ethnic Germans in Belarus.
- The German-Briton group of the United Kingdom (sometimes called British Germans), and German Poles living in the UK since the end of World War II.
- Schleswigsch Germans in South Jutland County, Denmark, see North Schleswig Germans.
- German-speaking citizens of the Netherlands (386,200 - 2.37% of the population), including Limburger Germans.
- German-speaking Belgians, mostly in the German-speaking Community of Belgium (DGB - Deutschsprachige Gemeinschaft Belgiens), and about 1 to 3 percent of Belgians speak German.
- Cimbrians in Italy.
- Móchenos in Italy.
- Germans in Slovenia: in the Gottschee County, in the Lower Styrian towns of Maribor, Celje and Ptuj, and in the Apače area.
- the original Hutterites.
- Russian Mennonites in Ukraine, including the Mennonite Brethren.
- Transylvanian Saxons in Romania.
- Transylvanian Landler Protestants in Romania.
- Bukovina Germans from Bukovina, Romania.
- Carpathian Germans in Romania, as well as nearby Hungary, Slovakia and Ukraine.
  - Zipser, from Spiš (Carpathian German heartland) to northern Romania.
- Regat Germans in southern and eastern Romania.
- Danube Swabians, including:
  - those in the Bačka.
  - Banat Swabians in the Serbian and Romanian Banat, as well as a handful in Bulgaria.
  - Satu Mare Swabians in Romania, a much smaller colony as a result of the two world wars and the Communist era.
  - most Germans of Hungary (especially Swabian Turkey).
  - in Croatia (where it is a recognized minority language).
  - and Bosnia and Herzegovina, though are now minuscule in number since World War II.
- Black Sea Germans in southern Ukraine, Moldova, Romania and Bulgaria including:
  - Germans of the Crimea.
  - Dobrujan Germans of Romania and Bulgaria.
  - Bessarabia Germans roughly from what is now Moldova.
- Germans of Volhynia (German Volhynians).
- Galiziendeutsche in Galicia.
- German Russians, estimated at 5 million throughout Russia, and German Ukrainians, included in Ukraine.
- Caucasus Germans (also Swabians) in the northern Caucasus, Georgia, and Azerbaijan.
- the rest of the Germans in the former USSR, including:
  - Volga Germans.
  - Russian Mennonites.
  - Germans of Kazakhstan.
- Bosporus Germans, originally craftsmen in and around Istanbul, Turkey.
- Cyprus has a German expatriate community.

In the Americas, one can divide the groups by current nation of residence:

- German Canadians and German-Americans, the largest ethno-ancestral group in the USA documented by the 2000 United States census.
  - Texas Germans (see also the List of German Texans).
  - Hutterites who speak Hutterite German.
- German Mexicans, including Mennonites in Mexico as well as many notable figures, see German-, Austrian-, Hungarian-, and Polish- subcategories of European Mexicans, esp. in the Northern states.
- Deutschbrasilianer in Brazil, whose various languages comprise Brazilian German.
- German Argentines with prominent personalities and a notable German impact on Argentine culture.
  - Uruguay, known for a German community.
- Germans of Paraguay.
- Germans, mostly from outside the borders of Germany, in the rest of Latin America, especially:
  - German-Puerto Ricans (and a similar community in the Virgin Islands).
  - Heavy concentration of German, Austrian and Swiss descendants in Southern Chile. (German Chileans).
  - Peru, not many are German speakers, see German Peruvian.
  - German Venezuelans, for example Colonia Tovar where settlers came from Baden, and Colonia Agrícola de Turén where settlers were Germans of the Bukovina Region and some Germans of Poland, in Colonia Tovar the dialect Alemán Coloniero is dramatically disappearing and losing popularity being replaced mainly by Spanish, meanwhile in Colonia Agrícola de Turén some German is still spoken.
  - Colombia (German Colombians), Cuba and the Dominican Republic.
  - Central America.

...or by ethnic or religious criteria:

- Pennsylvania Dutch - in the Northeastern US.
- Amish found in the US, notably Ohio, Pennsylvania, Indiana and New York.
- Volga Germans and Plautdietsch-speaking Russian Mennonites.
  - in Canada, (e.g. Chortitzer Mennonite Conference).
  - in the United States, for instance in Kansas, New York, and Chicago, Illinois where millions of residents self-claim to be German (American).
  - throughout Latin America, most notably in Mexico.
- Hutterites who speak Hutterite German.
- "Germania" - from the mid 19th century to after World Wars I or II, a large ethnic and cultural German presence in many towns in the Midwestern US.

In Africa, Oceania, and East/Southeast Asia

- Germans of Namibia, Togo, Cameroon, Tanzania and South Africa, which was never a pre-WWI German colony.
- German Angolans
- German Australians and German New Zealanders.
- Germans in the colony of Jiaozhou Bay, China, who founded (among others) the Tsingtao Brewery in today's Qingdao.
- Small numbers of German expatriates in East Asia and Southeast Asia (Burma, Hong Kong, Indonesia, Japan, Malaysia, Philippines, South Korea, Taiwan, Thailand and Vietnam).
- German cultural traits remain in Papua New Guinea.

== German-language media worldwide ==
Distribution of native German speakers in the world today

A visible sign of the geographical extension of the German language is the German-language media outside the German-speaking countries. German is the second most commonly used scientific language as well as the third most widely used language on websites after English and Russian. Deutsche Welle (German pronunciation: [ˈdɔʏtʃə ˈvɛlə]; "German Wave" in German), or DW, is Germany's public international broadcaster. The service is available in 30 languages. DW's satellite television service consists of channels in German, English, Spanish, and Arabic.

German-speakers can visit the websites of German-language newspapers and TV- and radio stations. The free software MediathekView allows the downloading of videos from the websites of some public German, Austrian, and Swiss TV stations and of the public Franco-German TV network ARTE. With the webpage "onlinetvrecorder.com," it is possible to record programs of many German and some international TV stations. Note that some material is region-restricted for legal reasons and cannot be accessed from everywhere in the world. Some websites have a paywall or limit the access for free/unregistered users.

See also:

- List of newspapers in Germany and List of German-language newspapers published in the United States
- List of magazines in Germany
- List of television stations in Germany and List of German-language television channels
- List of radio stations in Germany and List of German-language radio stations
- Goethe-Institut [ˈɡøːtə ʔɪnstiˌtuːt] (a non-profit German cultural association operational worldwide with 159 institutes, promoting the study of the German language abroad and encouraging international cultural exchange and relations.)

== Germany's policy on dual citizenship ==
Since June 27, 2024, unrestricted dual citizenship has been possible.

Prior to that date, German nationality law allowed dual citizenship only with other EU countries and Switzerland; with other countries, in some cases:

1. With special permission ("Beibehaltungsgenehmigung"), for which German citizens must apply before taking the other citizenship (otherwise, German citizenship is automatically lost). Non-EU and non-Swiss citizens wanting to be naturalized in Germany must usually renounce their old citizenship, but may keep it if their country does not allow the renunciation of citizenship, or if the renunciation process is too difficult/humiliating/expensive, or, rarely, in individual cases if the renunciation of the old citizenship means enormous disadvantages for the concerned person.
2. If dual citizenship was obtained at birth. Some countries do not accept the "dual-citizenship-by-birth principle," so the concerned person must later choose one citizenship and renounce the other.
3. Under Article 116 par. 2 of the Basic Law (Grundgesetz), former German citizens who between 30 January 1933, and 8 May 1945, were deprived of their German citizenship on political, racial, or religious grounds may re-invoke their citizenship and the same applies to their descendants, and are permitted to hold dual (or multiple) citizenship.

A law adopted in June 2019 allows the revocation of the German citizenship of dual citizens who have joined or supported a terror militia such as the Islamic State and are at least 18 years old.

Naturalized Germans can lose their German citizenship if it is found out that they got it by willful deceit / bribery / menacing / giving intentionally false or incomplete information that had been important for the naturalization process. In June 2019, it was decided to prolong the deadline from 5 to 10 years after naturalization.

== Visa requirements ==
Visa requirements for German citizens: Germany Freedom of movement Visa not required / ETA (Note: ETA required for Australia, Canada if arriving by air, Cape Verde, Kenya, New Zealand, South Korea and the United States.) (Note: Including Australian eVisitor.) Visa on arrival (Note: Including tourist card required in advance for Cuba.) eVisa (Note: Including visa on arrival with ETA for Pakistan.) Visa available both on arrival (Note: Including visa on arrival with ETA for Sri Lanka.) or online (Note: Including Indonesian e-VOA.) Visa required prior to arrival

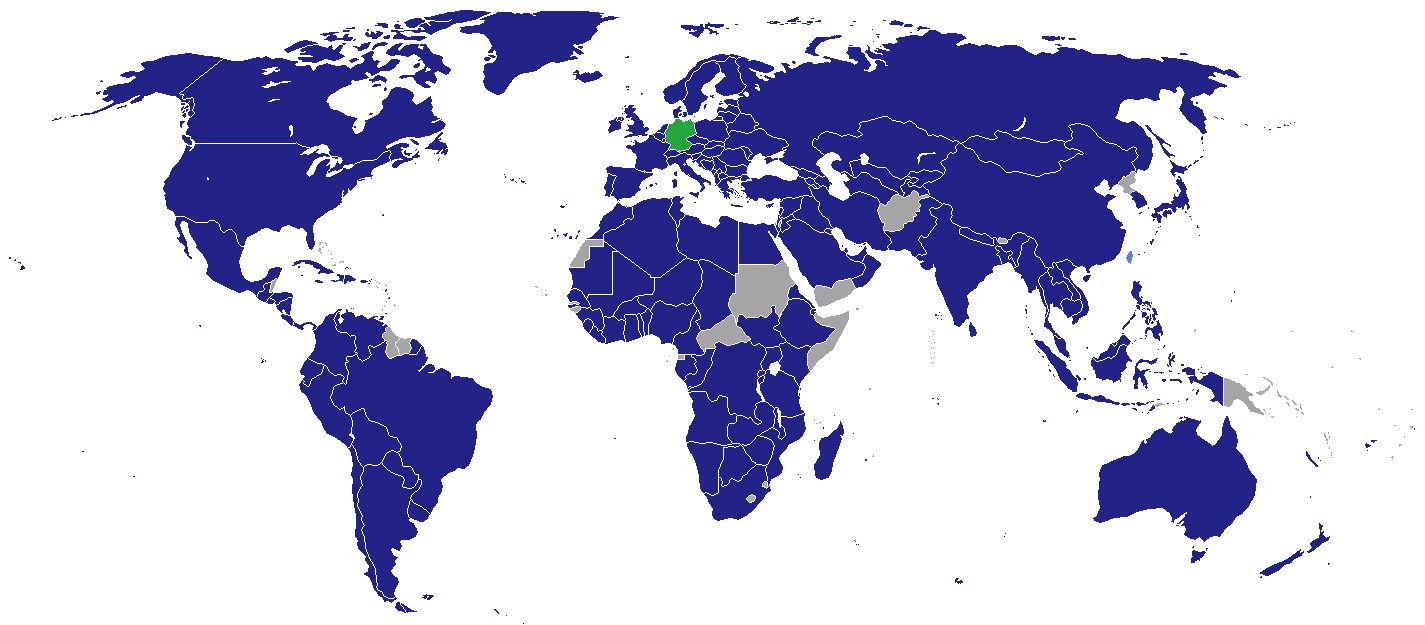
Diplomatic missions of Germany

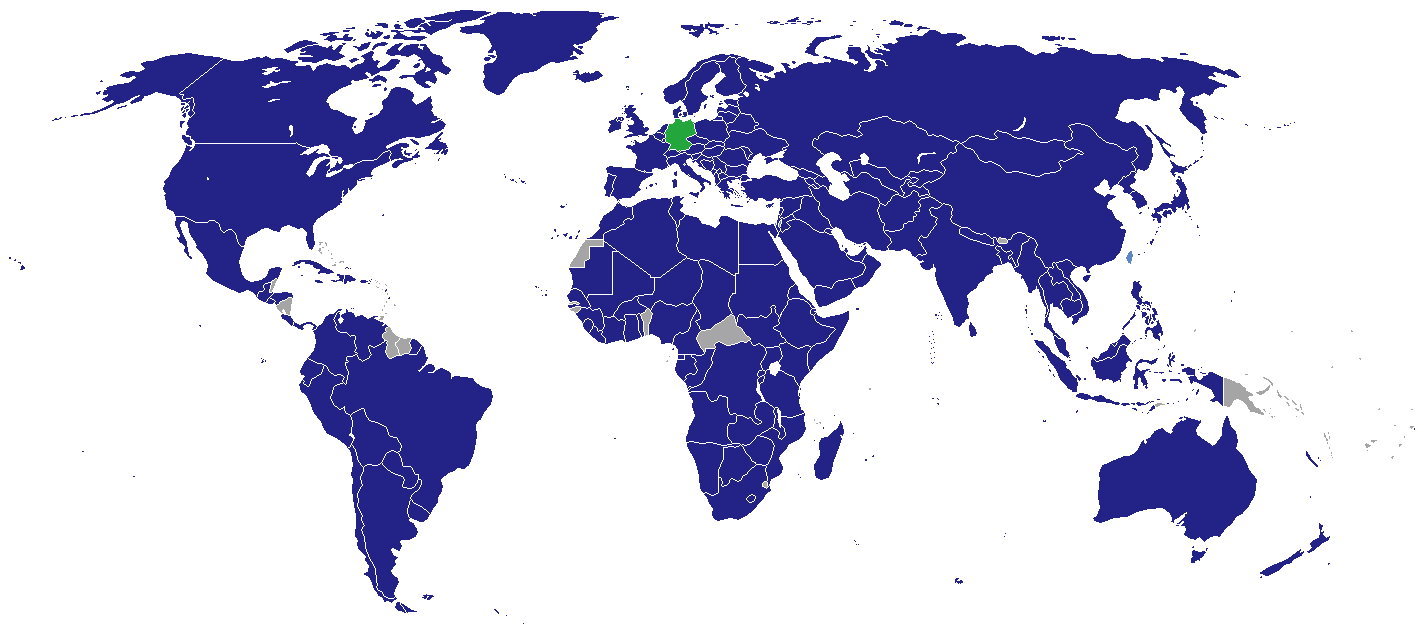
Diplomatic missions in Germany

As of 10 September 2025, German citizens had visa-free or visa on arrival access to 188 countries and territories. Ranking the German passport 4th in terms of travel freedom, tied with the greatest access of all European Union member states along with Italy, Luxembourg and Spain, according to the Henley Passport Index.

=== Freedom of movement within other EU countries and the EFTA countries ===
As EU citizens, Germans can live and work indefinitely in other EU countries and the EFTA countries; however, the right to vote and work in certain sensitive fields (such as government, police, military) might in some cases be restricted to the local citizens only. The EU/EFTA countries can exclude immigrants from getting welfare for a certain time period to avoid "welfare tourism," and they can refuse welfare completely if the immigrants do not have a job after a certain period of time and do not try to get one. Immigrants convicted of welfare fraud can be deported and be refused the re-entry of the country.

=== Right to consular protection in non-EU countries ===
When in a non-EU country where there is no German embassy, Germans as EU citizens have the right to get consular protection from the embassy of any other EU country present in that country. See List of diplomatic missions of Germany and List of diplomatic missions in Germany.

German citizens can be extradited only to other EU countries or to international courts of justice, and only if a law allows this (German Basic Law, Art. 16). Before the introduction of the European Arrest Warrant, the extradition of German citizens was generally prohibited by the German Basic Law.

Germany regularly publishes travel warnings on the website of the Auswärtiges Amt (Federal Foreign Office) to its citizens. The Office allows German citizens to register online in a special list, the Krisenvorsorgeliste ("Crisis-Prevention List") before they travel abroad (Elektronische Erfassung von Deutschen im Ausland [ELEFAND] Electronic Registration of Germans Being Abroad). With a password, the registered persons can change or update their data. The registration is voluntary and free of charge. It can be used for longer stays (longer than 6 months), but also for a vacation of only two weeks. The earliest date of registration is 10 days before the planned trip.

== See also ==
- Aussiedler and Spätaussiedler
- Geographical distribution of German speakers
- German question
- Germanic peoples
- Pan-Germanism
- Unification of Germany
- Völkisch movement

== References and notes ==
=== References ===
Most numbers are from the www.ethnologue.com, apart from a few from German language and Germans, as well as the following:
