= St. Mary's Anglican Church, Rosettenville =

Building in South Africa

St. Mary's Anglican Church
- St. Mary's Anglican Church
- 26°15′01″S 28°03′17″E
- Address: 114 Cnr Zinnia and, Albert St
- Country: South Africa
- Denomination: Anglican

Architecture
- Architect(s): Baker and Fleming
- Groundbreaking: Early 20th century

Administration
- Diocese: Diocese of Christ the King

St. Mary's Anglican Church, a church in the Diocese of Christ the King, built at the beginning of the twentieth century, but before 1907, is one of the first churches built in Rosettenville, Johannesburg. The church was built with a quarried natural stone which was provided by Leo Rosettenstein, the township owner after whom Rosettenville was named. The building was designed by the firm of Baker and Fleming. The churchwardens continue to take good care of the building and it remains in pristine condition.
