= Germans in the United Kingdom =

One of the largest ethnic minorities in the United Kingdom

Total population
- Germany-born residents in the United Kingdom: 290,736 – 0.4% (2021/22 Census) (Note: Does not include ethnic Germans born in the United Kingdom or those with German ancestry); England: 252,252 – 0.4% (2021); Scotland: 23,315 – 0.4% (2022); Wales: 11,114 – 0.4% (2021); Northern Ireland: 4,053 – 0.2% (2021); German citizens/passports held: 119,354 (England and Wales only, 2021)

Languages
- British English and German

Religion
- Catholicism · Lutheranism · Anglicanism

Related ethnic groups
- Germans in the Netherlands · Dutch Britons · German New Zealanders · Germans in France · Germans in Ireland

There are many Germans living in the United Kingdom, and many Britons or German British (German: Deutsch-Briten) have German ancestry, including the British royal family. While those born in Germany constitute one of the UK's largest foreign-born groups, many are British nationals, rather than German nationals, who were born in Germany to British military personnel based there.

== History ==
The Anglo-Saxons, who are one of the ancestors and forefathers of modern English people, were a Germanic people who came from northern Germany during the Migration Period and gave name to the modern German state of Lower Saxony and the Anglian peninsula, which is the region from where they came from, making the English people a Germanic people and the English language a Germanic language.

More recent examples include the Hanseatic merchants of the Middle Ages and also the 16th-century Protestant refugees who emigrated to Great Britain to flee the instability caused by the religious wars after the Reformation. By the end of the 17th century, a significant German community had developed, consisting mostly of businessmen, mainly from Hamburg; sugar bakers; and other economic migrants.

In 1709 and 1710, thousands of Germans from the Electorate of the Palatinate, which had been invaded by French forces and suffered a severe winter, also migrated to England. Queen Anne's government had invited them, with the plan to settle them in the North American colonies. Some stayed in the London area.

In 1714, George I, a German Hanoverian prince, ascended to the British throne and founded the British House of Hanover. Every subsequent British monarch until Edward VII, in the 20th century, would take a German spouse.

Edward VII did not take a German spouse, but his wife was a Danish princess of German ancestry. His son would marry a British-born princess of predominantly-German ancestry, and his great-granddaughter Elizabeth II would marry a Greek prince of predominantly-German ancestry.

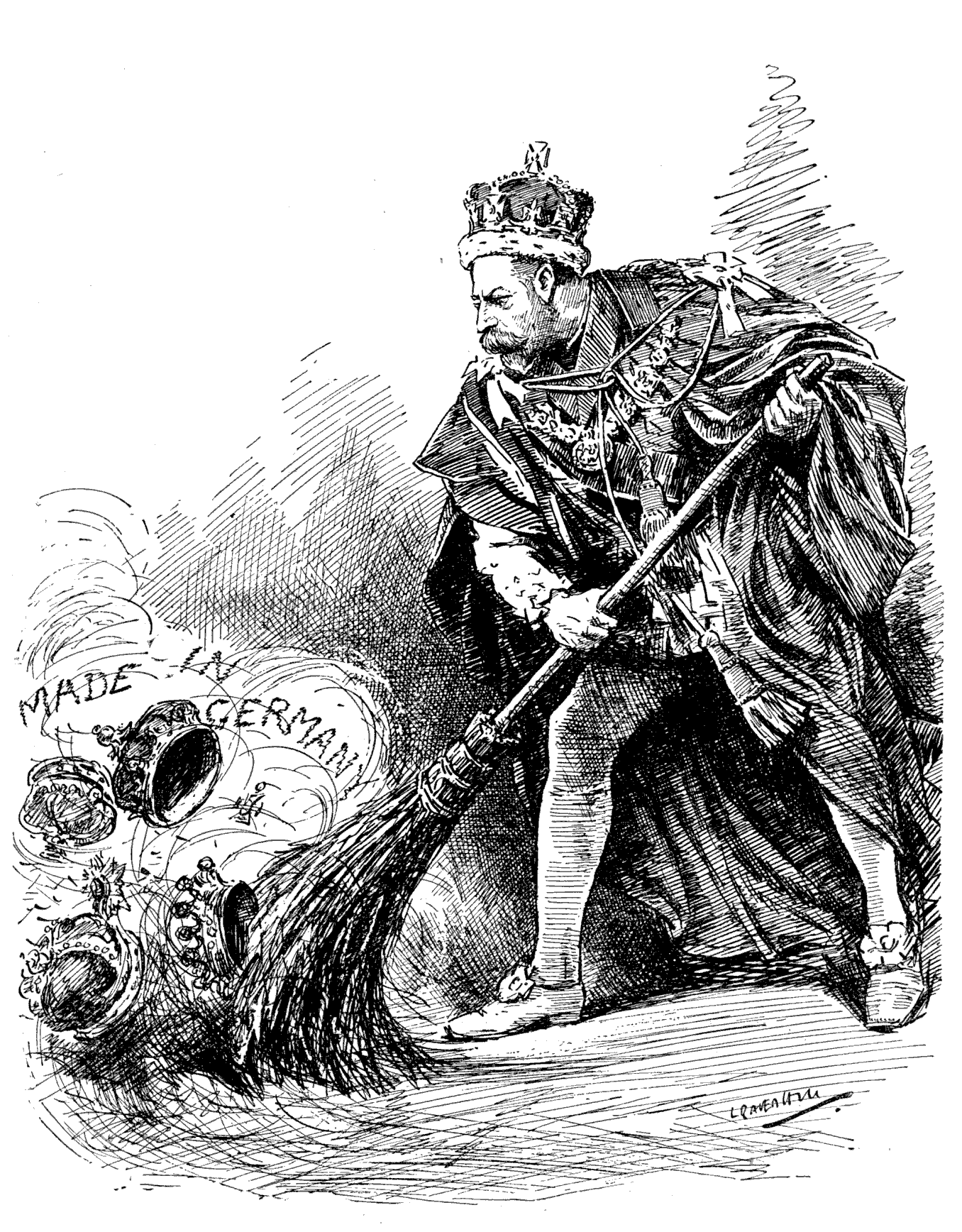
1917 Punch cartoon depicting King George V abolishing the German titles held by members of his family in the United Kingdom

The British royal family retained the German surname Saxe-Coburg-Gotha until 1917, when, in response to anti-German sentiment during the First World War, it legally changed it to the English-sounding Windsor. King George V famously relinquished all his titles he held in Germany, and the Titles Deprivation Act 1917 deprived three British princes (two from the House of Hanover and one from the House of Saxe-Coburg and Gotha) of their titles. Even today, the Royal Family is sometimes parodied as being German.

In terms of religion, St Georges, a Lutheran Church dating from 1762/63, is the oldest German church in the UK. The congregation was founded by Dederich Beckmann, a wealthy sugar boiler and cousin of the first pastor. It served as a religious centre for generations of German immigrants who worked in the East End sugar refineries, and meat and baking trades until the First World War. During the Nazi period in Germany, St George's pastor Julius Rieger set up a relief centre for Jewish refugees from Germany, who were provided with references to travel to Britain. The leading theologian and anti-Nazi activist Dietrich Bonhoeffer was also associated with the work of St George's when Bonhoeffer was pastor at the nearby St Paul's church between 1933 and 1935.

== Population and distribution ==
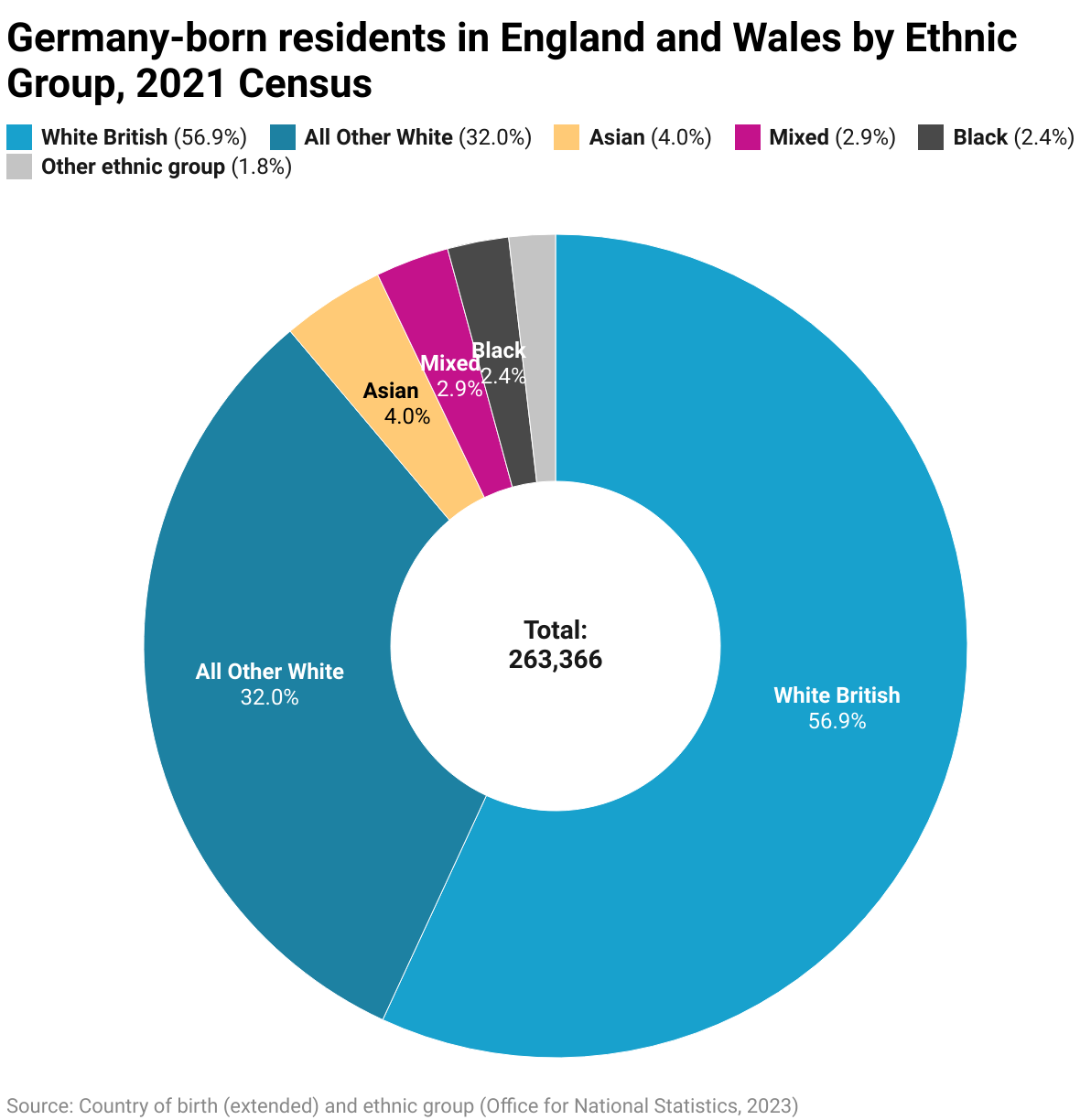
Germany-born residents by ethnic group (2021 census, England and Wales)

The 2001 UK Census recorded 266,136 people born in Germany, making them the fourth-largest foreign-born group after Irish, Indians and Pakistanis. A large proportion of these people are thought to be the children of British military based in Germany at the time of their birth, who have since returned to the UK with their families. Wiltshire, Colchester, North Yorkshire and Aldershot, which are all home to significant army populations, had a combined population of 12,000 born in Germany.

The 2011 UK Census recorded 262,356 Germany-born residents in England, 11,208 in Wales, 22,274 in Scotland, and 3,908 in Northern Ireland.

The Office for National Statistics estimates that in 2013, there were 297,000 people living in the UK who had been born in Germany, but that 189,000 of these were British nationals. The total number of German nationals resident in the UK, regardless of ethnic origin or birthplace, is estimated at 126,000 in 2013.

Other than in areas with army bases, clusters of people born in Germany are found in West London, particularly around Richmond, where there is a German school.

== Influence ==
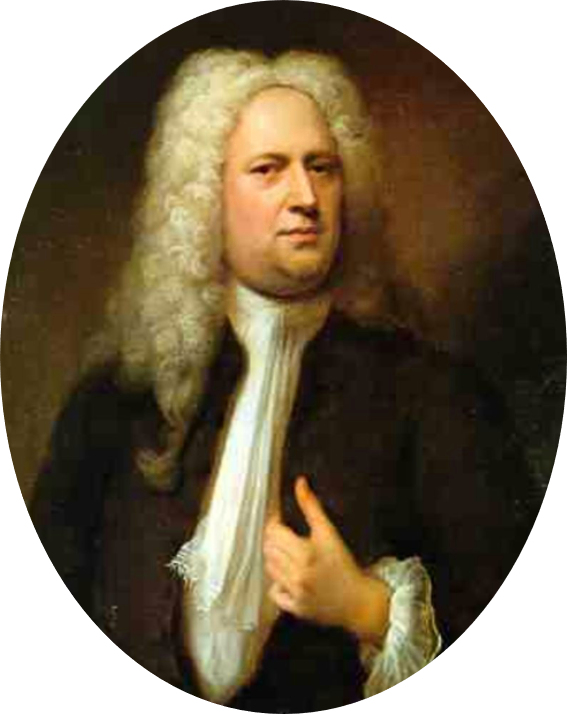
Georg Friedrich Händel lived most of his adult life in England, becoming a British citizen by Act of Parliament.

German Britons and German speakers have contributed to numerous areas in British life, especially in establishing powerful family dynasties. There are also areas and buildings named after famous Germans, such as Holbein Place in Central London, named after the Renaissance painter Hans Holbein the Younger, as well as the Herschel Museum of Astronomy, an independent museum in Bath dedicated to the life and works of the famous astronomer William Herschel, who discovered the planet Uranus in 1781.

In music, George Frideric Handel, one of the greatest composers of the Baroque era in the first half of the 18th century, was commissioned to write four anthems for the coronation ceremony of King George II. He became a subject of the British crown in 1727.

In business and commerce, Germans have also been highly successful. Backes & Strauss, the world's oldest diamond company was founded in 1789 by German businessmen Georg Carl Backes and (later on) Max Strauss. In 1818 Johann Heinrich Schröder founded with his brother, the London-based firm Schroders, today one of the world's largest investment banks. In 1851 Paul Julius Reuter founded the Reuters news agency, now one of the large financial media organisations in the world.

Ekkehard von Kuenssberg was the founder and president of the Royal College of General Practitioners. As far as influential families go, the Freuds (present in the UK today via Emma and Matthew) can trace their roots back to Germany and have the Freud Museum named in honour of family patriarch Sigmund. John Jacob Astor, 1st Baron Astor of Hever, founded the Astor dynasty in England. The Battenberg family's roots go back to Prince Louis of Battenberg who became a British subject, and whose immediate descendants were his youngest son Louis Mountbatten, 1st Earl Mountbatten of Burma, and his grandson Prince Philip, Duke of Edinburgh and husband of Queen Elizabeth II.

== Education ==
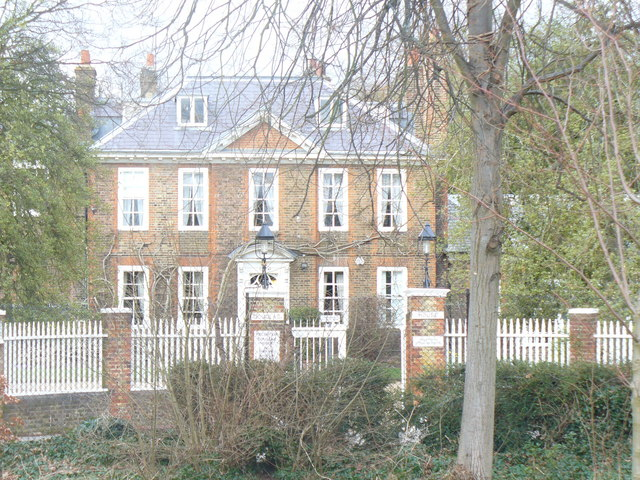
German School London

The German School London serves German families in the UK's capital city.

== See also ==
- Germany–United Kingdom relations
- German diaspora
- Immigration to the United Kingdom
- British migration to Germany
