= St. Martin's School (Rosettenville) =

Coordinates: 26°15′01″S 28°03′38″E

Saint Martin's School

Location
- 114 Victoria Street; Klipriviersberg; Johannesburg 2190; South Africa

Information
- Type: Private
- Motto: Latin: Non Recuso Laborem (I do not shirk work)
- Established: 1908
- Locale: Suburban
- Acting Headmaster: Warren Venter
- Grades: 000 - 12
- Colors: Blue, Maroon and White
- Fees: R 115 000 p.a. (boarding); R 65 000 to R120 000 p.a. (tuition)
- Website: stmartin.co.za

St Martin's School is an Anglican private co-educational school in The Hill, Johannesburg, South Africa.

== History ==
St. Martin’s School traces its origins back to the foundation of St. Agnes School for the training of domestic helpers in 1908. A few years later in 1911, St. Peter’s Priory and College were added, offering a boarding-based high school education to the young men who came from all over South Africa. The College was run by the Anglican Order of the Community of the Resurrection. Trevor Huddleston, one of the priests of the community was based at St Peter's for a number of years, and it was he who gave Hugh Masekela his first trumpet, which he acquired from Louis Armstrong whilst on a trip to the USA.

St. Peter's College soon became known as the "Black Eton" where academic achievements were espoused. The list of the early alumni includes Oliver Tambo, Fikile Bam and Masekela.

The apartheid policies of the National Party regime, specifically the Bantu Education Act put pressure on the school and it was closed in 1956. However, the Anglican Church ensured that education continued and the school reopened in 1958 as St. Martin's School.

Founded as a boys' school, St Martin's became the established Anglican Diocesan School for the south of Johannesburg. In 1978, the school became a co-educational institution.

A Preparatory School was opened in 1971, and is situated on a picturesque campus in The Hill, overlooking Moffat Park. In December 2022, the High School was relocated from the Rosettenville campus to the Preparatory School campus at East Road in the Hill, which is now home to both the Preparatory School and High School.

Since the multiplication of the Anglican Diocese of Johannesburg in 1990, the school has been the Diocesan School for the Diocese of Christ the King. The bishop of the diocese is the visitor to the School.

The school celebrated its Diamond Jubilee in 2018.

=== Headmasters ===
- Michael Stern, OBE (1958–1963)
- Michael de Lisle (1963–1972)
- Oliver Wigmore (1973–1984)
- Peter Vieyra (1985–1990)
- James Welsh (1990–2016)
- Thomas Hagspihl (2017–2022)
- Warren Venter (Acting Head 2023)
- Warren Venter (2024 - )

=== Heads of St Martin's Preparatory School ===
- Mrs P. H. Bestelink (1971–1983); founding headmistress
- Mr F. G. Keon (1976–1984) (Senior Prep School)
- Mrs R. Y. McAlister (1984–1986) (Junior Prep School)
- Mr G. M. Greenway (1986–1997)
- Mr B. E. Crouser (1997–1999)
- Mr L. Jacobs (1999–2001)
- Mr D. I. Maritz (2001–2012)
- The Revd M. M. Chalmers (2012–2019)
- Mrs M. Myburgh (2019-2022)
- Mrs T. Easton (Acting Head 2023)
- Mrs T. Easton (2024 - )

=== Visitors to the School ===
The bishop of Johannesburg was the visitor to the school until 1990, and these were:

- Rt Revd Ambrose Reeves (1958 - 1961)
- Rt Revd Leslie Stradling (1961 - 1974)
- Rt Revd Timothy Bavin (1974 - 1985)
- Most Revd Desmond Tutu (1985 - 1987)
- Rt Revd Duncan Buchanan (1987 - 1990)

From 1990 onwards the visitor to the school is the bishop of the Diocese of Christ the King.

- Rt Revd Peter Lee (1990 - 2016)
- Rt Revd William Mostert (2017 - 2023)
- Rt Revd Mkhuseli Harrison Sobantwana (2023 - )

== Notable alumni ==
- Peter Hatendi, bishop
- Peter Klatzow, composer and pianist
- Hugh Masekela, jazz musician
- Todd Matshikiza, jazz musician and journalist
- Richard Masemola, Anglican priest
- Es'kia Mphahlele, writer, educationist, artist and activist
- Oliver Tambo, anti-apartheid politician and activist, president of the African National Congress

== Notable staff ==
- Trevor Huddleston
- Rowan Smith
- Michael Stern, OBE
- Jeremy Taylor (singer)

== Notes and references ==
- Hinchliff, Peter Bingham (1963). The Anglican Church in South Africa: An Account of the History and Development of the Church of the Province of South Africa. Darton, Longman & Todd.
- Worsnip, Michael E. (1991). Between the two fires: the Anglican Church and apartheid : 1948-1957. University of Natal Press. ISBN 978-0-86980-795-8.
