= Moffat View =

- Location within Gauteng Location within South Africa
- Coordinates: 26.239°S 28.086°E
- Country: South Africa
- Province: Gauteng
- Municipality: City of Johannesburg
- Main Place: Johannesburg

Area
  - Total: 0.43 km^{2} (0.17 sq mi)

Population (2011)
  - Total: 1,918
  - Density: 4,500/km^{2} (12,000/sq mi)

Racial makeup (2011)
  - Black African: 32.7%
  - Coloured: 34.0%
  - Indian/Asian: 9.3%
  - White: 23.3%
  - Other: 0.7%

First languages (2011)
  - Afrikaans: 36.0%
  - English: 32.6%
  - Zulu: 8.9%
  - Xhosa: 4.4%
  - Other: 18.1%
- Time zone: UTC+2 (SAST)
- Postal code (street): 2197

Moffat View is a suburb of Johannesburg, South Africa. The area lies to the south of the Johannesburg CBD. It is located in Region F of the City of Johannesburg Metropolitan Municipality.

== History ==
The suburb is named after John Abram Moffat, an architect. Moffat Park, in the nearby suburb called The Hill is named after him.
