= William Mostert =

South African Anglican bishop

William Mostert was a South African Anglican bishop. He has been the Bishop of Christ the King since his consecration on 25 February 2017. Until his retirement on the 30th of April 2023.

== Notes ==
Anglican Church of Southern Africa titles
Preceded by Peter Lee	Bishop of Christ the King; 2017 –	Incumbent
