= White Angolans =

Ethnic and racial group in Angola

White Angolan
Angolanos Brancos (Portuguese)

Total population
- (Approx. 400,000)

Regions with significant populations
- Luanda

Languages
- Portuguese

Religion
- Christianity (mainly Catholicism) and Judaism

Related ethnic groups
- Portuguese Angolans White Namibians, Afrikaners, German Namibians, Portuguese Mozambicans

White Angolans (Portuguese: Angolanos Brancos) are descendants of European colonial populations, most significantly from Portugal. The vast majority of white settlers in Angola have been of Portuguese ancestry, both in colonial days and today. Germans and Afrikaners settled in southern parts of Angola, with Germans concentrated in Moçamedes and Benguela and Afrikaners concentrated in Huíla Province. Most Afrikaners and Germans left for Namibia and South Africa by 1975. Until 1975 there was a German-language school in Benguela called the Deutsche Schule Benguela. Russians, Ukrainians, Poles, and White Brazilians also make up the population.

Currently, Whites are a minority ethnic group in Angola, accounting for about 1% of the country's population. The White population usually speaks Portuguese.

The majority of white Angolans are of Portuguese ancestry. Some are of German and Dutch stock.

== History ==
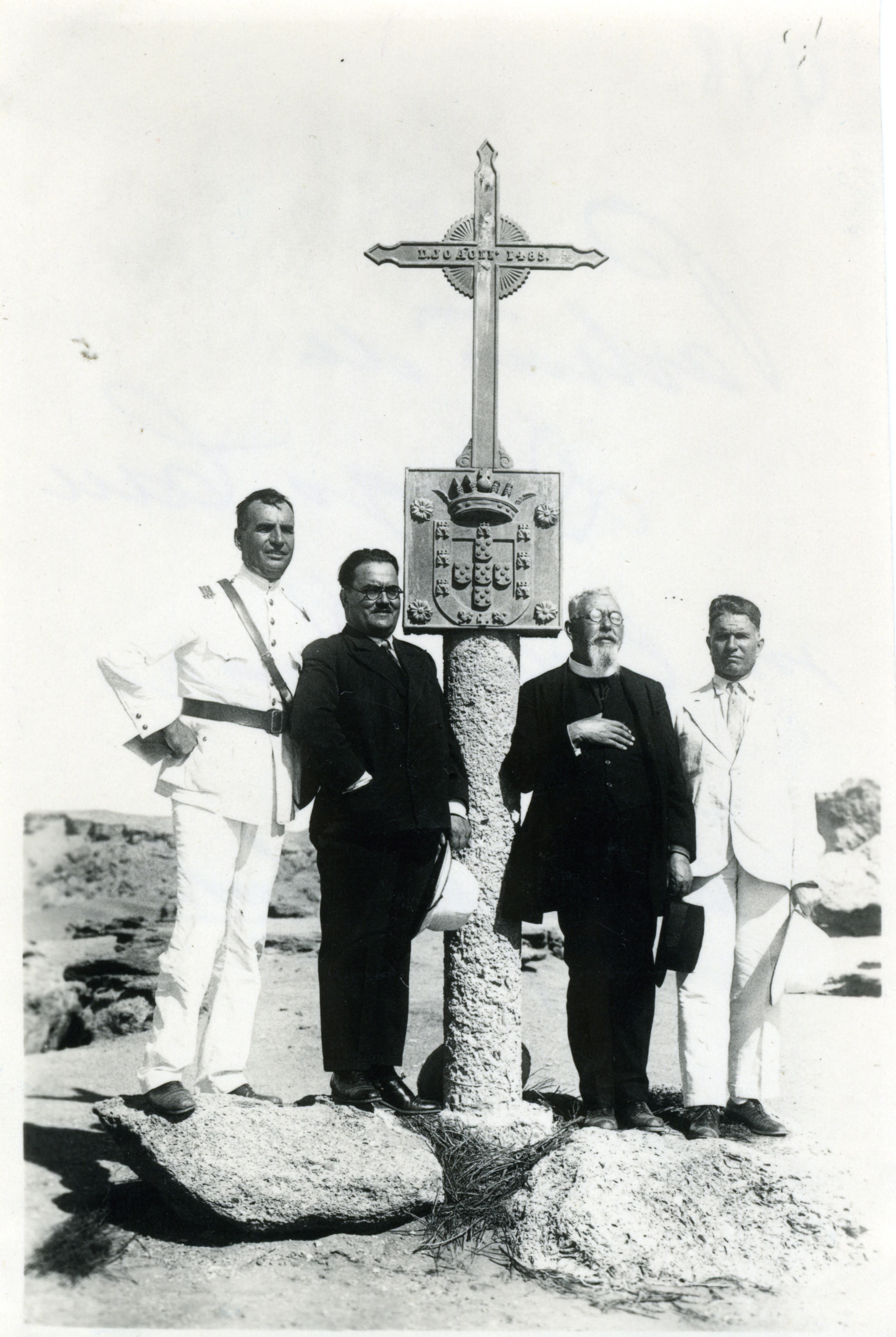
Diogo Cão's padrão at Cabo Negro.

Portuguese explorer Diogo Cão was the first European to discover Angola.

Most white settlers fled Angola after the end of Portuguese rule.

In 2023, a group of eight Mennonite families settled in Angola from a colony in Mexico, near the town of Malanje, becoming the first such settlement on the African continent.

The Portuguese shipped many black slaves from Angola to Portuguese Brazil during the Atlantic slave trade.

== Notable White Angolans ==
- Maria Eugénia Neto, First Lady of Angola (1975–1979)
- Ruth Lara, First Lady of Angola (1979)
- Tatiana Kukanova, First Lady of Angola (1979–1980)
- Pepetela, writer
- José Eduardo Agualusa, writer
- Marga Holness, journalist and diplomat
- Paulo Teixeira Jorge, chemical engineer, diplomat and politician
- Adolfo Maria, politician, writer and journalist
- Iko Carreira, military officer and diplomat
- António Pinto Pereira, politician
- João Ricardo, footballer
- Paulo Figueiredo, footballer
- David Carmo, footballer
- Luís Miguel, football coach and former footballer
- Carlos Fernandes, footballer
- Pedro Pinotes, swimmer
- Salvador Gordo, swimmer
- Santiago Rocha Guimarães, swimmer
- Nyriam Welwitschia Morais, swimmer
- Henrique Mascarenhas, swimmer
- André Matias, rower

== See also ==
- Portuguese Angolans
- German Angolans
- Retornados
- White South Africans
- White Africans
- White Namibians
- Dorsland Trekkers
- History of the Jews in Angola
- Demographics of Angola
- White people in the Democratic Republic of the Congo
- Portuguese Angola – 1575–1975 Portuguese possession in West Africa
