= Richard Masemola =

Anglican priest in South Africa (1921–1981)

Richard Mlokothwa Masemola (17 February 1921 – 20 November 1981) was an Anglican priest in South Africa in the second half of the 20th century. He was born in KwaZulu Natal or Zululand as it was then known. Masemola was the fourth-born of eleven children born to Molatudi Frank and Rhoda Mphangose Masemola.

He was educated at Marrianhill, St. Peter's College, Rosettenville as well as UNISA. He was ordained in 1961. At first he served in Hilton at a small church. Later he served at St Martin's Anglican Church in Edendale, a suburb of Pietermaritzburg in KwaZulu Natal, eventually becoming an Arch Deacon.

Masemola met and married teacher Emelda Themba Ngubane (b. 1927). They had five children; four sons and a daughter. They eventually settled in Caluza, a semi-rural suburb of Pietermaritzburg.

He died at Edendale hospital.
