= The Hill, Gauteng =

The Hill
- Location within Gauteng Location within South Africa
- Coordinates: 26°15′06″S 28°03′41″E
- Country: South Africa
- Province: Gauteng
- Municipality: City of Johannesburg
- Main Place: Johannesburg
- Established: 1919

Area
  - Total: 1.64 km^{2} (0.63 sq mi)

Population (2011)
  - Total: 4,094
  - Density: 2,500/km^{2} (6,470/sq mi)

Racial makeup (2011)
  - Black African: 29.7%
  - Coloured: 8.6%
  - Indian/Asian: 4.7%
  - White: 55.7%
  - Other: 1.2%

First languages (2011)
  - English: 60.8%
  - Afrikaans: 11.3%
  - Zulu: 6.4%
  - Xhosa: 3.9%
  - Other: 17.6%
- Time zone: UTC+2 (SAST)
- Postal code (street): 6525

The Hill is a suburb of Johannesburg, South Africa. The area lies in Johannesburg South and is surrounded by the suburbs of Regents Park, Rosettenville and Linmeyer. It is located in Region F of the City of Johannesburg Metropolitan Municipality.

== History ==
The suburb is situated on part of an old Witwatersrand farm called Klipriviersberg. It was proclaimed as a suburb on 29 January 1919 and its name is derived from the hill it is situated upon.

== Education ==
The Hill High School, a government high school, is located in the area. Another school in the suburb is an independent Anglican school named St. Martin's School. W.H. Coetzer Primary School opened in 1952 and is named after South African artist W.H. Coetzer.

== Parks and green-space ==
Moffat Park lies to east of the suburb, its land donated to the City of Johannesburg by Johan Abram Moffat. On 19 May 1936 the land became a park named after him. The park consists of a portion of land once part of an old Witwatersrand farm called Klipriviersberg. The park, consisting of natural veld, is now earmarked for housing development.

== Infrastructure ==
The suburb is home to South Rand Hospital, which was opened on 18 June 1954 by the Transvaal Administrator Dr William Nicol.
