= Rosettenville =

- Location within Gauteng Location within South Africa
- Coordinates: 26°15′5″S 28°3′19″E
- Country: South Africa
- Province: Gauteng
- Municipality: City of Johannesburg
- Main Place: Johannesburg

Area
  - Total: 2.29 km^{2} (0.88 sq mi)

Population (2011)
  - Total: 17,319
  - Density: 7,560/km^{2} (19,600/sq mi)

Racial makeup (2011)
  - Black African: 77.2%
  - Coloured: 7.0%
  - Indian/Asian: 2.0%
  - White: 12.2%
  - Other: 1.7%

First languages (2011)
  - English: 25.2%
  - Zulu: 18.7%
  - Xhosa: 10.5%
  - Afrikaans: 6.8%
  - Other: 38.8%
- Time zone: UTC+2 (SAST)
- Postal code (street): 2190
- PO box: 2130

Rosettenville is a working class suburb of Johannesburg, South Africa. It lies to the south of the city centre.

== History ==
Rosettenville was founded in 1886 by the Jewish pioneer, Leo (or Levin) Rosettenstein, whom it is named after. Rosettenstein arrived in South Africa from East Prussia and surveyed the land and sold stands after gold was discovered on the Witwatersrand. The area was subsequently developed by his son, A. V. (Ally) Rosettenstein. Some roads are named after his family members. The area began as a refuge for Johannesburg's elites looking to escape the chaos and noise of the newly minted mining town. By the 1920s the suburb had become home to a working class population of English and Afrikaans speaking South Africans. For much of its history the area maintained a largely “white” demographic profile, as the Group Areas Act did not allow for legal racially mixed residential areas.

Between 1924 and 1972, over 50 000 white Portuguese-speaking immigrants moved to the Greater Rosettenville area, mostly from Portugal, but also from Madeira and Mozambique, which was then a Portuguese colony. After Angola and Mozambique gained independence from Portugal in 1975 and 1976, many White Angolans and more white Mozambicans moved to South Africa, and many of them settled in Rosettenville. The area became known as 'Little Portugal', with residents celebrating their shared heritage in a number of ways including food and festivals. 10 June, Portugal Day was also celebrated there.

The first ever Nando's restaurant was opened in Rosettenville in 1987. Sheila Camerer grew up in the suburb and was Member of Parliament for the constituency between 1987–1994, representing the National Party. The Conservative Party made a breakthrough in the suburb, garnering about 30% of the vote in the 1984 by-election. Thus showing some expansion beyond its rural, Afrikaner power base to the predominantly English-speaking Rosettenville. Rosettenville had been described by a National Party spokesman as 'the safest N.P. seat in the country,' however its fortunes changed and by the time of a local election in 1998 it polled only 10 percent against 88 percent by the Democratic Party candidate.

In a historic occasion, Nelson Mandela, recently released from prison, met with Jewish leaders at the suburb's long-established South Eastern Hebrew Congregation, an Orthodox synagogue in June 1990. The congregation was established in 1908, and Eastern European Jewish immigrants brought with them Torah scrolls from 1820 for the congregation's use. Initially the congregation held Shabbat services and minor festivals in a private house belonging to a local Jewish man, Mr Weiss. This was the eventual location of the synagogue building that was constructed in the late 1920s. Mr Weiss' home was struck by a tornado in 1928 and rather than repairing his house, he sold the property to the congregation. The Jewish congregation in the area reached its peak in 1957 when 600 attended the following year's Golden Jubilee with Johannesburg's Jewish mayor, Ian Maltz officiating. The synagogue was bombed in July 1990, weeks after Mandela's visit, by right-wing extremists and defaced with antisemitic graffiti. The synagogue closed in 2008 due to dwindling numbers of the local Jewish population and it now operates as a church.

Since the repeal of the Group Areas Act in 1991 and the end of apartheid, new migrants from Southern African Development Community countries (mostly non-white migrants from Angola and Mozambique) have settled in the area, while older residents have moved to the northern suburbs. Often this was to be closer to their adult children that had moved to more desirable areas of the city. Nigerian residents, accused of drug use and prostitution, were attacked during the 2019 Johannesburg riots.

Rosettenville is famously known as a place where the celebrated Anglican school, St Peter's College, where the likes of ANC President Oliver Tambo, Archbishop Desmond Tutu, Jonas Gwangwa, Hugh Masekela, Peter Abrahams, Henry Makgothi and others did part of their high school education. St Peter's College later became St. Martin's School (Rosettenville).

Rosettenville is also known as the place where reggae musician Lucky Dube was shot dead in front of his children in October 2007.

== Places of interest ==
- St. Mary's Anglican Church, Rosettenville
- South Eastern Hebrew Congregation (1908–2018), now serves as a church of the Christian Congregation in South Africa
- Wemmer Pan
- St Benedict’s House, Anglican retreat house

== See also ==
- Portuguese South Africans
- Nandos
