= Germans in France =

Ethnic group in France

- Hybrid flag of France and Germany

Total population
- c. 130,000 (2012)

Languages
- French, German

German emigration to France has resulted in it being the home of one of the largest communities of German population born outside Germany. Migration from Germany to France has increased rapidly from the 1990s onwards; by 2012, there were an estimated 130,000 German citizens living in France.

== See also ==
- German diaspora
- France–Germany relations
