= Peter Lee (bishop of Christ the King) =

The Right Reverend Peter Lee
- Retired Bishop of Christ the King
- Church: Anglican
- Province: Southern Africa
- Diocese: Christ the King
- Installed: 1990
- Term ended: 2016

Peter John Lee (born 5 June 1947) is a retired South African Anglican bishop. He was bishop of the Diocese of Christ the King, Johannesburg.

Educated at Gresham's School, Holt, Norfolk, the Hotchkiss School in Connecticut and St. John's College, Cambridge, Lee was ordained in the Church of England and has worked in South Africa since 1976.

Lee worked with Archbishop Desmond Tutu as canon missioner of the Anglican diocese of Johannesburg before being elected as bishop of the new Diocese of Christ the King. He retired in June 2016. The electoral college whose job it was to elect a successor failed to do so. The synod of bishops of the Anglican Church of Southern Africa appointed a successor at their meeting in 2016.

== Works ==
- Poor Man, Rich Man: The Priorities of Jesus and the Agenda of the Church. Hodder and Stoughton. 1986. ISBN 978-0-340-39305-5.
- Guard her children: hope for South Africa today. Kingsway. 1986. ISBN 978-0-86065-427-8.
- Compromise and courage: Anglicans in Johannesburg 1864-1999 : a divided church seeking integrity. Pietermaritzburg: Cluster. 2005. ISBN 978-1-875053-50-6.

== Honours ==
- Lambeth degree of Bachelor of Divinity, 13 July 2006.

== Notes and references ==
- Shayi, Frank (August 1987), "Guard her children: hope for South Africa today by Peter Lee", ThirdWay, vol. 10, Hymns Ancient & Modern Ltd
- Williams, Rowan (14 July 2006). "Archbishop of Canterbury awards Lambeth Degrees". Archbishop of Canterbury (Press release). Archived from the original on 21 July 2006.

Anglican Church of Southern Africa titles
New diocese	Bishop of Christ the King; 1990–2016	Succeeded by William Mostert
