= MediathekView =

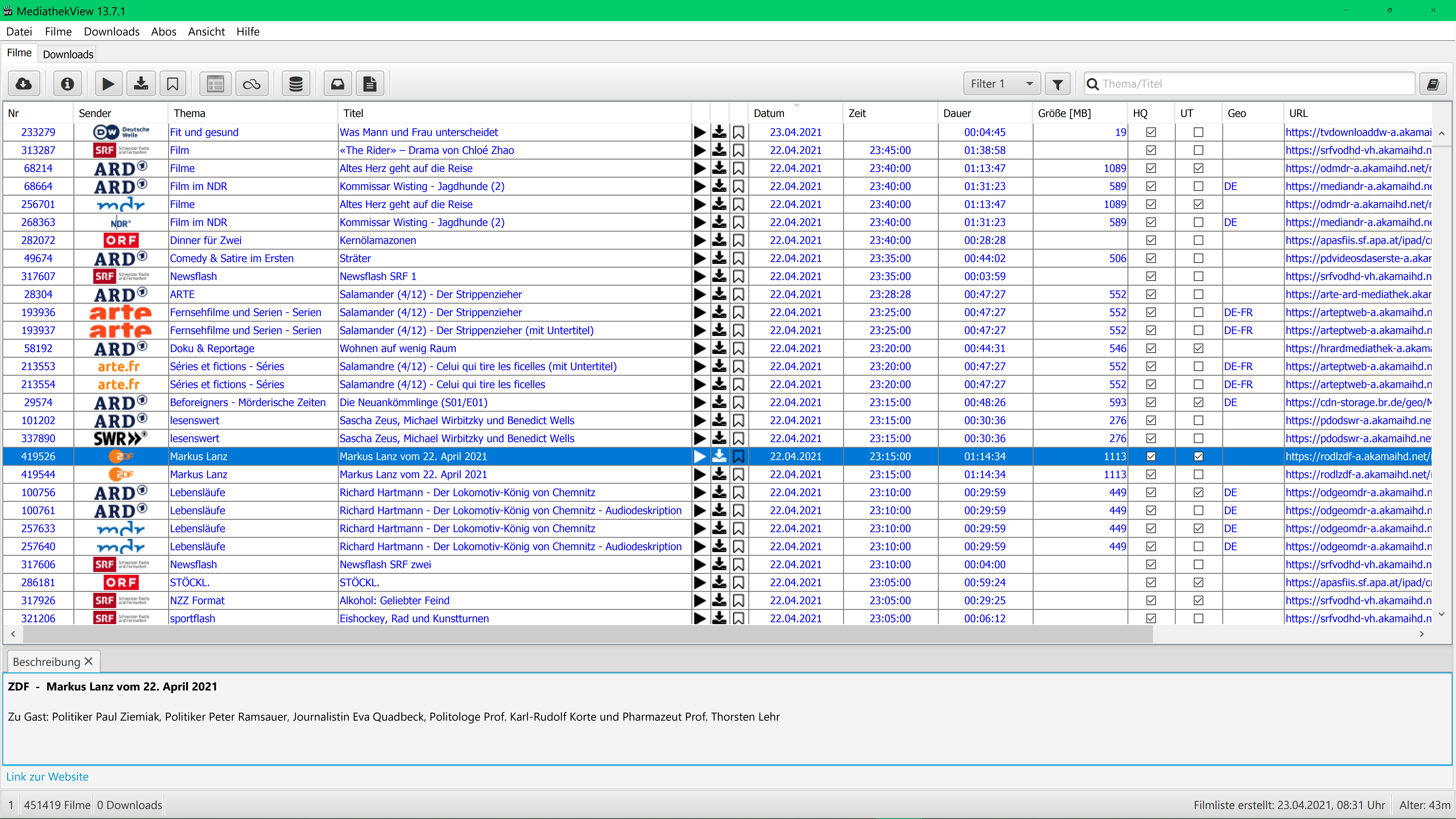
- Developers: xaver_w and community
- Stable release: 14.4.0 / 28 October 2025
- Repository: github.com/mediathekview/MediathekView
- Written in: Java
- Operating system: Windows, Linux, macOS
- Platform: x86-64
- Available in: German
- Type: Broadcast downloader
- License: GPLv3
- Website: mediathekview.de

MediathekView is a free open-source software designed to manage the online multimedia libraries of several German public broadcasters as well as an Austrian, a Swiss and a Franco-German public broadcaster. The software comes with a German user interface that lists broadcasts available online. In October 2016, the developer announced that maintenance of the project would be discontinued at the end of the year. Three weeks later, the user community had formed a team to continue the project, and the software continues to remain open-source.

== Functionality ==
Written in Java, the software searches for copies of broadcasts online and allows search results to be narrowed down using filters. The videos can be viewed online or downloaded. Any video player on a computer can be used for viewing and downloading. Channels can be subscribed to, allowing new broadcasts to be downloaded automatically.

== Broadcast Channels ==
Supported are Das Erste, ZDF, Arte, KIKA, 3sat, SWR, BR, MDR, NDR, WDR, hr, rbb, DW, ORF, SRF.
