= Diocese of Christ the King =

Diocese of the Anglican Church of Southern Africa

The Diocese of Christ the King is a diocese of the Anglican Church of Southern Africa in the southern part of Gauteng province, South Africa.

The diocese has four archdeaconries, the Archdeaconry of St Peter, the Archdeaconry of Kliprivier, the Archdeaconry of Sebokeng with Evaton and the Archdeaconry of the Vaal.

== History ==
The diocese was founded in 1990. It comprises Sharpeville, Vereeniging, Boipatong, Vanderbijlpark, Sebokeng and the southern side of the city of Johannesburg.

The diocese is the area between the Vaal Triangle—where Sharpeville, Vereeniging, Boipatong, Vanderbijlpark and Sebokeng are found—and the southern side of the city of Johannesburg. The diocese is small in size, being only 80 kilometres (50 mi) long and half that wide, but rapid urbanisation has resulted in significant growth in parishes. Just over half of these churches have a recognisable church building in which to worship. The rest meet in garages, shacks or the open air. One of the latest new congregations worships in French and aims to welcome refugees from the Congo and other Francophone African countries.

The diocese has links of varying degrees of formality with the Episcopal Diocese of Virginia (ECUSA), the Diocese of Bujumbura, the Diocese of Mauritius, the Church of North India and the Church of South India. The Diocese of Christ the King is part of the Community of the Cross of Nails. Locally, the diocese enjoys a close relationship with the Anglican Diocese of St Mark the Evangelist, with youth from Christ Church, Polokwane, and elsewhere, attending the "A re roriseng ("Let us worship") conference each year in Rosettenville.

== List of bishops ==
- Peter Lee 1990–2016.
- William Mostert was named by the synod of bishops of the Anglican Church of Southern Africa as the bishop-elect and has since been consecrated and enthroned.
- Mkhuseli Sobantwana 2023

== Coat of arms ==
Arms of the Diocese of Christ the King

The diocese registered a coat of arms at the Bureau of Heraldry in 1990 : Azure, a Chrismon Argent ensigned with a celestial crown Or; the shield ensigned with a mitre proper.
