= German Angolans =

German Angolans Angola-Deutsche
Total population
- 1,400 (1930)

Regions with significant populations
- Benguela, Moçâmedes, Calulo, Luanda

Languages
- German, Portuguese

Religion
- Christianity

Related ethnic groups
- German Brazilians, German Namibians, German South Africans, Afrikaners

German Angolans are the descendants of German settlers in the nation of Angola.

German immigrants to Portuguese Angola started to appear in the mid-19th century. They took part in the founding and initial growth of the coastal city of Moçâmedes in the 1850s.

More German immigrants came to Angola in the 20th century, with about 1,400 immigrating between 1915 and 1930. After Angolan independence and the subsequent civil war that occurred, most German Angolans left the county for Europe (both Germany & Portugal, depending on their choice), though some families remain, mainly in the town of Calulo, as well as the capital, Luanda. Other German Angolans left for Namibia, which was a German territory and where the remaining colonial German population lives and Portuguese and black Angolan refugees also left for, & others along with Portuguese settlers and black Angolans left for Portuguese-speaking country of Brazil, where there is a visible presence of German population & culture and where the largest German population outside Germany lives.

Until 1975, there was a German-language school in Benguela called the Deutsche Schule Benguela.

In 2023, a group of eight Low German Mennonite families settled in Angola from a colony in Mexico, near the town of Malanje, becoming the first such settlement on the African continent.

== Notable German Angolans ==
- Ruth Lara, First Lady of Angola (1979)

== See also ==
- Angola–Germany relations
- Portuguese Angolans
- White Africans
- White Namibians
- Dorsland Trekkers
