= Economy of Zimbabwe =

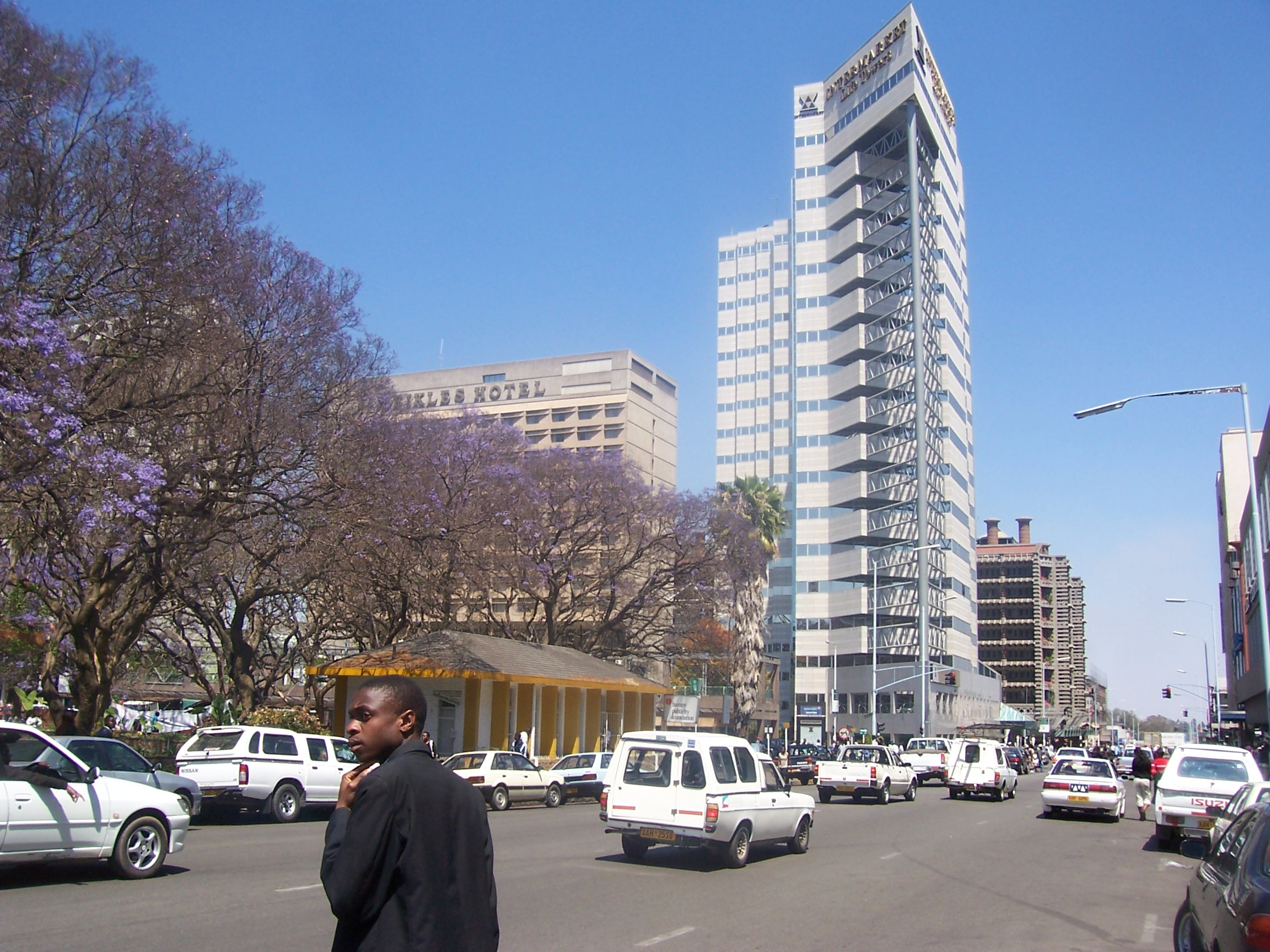
- Sam Nujoma Street in Harare
- Currency: Zimbabwe Gold
- Fiscal year: calendar year
- Trade organisations: AU, AfCFTA, WTO, SADC, COMESA
- Country group: Developing/Emerging; Lower-middle income economy

Statistics
- Population: ▲17,334,257 (2026)
- GDP: ▲$66 billion (nominal; 2026); ▲$150 billion (PPP; 2026)
- GDP rank: 93rd (nominal; 2025); 93rd (PPP; 2025)
- GDP growth: 2.0% (2024); 6.0% (2025)
- GDP per capita: ▲$3,882 (nominal; 2026); ▲$8,823 (PPP; 2026)
- GDP per capita rank: 149th (nominal; 2025); 151st (PPP; 2025)
- GDP per capita growth: -0.1% (2024)
- GDP by sector: agriculture: 12%; industry: 22.2%; services: 65.8%; (2017 est.)
- Inflation (CPI): 172.2% (2023 est.)
- Population below national poverty line: 1.0% (2017); 1.0% on less than $3.20/day (2017)
- Gini coefficient: 45.5 medium (2019)
- Human Development Index: ▲0.598 medium (2023) (150th); 0.598 low IHDI (2023)
- Labour force: ▲6,560,725 (2023); 79.3% employment rate (2026)
- Labour force by occupation: agriculture: 67.5%; industry: 7.3%; services: 25.2%; (2017 est.)
- Unemployment: 20.7% (2026 est.)
- Main industries: mining (coal, gold, platinum, copper, nickel, tin, clay, numerous metallic and non-metallic ores), steel; wood products, cement, chemicals, fertilizer, clothing and footwear, foodstuffs, beverages, cattle, cows

External
- Exports: ▲$16.5 billion (2025 est.)
- Export goods: platinum, cotton, tobacco, gold, ferroalloys, textiles/clothing
- Main export partners: South Africa(+) 41.0%; United Arab Emirates(+) 32.0%; China(+) 8.86%; Belgium(+) 3.26%; Mozambique(+) 2.89%; (2022)
- Imports: ▲$10.2 billion (2025 est.)
- Import goods: machinery and transport equipment, other manufactures, chemicals, fuels, food products
- Main import partners: South Africa(+) 40.0%; China(+) 13.9%; Singapore(+) 13.6%; (2022)
- FDI stock: ▲$8.4 billion (31 December 2025 est.); ▲ Abroad: $964.5 million (31 December 2025 est.)
- Current account: ▲$1.4 billion (2026 est.)
- Gross external debt: ▲$14.01 billion (23 February 2023)

Public finance
- Government debt: ▼44.7% of GDP (2026 est.)
- Foreign reserves: ▲$1.7 billion (21 August 2026 est.)
- Budget balance: −0.03% (of GDP) (2026 est.)
- Revenue: ZWG288 billion (proposed for 2026); US$11.2 billion (official rate $1:25.71 (Jan 2026)); US$9.44 billion (parallel market $1:30.5 (Jan 2026))
- Spending: $11.28 billion (2026 est.)
- Economic aid: recipient: $500 million; note – the EU and the US provide food aid on humanitarian grounds (2026 est.)
- All values, unless otherwise stated, are in US dollars.

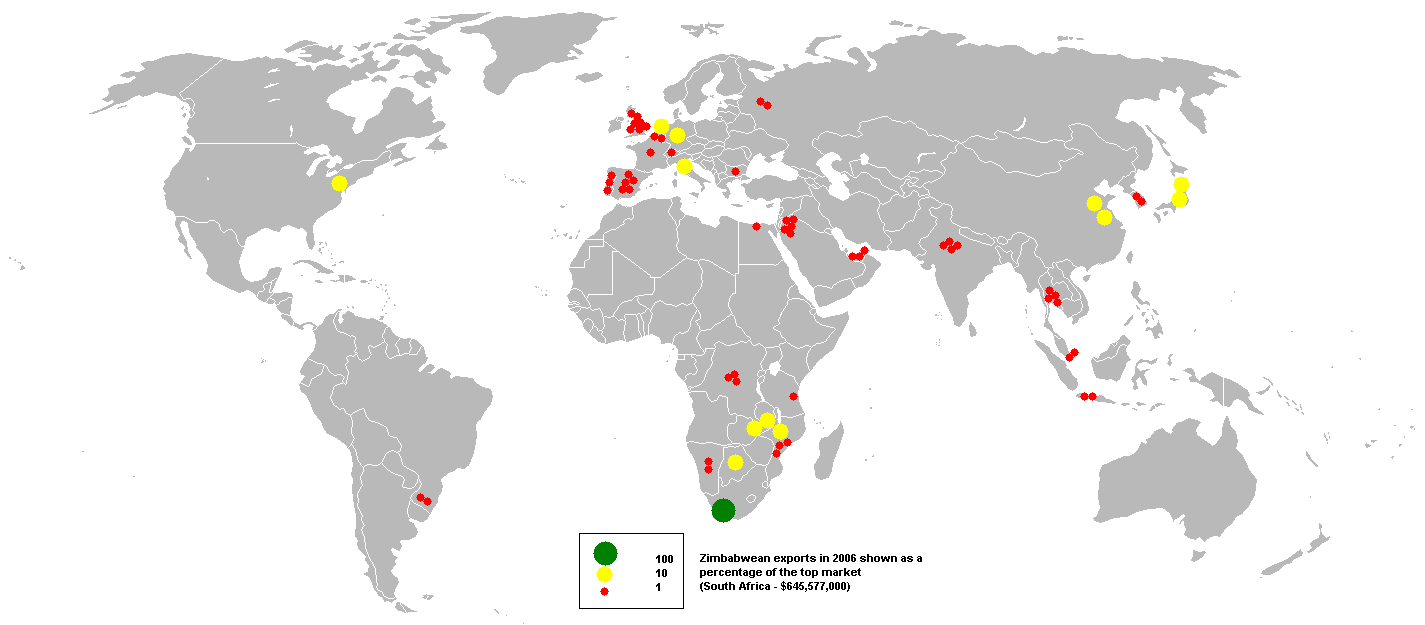
Zimbabwean exports in 2006

Zimbabwe has a developing economy. It generates $149.68 billion within its formal economy in PPP terms which translates to 35.9% of the total economy. Agriculture and mining largely contribute to exports.

The country has reserves of metallurgical-grade chromite. Other commercial mineral deposits include coal, diamonds, lithium, asbestos, copper, nickel, gold, platinum and iron ore.

Since the end of the civil war in 1980, Zimbabwe has had a tumultuous economy, going from Africa's breadbasket to a country where, as of March 2025, over one-third of its population is facing food insecurity.

== The sweeping impact of land reform ==
In 2000, Zimbabwe launched a controversial land reform that, over the next decade, would seize about 6,000 large, white-owned farms and convert them into over 168,000 black-owned farms. Many of the new occupants, mainly consisting of landless black citizens and several prominent members of the ruling ZANU-PF administration, were inexperienced or uninterested in farming, thereby failing to retain the labour-intensive, highly efficient management of previous landowners, triggering severe export losses.

This policy of widespread seizure of private land and property spooked international investors and negatively affected market confidence. The US and other nations slapped sanctions on government officials due to the human rights abuses attributable to the land reform. Many sanctions continue to this day.

In this time, between 1999–2008, Zimbabwe's GDP shrunk by nearly half — the most severe downturn in a country not at war in recorded history.

== Hyperinflation and currency changes ==
Between 2003–2006, the Reserve Bank of Zimbabwe began printing money at an extreme rate, causing inflation to spike by a factor of 1,000. By the middle of 2008, Zimbabwe hit a breaking point. Inflation hit 89.7 sextillion percent — a $100 trillion bill didn't even cover a bus fare.

Shortly afterwards, the government introduced a multi-currency system, making U.S. dollars, and other currencies legal tender. The Zimbabwe dollar, now nearly worthless, disappeared from circulation.

After a period of relative economic stability, the government reintroduced local currency again in 2019, and quickly faced challenges in maintaining its value. At the time of its reintroduction, one loaf of bread cost between 2 and 3 Zimbabwean dollars. By 2024, the price had risen to 24,000 Zimbabwean dollars, roughly equivalent to 1 United States dollar. Although the U.S. dollar remains officially tolerated, many vendors are reluctant to accept payments in local currency due to its instability.

In April 2024, the government launched a new currency, Zimbabwe Gold (ZiG), to replace the Zimbabwean dollar. Claimed to be backed by the country's reserves of foreign currency and precious metals, primarily gold, the new currency aimed to curb inflation by preventing excessive money printing and to restore price stability. While ZiG has lost more than 95% of its value as of November 2025, the government continues to encourage its use. From April 2026 new banknotes will be issued to address complaints made about security and their previous tendency to wear.

== Current economic conditions ==
Government spending is 29.7% of GDP. State enterprises are strongly subsidized. Taxes and tariffs are high, and state regulation is costly to companies. Starting or closing a business is slow and costly. Due to the regulations of the labour market, hiring and terminating workers is a lengthy process. By 2008, an unofficial estimate of unemployment had risen to 94%.

As of 2023, Zimbabwe's official unemployment rate stood at 9.3%, (Note: This can also be supported by employment websites in Zimbabwe like Work In Zimbabwe which posts several Jobs in Zimbabwe daily.) though the vast majority of workers are in the informal sector, made up of low-paying, temporary and precarious jobs.

A 2014 report by the Africa Progress Panel found that, of all the African countries examined when determining how many years it would take to double per capita GDP, Zimbabwe fared the worst, and that at its current rate of development it would take 190 years for the country to double its per capita GDP. Uncertainty around the indigenisation programme (compulsory acquisition), the perceived lack of a free press, the possibility of abandoning the US dollar as official currency, and political uncertainty following the end of the government of national unity with the MDC as well as power struggles within ZANU-PF have increased concerns that the country's economic situation could further deteriorate.

In September 2016 the finance minister identified "low levels of production and the attendant trade gap, insignificant foreign direct investment and lack of access to international finance due to huge arrears" as significant causes for the poor performance of the economy.

Zimbabwe came 140 out of 190 ease of doing business report released by the World Bank Group. They were ranked high for ability to get credit (ranked 85) and protecting minority investors (ranked 95).

== Economic sectors ==
=== Agriculture ===
Agriculture in Zimbabwe can be divided into two parts: commercial farming of crops such as cotton, tobacco, coffee, peanuts and various fruits, and subsistence farming with staple crops, such as maize or wheat.

Commercial farming was almost exclusively in the hands of the white minority until the controversial land redistribution program began in 2000. Land in Zimbabwe was forcibly seized from white farmers and redistributed to black settlers, justified by Mugabe on the grounds that it was meant to rectify inequalities left over from colonialism. The new owners did not have land titles, and as such did not have the collateral necessary to access bank loans. The small-scale farmers also did not have experience with commercial-scale agriculture.

After land redistribution, much of Zimbabwe's land went fallow, and agricultural production decreased steeply. The University of Zimbabwe estimated in 2008 that between 2000 and 2007 agricultural production decreased by 51%. Production of tobacco, Zimbabwe's main export crop, decreased by 79% from 2000 to 2008.

Tobacco production recovered after 2008 thanks to the contract system of agriculture and growing Chinese demand. International tobacco companies, such as British American Tobacco and China Tobacco, supplied farmers with agricultural inputs, equipment, and loans, and supervised them in growing tobacco. By 2018, tobacco production had recovered to 258 million kg, the second largest crop on record. Instead of large white-owned farms selling mostly to European and American companies, Zimbabwe's tobacco sector now consists of small black-owned farms exporting over half of the crop to China. Tobacco farming accounted for 11% of Zimbabwe's GDP in 2017, and 3 million of its 16 million people depended on tobacco for their livelihood.

Land reform has found considerable support in Africa and a few supporters among African-American activists, but Jesse Jackson commented during a visit to South Africa in June 2006, "Land redistribution has long been a noble goal to achieve but it has to be done in a way that minimises trauma. The process has to attract investors rather than scare them away. What is required in Zimbabwe is democratic rule, democracy is lacking in the country and that is the major cause of this economic meltdown."

Zimbabwe produced, in 2018:

- 3,3 million tons of sugarcane;
- 730 thousand tons of maize;
- 256 thousand tons of cassava;
- 191 thousand tons of vegetable;
- 132 thousand tons of tobacco (6th largest producer in the world);
- 106 thousand tons of banana;
- 96 thousand tons of orange;
- 90 thousand tons of soy;
- 80 thousand tons of sorghum;
- 60 thousand tons of potato;
- 55 thousand tons of barley;
- 42 thousand tons of peanut;
- 38 thousand tons of cotton;

In addition to smaller productions of other agricultural products.

=== Mining sector ===
As other southern African countries, Zimbabwean soil is rich in raw materials, namely platinum, coal, iron ore, and gold. Recently, diamonds have also been found in considerable deposits. Copper, chromite and nickel deposits also exist, though in lesser amounts. The Marange diamond fields, discovered in 2006 are thought to be among the richest in the world.

In March 2011, the government of Zimbabwe implemented laws which required local ownership of mining companies; following this news, there were falls in the share prices of companies with mines in Zimbabwe.

Gold production year	kg
1998	27,114
2007	7,017
2015	18,400

Various NGOs reported that the diamond sector in Zimbabwe is rife with corruption; a November 2012 report by NGO Reap What You Sow revealed a huge lack of transparency of diamond revenues and asserted that Zimbabwe's elite are benefiting from the country's diamonds. This followed former South African President Thabo Mbeki’s warning days earlier that Zimbabwe needed to stop its "predatory elite" from colluding with mining companies for their own benefit. Also in that month, the Associated Press reported that at least $2 billion worth of diamonds had been stolen from Zimbabwe's eastern diamond fields and had enriched Mugabe's ruling circle and various connected gem dealers and criminals.

In January 2013, Zimbabwe's mineral exports totalled $1.8 billion.

As of October 2014, Metallon Corporation was Zimbabwe's largest gold miner. The group is controlled by its Chairman Mzi Khumalo.

In 2019, the country was the world's 3rd largest producer of platinum and the 6th largest world producer of lithium. In the production of gold, in 2017 the country produced 23.9 tons.

=== Science and technology ===
Zimbabwe's Second Science and Technology Policy (2012) cites sectorial policies with a focus on biotechnology, information and communication technologies (ICTs), space sciences, nanotechnology, indigenous knowledge systems, technologies yet to emerge and scientific solutions to emergent environmental challenges. The policy makes provisions for establishing a National Nanotechnology Programme.

Zimbabwe has a National Biotechnology Policy which dates from 2005. Despite poor infrastructure and a lack of both human and financial resources, biotechnology research is better established in Zimbabwe than in most sub-Saharan countries, even if it tends to use primarily traditional techniques.

The Second Science and Technology Policy asserts the government commitment to allocating at least 1% of GDP to research and development, focusing at least 60% of university education on developing skills in science and technology and ensuring that school pupils devote at least 30% of their time to studying science subjects.

=== Education ===
The state of education in Zimbabwe affects the development of the economy while the state of the economy can affect access and quality of teachers and education. Zimbabwe has one of Africa's highest literacy rates at over 90%. The crisis since 2000 has, however, diminished these achievements because of a lack of resources and the exodus of teachers and specialists (e.g. doctors, scientists, engineers) to other countries. Also, the start of the new curriculum in primary and secondary sections has affected the state of the once strong education sector.

== Infrastructure ==
=== Transportation ===
Zimbabwe's internal transportation and electrical power networks are adequate; nevertheless, maintenance has been ignored for several years. Zimbabwe is crossed by two trans-African automobile routes: the Cairo-Cape Town Highway and the Beira-Lobito Highway. Poorly paved highways connect the major urban and industrial areas, while rail lines controlled by the National Railways of Zimbabwe connect Zimbabwe to a vast central African railroad network that connects it to all of its neighbors.

=== Energy ===
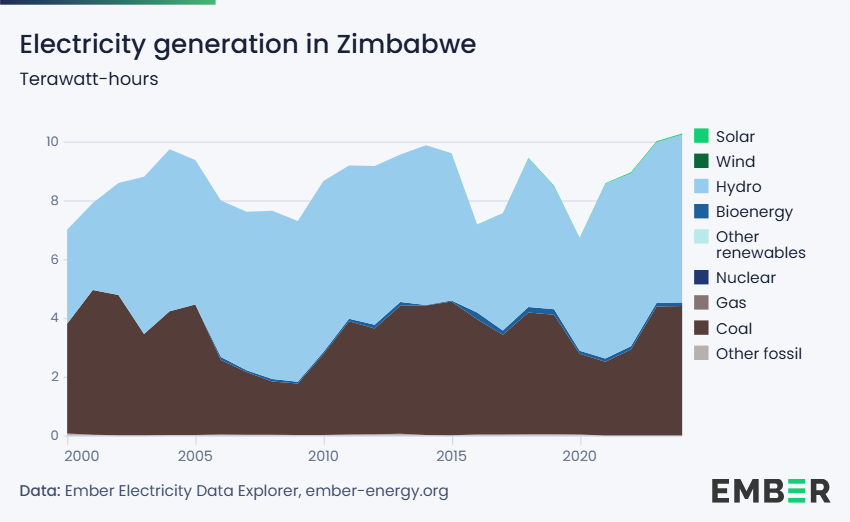
Electricity generation in Zimbabwe in terawatt-hours

The Zimbabwe Electricity Supply Authority is responsible for providing the country with electrical energy. Zimbabwe has two larger facilities for the generation of electrical power, the Kariba Dam (owned together with Zambia) and since 1983 by large Hwange Thermal Power Station adjacent to the Hwange coal field. However, total generation capacity does not meet the demand, leading to rolling blackouts. The Hwange station is not capable of using its full capacity due to old age and maintenance neglect. In 2006, crumbling infrastructure and lack of spare parts for generators and coal mining lead to Zimbabwe importing 40% of its power, including 100 megawatts from the Democratic Republic of Congo, 200 megawatts from Mozambique, up to 450 from South Africa, and 300 megawatts from Zambia. In May 2010 the country's generation power was an estimated 940MW against a peak demand of 2500MW. Use of local small scale generators is widespread.

=== Telephone ===
New telephone lines used to be difficult to obtain. With TelOne, however, Zimbabwe has only one fixed line service provider. Cellular phone networks are an alternative. Principal mobile phone operators are Telecel, Net*One, and Econet.

== Macroeconomic statistics ==
Exports of Zimbabwe by product category (2019) Chemical products Transportation Machines Mineral products Plastics and rubbers Metals Foodstuffs Precious metals Textiles Instruments Animal products Vegetable products Paper goods Footwear and headwear Miscellaneous Stone and glass Wood products Animal and vegetable bi-products Animal hides Arts and antiques Weapons

The following table shows the main economic indicators in 1990–2023. Inflation under 10% is in green.

Year	GDP (in bn. US$PPP)	GDP per capita (in US$ PPP)	GDP (in bn. US$nominal)	GDP per capita (in US$ nominal)	GDP growth (real)	Inflation rate (in Percent)	Government debt (in % of GDP)
1990	n/a	n/a	10.1	1,037	n/a	n/a	n/a
1991	n/a	n/a	▼9.5	▼936	n/a	n/a	n/a
1992	n/a	n/a	▼7.8	▼749	n/a	n/a	n/a
1993	n/a	n/a	▼7.6	▼702	n/a	n/a	n/a
1994	n/a	n/a	▲8.0	▲714	n/a	n/a	n/a
1995	n/a	n/a	▲8.3	▲717	n/a	n/a	n/a
1996	n/a	n/a	▲10.1	▲850	n/a	n/a	n/a
1997	n/a	n/a	▲10.4	▲881	n/a	n/a	n/a
1998	33.1	2,813	▲12.1	▲1,029	n/a	n/a	n/a
1999	▲33.2	▲2,829	▼11.8	▼1,004	▼−1.1%	n/a	n/a
2000	▼32.5	▼2,778	▼11.3	▼970	▼−4.2%	n/a	n/a
2001	▲33.1	▲2,835	▼11.2	▼964	▼−0.5%	n/a	n/a
2002	▼31.0	▼2,664	▼10.7	▼923	▼−7.7%	n/a	n/a
2003	▼26.5	▼2,274	▼9.6	▼822	▼−16.2%	n/a	n/a
2004	▼25.5	▼2,172	▼9.5	▼807	▼−6.3%	n/a	n/a
2005	▼24.3	▼2,057	▼9.0	▼765	▼−7.4%	n/a	33.1%
2006	▼24.2	▼2,014	▼8.1	▼678	▼−3.6%	n/a	▲39.4%
2007	▼24.0	▼1,993	▼7.8	▼647	▼−3.4%	n/a	▲44.7%
2008	▼20.5	▼1,689	▼6.7	▼553	▼−16.3%	n/a	▲61.1%
2009	▲22.1	▲1,809	▲9.7	▲790	▲7.4%	n/a	▼58.7%
2010	▲26.9	▲2,176	▲12.0	▲976	▲20.0%	n/a	▼47.6%
2011	▲31.3	▲2,512	▲14.1	▲1,132	▲14.2%	▲3.5%	▼42.9%
2012	▲37.2	▲2,848	▲17.1	▲1,310	▲16.7%	▲3.7%	▼38.4%
2013	▲38.6	▲2,875	▲19.1	▲1,422	▲2.1%	▲1.6%	▼37.0%
2014	▲40.2	▲2,919	▲19.5	▼1,415	▲2.4%	▼−0.2%	▲42.3%
2015	▲41.3	▲2,937	▲20.0	▲1,418	▲1.8%	▼−2.4%	▲48.0%
2016	▲42.1	▼2,926	▲20.5	▲1,430	▲0.8%	▼−1.6%	▲49.9%
2017	▲45.0	▲3,070	▲22.0	▲1,503	▲5.2%	▲0.9%	▲68.9%
2018	▼42.5	▼2,839	▲36.9	▲2,467	▲5.0%	▲10.6%	▼48.1%
2019	▲49.6	▲3,252	▼26.0	▼1,705	▼−6.3%	▲255.3%	▲82.3%
2020	▲54.5	▲3,500	▲26.9	▲1,725	▼−7.8%	▲557.2%	▲84.5%
2021	▲66.5	▲4,183	▲36.0	▲2,265	▲8.5%	▲98.5%	▼58.2%
2022	▲75.6	▲4,661	▼32.5	▼2,004	▲6.1%	▲193.4%	▲102.1%
2023	▲82.5	▲4,965	▲35.2	▲2,119	▲5.3%	▲667.4%	▼96.7%
2024	▲86.2	▲5,071	▲35.9	▼2,114	▲2.0%	▲635.3%	▼70.3%

== History ==
Zimbabwe's GDP annual percentage growth rate from 1980 to 2010.

In 1997, Zimbabwe's economic decline began to visibly take place. It began with the crash of the stock market on November 14, 1997. Civil society groups began to agitate for their rights as these had been eroded under ESAP. In 1997 alone, 232 strikes were recorded, the largest number in any year since independence (Kanyenze 2004). During the first half of 1997, the war veterans organized themselves and demonstrations that were initially ignored by the government. As the intensity of the strikes grew, the government was forced to pay the war veterans a once-off gratuity of ZWD $50,000 by December 31, 1997, and a monthly pension of US$2,000 beginning January 1998 (Kanyenze 2004). To raise money for this unbudgeted expense, the government tried to introduce a ‘war veterans’ levy,’ but they faced much opposition from the labor force and had to effectively borrow money to meet these obligations. Following the massive depreciation of the Zimbabwean dollar in 1997, the cost of agricultural inputs soared, undermining the viability of the producers who in turn demanded that the producer price of maize (corn) be raised. Millers then hiked prices by 24 percent in January 1998 by 24 percent and the consequent increase in the price of maize meal triggered nation-wide riots during the last month. The government intervened by introducing price controls on all basic commodities (Kanyenze 2004). Multiple interventionist moves were undertaken to try to reverse some of the negative effects of the Structural Adjustment Programs and to try to strengthen the private sector that was suffering from decreasing output and increasing competition from cheap imported products. Some of the most detrimental policies that followed include:

GDP per capita

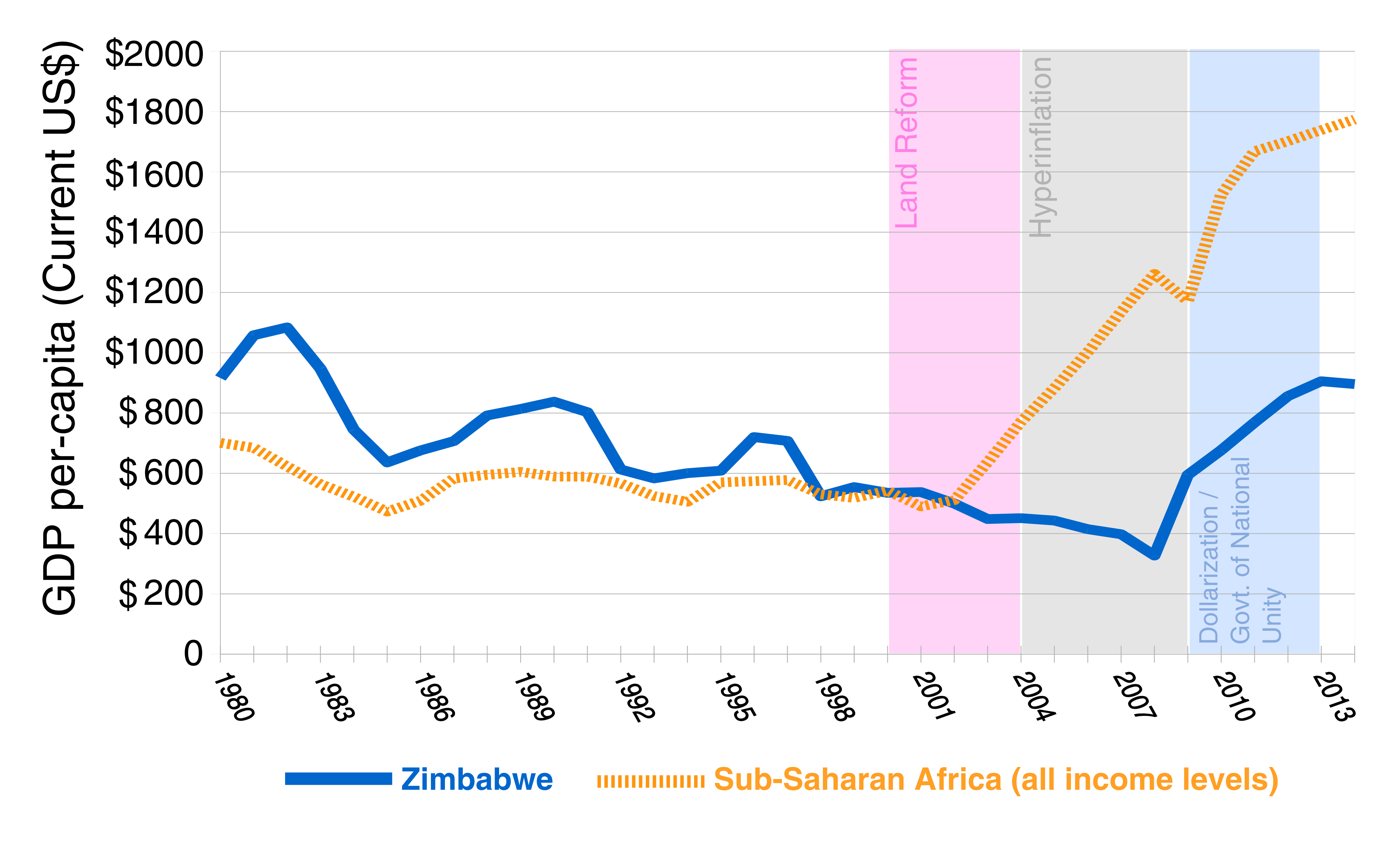
GDP per capita in current US dollars from 1980 to 2014. The graph compares Zimbabwe (blue ) and all of Sub-Saharan Africa's (yellow ) GDP per capita. Different periods in Zimbabwe's recent economic history such as the land reform period (pink ), hyperinflation (grey ), and the dollarization/government of national unity period (light blue ) are also highlighted. It shows that economic activity declined in Zimbabwe over the period that the land reforms took place whilst the rest of Africa rapidly overtook the country in the same period.

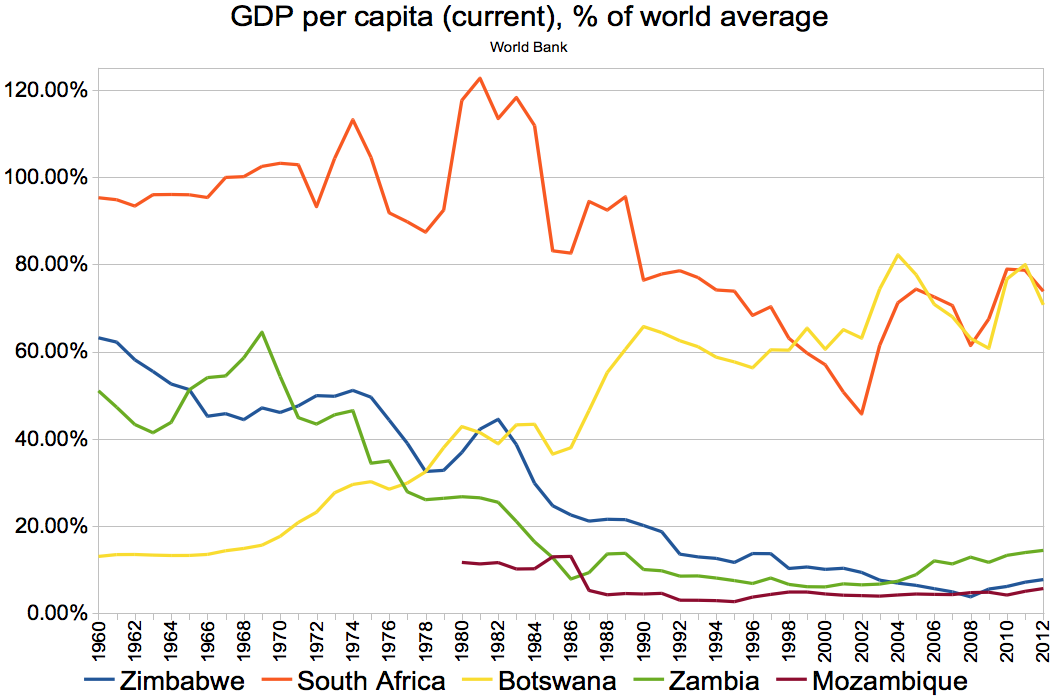
GDP per capita (current) of Zimbabwe (blue ) from 1960 to 2012, compared to neighbouring countries (world average = 100)

=== 1980–2000 ===
At the time of independence, annual inflation was 5.4 percent and month-to-month inflation was 0.5 percent. Currency of Z$2, Z$5, Z$10 and Z$20 denominations were released. Roughly 95 percent of transactions used the Zimbabwean dollar. Following the Lancaster House Agreement in December 1979, the transition to majority rule in early 1980, and the lifting of sanctions, Zimbabwe enjoyed a brisk economic recovery. Real growth for 1980–1981 exceeded 20%. However, depressed foreign demand for the country's mineral exports and the onset of a drought cut sharply into the growth rate in 1982, 1983, and 1984. In 1985, the economy rebounded strongly due to a 30% jump in agricultural production. However, it slumped in 1986 to a zero growth rate and registered a negative of about 3% in 1987, primarily because of drought and the foreign exchange crisis faced by the country. Zimbabwe's GDP grew on average by about 4.5% between 1980 and 1990.

In 1992, a World Bank study indicated that more than 500 health centres had been built since 1980. The percentage of children vaccinated increased from 25% in 1980 to 67% in 1988, and life expectancy increased from 55 to 59 years. Enrolment increased by 232 percent one year after primary education was made free, and secondary school enrolment increased by 33 percent in two years. These social policies lead to an increase in the debt ratio. Several laws were passed in the 1980s in an attempt to reduce wage gaps. However, the gaps remained considerable. In 1988, the law gave women, at least in theory, the same rights as men. Previously, they could only take a few personal initiatives without the consent of their father or husband.

The government started crumbling when a bonus to independence war veterans was announced in 1997 (which was equal to 3 percent of GDP) followed by unexpected spending due to Zimbabwe's involvement in the Second Congo War in 1998. In 1999, the country also witnessed a drought which further weakened the economy, ultimately leading to the country's bankruptcy in the next decade. In the same year, 1999, Zimbabwe experienced its first defaults on its IMF, World Bank, and African Development Bank debts in addition to debts taken out with Western lenders.

=== 2000–2009 ===
In recent years, there has been economic hardship in Zimbabwe. Multiple western countries argue that the Government of Zimbabwe's land reform program, recurrent interference with, and intimidation of the judiciary, as well as maintenance of unrealistic price controls and exchange rates has led to a sharp drop in investor confidence.

Between 2000 and December 2007, the national economy contracted by as much as 40%; inflation vaulted to over 66,000%, and there were persistent shortages of hard currency, fuel, medicine, and food. GDP per capita dropped by 40%, agricultural output dropped by 51% and industrial production dropped by 47%.

The Mugabe Government attribute Zimbabwe's economic difficulties to sanctions imposed by the Western powers. It has been argued that the sanctions imposed by Britain, the US, and the EU have been designed to cripple the economy and the conditions of the Zimbabwean people in an attempt to overthrow President Mugabe's government. These countries on their side argue that the sanctions are targeted against Mugabe and his inner circle and some of the companies they own. Critics point to the so-called "Zimbabwe Democracy and Economic Recovery Act of 2001", signed by Bush, as an effort to undermine Zimbabwe's economy. Soon after the bill was signed, IMF cut off its resources to Zimbabwe. Financial institutions began withdrawing support for Zimbabwe. Terms of the sanctions made it such that all economic assistance would be structured in support of "democratisation, respect for human rights and the rule of law." The EU terminated its support for all projects in Zimbabwe. Because of the sanctions and US and EU foreign policy, none of Zimbabwe's debts have been cancelled as in other countries.

Other observers also point out how the asset freezes by the EU on people or companies associated with Zimbabwe's Government have had significant economic and social costs to Zimbabwe.

As of February 2004, Zimbabwe's foreign debt repayments ceased, resulting in compulsory suspension from the International Monetary Fund (IMF). This, and the United Nations World Food Programme stopping its food aid due to insufficient donations from the world community, has forced the government into borrowing from local sources.

==== Hyperinflation (2004–2009) ====
Official, black market, and OMIR exchange rates Jan 1, 2001 to Feb 2, 2009. Note the logarithmic scale.

Zimbabwe began experiencing severe foreign exchange shortages, exacerbated by the difference between the official rate and the black market rate in 2000. In 2004 a system of auctioning scarce foreign currency for importers was introduced, which temporarily led to a slight reduction in the foreign currency crisis, but by mid-2005 foreign currency shortages were once again severe. The currency was devalued by the central bank twice, first to 9,000 to the US$, and then to 17,500 to the US$ on 20 July 2005, but at that date it was reported that that was only half the rate available on the black market.

In July 2005 Zimbabwe was reported to be appealing to the South African government for US$1 billion of emergency loans, but despite regular rumours that the idea was being discussed no substantial financial support has been publicly reported.

In December 2005 Zimbabwe made a mystery loan repayment of US$120 million to the International Monetary Fund due to expulsion threat from IMF.

The official Zimbabwean dollar exchange rate had been frozen at Z$101,196 per U.S. dollar since early 2006, but as of 27 July 2006 the parallel (black market) rate has reached Z$550,000 per U.S. dollar. By comparison, 10 years earlier, the rate of exchange was only Z$9.13 per USD.

In August 2006 the RBZ revalued the Zimbabwean Dollar by 1000 ZWD to 1 (revalued) dollar. At the same time Zimbabwe devalued the Zim Dollar by 60% against the USD. New official exchange rate revalued ZWD 250 per USD. The parallel market rate was about revalued ZWD 1,200 to 1,500 per USD (28 September 2006).

In November 2006, it was announced that sometime around 1 December there would be a further devaluation and that the official exchange rate would change to revalued ZWD 750 per USD. This never materialized. However, the parallel market immediately reacted to this news with the parallel rate falling to ZWD 2,000 per USD (18 November 2006) and by year end it had fallen to ZWD 3,000 per USD.

On 1 April 2007, the parallel market was asking ZWD 30,000 for US$1. By year end, it was down to about ZWD 2,000,000. On 18 January 2008, the Reserve Bank of Zimbabwe began to issue higher denomination ZWD bearer cheques (a banknote with an expiry date), including $10 million bearer cheques – each of which was worth less than US$1.35 (70p Sterling; 0.90 Euro) on the parallel market at the time of first issue. On 4 April 2008 the Reserve Bank of Zimbabwe introduced new $25 million and $50 million bearer cheques. At the time of first issue they were worth US$0.70 and US$1.40 on the parallel market respectively.

On 1 May 2008, the RBZ announced that the dollar would be allowed to float in value subject to some conditions.

On 6 May 2008, the RBZ issued new $100 million and $250 million bearer cheques. At the date of first issue the $250 million bearer cheque was worth approximately US$1.30 on the parallel market. On 15 May 2008, a new $500 million bearer cheque was issued by the RBZ. At the time of the first issue it was worth US$1.93. In a widely unreported parallel move, on 15 May 2008, the RBZ issued three "special agro-cheques" with face values $5 billion (at time of first issue – $19.30), $25 billion ($96.50) and $50 billion ($193). It is further reported that the new agro-cheques can be used to buy any goods and services like the bearer cheques.

On 30 July 2008, the Governor of the RBZ, Gideon Gono announced that the Zimbabwe dollar would be redenominated by removing 10 zeroes, with effect from 1 August 2008. ZWD10billion became 1 dollar after the redenomination.

More banknotes were issued since Gono vowed to continue printing money: $10,000 and $20,000 (29 September); $50,000 (13 October); $100,000, $500,000 and $1 million (3 November); $10 million (2 December); $50 million and $100 million (4 December); $200 million (9 December); $500 million (11 December); $10 billion (19 December); $1 trillion (17 January 2009).

On February 2, 2009, a final denomination was implemented, cutting 12 zeroes, before the Zimbabwe dollar was officially abandoned on April 12, 2009. Pending economic recovery, Zimbabwe relied on foreign currency rather than introducing a new currency.

=== Dollarization: 2009–present ===
In February 2009, the newly installed national unity government (which included the opposition to Mugabe) allowed foreign currency transactions throughout the economy as a measure to stimulate the economy and end inflation. The Zimbabwean dollar quickly lost all credibility, and by April 2009, the Zimbabwean dollar was suspended entirely, to be replaced by the US dollar in government transactions. In 2014 there were eight legal currencies – US dollar, South African rand, Botswana pula, British pound sterling, Australian dollar, Chinese yuan, Indian rupee and Japanese yen.

Dollarization reversed inflation, permitting the banking system to stabilize and the economy to resume slow growth after 2009. Dollarization also had other consequences, including:

- Reduced taxation and financial transparency, as people continued to keep their money out of the formal banking system.
- Extremely high real interest rates due to lack of capital.
- Government forced into a "pay as you go" system, unable to spend more than it takes in.
- Deficits of coinage for everyday transactions, leading to the adoption of South African rand coins, sweets, airtime for mobile phones or even condoms for small change.
- Counterfeiting currencies with which Zimbabweans are not familiar.
- 10% growth of the economy a year up to 2012

In January 2013 Finance Minister Tendai Biti announced that Zimbabwe's national public account held just $217. The election budget for the July 2013 presidential election was $104 million and government budget for 2013 was $3.09 billion at a projected economic growth of 5 per cent. The Economist described the 2013 election as "rigged" and how, after regaining full control of the government, the Mugabe government doubled the civil service and embarked on "...misrule and dazzling corruption."

In August 2014, Zimbabwe began selling treasury bills and bonds to pay public sector salaries that have been delayed as GDP growth weakens while the economy experiences deflation. US$2 million was sold in July through private placements of Six-month Treasury bills at an interest rate of 9.5%. According to IMF data, GDP growth was forecast to be 3.1% by the end of 2014, a major decline from an average rate of 10% between 2009 and 2012, while government data showed that consumer prices declined for five consecutive months by the end of June. The Reserve Bank continued to issue large values of treasury bills to support the government's over-budget spending. This added to the money supply and in effect devalued all bank balances, despite them being US Dollar denominated.

In November 2016, a pseudo-currency was issued in the form of Bond Notes despite widespread protests against them. In February 2019, John Mangudya, through a monetary policy presentation formally introduced a new currency, the RTGS dollar which consisted of electronic balances in banks and mobile wallets, bond notes and bond coins. This completed the conversion of all US Dollar denominated bank balances to a devalued Zimbabwean currency at a rate of 1:1.

In June 2019, the use of foreign currencies in local transactions was prohibited as part of the prospective plan for a new national currency and thus ended the dollarization period. There was still low volume trade in US Dollars, particularly in the informal sector and using in-shop bureau de change. In March 2020, blaming the challenges of dealing with COVID-19, the government allowed formal transactions in US Dollars once more. Zimbabwe once more extended its multi-currency system from 2025 until 31 December 2030 in October 2023 as a result of declining trust in the Zimbabwean dollar, which also declined by more than 80% in 2023.

=== Government of National Unity: 2009–2013 ===
In response to the negative long-term economic situation the three parliamentary parties agreed on a Government of National Unity. Despite serious internal differences this government made some important decisions that improved the general economic situation, first of all the suspension of the national currency, the Zimbabwean Dollar, in April 2009. That stopped hyperinflation and made normal forms of business possible again, by using foreign currency such as the US American Dollar, the South African Rand, the EUs Euro or the Botswana Pula. The former finance minister Tendai Biti (MDC-T) tried to hold a disciplined budget. In 2009 Zimbabwe recorded a period of economic growth for the first time in a decade.

=== Post-Government of National Unity: 2013–2020 ===
Following ZANU-PF's landslide electoral victory in the 2013 general elections, Patrick Chinamasa was appointed finance minister. Policies encouraging the indigenisation of the economy were fast tracked and laws requiring that 51% or more of non-black Zimbabwean owned companies had to be handed over to black Zimbabweans were implemented. This has been credited with creating further uncertainty in the economy and negatively impacting investment climate in the country. Although legislation dealing with the indigenisation of the Zimbabwean economy has been in development since 2007 and actively initiated by ZANU-PF in 2010 the policy has continued to be accused of being unclear and a form of "racketeering by regulation." The government doubled the civil service and embarked on what the Economist described as "...misrule and dazzling corruption."

In April 2014, Chinamasa admitted that the country was heavily in debt and that the country needed to better attract foreign direct investment. Officially Zimbabwe's debt is $7 billion, or over 200% of the country's GDP. However, this figure is disputed, with figures as high as $11 billion being quoted, once debts to other African countries and China are included. As of May 2014, it has been reported that Zimbabwe's economy was in decline following the period of relative economic stability during the Government of National Unity. It is estimated that Zimbabwe's manufacturing sector requires an investment of roughly US$8 billion for working capital and equipment upgrades.

In 2016 Tendai Biti, an opposition politician estimated the government was running a deficit of up to 12% of GDP and Zimbabwe began experiencing a significant shortage of US dollars partly due to a consistent trade deficit. This prompted the Zimbabwean government to limit cash withdrawals from banks and change exchange-control regulations in order to try to promote exports and reduce the currency shortage. In June and July 2016, after Government employees had not been paid for weeks, police had set up road blocks to coerce money out of tourists and there were protests throughout Zimbabwe, Patrick Chinamasa, the finance minister, toured Europe in an effort to raise investment capital and loans, admitting "Right now we have nothing." In August 2016 the government announced that it would be laying off 25,000 civil servants (8% of the country's 298,000 civil servants), cut the number of embassies and diplomatic expenses and cut ministerial expenses in an attempt to save $4 billion in annual wages and secure help from the World Bank and the IMF.

At the same time, the government sought to improve women's access to microfinance via the Zimbabwe Women Microfinance Bank Limited, which began operations 29 May 2018. The Bank operates under the supervision of the Ministry of Women's Affairs, Gender and Community Development.

==== Re-adoption of the Zimbabwe Dollar ====
In mid-July 2019 inflation had increased to 175% following the adoption of a new Zimbabwe dollar and banning the use of foreign currency thereby sparking fresh concerns that the country was entering a new period of hyperinflation. The Zimbabwean government stopped releasing inflation data in August 2019. The year-on-year inflation rate was 521% in December 2019, but Zimbabwe central bank officials said in February 2020 that they hoped to reduce the figure to 50% by the end of December 2020.

== See also ==
- Zimbabwe national budget
- 1997 Zimbabwean Black Friday
- Science and technology in Zimbabwe
- Economy of Africa
- Economic history of Zimbabwe
- Education in Zimbabwe
- GBDT (digital token)
- History of Zimbabwe
- Zimbabwean dollar
- Tobacco in Zimbabwe
- United Nations Economic Commission for Africa

== Sources ==
This article incorporates text from a free content work. Licensed under CC-BY-SA IGO 3.0. Text taken from UNESCO Science Report: towards 2030, 562–563, UNESCO, UNESCO Publishing.
