= Indigenization =

Form of cultural change

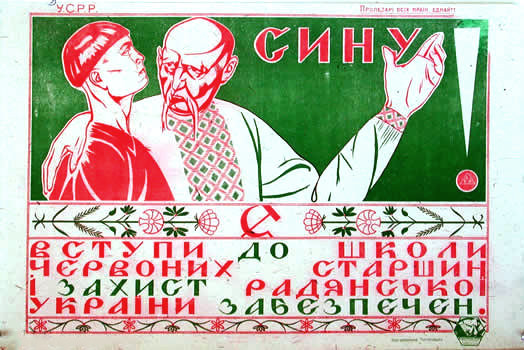
Poster in Ukrainian about the beginning of the indigenization policy (Korenizatsiya in Russian, meaning "indigenization", literally "putting down roots") in Soviet Ukraine (see: Ukrainization). The text translates to: "Son! Enroll in the School of Red Commanders, and the defense of Soviet Ukraine will be ensured." First published in the USSR in 1921.

Indigenization is the act of making something more indigenous; transformation of some service, idea, etc. to suit a local culture, especially through the use of more indigenous people in public administration, employment and other fields.

The term is primarily used by anthropologists to describe what happens when locals take something from the outside and make it their own (such as: Africanization or Americanization).

== History ==
=== History of the word ===
The first use of the word indigenization recorded by the OED is in a 1951 paper about studies conducted in India about Christian missionaries. The word was used to describe the process of making churches indigenous in southern India. It was used in The Economist in 1962 to describe managerial positions and in the 1971 book English Language in West Africa by John Spencer, where it was used to describe the adoption of English. Indigenization is often used to describe the adoption of colonial culture in Africa because of the effects of colonialism by Europe in the 19th and the early 20th centuries.

== Types ==
=== Linguistics ===
In this context, indigenization is used to refer to how a language is adopted in a certain area such as French in Africa. The term is used to describe the process where a language needed to be indigenized was in Africa where the ex-colonizer's language required some references to African religion and culture, even though in the original language there was no vocabulary for this. As this process is being carried out, there is usually a metalanguage created that is some combination of the original language and the introduced language. This language shares cultural aspects from both cultures, making it distinct and usually done in order to understand the foreign language in the context of the local region. Sometimes the term indigenization is preferred over other terms such as Africanization because it carries no negative connotations and does not imply any underlying meaning.

=== Economy ===
Indigenization is seen as the process of changing someone to a person of more corroboration towards their surroundings. A large part of that process is the economy of said surroundings. Indigenization has played an important part in the economic roles of society. Thanks to the Indigenization and Economic Empowerment Act, black people were offered a more distinguished position in the economy, with foreigners having to give up 51% of their business to black people. China's Open Door Policy is seen as a big step of indigenization for their economy, as it is opening its doors to the western world. This allowed different cultures to experience one another and opened up China's businesses to the western world as well, which set China forth in a sort of economic reform.

=== Social work ===
Another big part of indigenization is social work, although it is unknown what the actual process is when social forces come into place. Indigenization is seen by some as less of a process of naturalization and more of a process of culturally relevant social work. Indigenization was not the standard, but it was a way to accustom others to a surrounding point of view but also to help understand where the people came from and their heritage. However, some argue that the indigenization of social work may work when it comes to foreigners being brought into Western cultures, it would not work as well in non-Western cultures. They also argue that Western cultures seem to exaggerate the similarities and the differences between Western and foreign cultures.

=== Indigenization and the Economic Empowerment Act ===
The Indigenization and Economic Empowerment Act was passed by Zimbabwe Parliament in 2008. It is a set of regulations meant to regulate businesses, compelling foreign-owned firms to sell 51-percent of their business to native Zimbabweans over the following years. Five-year jail terms are assigned to foreigners who do not submit an indigenisation plan or use natives as fronts for their businesses. The intent of the law is to ensure the country's indigenous members fulfill a more prominent role in the economy. Controversy rose over this intent, with opponents stating that the law will scare away foreign investors. Indigenous Zimbabweans are defined as "any person who, before the 18th April, 1980 [when Zimbabwe gained independence from Britain], was disadvantaged by unfair discrimination on the grounds of his or her race, and any descendant of such person, and includes any company, association, syndicate or partnership of which indigenous Zimbabweans form the majority of the members or hold the controlling interest".

This provision allows the minister of youth development, indigenization and economic empowerment, Saviour Kasukuwere, to keep a database of indigenous businesses from which foreign interest can pick partners. At the time of the law passing, the ruling party in Zimbabwe was Zanu-PF, led by the president Robert Mugabe. Saviour Kasukuwere is a member of this party, which brought up skepticism among economists who speculated that the database may be used by the party to give its allies the best deals. Mr. Kasukuwere stated that he will implement the law regardless of objections.

=== Place names ===
Federal government organizations like the Geographical Names Board of Canada may change already existing place names with feedback and action from provincial and local authorities as well as accepting submissions for change from the public via accessible forms. Indigenous names may become revived as a result, notable examples include Sanirajak, Kinngait, qathet, Haida Gwaii, and the Salish Sea.

== See also ==
- Angolanidade
- Cultural homogenization
- Ethnic nationalism
- Indigenism
  - Indigenismo
- Korenizatsiya
- Language localisation
- Nation-building
- Westernization
