= CHC =

CHC may refer to:

== Health care ==
- Centro Hospitalar de Coimbra (C.H.C.), a hospital complex in Coimbra, Portugal
- Columbia Health Care
- Community health center
- Community Health Clubs in Africa
- Community health council
- Continuing healthcare

== Education ==
- Calvert Hall College, a Catholic preparatory high school in Maryland, USA
- Chavakachcheri Hindu College, a famous school in the Thenmarachchi region, Jaffna
- Chestnut Hill College - a Catholic college in Philadelphia, PA
- College of the Holy Cross, a college in Worcester, Massachusetts
- Cornwall Hill College, a college in Pretoria, South Africa
- Robert D. Clark Honors College at the University of Oregon in Eugene, Oregon

== Politics ==
- Cooler Heads Coalition, an organisation of self-described scientists who reject the scientific consensus on climate change
- Congressional Hispanic Caucus, in the Congress of the United States
- Croatian Helsinki Committee, a human rights group

== Sports ==
- Colonial Hockey Conference, an NCAA D-III women's hockey conference
- Castrol-Haugg-Cup, a race-like event contested mainly at Nürburgring
- Club de Hockey Canadien, the official French name of the Montreal Canadiens NHL club
- Chicago Cubs, a Major League Baseball team that uses this abbreviation for box scores and television scoring displays

== Transport ==
- Charing Cross (Glasgow) railway station's National Rail station code
- Ching Chung stop's MTR station code
- Christchurch Airport's IATA airport code
- CHC Helicopter, the world's largest global commercial helicopter operator

== Other ==
- Canadian Hurricane Centre
- CHC Theory, Cattell-Horn-Carroll theory of human cognitive abilities
- Chlorinated hydrocarbon (individual substance) and chlorinated hydrocarbons (group of substances)
- City Harvest Church, a local independent megachurch in Singapore
- Conventual Chaplain ad honorem of the Sovereign Military Order of Malta
