= 2008 Zimbabwean cholera outbreak =

Disease outbreak in Zimbabwe

- The spread of cholera in Zimbabwe as of 5 February 2009, using data from several sources.
- Date: August 2008 – July 2009
- Location: Zimbabwe
- Cause: Vibrio cholerae
- Deaths: 4,369
- Injuries: 98,569

The 2008 Zimbabwean cholera outbreak was an epidemic of cholera affecting much of Zimbabwe from August 2008 until June 2009. The outbreak began in Chitungwiza in Harare Metropolitan Province in August 2008, then spread throughout the country so that by December 2008, cases were being reported in all 10 provinces. In December 2008, The Zimbabwean government declared the outbreak a national emergency and requested international aid. The outbreak peaked in January 2009 with 8,500 cases reported per week. Cholera cases from this outbreak were also reported in neighboring countries South Africa, Malawi, Botswana, Mozambique, and Zambia. With the help of international agencies, the outbreak was controlled, and by July 2009, after no cases had been reported for several weeks, the Zimbabwe Ministry of Health and Child Welfare declared the outbreak over. In total, 98,596 cases of cholera and 4,369 deaths were reported, making this the largest outbreak of cholera ever recorded in Zimbabwe. The large scale and severity of the outbreak has been attributed to poor sanitation, limited access to healthcare, and insufficient healthcare infrastructure throughout Zimbabwe.

== Cause ==
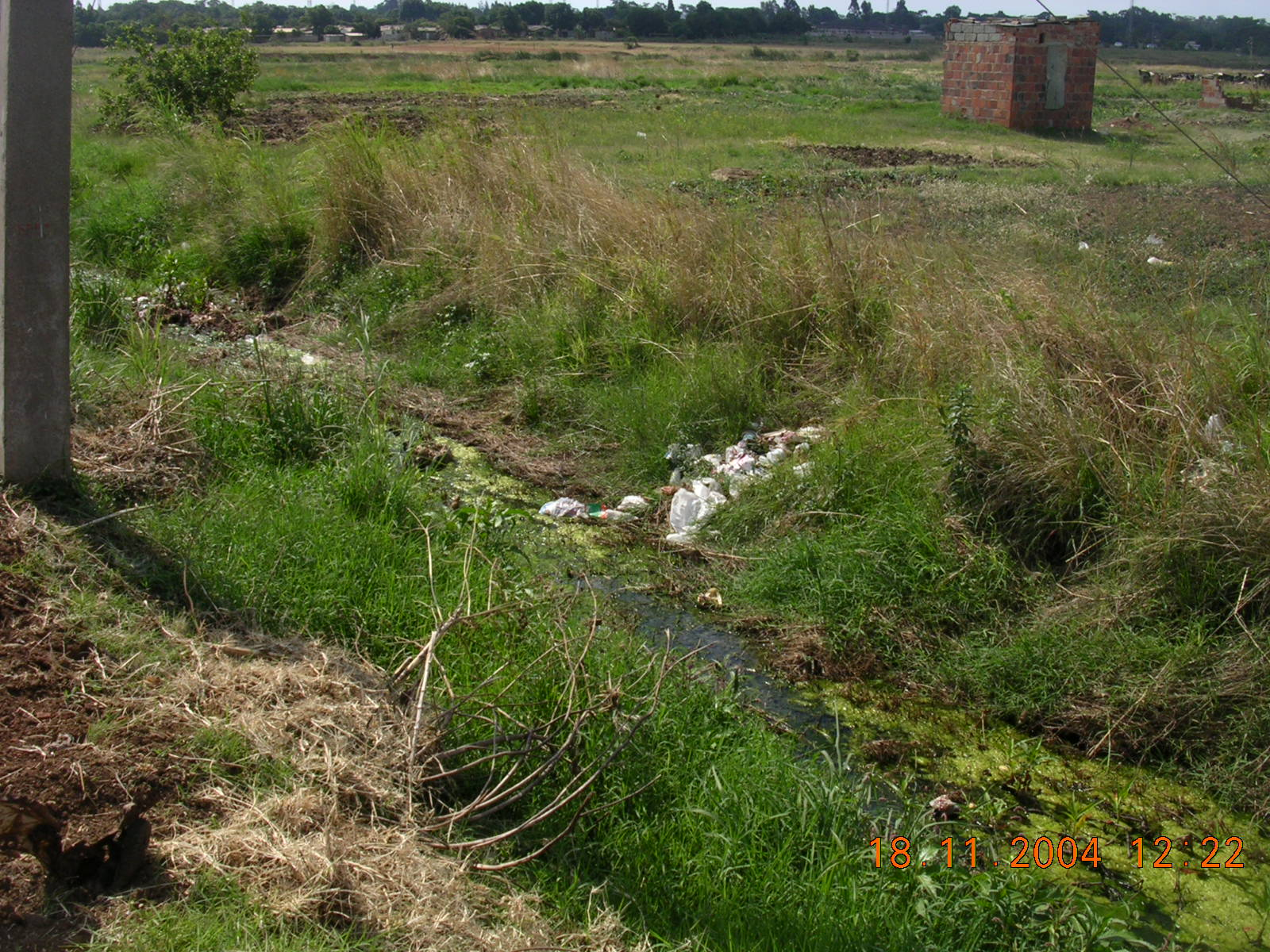
An open drain in Kuwadzana township, Harare in 2004. By 2008 drains such as this were carrying sewage from burst sewage pipes and feces washed out of the neighbouring areas as the urban sanitation system collapsed. This contributed to the rapid spread of the cholera outbreak.

The 2008 cholera outbreak was caused by widespread infection with the bacterium Vibrio cholerae which is spread through water contaminated with the feces of infected individuals. Cholera had been seen in Zimbabwe in the decade leading up to the 2008 outbreak. However, the severity of the 2008 has been attributed to a combination of societal factors including poor access to health care and poor health care infrastructure, high HIV prevalence, political instability, food shortages, high levels of displaced people, and lack of access to safe water. In 2008, Zimbabwe was suffering from an economic crisis and hyperinflation which led to shortages of food and other basic goods, disruption of public services, and a large number of refugees moving within the country and to neighboring countries.

One of the major contributing factors to the outbreak was the breakdown of the municipal water supply, sanitation, and waste collection programs throughout the country, but especially in urban areas. With this, the onset of the rainy season led to cholera-contaminated faeces being washed into water sources, in particular public drains, as well as providing readily available but contaminated water. Due to a shortage of purification chemicals, such as chlorine, the capital city of Harare stopped receiving piped water on 1 December 2008. By that date, many suburbs had not had any water supply for much longer. On 4 December 2008, the Zimbabwe deputy minister for water and infrastructural development stated that there were only sufficient treatment chemicals in stock nationally for 12 weeks supply. The collapse of these systems was blamed on the then-current economic crisis; many households cannot afford fuel to boil water. According to Médecins Sans Frontières, the spread of cholera from urban to rural areas from December 2008 onwards was due to infected city-dwellers visiting their families' rural homes for Christmas and the burial of infected city-dwellers in rural areas.

The 2008 cholera epidemic in Zimbabwe had an unusually high fatality rate; Oxfam attributed the high mortality to a population "seriously weakened by hunger, HIV and AIDS". A major contributing factor to the severity of the outbreak was the collapse of Zimbabwe's public health system, declared a national emergency on 4 December 2008. By the end of November 2008, three of Zimbabwe's four major hospitals had shut down, along with the Zimbabwe Medical School, and the fourth major hospital had two wards and no operating theatres working. Zimbabwean hospitals still open by December 2008 lacked medicines and staff. Due to hyperinflation, hospitals were not able to buy basic drugs and medicines, and the resources of even internationally funded emergency clinics were stretched. The ongoing political and economic crisis contributed to the emigration of doctors and people with medical knowledge. Some victims were travelling to Botswana and other neighbouring countries for treatment.

== Impact ==
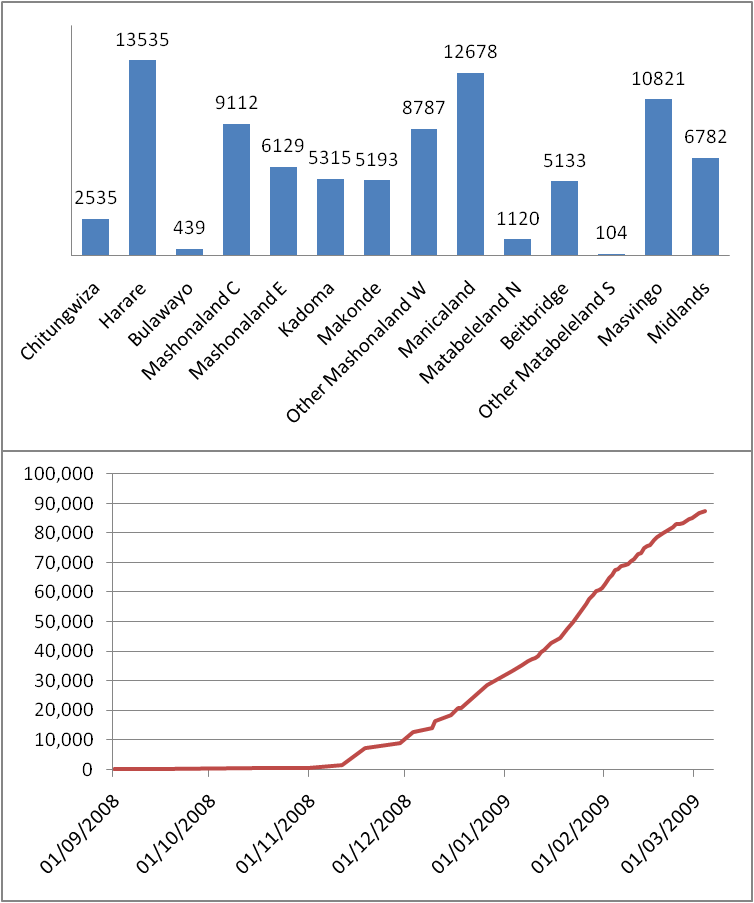
The spread of cholera in Zimbabwe: (top) The number of cases recorded in the most infected centres and districts, and in the remainder of each province of Zimbabwe as of 4 March 2009. (bottom) Total number of reported cases. Since totals for many districts are not updated daily, the first occurrence of a case may represent the date of the reporting of that case, not the date of infection. Data sources: United Nations Office for the Coordination of Humanitarian Affairs, the World Health Organization, the International Federation of Red Cross and Red Crescent Societies. and news media,

The 2008 outbreak began in Chitungwiza on 20 August 2008. In September, cases spread to the urban areas of Makonde and Chinhoyi. By the end of October, cases had spread to 3 provinces: Mashonaland West, Mashonaland East, and Harare city. In the first two weeks of November, the epidemic rapidly spread across Zimbabwe, appearing in a total of 9 provinces and 54 districts. The disease spread to reach all of Zimbabwe's ten provinces. The attack rate was highest in Beitbridge, Chegutu, Mudzi and Zvimba Districts (above 1,000 cases per 100,000 people or 1.0%).

The number of cases reported by the United Nations Office for the Coordination of Humanitarian Affairs escalated from 30 on 1 September 2008 to 15,572 by 10 December. According to the Red Cross, around 46% of reported deaths occur en route to clinics and hospitals. The head of the British Department for International Development in Harare said that "there are probably twice as many people with cholera as turn up for treatment".

The case fatality rate for the outbreak was higher than expected for such outbreaks, although it began declining by January 2009. Official estimates of fatalities have run from 484 to 800, since the outbreak in August 2008, with an upper estimate of 3,000 from an anonymous senior official in the Ministry of Health and Child Welfare. Fatality rates varied from 2.5% in Harare to 18% in Chitungwiza. In Harare, the crisis reached the extent that the city council offered free graves to cholera victims. By 7 December, Oxfam estimated 60,000 cases by the end of January 2009 and a 10% fatality rate, with UNICEF giving a similar estimate. On 4 December 2008, the Zimbabwe government declared the outbreak to be a national emergency.

== Response ==
Assistance after the 2008 outbreak was made available by numerous international agencies, and funding for water, sanitation and hygiene programmes, epidemic response and the provision of essential drugs came from several governments and trans-governmental organisations:

Government or Agency	Amount	Date
Government of Australia	A$8,000,000 for food and emergency aid	2 December 2008
Government of Botswana	US$300,000	3 December 2008
Government of France	€200,000 for water purification tablets and distribution points Water treatment equipment	4 December 2008; 11 December 2008
Government of Germany	€1,000,000 to the Red Cross	8 December 2008
Government of Namibia	US$165,000 of medical supplies	7 December 2008.
Government of the Netherlands	€5,000,000 for medication, drinking water and water purification tablets	December 2008.
Government of South Africa	Emergency food and medicine	4 December 2008
Government of Switzerland	US$820,000 to an emergency aid programme and logistical support for UN agencies	9 December 2008
Government of the United Kingdom	£3,000,000	November 2008
USAID	US$6,200,000 for health, water and sanitation programmes	11 December 2008
Government of Venezuela	Over 74 tons of medical supplies and drinking water	3 January 2009
African Union	US$100,000	11 December 2008
European Commission	€9,000,000	3 December 2008
World Health Organization	US$340,000 of medication and supplies	4 December 2008
Giving Children Hope and World Vision	US$500,000 of medication	2 December 2008
International Committee of the Red Cross	over 13 tons of medical supplies	4 December 2008
World Vision and Health Partners International of Canada	US$4,000,000 of medication	13 January 2009

By 7 December 2008, UNICEF had secured international donor funding to provide sufficient water treatment chemicals for three weeks water supply for Harare and had arranged a shipment of chemical sufficient for four months supply. UNICEF distributed 360,000 litres of water per day in Harare, as well as handing out soap and buckets. Notwithstanding the contributions received, UNICEF indicated on 9 December 2008 that US$17,500,000 was needed to respond properly to the outbreak. As of 15 December, following agreement with the Zimbabwe government, the World Health Organization was procuring medical supplies to roll out a response plan to run health centres.

== Spread ==
Spread of cholera within southern Africa, as of 10 February 2009. Not all cases are part of the 2008–2009 Zimbabwean cholera outbreak. Key: █ Deaths recorded █ Infections recorded

The 2008 cholera outbreak spread to districts in Botswana, Mozambique, South Africa and Zambia bordering Zimbabwe.

=== South Africa ===
Cholera spread to the Zimbabwean migrant worker community in Limpopo and Mpumalanga provinces of South Africa and cholera bacteria were detected in the Limpopo River on 3 December 2008. By 12 December 2008, 11 deaths and 859 infections had been recorded in South Africa, rising to 2,100 cases and 15 deaths by 14 January 2009, and to 12,000 cases and 59 deaths by 10 March.

The South African government set up medical facilities and drinking water supplies at the Beitbridge border post and deployed the National Outbreak Response Team and additional medical personnel to Musina. Anthony Turton, a political scientist and Unit Fellow with the Council for Scientific and Industrial Research (CSIR) in South Africa, who had earlier warned of the risk of cholera in South Africa and wrote a report that recommended that the South African government increase its spending on water treatments lest a cholera outbreak occur in the country, was suspended for having made "inappropriate statements to the media". On 10 December 2008, the Limpopo Provincial Government declared Vhembe District Municipality, which borders Zimbabwe at Beitbridge, Matabeleland South province, a disaster area. On a 28 January 2009 visit to Musina with high-ranking government and ruling party officials, Health Minister Barbara Hogan said

Cholera is spreading... We are beginning to see a shift from Zimbabwe to South Africa. The situation is scary... I am concerned about the impact this is having on our provinces.

=== Other countries ===
The spread of cholera to Zimbabwe's other neighbouring countries was initially slower than in South Africa, with one death recorded in Kafue District in Zambia and none in Botswana or Namibia by 9 December 2008. In 2009, cases increased, with 4,354 cases and 55 deaths reported by 10 February 2009 in Zambia and 1,596 cases and 14 deaths in Katanga, the southernmost province of the DR Congo. In Mozambique, cholera spread to 10 out of 11 provinces, with a total of 9,533 cases by 1 Jan to 1 Mar 2009 and 119 deaths by 17 March. Four health workers also died in a mob attack, blamed on "misinformation and misunderstanding in efforts to combat cholera", and 12 of the prisoners from the incident died in jail. In Malawi 104 deaths were recorded since January, making it the worst outbreak since 2001–02 where 960 people died. Kenya, Somalia, Tanzania, DRC, and Ghana have had unrelated cholera outbreaks with between 10 and 100 deaths in 2009 as of February.

== Prevention ==
After the 2008 epidemic was declared a national emergency, the Ministry of Health and Child Welfare (MOHCW) collaborated with several other departments, governments, and non-governmental organizations to create a Cholera Command and Control Centre. This centre works to prevent cholera outbreaks in Zimbabwe by addressing broader societal factors that could contribute to cholera outbreaks, such as water sanitation and poor hygiene habits.

== Politicisation ==
Because of its well-organised health care system and effective water sanitation facilities, Rita R. Colwell of the James Baker Institute says Zimbabwe was historically one of the African countries least affected by cholera. A news commentary in The Lancet said that, under President Robert Mugabe, the country's health programs were negatively impacted, resulting in diminished health care for those infected with cholera. According to a draft paper from the WHO's World Conference on Social Determinants in Health, there were fewer health workers in the villages than in urban areas, which hindered early detection and isolation of cholera cases.

A news commentator writing for The Lancet, Andrew Meldrum, said that President Mugabe's Youth Militia threatened health professionals that provided medical treatment to political opponents. He said that, combined with decreasing education standards, low pay, and a shortage of medical supplies like latex gloves, this led doctors to leave Zimbabwe at an alarming rate. According to Douglas Gwatidzo, the chairman of the Zimbabwe Doctors for Human Rights group, Zimbabwe had only one doctor assigned to a group of 12,000 citizens. Doctors in Zimbabwe fill only 25% of the medical posts available, and even fewer specialist positions are taken. According to Meldrum, this poses serious challenges to health care for diseases like HIV/AIDS and cholera. Similarly, the effects of cholera are exacerbated without proper nutrition, and Zimbabwe has faced food shortages for the last several years.

Cholera and malnutrition keep children out of school – a serious social consequence of the outbreak. Rachel Pound, the director of Save the Children in Zimbabwe, said that attending school may be dangerous in Zimbabwe, instead of providing a ladder for self-improvement. She noted that "Sanitation is now so bad in schools that they may become a breeding ground for infection", rather than a place of valuable education.

According to Meldrum, Zimbabwe's high inflation left the country with a lack of financial resources, resulting in a shortage of ambulances and pharmaceutical drugs. According to Eric Pruyt of the Delft University of Technology in The Netherlands, this was exacerbated by a shortage of international aid, as Zimbabwe's government didn't acknowledge the epidemic and accept aid until the disease was widespread. It was not contained or prevented from spreading. Until 2008, the government insisted that there was no cholera in Zimbabwe, and Pruyt says the U.N. did not provide the country with safe drinking water until after the crisis started. Meldrum says that, during Zimbabwe's continuing HIV/AIDS dilemma, some major international donors did not give much money because they believed it would help President Mugabe stay in power, which they did not want.

As the outbreak and health crisis grew worse, American and British leaders cited the crisis as further proof that it was, in their view, "well past time for (President) Robert Mugabe to leave" and that Zimbabwe had become a failed state. Marian Tupy of the Cato Institute said that the crisis began in 2005 when the government took over water treatment facilities but without sufficient funding to maintain purification processes. The transfer of water treatment from local government to the Zimbabwe National Water Authority was criticized by Innocent Nhapi of the National University of Rwanda on the basis of capacity and funding of the authority. The lack of funding for water treatment chemicals, maintenance and staff salaries was cited by Colwell of the Baker Institute as a major cause of the epidemic. According to Colwell, before funds were diverted from the plants to other uses, there were only sixty-five cases and four deaths from cholera in Zimbabwe.

According to an editorial by Daniel J Ncayiyana in the South African Medical Journal, President Mugabe blamed the U.S. and the U.K. for the cholera outbreak, saying that they sent the disease so that they have a reason to credibly remove him from the presidency. One Zimbabwean citizen was shown with a sign that blamed UK Prime Minister Gordan Brown for the disease; the sign expressed the horrors of "Brown's cholera".

According to a news report in Al Jazeera, the Zimbabwe government and state media blamed the outbreak on European and American sanctions and a Reuters report said it accused Britain of plotting an invasion under the cover of the outbreak. Information minister Sikhanyiso Ndlovu blamed the cholera deaths on Western sanctions, saying "the cholera issue has been used to drive a wedge among us". On 12 December, Ndlovu repeated his accusation, and claimed that the cholera outbreak was actually a "serious biological-chemical weapon" attack by the United Kingdom, which Ndlovu asserted was trying to commit genocide. Said Ndlovu:

Cholera is a calculated, racist, terrorist attack on Zimbabwe by the unrepentant former colonial power, which has enlisted support from its American and Western allies so that they can invade the country.

In the meantime, a senior ZANU-PF official argued that the government and party leadership was more focussed on the forthcoming ZANU-PF conference than on the current crisis. On 11 December 2008, President Robert Mugabe made a speech screened on national television in which he said:

I am happy to say our doctors have been assisted by others and WHO (the World Health Organization)... so now that there is no cholera... Because of cholera, Mr Brown wants a military intervention... Bush wants military intervention because of cholera... There is no cause for war any more. The cholera cause doesn't exist any more.

Reports from the WHO contradicted Mugabe's view and indicated a growing death toll. According to the WHO, as of 8 December nearly 800 people had died of cholera and more than 16,000 cases were being treated. Later that same day, Zimbabwean visas were denied to six French aid workers, including three crisis management specialists, two epidemiologists and a water treatment expert. Britain's Africa minister, Mark Malloch-Brown, dismissed Mugabe's claim that the Zimbabwe cholera crisis is over, commenting as follows:

I don't know what world he [Mugabe] is living in. There is a raging humanitarian crisis in Zimbabwe as well as an economic crisis and still there is no representative government able to lead the country out of this disaster.

The French foreign ministry and USAID also contradicted Mugabe's statements and called on him to allow aid to reach the people in need.

== See also ==
- Health in Zimbabwe
- Water supply and sanitation in Zimbabwe
- Cholera outbreaks and pandemics
- 2018–2019 Zimbabwe cholera outbreak
