= MZI =

MZI may refer to:

== People ==
- Mzi Khumalo, South African businessman
- Mzi Mahola, South African writer

== Other uses ==
- Mach–Zehnder interferometer
- Mazda MZI, a version of the Ford Mondeo V6 automobile engine
- MZI, IATA code for Mopti Airport, Mali
- mzi, ISO 639-3 language code for Ixcatlán Mazatec, one of the Mazatecan languages
