= Africa AHEAD =

Non-governmental organization

Africa AHEAD is a non-governmental organization working primarily in sub-Saharan Africa. AHEAD stands for Applied Health, Education, And Development.

== History ==
Africa AHEAD was founded in Zimbabwe in 1995 by Juliet and Anthony Waterkeyn (then known as Zimbabwe AHEAD), and was registered as a UK Charity in 2013 with a Board of well-known UK academics chaired by Prof Sandy Cairncross (OBE)(2013-2016) followed by Prof. Richard Carter (2016-2019). Africa AHEAD dissolved its UK registered charity and resolved to move back to Harare, Zimbabwe, led by local Board of Trustees, chaired by Dr. Juliet Waterkeyn, with Regis Matimati as Executive Director of the organisation.

Africa AHEAD Zimbabwe is the implementing organisation, having grown out of Zimbabwe AHEAD Trust founded by the Waterkeyns in 1999, remaining one of the most innovative NGOs in Zimbabwe, having started over 3,000 CHCs directly reaching over 2 million people in Zimbabwe alone by 2020. The team has developed the training materials and method for participatory health education based on PHAST principles, to prevent many common diseases which cause 80% of infant deaths - such as diarrhoea, cholera, pneumonia, malaria and malnutrition; as well as many debilitating diseases which affect growth and development such as bilharzia, intestinal helminths (worms), skin and eye diseases.

Africa AHEAD Association was started to scale up the work of the Waterkeyn's in many countries in Africa, who since 1994 have been developing and refining a model of community development, known as the 'Applied Health Education and Development' (AHEAD) Approach - a 4 phase process of holistic and integrated development. This is a method of community mobilisation which starts up a grass roots group in each village known as a Community Health Club. The Waterkeyns then revamped Africa AHEAD Association based out of Cape Town which is an active group of experienced CHC practitioners involved in the research and training for the dissemination of the Community Health Club Approach.

== Approach ==
The reduction of disease is achieved through shared understanding and common action to prevent these diseases through good hygiene facilities and non-risk hygiene behaviour. Consensus for common action is achieved by regular community level meetings, facilitated by a local village health worker, who helps to focus the community's attention on issues of health and hygiene. Over time, the 'common unity' is built, and this functional community then begin to focus on the many ways they can improve their health typically through construction and use of hygienic latrine, hand washing facilities, as well as ensuring a safe environment for children.

The 1st stage of the process is a six-month period of weekly dialogue sessions on health issues which affect them and ways to control disease through preventative means. The 2nd stage is to put this knowledge into practice through the construction of local sanitary facilities, and the improvement of kitchen hygiene as well as personal hygiene. In the 3rd year the Community Health Clubs tend to morph into a Food Agriculture and nutrition Club (FAN) which start up nutrition gardens or other farming activities to generate income, and in so doing empower women in particular to be self-sufficient financially. This leads to increased self-confidence and sustainable livelihoods as women run income-generation businesses enable the community to improve its health and hygiene situation, as well as supporting other vulnerable families in the neighbourhood. The 4th and possibly final stage of development is when the village is largely self-sustaining and can competently ensure the survival, growth and proper development of all children, controlling all preventable diseases. At this point people can afford to be more altruistic and reach out to marginalised and vulnerable families within their community such as widows, orphans, child headed families, and those who are infirm, aged, mentally unstable or have terminal diseases. This is also a time of building civic responsibility, becoming politically aware and a full participant in society, ensuring the rights of all are adequately protected.

The AHEAD Model is in effect a 'Rights based approach', putting women at the centre of development in a model of community development which uses health promotion as an entrypoint to sustainable development, providing a practical model which can be used by NGOs and government to meet the Sustainable Development Goals at under US$5 per person.

To date the AHEAD Approach has only been scaled up nationwide in Rwanda in the Community Based Environmental Health Promotion Programme (CBEHPP) which has reached every one of the 14,767 villages in Rwanda, being instrumental in enabling sanitation coverage to increase to 98% in Rwanda by 2015. The CBEHP Programme was first started in 2010, introduced by Anthony Waterkeyn, working with WSP/World Bank for Ministry of Health. The concept was immediately understood as a means of community building and was endorsed directly by President Kagame himself. By 2015 core trainers, originally trained by Juliet Waterkeyn had succeeded in rolling out the CHC training to 40% of the villages in Rwanda, assisted by 14 implementing partners, such as Water Aid, World Vision, Swiss Aid, SNV and others. In 2016 USAID supported the massive scale up to cover 8 districts which included not only Water and Sanitation but also a nutrition component. Africa AHEAD supported Rusizi District funded by the Gates Foundation in an evaluation of the CHC Approach.

In 2014 President Kagame advocated the use of CBEHPP in the Kigali Action Plan which focuses on relieving poverty in 10 of the poorest Countries in Africa. Rwanda was one of only four countries in Africa to not only achieve, but surpass, the Millennium Development Goal of halving the number within the country without access to safe water and sanitation.

Africa AHEAD has been the key mover behind the introduction of Community Health Clubs into other countries through other NGOs: Sierra Leone (CARE International, 2002), Uganda (Care International, 2003), South Africa (Government, 2005; IWRM, Danida 2010), Guinea Bissau (Effective Interventions, 2008), Vietnam (Government/Danida, 2010), Rwanda (Government/UNICEF/WSP, 2010), Namibia (ISOE, 2013) DR Congo (Tear Fund, 2015). It is estimated that by 2015, over 3000 CHCs with over 250,000 members, and 1,542,000 beneficiaries with improved living standards could be attributed to consultancies for these NGOs by Juliet and Anthony Waterkeyn and their teams. This work has been supported by organizations such as the U.K. Department for International Development and Danish International Development Agency.

On the basis of this interest, they founded Africa AHEAD in 2103 which has systemised the CHC Approach, with a view to replication and scaling up throughout Africa. There are two currently main hubs based in Kigali (Rwanda) and Harare (Zimbabwe) with expert teams of trainers. They offer training for any NGOs or government wishing to embrace the AHEAD approach. They also offer a data base of CHCs on which provides monitoring and evaluation tools for any programmes using the 'Classic CHC' approach.

The CHC concept differs from traditional aid approaches that are heavily input-based and has led to a number of articles in development journals.

== See also ==
- Health in Zimbabwe
