= 1997 Zimbabwean Black Friday =

1997 Black Friday of Zimbabwe

1997 Zimbabwean Black Friday is an economic event that led to the turmoil of Zimbabwean economy as a result of former president, Mugabe's measure. The term ‘Black Friday’ was driven from a national electricity blackout that happened the same day. On 14 November 1997, Robert Mugabe gave order to Finance Minister to release Z$4.2 billion into the economy as a once off payment to over 50,000 war veterans. The Zimbabwean dollar crashed the same day by 71.5% against United States Dollar while Zimbabwe Stock Market lost 46% of its previous day market capitalization. Private Companies lost Z$4 billion in market value, the likes of Delta Corporation.

== Background ==
The situation was propelled by war veterans, as they pushed to be paid their war packages.

== Events ==
Zimbabwe's introduction of unbudgeted Z$4.2 billion, which represented 3% of the GDP, led to the plummeting of local currency by 71.5% and stock market by 46%. The central bank intervened into the market with an $15 million worth of reserves to restore order. The central bank placed several measures including forcing corporates to liquidate their foreign currency holdings, banks and bureau de change were no longer allowed to hold $5 million and $500,000 in foreign currency respectively. Companies lost Z$4 billion in form foreign exchange losses and stock market losses.

== Aftermath ==
Zim dollar crashed by nearly 72% in four hours. ZSE shed 46% of its value.

== See also ==
- Economy of Zimbabwe
- Robert Mugabe
- Zimbabwe national budget
