= Health in Zimbabwe =

Zimbabwe was once a model functional healthcare system in post colonial Africa, boasting a strong primary healthcare system and skilled healthcare workers under the controversial colonial administration. However, since the 1990s, its quality has decreased. In 2008, Zimbabwe had a 76.9 billion percent inflation rate and this worsened the state of the healthcare system which has not recovered today and is relying mostly on donor funding to keep running.

== Health status ==
The top three health threats facing Zimbabweans are HIV, TB and malaria, all of which are highly preventable. These diseases contribute effectively to maternal and childhood death, with a maternal mortality rate of 365 per 100,000 according to the latest census report. Declining economic conditions have led to the fall of one of Africa's most robust healthcare systems with underpaid skilled doctors fleeing to other countries and hospitals being under equipped even with the basic PPE. In 2019, more than 40% of the total number of deaths were attributed to HIV, lower respiratory infection, TB and malaria.

=== Life expectancy ===
Life expectancy in Zimbabwe

According to Our World in Data, Zimbabwe's life expectancy at birth is estimated to be 62.8 years as of 2023, with 60 years for males and 65 years for females.

=== Malaria ===
Malaria is a major health problem in Zimbabwe with about half the population at risk. Malaria epidemiology varies across the country ranging from year-round transmission in lowland areas to epidemic-prone areas in highland areas. Transmission is seasonal, occurring primarily between November and April, correlating closely with rainfall. According to Zimbabwe's District Health Information System-2, approximately 82 percent of malaria cases in 2016 originated from three eastern provinces (Manicaland, Mashonaland East, and Mashonaland Central), with 39 percent of all cases and 31 percent of all deaths coming from Manicaland. The concentrated trend of malaria cases and deaths in three provinces has remained consistent since 2013.

Reported cases decreased from 1.8 million in 2006 to 281,000 in 2016 (20.5 per 1,000 population per year). New cases mostly occur along the Zimbabwe-Mozambique border, including Manicaland, where Anopheles funestus (mosquito vector) resistance to pyrethroid class insecticides was identified in 2013. It is difficult to quantify if the case burden in this area is also due to migration across the border, strengthened surveillance systems, or ineffective malaria control interventions.

=== Cholera ===
Spread of cholera within southern Africa, as of 10 February 2009. Not all cases are part of the 2008–2009 Zimbabwean cholera outbreak. Key: █ Deaths recorded █ Infections recorded

A 2008 cholera epidemic in Zimbabwe began in August 2008, swept across the country and spread to Botswana, Mozambique, South Africa and Zambia. By 10 January 2010 there had been 98,741 reported cases and 4,293 deaths making it the deadliest African cholera outbreak since 1993. The Government of Zimbabwe declared the outbreak a national emergency and requested international aid.

There was also a 2018-2019 cholera outbreak with a total of 10,421 cases, including 69 deaths.

Following Cyclones Idai and Kenneth, 490,000 people were vaccinated in Chimanimani and Chipinge districts in Manicaland Province with the goal of preempting a possible cholera outbreak. There were no cholera cases following the cyclones in Zimbabwe, but there were cases in neighboring Mozambique.

=== HIV/AIDS ===
Zimbabwe was and still is one of the countries that have been strongly affected by HIV/AIDS. HIV is the leading cause of death in Zimbabwe with a minimum of 19.4% of deaths in 2019. Several donors have invested in managing HIV infections in Zimbabwe and it is running a 502 million grant from the sixth cycle of the Global Fund. The immensity of this health issue can be clearly determined through this particular statistic: one in every five children was orphaned due to the HIV/AIDS crisis, which adds up to a total of approximately 1 million orphanhoods caused by AIDS in 2011 alone. In 2021, 6,800 young people (ages 15–24) were newly infected with HIV This is the most vulnerable age group, with unsafe sex being the commonest of causes of new HIV infections among them.

1.3 million people are estimated to be living with HIV in Zimbabwe out of the 15 million population. 91% of the people living with HIV were on antiretroviral therapy in 2021 In 2021, HIV accounted for 10.4% of all deaths in Zimbabwe compared to a global average of 1.1%.

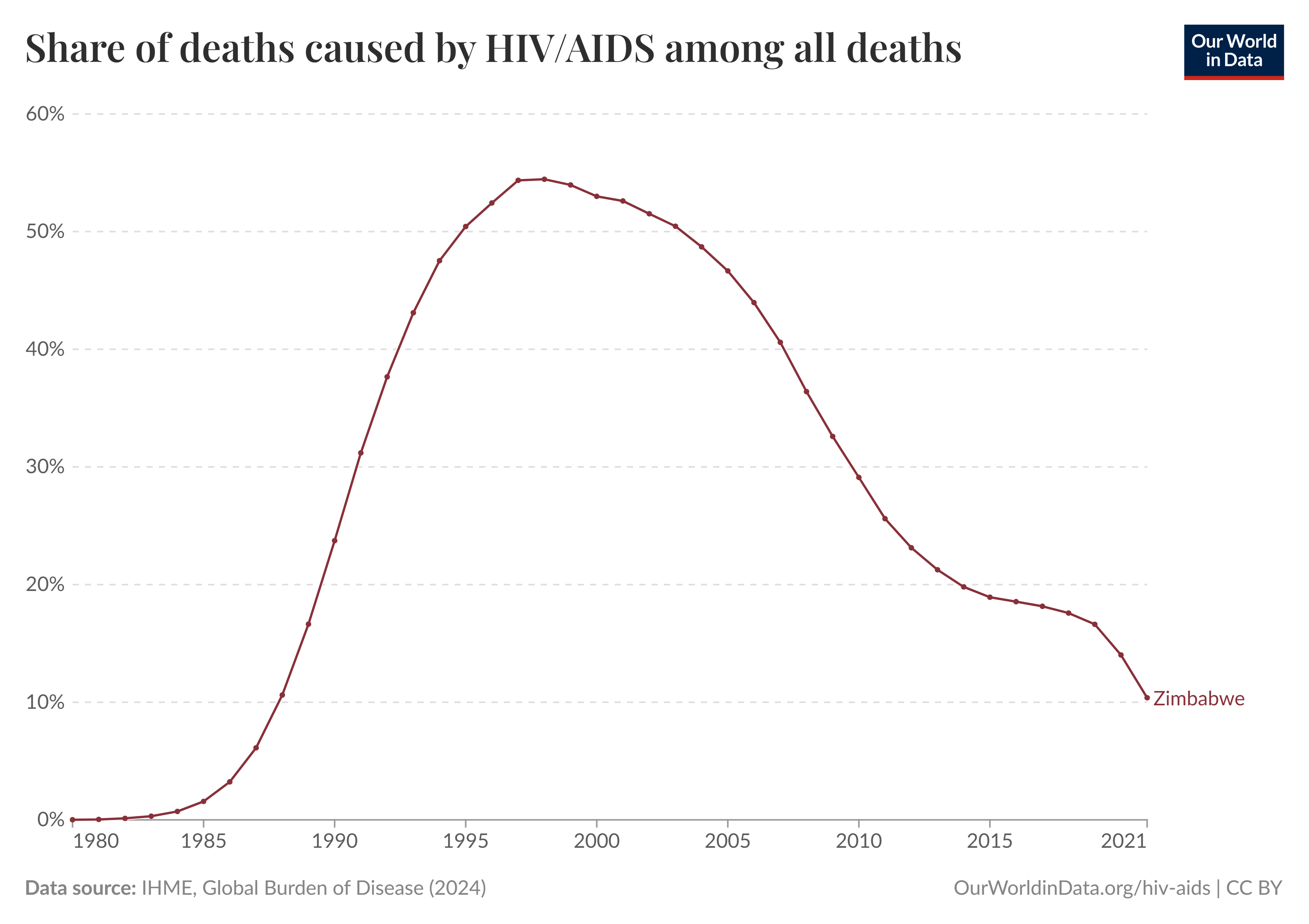
Share of deaths caused by HIV AIDS in Zimbabwe

HIV prevalence among adults aged 15-49 has decreased from 12.69% in 2019 to 10.49% in 2023. In December 2024, Zimbabwe reached the 95−95−95 UNAIDS Fast−Track targets for adults, marking notable strides in reducing HIV prevalence and strengthening HIV service delivery. These targets indicate that 95% of people living with HIV know their status, 95% of those diagnosed are receiving treatment and 95% of those treated achieved viral load suppression. There is also notable improvement in viral suppression rates among children living with HIV, from 70% in 2019 to 86% in 2023. This progress in HIV outcomes stems from the use of innovative prevention methods such as cabotegravir (CAB-LA)injection, and comprehensive prevention, testing, treatment initiatives, the adoption of differentiated service delivery models and rollout of child-friendly medicines. These efforts have been supported by key international partners including WHO, USAID, PEPFAR, UNITAID and the Global fund. In 2024, Zimbabwe was the first country in Africa and the third in the world behind Austria and the US to approve CAB-LA, a long acting injectable medicine recommended by WHO as pre-exposure prophylaxis(PrEP) for those at high risk of contracting HIV. Although the nation registers success in combatting HIV/AIDS, other people with the disease still refuse to take treatment.

=== Tuberculosis ===
Zimbabwe is ranked among the 22 countries with a significant burden of tuberculosis. In 2000, the incidence rate of tuberculosis reached 605 per 100,000 people and it dropped to 193 per 100,000 people in 2020 which is, however still way above the sustainable development goals target. The case detection rate fell from 83% in 2018 to 55% in 2020 which is the least Zimbabwe has experienced since 2000. This is mainly attributed to the crumbling health care system, a falling economy and the COVID-19 pandemic which saw a diversion of resources from TB to COVID-19. This can also be attributed the almost similar symptoms of TB and COVID-19 which was difficult to distinguish in Zimbabwe's under resourced health-care facilities.

=== Maternal and child health ===
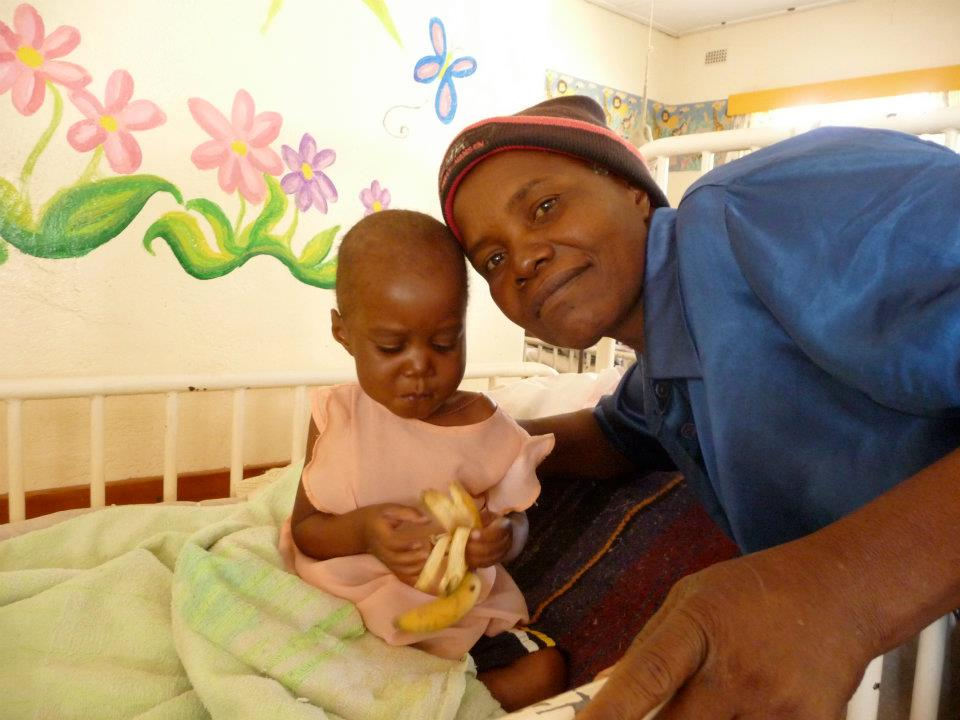
A mother and her child at Karanda Mission Hospital.

Inequalities in maternal health care are pervasive in the developing world, a fact that has led to questions about the extent of these disparities across socioeconomic groups. Zimbabwe's Ministry of Health and Child Care, in collaboration with the Zimbabwe National Statistics Agency, has been monitoring the demographic trends of Zimbabwe and published in 2025 very important information for the year 2023–24 through the Zimbabwe Demographic and Health Survey (ZDHS). The ZDHS provides information about fertility rates. More specifically, it shows significant progress in the maternal mortality ratio, with 212 deaths per 100,000 live births (a decrease from 615 deaths per 100,000 live births in 2015). At the same time, antenatal care coverage increased slightly from 91% in the 2015 ZDHS to 92% in 2023–24. Even though this is a small increase, it is not insignificant for the health of both infants and mothers, as 71% of pregnant women followed the "4+ ANC visits" schedule. As a result, a larger percentage of women (84%) chose hospitals for the safe delivery of their babies, while home deliveries decreased to 14%, compared to 16% in 2015.

The reference to the maternal mortality ratio is of great importance, as it indicates investment, empowerment, and development of the health system, and according to Miranda Tabifor, the representative of the United Nations Population Fund (UNFPA), "By prioritizing maternal health, lives are saved."

However, although the maternal mortality ratio decreased, the under-5 mortality, infant mortality, and neonatal mortality rates either remained the same or increased:

Under-5 mortality rate: remained the same as in 2015 — 69 deaths per 1,000 live births

Infant mortality rate: worsened to 56 deaths per 1,000 live births (from 50 deaths per 1,000 live births in 2015)

Neonatal mortality rate: increased to 37 deaths per 1,000 live births (from 29 deaths per 1,000 live births in 2015).

There was also a significant increase in the use of condoms, with 53% of sexually active people following the principles of safe sexual practices. This has slightly reduced the fertility rate to 3.9 children per woman in 2023–24, compared to 4 children per woman in 2015. This decrease also includes a decline in unintended teenage pregnancies.

Some of the most common diseases that these young children are facing are hunger: iron deficiency anaemia, vitamin A deficiency, and mentally impaired (iodine deficiency), and childhood diseases: acute respiratory infections, diarrhoeal disease, and malaria. 87% of women living with HIV were on antiretroviral therapy in 2021, which is a 10% decrease from 2019. 72,000 children between the ages of 0–14 years were living with HIV in 2021. This is about 144 times the total number of people living with HIV in Norway.

=== Challenges Affecting Maternal and Child Health ===
The challenges facing maternal and child health in rural Zimbabwe, with cultural preferences, religious beliefs, and a lack of healthcare infrastructure all contribute to poor health outcomes. The complexities of maternal health in this context, highlight the need for greater investment in healthcare infrastructure, better access to skilled healthcare workers, and more education and awareness about the risks of traditional birth practices. Colonial rule in Zimbabwe left a lasting imprint on the country's healthcare system. The decades of racial segregation and unequal distribution of resources have led to a situation where rural areas continue to suffer from poor healthcare infrastructure, inadequate access to skilled healthcare workers, and lower health outcomes.

Cultural beliefs and religious traditions in Zimbabwe often play a significant role in determining a woman's decision-making process during childbirth. Traditional practices such as home births, performed by traditional birth attendants without formal medical training, are still prevalent in many rural areas, especially among the older generation. These cultural preferences and religious beliefs, while deeply rooted in the community, can often come at the cost of the health and safety of the mother and child.

This legacy, combined with the challenges of political instability and a struggling economy, further complicates the provision of quality maternal healthcare in Zimbabwe, making it difficult to achieve meaningful improvements.

=== Contraception ===
Zimbabwe has been the central focus of promoting contraceptives and their methods of use to countries within Africa. It began a new industry where they produce wooden penises to be exported to other parts of Africa, for demonstration purposes. The use of contraceptives in Zimbabwe has definitely changed the size of its population and the growth rate – steadily declining. There are many civil servants who work for the government to promote and inform families in the rural areas of contraceptives and its uses.

Female condoms are used in Zimbabwe as a source of contraception. Their use is approximately 94-97% more effective in decreasing the risk of becoming infected with HIV, as compared to male condoms. It has been tested in Kenya, Thailand and the United States that female condoms are more efficient in terms of protecting the genital areas from becoming infected with STDs and STIs compared to male condoms. Female condoms became accessible for the Zimbabwean women after they signed petitions and presented them to the government to allow access to this source of contraception during the mid-1990s.

Recently, the use of contraceptives has been greatly demanded by the Zimbabwean youth.

A large number of the youth have proclaimed that they are embarrassed to go into pharmacies and clinics to obtain contraceptives, because the workers think that they are too young to be involved in sexual intercourse or sometimes it is frowned upon by the workers and the society due to the "no sex before marriage" belief. Due to this unfriendly service by the workers and the shame the society puts on these young adults, the youth demanded easier, faster access to the contraceptives from the Zimbabwean government. This indicates that the use of contraception is occurring in many parts of Zimbabwe – hence explaining its falling population growth rate. It also shows how truly Zimbabwe fulfills its duties as the country to promote contraception to other parts of Africa.

== Environmental conditions/factors affecting health ==
=== Water pollution ===
The state of water and its cleanliness in Zimbabwe is at its lowest. The nature of water and its function as the crucial element of life is known as the opposite for the people of Zimbabwe. In Zimbabwe, water contains life-threatening diseases due to contamination from industrial works. One of the major origins of water pollution is Zimbabwe's small industry of mining. By mining for gold, platinum, and other precious, expensive metal alloys, mining makes up for one third of the earnings from Zimbabwe's exports.

Although the mining industry is a profitable method of income for Zimbabwe, it is responsible for the many causes of water pollution. As they mine for precious metals, the miners are successful in finding them but also unfriendly guests of zinc, iron, nickel, copper and cobalt metals.

An excessive amount of these metals in water deteriorates the health of humans but also the lives of animals and plants – hence it is dangerous for any type of organisms to consume. For example, intakes of excessive zinc may cause internal organ damage and reduce the immune system's function. Although zinc is a major nutrient supplied with food, an excessive amount of it is harmful.

Other diseases that occur in Zimbabwe due to water pollution are cholera, typhoid, infectious hepatitis, Giardia, Salmonella, and Cryptosporidium. However, despite all this, because water is needed and the people of Zimbabwe are becoming more vulnerable and desperate, they consume this greatly contaminated water – hence, contamination-related health issues and epidemics arises.

=== Air pollution ===
Air pollution is also a growing problem in Zimbabwe, due to industries, poor waste management and transportation. The World Health Organization has set up a limit for the emission of sulfur dioxide to 20 μg/m^{3} 24-hour mean. In Harare, Zimbabwe, that limit has been exceeded to 200 mg/m^{3}. This is only the beginning of the reality of the air pollution in Zimbabwe, especially in its capital, Harare. The release of sulfur dioxide is harmful to the life of humans and other organisms. The inhaling of sulfur dioxide leads to lung diseases, breathing difficulties, formation of sulfurous acid along with the moisture of the mucous membranes causing a strong irritation and prevents the respiratory system's role in defending the body against foreign particles and bacteria. Hence, it can be concluded that the inhaling of sulfur dioxide is tremendously detrimental to the life of organisms. Not to mention, as sulfur dioxide is emitted into the atmosphere, it forms into acid precipitation as it reacts with water, nitrogen oxides and other sulfur oxides.

This is an ecological consequence that arises from the burning of fossil fuels, which is performed in many countries and many industries for the formation of energy, power plants, and automobiles. Acid precipitation can lead to asthma, bronchitis, lung inflammation, emphysema, and other lung and heart diseases. In 2007, the number of cars per 1000 person was 114, as compared to 17 cars per 1000 person in its neighbor, Zambia. Zimbabwe has a decently great number of cars, mostly all of which are low second-handed. These low second-handed cars do not meet the standard emission rates of Zimbabwe, hence being a greatly environment-polluting factor, becoming hazardous to the lives of Zimbabwe citizens.

Poor waste management also disrupts the harmony of health and the lifestyle of Zimbabwe. As mentioned above in water pollution, clean water is difficult to obtain. Hence, those who can afford bottled water are forced to buy them in order to provide themselves with drinking water. However, once they are done with using the bottles, the bottles are often thrown away or burned. The burning of plastic releases toxic and carcinogenic fumes, which if inhaled causes great damage on the body. Some of the chemicals released in this process are benzo(a)pyrene and other polyaromatic hydrocarbons. These fumes pollute the atmosphere, causing a greater long-term damage which will eventually work against the health and lifestyle of Zimbabwe.

== Medical personnel ==
As of 2022, public health clinics in the country are having to deal with an increasing shortage of nurses, due to emigration, in particular to the UK and Ireland, and to nurses seeking jobs in the private sector.

== See also ==
- Africa AHEAD
- COVID-19 pandemic in Zimbabwe
