= 2018–2019 Zimbabwe cholera outbreak =

Disease outbreak in Zimbabwe

- Disease: cholera
- Pathogen: Vibrio cholerae
- Location: Zimbabwe
- Index case: 1 September 2018
- Confirmed cases: 371

The 2018–2019 Zimbabwe cholera outbreak began on 1 September 2018, and the last reported case occurred on 12 March 2019. The Zimbabwean government declared a national emergency on 6 September 2018. The cholera outbreak originated in Glenview, a suburb in Harare, Zimbabwe's capital city, and then spread to the following provinces in Zimbabwe: Manicaland, Mashonaland East, Mashonaland West, Bulawayo, Mashonaland Central, Midlands, Masvingo and Matebeleland South. The last report from the World Health Organization (WHO) Afro regional office has listed the outbreak as a closed event with the outbreak running from 6 September 2018 to 12 March 2019. They were a total of 10,730 suspected cases however the confirmed cases were only 371.

There were several risk factors associated with the outbreak described by the WHO, including intermittent supplies in Harare, particularly in high-density suburbs such as Glenview, the epicenter of the outbreak. The city council was also unable to supply enough water for Harare, creating shortages due to the increasing urban population.

These shortages led to sanitation issues as people began to use unregulated wells and boreholes, leading people in Harare drinking contaminated water. The deteriorating sanitation infrastructure is leading to issues such as raw sewage flowing in areas of Harare. Another sanitation issue was the informal traders selling items such as fruit exacerbating the outbreak. Four cholera treatment centers were set up in Harare to deal with the initial outbreaking cholera. The WHO began a campaign to vaccinate 1.4 million people in Harare against cholera for people living in areas at most risk of contracting the disease in October 2018.

To address the water supply issues in key hotspots affected by cholera through increasing water supply through water trucking, adding water tanks, and repairing existing water infrastructure. To address sanitation issues, items such as soap and chlorination tablets were distributed to households in hotspot areas.

== See also ==
- 2008 Zimbabwean cholera outbreak
