= Tobacco in Zimbabwe =

Zimbabwe is the largest grower of tobacco in Africa, and the 4th largest grower in the world. Three types of tobacco have traditionally been grown in the country: Virginia flue-cured, burley and oriental tobacco. Over 95% of Zimbabwe’s tobacco consists of flue-cured tobacco, which is renowned for its flavor. The cash crop is a major part of Zimbabwe's economy. In 2017, tobacco accounted for 11% of the country's GDP, and 3 million of the country's 16 million people depended on tobacco farming for their livelihood. The main export market is China, which purchased 54% of Zimbabwe's exports in 2015.

== History of tobacco production ==
Season	Tobacco sales (million lb)	Notes
1910	0.1	
1946	41	
1950	107	
1957	139	
1965	325	
1971	132	

Tobacco was grown in Zimbabwe for subsistence purposes even before the British arrived in Africa. In 1889, the British South Africa Company established British rule over what became Southern Rhodesia. The European colonists reserved half of the country's land for their own use. The highveld was not desirable for growing food crops and raising livestock, so the Company turned to tobacco as a crop that could thrive in the sandy soil. Rhodesia modeled its tobacco industry on the United States, adopting American production methods to grow Virginia tobacco.

Rhodesian tobacco found a ready export market, as Rhodesia was in a customs union with South Africa and had Imperial Preference in the British market. By the 1950s, Rhodesia was producing over 100 million pounds of tobacco each year, 99% of it Virginia flue-cured tobacco. At its peak, Rhodesia produced 20% of the world's flue-cured tobacco.

In 1965, the white minority government of Rhodesia declared independence from Great Britain. International sanctions against Rhodesia eliminated many export markets, and the anti-smoking movement reduced global demand for tobacco. In 1968, Rhodesia was hit by the worst drought in 40 years. White farmers were also targeted for assassination by black rebels in the Rhodesian Bush War. As a result, the Rhodesian tobacco crop declined from 325 million pounds in 1965 to 132 million pounds in 1971.

=== Transition to black majority rule ===
In 1979, the civil war ended with the Lancaster House Agreement, which granted the country black majority rule. For the next 20 years, Robert Mugabe and his ZANU-PF government allowed the whites to keep farming the land. Tobacco production recovered and peaked at 260 million kilograms (570×10^{6} lb) in 1998.

=== Land redistribution ===
At independence, almost half of the country's arable land was owned by whites, who made up less than 5% of the population. Although land reform had been a major rallying cry of the black rebels, the Lancaster House Agreement prohibited nationalization of land before 1990. White-owned land could only be transferred to blacks on a "willing buyer, willing seller" basis, and purchases were funded by the British government. Although white farmers felt some apprehension as the 1990 deadline approached, no large-scale land confiscations took place.

In 1997, Tony Blair led the Labour Party to victory in the British general election after 18 years of Conservative rule. In 1999, Mugabe accused Blair of reneging on previous commitments made to Zimbabwe by the Conservatives. In 2000, Zimbabwe began to forcibly seize white-owned farmland without compensation and redistribute the land to blacks. The new black settlers were unskilled in tobacco farming and did not hold title to the land, so they lacked the collateral needed to obtain bank loans. Much of Zimbabwe's farmland went out of cultivation, and the tobacco crop bottomed out at 48 million kg in 2008, just 21% of the 2000 crop. Tobacco production in Zimbabwe hit record highs of 252 million kg in 2019 according to statistics from the Tobacco Industry and Marketing Board.

=== Recovery ===
In 2005, the contract system was introduced into Zimbabwe. Buyers like British American Tobacco began to contract with tobacco farmers to buy their entire crop at the end of the season. In return, the buyer would supply the farmer with all necessary inputs, including seed and fertilizer. Buyers also took greater responsibility for the crop, sending agronomists to the contracted fields to advise farmers on agricultural techniques and make sure that tobacco workers were paid on time.

In 2005, China Tobacco began to invest in Zimbabwe through its subsidiary, Tian Ze Tobacco. The entry of the Chinese into the Zimbabwean tobacco market drove up sales prices and improved contract terms. Farmers were able to lease agricultural equipment from Tian Ze on a 3-year repayment schedule. By 2016, Tian Ze was issuing US$40 million each year in interest-free loans to tobacco farmers.

Tobacco production recovered under the contract system of agriculture. The 2018 tobacco crop of 258 million kg was a new record for the post-land reform era, almost reaching the all-time peak of 260 million kg achieved in 1998. The structure of the industry has been completely overturned. 1,500 large-scale tobacco farmers grew 97% of the crop in 2000, but 110,000 small-scale tobacco farmers grew 65% of the crop in 2013. The white farmers had sold most of their tobacco at auction, but 80% of Zimbabwe's tobacco crop was grown under contract in 2016. Most of Zimbabwe's tobacco crop was sold to European and American companies in 2000, but 54% of Zimbabwe's tobacco exports were sold to China in 2015.

== Statistics ==
Tobacco produced in Zimbabwe

Year	million kg	±%
1980	125	—
1981	72	−42.4%
1982	91	+26.4%
1983	99	+8.8%
1984	125	+26.3%
1985	108	−13.6%
1986	116	+7.4%
1987	121	+4.3%
1988	115	−5.0%
1989	130	+13.0%

Year	million kg	±%
1990	130	+0.0%
1991	179	+37.7%
1992	211	+17.9%
1993	205	−2.8%
1994	182	−11.2%
1995	198	+8.8%
1996	209	+5.6%
1997	215	+2.9%
1998	260	+20.9%
1999	193	−25.8%

Year	million kg	±%
2000	228	+18.1%
2001		—
2002		—
2003		—
2004	69	—
2005	73	+5.8%
2008	48	−34.2%
2010	59	+22.9%
2011	124	+110.2%
2012	144	+16.1%

Year	million kg	±%
2013	167	+16.0%
2014	217	+29.9%
2015	189	−12.9%
2016	202	+6.9%
2017	189	−6.4%
2018	253	+33.9%
2019	258	+2.0%

Source: 1980–2000; 2004–2005; 2008; 2010–2013; 2014; 2015; 2016–2017; 2018–2019;

== See also ==
- Economy of Zimbabwe
- Tobacco industry
