= Zimbabwe Democracy and Economic Recovery Act of 2001 =

The Zimbabwe Democracy and Economic Recovery Act (S. 494, Pub. L. 107–99 (text) (PDF)) is an act passed by the United States Congress which imposed economic sanctions on Zimbabwe, allegedly to provide for a transition to democracy and to promote economic recovery.

Senators Bill Frist (R-Tennessee) and Russ Feingold (D-Wisconsin) introduced the bill on March 8, 2001. Senators Frist, Jesse Helms (R-North Carolina), Hillary Clinton (D-New York), and Joseph Biden (D-Delaware) sponsored the bill. The Senate passed the bill on August 1 and the House of Representatives passed the bill on December 4. President George W. Bush signed it into law on December 21.

== Vote overview ==
ZDERA was passed by with 91% (396 vote) of Congress voting in favor of the bill. Of the 396 votes, 194 were Democrats, 200 were Republicans, and 2 were Independent. 3% (11 votes) of Congress voted against ZDERA: 2 Democrats, 8 Republicans, and 1 Independent. 6% (26 votes) did not vote, 15 Democrats and 11 Republicans.

== Policy ==
ZDERA's policy was stated to "support the people of Zimbabwe in their struggle to effect peaceful, democratic change, achieve broad-based and equitable economic growth, and restore the rule of law." This policy was supported by the following findings made by the U.S. Congress:

1. The Government of Zimbabwe was unable to participate in programs created by the International Bank for Reconstruction and Development and International Monetary Fund Program (IMF) to assist in the transformation and resuscitation of Zimbabwe's economy. Furthermore, said exclusion to the people of Zimbabwe from the economic and democratic benefits laid out by program donors, including the United States, was because of "economic mismanagement, undemocratic practices, and the costly deployment of troops to the Democratic Republic of the Congo" by the Zimbabwean Government.
2. The IMF suspended support under a "Stand By Arrangement" in September 1999 that was approved in August 1999 for economic adjustment and reform. In October 1999, all structural loans, credits, and guarantees to the Government of Zimbabwe were suspended from the International Development Association (IDA). This was followed by a complete suspension of new lending to the Government of Zimbabwe by the IDA in May 2000. By September 2000, the IDA suspended all funds to the Government of Zimbabwe for ongoing projects.

== Means of support ==
ZDERA proposed two sectors of financial support for the Zimbabwean economy under the imposed sanctions.

1. Bilateral debt relief: the Secretary of the Treasury would conduct a review of the ability of "restructuring, rescheduling, or eliminating the sovereign debt of Zimbabwe held by any agency of the U.S. Government."
2. Multilateral debt relief and other financial assistance: the Secretary of the Treasury would be allowed to direct the U.S. executive director of each multilateral development bank to "propose that the bank should undertake a review of the feasibility of restructuring, rescheduling, or eliminating the sovereign debt of Zimbabwe held by that bank" as well as to instruct the U.S. executive director of international financial organizations to which the U.S. is a member to proposition financial and technical support for Zimbabwe. Particularly if these means promoted "economic recovery and development, the stabilization of the Zimbabwean dollar, and the viability of Zimbabwe's democratic institutions."

== Financial sanctions and requalifications ==
The following criteria were included in the guidelines of ZDERA and were stipulated as law until certain criteria were fulfilled or, exceptionally, it was necessary to meet "basic human needs or for good governance." As such, the Secretary of the Treasury instructed the U.S. executive director of each international financial institution to "oppose and vote against" the following:

1. any extension by the respective institution of any loan credit, or guarantee to the Government of Zimbabwe;
2. any cancellation or reduction of indebtedness owed by the Government of Zimbabwe to the United States or any international financial institution.

The following were certifications that once satisfied would lift the aforementioned restrictions:

1. Restoration of the rule of law: including "respect for ownership and title to property, freedom of speech and association, and an end to the lawlessness, violence, and intimidation sponsored, condoned, or tolerated by the Government of Zimbabwe, the ruling party, and their supporters or entities.
2. Electoral Conditions: That Zimbabwe has held a presidential election that is widely accepted as free and fair and the president-elect is free to assume the duties of the office

OR

that the Government of Zimbabwe has sufficiently improved the pre-election environment to a degree consistent with accepted international standards for security and freedom of movement and association.

1. Transparent Land Reform: The Government of Zimbabwe has demonstrated a commitment to an equitable, legal, and transparent land reform program consistent with agreements reached at the International Donors' Conference on Land Reform and Resettlement in Zimbabwe held in Harare, Zimbabwe, in September 1998.
2. Fulfilling the agreement to end the war in the DRC: The Government of Zimbabwe is making a good faith effort to fulfill the terms of the Lusaka, Zambia, agreement on ending the war in the Democratic Republic of Congo. However, this section was removed with the amendments to ZDERA in 2018.
3. Military and police: The Zimbabwean Armed Forces, the National Police of Zimbabwe, and other state security forces are responsible to and serve the elected civilian government.

== Additional actions ==
It was further recommended from Congress that the President should begin immediate consultations with European Union nations, Canada, and other suitable nations to identify ways to:

1. identify and share information regarding individuals responsible for the deliberate breakdown of the rule of law, politically motivated violence, and intimidation in Zimbabwe;
2. identify assets of those individuals held outside Zimbabwe;
3. implement travel and economic sanctions against those individuals and their associates and families; and
4. provide for the eventual removal or amendment of those sanctions.

== Repeal of ZDERA ==
Bill S. 3722, the Zimbabwe Sanctions Repeal Act of 2010, sponsored by Senator James Inhofe (R-Oklahoma) was introduced into the Senate Foreign Relations Committee in 2010. A vote was never taken. Bill S. 1646, a Zimbabwe Sanctions Repeal Act of 2011, sponsored again by Senator James Inhofe (R-Oklahoma) was introduced into the Senate Foreign Relations Committee in October 2011. A vote has yet to be taken.

== Critical reception ==
Simbi Mubako, Zimbabwe's ambassador, and Cynthia McKinney (D-Georgia) accused supporters of the bill of anti-black racism. McKinney referred to the bill as "nothing more than a formal declaration of United States complicity in a program to maintain white-skin privilege [...] under the hypocritical guise of providing a transition to democracy."
