= Sandy Cairncross =

British epidemiologist

Alexander "Sandy" Messent Cairncross OBE (born 8 March 1948) is an epidemiologist at the London School of Hygiene and Tropical Medicine (LSHTM). He has an interest in environmental interventions for disease control, including both technical issues and policy.

== Family ==
Sandy Cairncross is a member of the notable Cairncross family which originates in Lanarkshire. He was born to Mary Frances (née Glynn) and the economist, Sir Alexander Kirkland Cairncross. His sister is academic and journalist Frances Cairncross. His uncle, John Cairncross was an intelligence officer, spy and double agent.

== Academic career ==
Cairncross was educated at King's College School, Wimbledon, and Corpus Christi College, Cambridge, where he graduated with honours in mechanical sciences (engineering) in 1969. He subsequently received a PhD in soil mechanics from the University of Cambridge.

He is a public health engineer by profession and an epidemiologist by vocation. Most of his career has been spent in research and teaching, and about a third in developing countries implementing water, sanitation and public health programmes. His experience includes building water supplies in Lesotho, and seven years as a water and sanitation engineer for the Government of Mozambique, shortly after that country's independence.

Sandy is Research Director of the DFID-funded SHARE Research Consortium, whose aim is applied research on sanitation & hygiene, with partners WaterAid, Shack Dwellers International, the International Institute for Environment and Development, and the International Centre for Diarrhoeal Disease Research, Bangladesh.

He is also Deputy Director of the African SNOWS Consortium to build research capacity of six African universities in water, sanitation & environmental health.

Cairncross was appointed Officer of the Order of the British Empire (OBE) in the 2011 Birthday Honours for services to environmental health overseas.

In January 2014, Cairncross was awarded the Edwin Chadwick Medal in recognition of his outstanding contributions to the advancement of public health.

== Charity work ==
Until 2015, he served as chair of trustees to Teaching-aids at Low Cost (TALC), an international non government organization with charitable status based in Hertfordshire. He is also Chair of Africa AHEAD.

== Writing and research ==
He has worked on or contributed to a number of books, including a textbook on environmental health engineering in the tropics.
