= Simbi Mubako =

Zimbabwean diplomat

Simbi Veke Mubako is the former ambassador of Zimbabwe to the United States. He graduated with a BA degree in political science and history from Roma College, Lesotho, LLB from Trinity College Dublin, M.Phil from the London School of Economics, and an LLM from Harvard Law School.

Mubako attributed Western opposition to the government of Robert Mugabe as a continued campaign by the British government to colonize Zimbabwe.

Mubako and Cynthia McKinney, a representative in the United States House of Representatives, accused supporters of the Zimbabwe Democracy and Economic Recovery Act of 2001 of racism.
