= Zimbabwe national budget =

The Zimbabwe national budget comprises revenue and spending of Zimbabwe central government. The government primarily spends on capital goods, education, defense and health care programs. Zimbabwe's central government have faced budget shortfalls for the last 3 years since 2021 and is also projecting another in 2024.

== Budgets ==
- 2024 Zimbabwe national budget
- 2023 Zimbabwe national budget
- 2022 Zimbabwe national budget
- 2021 Zimbabwe national budget
- 2020 Zimbabwe national budget
- 2019 Zimbabwe national budget
- 2018 Zimbabwe national budget
- 2017 Zimbabwe national budget

== See also ==
- 1997 Zimbabwean Black Friday
