= Water supply and sanitation in Zimbabwe =

Water supply and sanitation in Zimbabwe is defined by many small scale successful programs but also by a general lack of improved water and sanitation systems for the majority of Zimbabwe. According to the World Health Organization in 2012, 80% of Zimbabweans had access to improved, i.e. clean, drinking-water sources, and only 40% of Zimbabweans had access to improved sanitation facilities. Access to improved water supply and sanitation is distinctly less in rural areas. There are many factors which continue to determine the nature, for the foreseeable future, of water supply and sanitation in Zimbabwe. Three major factors are the severely depressed state of the Zimbabwean economy, the willingness of foreign aid organizations to build and finance infrastructure projects, and the political stability of the Zimbabwean state.

== History ==
Upon gaining independence in 1980 Zimbabwe inherited an undeveloped rural water supply and sanitation infrastructure system, but a better functioning urban water supply and sanitation network. Conditions throughout the 1980s and the early 1990s were highly advantageous to Zimbabwe's water and sanitation sectors due to the massive support for the incoming elected majority government as well as an influx of foreign investment. This support manifested itself in the highly ambitious Integrated Rural Water Supply and Sanitation Programme (IRWSSP) in 1985. The IRWSSP attempted to provide improved water and sanitation facilities to all rural Zimbabweans by 2005. Although IRWSSP did not achieve this goal, it was still greatly beneficial as Zimbabwe experienced, according to the African Development Bank, "one of the highest rates of growth in water supply and sanitation services" between the years 1980 to 2000. However, after the turn of the millennium, Zimbabwe's economy has gone through a period of steep decline and many foreign investors have departed. This is partly due to political reforms, especially those of land reform, enacted by the government of President Robert Mugabe. In addition, Zimbabwe's population has been steadily growing over the last thirty years, and as a result there is a pressing need for updating and expanding aging water and sanitation infrastructure throughout Zimbabwe. The deteriorating water supply and sanitation sectors caught up with Zimbabwe in 2008 and 2009, as Zimbabwe experienced a massive cholera outbreak (Zimbabwean cholera outbreak), during which almost 100,000 were infected and over 4,000 died.

== Sector overview ==
=== Geography ===
Zimbabwe is a landlocked country and therefore its major water supplies are lakes, rivers, and aquifers. The two major rivers in Zimbabwe are the Zambezi River in the north, and the Limpopo River in the south. Several other rivers with significant watershed areas that flow through Zimbabwe are the Save, Manyame, and Sanyati Rivers. The biggest lake in Zimbabwe is Lake Kariba which is on the border with Zambia. There are several large aquifers in Zimbabwe.

=== Technical infrastructure ===
In urban centers of Zimbabwe the majority of the water supply comes from piped water. In rural areas, Zimbabweans predominantly rely on wells and boreholes that tap into Zimbabwe's groundwater supply. The construction of many wells was mainly financed by the households themselves. The dynamic development of the private sector is a good example of how self-supply initiatives can reach large parts of the population. Many Zimbabweans still practice open defecation, especially in rural areas. However, in large urban centers such as Harare, there are sewage systems, and many homes throughout Zimbabwe have private pit latrines or share communal latrines.

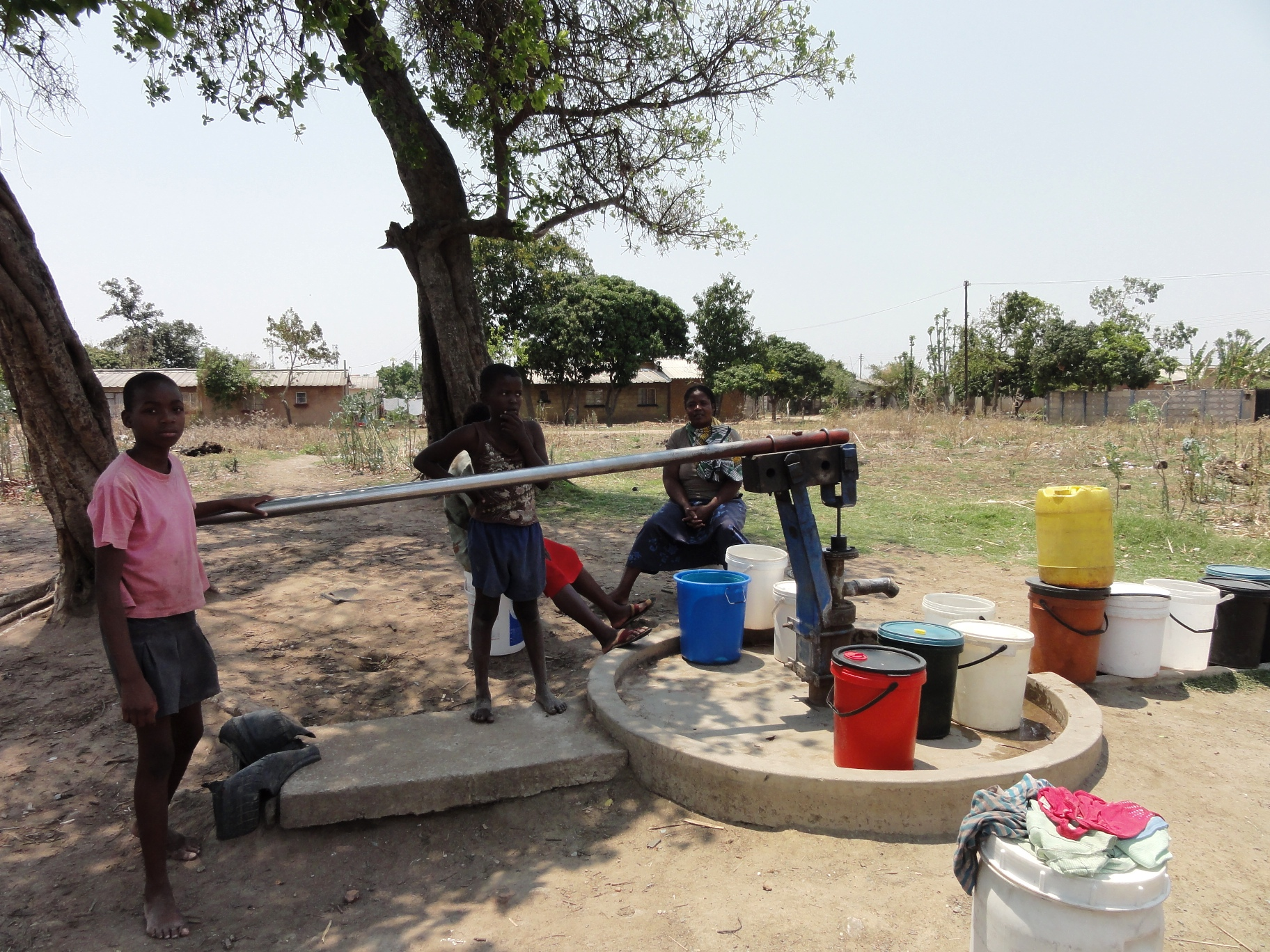
A group of women and children at a borehole in Norton, Zimbabwe

In 2018 problems at the Morton Jeffray Waterworks in Harare were said to be the cause of the renewed cholera outbreak.

Several promising technological innovations have greatly improved the access to and quality of water supply in Zimbabwe. For example the Zimbabwean Bush Pump has been highlighted as a "fluid" technology that has greatly expanded access to cleaner water throughout the country. The diffusion of this technology can be understood because of its remarkable adaptability. The implementation, operation, and repair of the bush pump is determined by the input and choices of local communities, and as such this technology has no "hard boundaries" since it can be adapted, utilized, and personalized by communities throughout Zimbabwe.

=== Current issues ===
According to UNICEF, over 60% of the rural water supply infrastructure in Zimbabwe is in a state of disrepair, and as a result, many boreholes and wells contain non potable water and are in need of decontamination. Even in urban centers, piped water supply is very sporadic and sometimes unclean. This is partly due to poor sanitation and refuse systems resulting in many sewers which are often highly polluted. There is also a pressing inadequacy in the number of public and private latrines. An additional problem that comes with the need to update and expand an aging and contaminated water supply and sanitation network (well, boreholes, piped water, latrines, etc.) is the need to educate all members of the Zimbabwean public on available opportunities for improving personal access to improved water supply and sanitation. During the cholera outbreak of 2008-2009 information from the Zimbabwean government about the safety of available water supplies people was particularly unclear. One method that has proved effective at improving the sanitation practices of the public are community health clubs, which have also proved to be cost effective and highly popular.

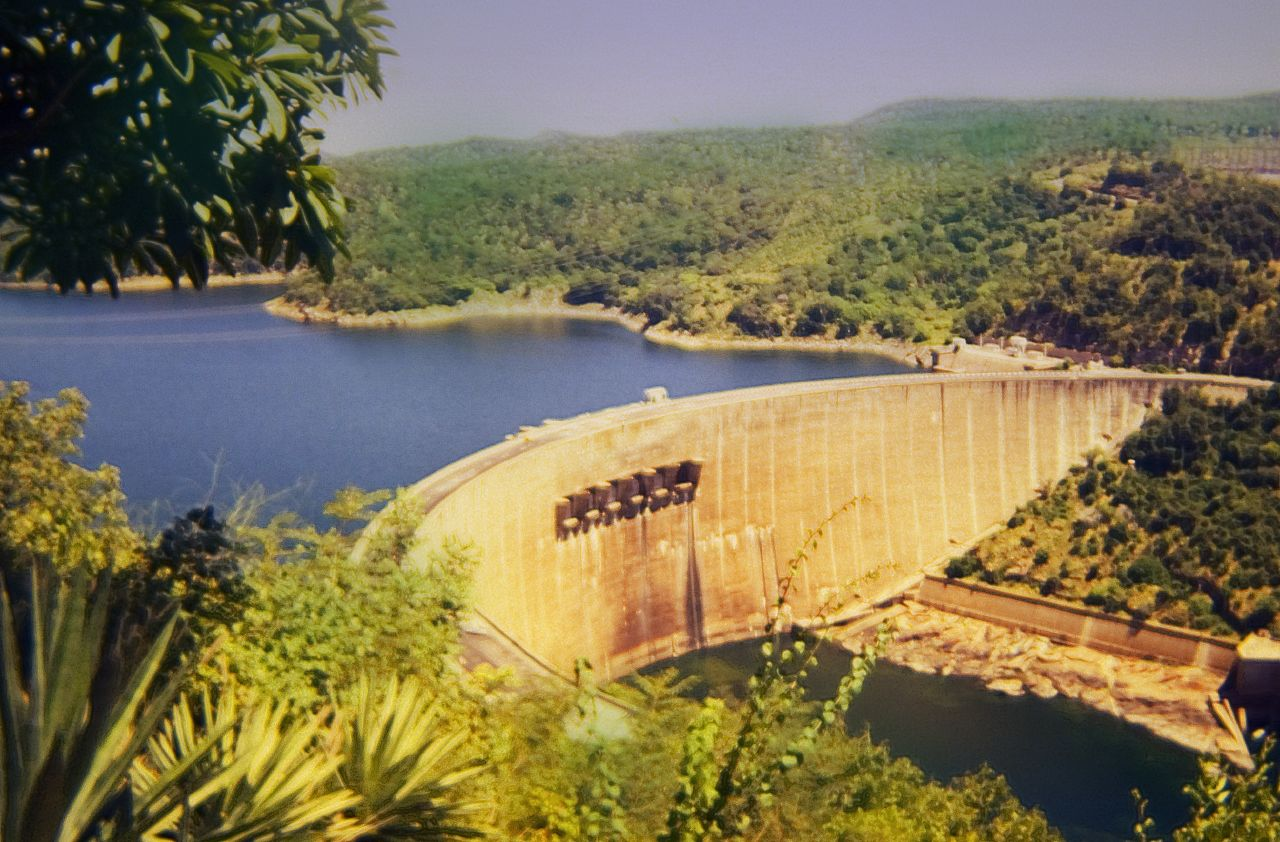
Kariba dam as seen from Zimbabwe.

== Institutional overview ==
Water supply and sanitation in Zimbabwe is managed by a number of different governmental ministries and departments. The overarching organizations that control all water resources are the National Action Committee or NAC, and the Ministry of Water Resources Development and Management (MoWRDM). These groups directly oversee the WASH coalition, a combination of NGOs (Non-Governmental Organizations), UNICEF, and other private groups, that is chaired by the Ministry of Health and Child Welfare, and which finances and builds sanitation and water supply systems in the hope of fulfilling the UN Millennium Development Goal. In addition, the NAC and MoWRDM also oversee the Zimbabwe National Water Authority (ZINWA) which chiefly deals with water supply and distribution to the industrial, agriculture, and private sectors. ZINWA is subdivided into different areas of water catchment. Additionally, ZINWA oversees the 250 major dams in Zimbabwe. As well as this, the NAC is divided into two subcommittees, the Rural Water Supply and Sanitation Committee and the Urban Water Supply and Sanitation Committee, which are composed of many different governmental agencies and are responsible for the planning and infrastructure of water supply and sanitation in rural and urban areas respectively. Local water distribution is overseen by local village or regional governments and sometimes by ZINWA itself.

== External cooperation ==
A number of foreign governments and NGOs are actively working to improve water supply and sanitation in Zimbabwe through both small and large scale infrastructure projects. As well as actively participating, these organizations finance many other efforts. These organizations include the World Bank, the African Development Bank (AfDB), and the German Government, who through its technical cooperation agency, Deutsche Gesellschaft für Internationale Zusammenarbeit (GIZ), gave $6 million (US) to improve the water supply and sanitation systems in the towns of Gweru, Kadoma, and Kariba. The Australian government also provided over $10 million (US) for water supply and sanitation system improvements and research.

=== WASH sector ===
UNICEF is currently managing several programs in collaboration with the entire WASH program to ameliorate water and sewage systems. These include updating sanitation systems in the towns of Masvingo, Plumtree, and Zvishavane, and managing a $30 million (US Dollars) project to provide potable water and improved sanitation to 500,000 Zimbabweans. As well as this, UNICEF and the entire WASH program are working towards providing safe water and sanitation to 2.3 million people in Zimbabwe currently without access to improved water and sanitation.

== Environmental concerns ==
As a result of mining, industry, large scale unsustainable agriculture, and somewhat lax and unenforced pollution laws, many rivers and lakes in Zimbabwe are polluted. This has made drinking and bathing in these rivers and lakes unsafe. In particular the water of several rivers that go through the Marange diamond fields in eastern Zimbabwe has been so polluted that it has killed livestock that drank it and given rashes to bathers. Another area of Zimbabwe with especially high levels of water pollution is Harare and its nearby suburbs. This is due to the large population of Harare, decrepit and broken sewage systems, and mismanagement by government agencies designated to enforce environmental and water quality regulations. Fortunately, there are programs in place that inspect the quality of the water of many of the major rivers as well as gauging stations that measure the water supply levels of Zimbabwe's dams.

== Human concerns ==
=== Effects of water quality on health ===
The lack of improved water supply and sanitation severely impacts the human capabilities of all Zimbabweans. Without clean water and proper sanitation human beings are more prone to contracting illnesses, and therefore suffer greater rates of morbidity and mortality due to these illnesses. Improved water supply and sanitation sectors are shown to be highly effective at reducing the rates of morbidity and mortality for many illnesses including ascariasis, cholera, diarrhea, dracunculiasis, hookworm infection, schistosomiasis, and trachoma. Diarrhea is an especially serious disease considering it is the largest killer of children under the age of five in Africa. Cholera is also a serious sickness in Zimbabwe.

=== Open defecation ===
The serious effects of unimproved water supply and sanitation on health and human dignity are reasons why one of the UN Millennium Development Goals was to halve "the proportion of the population without sustainable access to safe drinking water and basic sanitation". One key facet of the Millennium Development Goal was limiting the number of people who openly defecate which UNICEF estimates is currently at 40% of Zimbabweans in rural areas. Open defecation can be an infringement on human dignity that lowers human capabilities and a risk to clean sanitation and health.

=== Gender equality ===
By creating improved water supply and sanitation facilities women's lives achieve greater agency. It is often women who are responsible for providing the water supply used by the family on a day-to-day basis. As a result of a family having clean bathrooms and a safe water supply within close proximity of its dwelling, women spend less time collecting water and more time pursuing their own ambitions or doing other necessary work. In addition the lack of clean bathrooms in many Zimbabwean schools prevent girls from attending school while menstruating. Thus, eliminating poor sanitation and increasing access to potable water greatly increases human dignity and capabilities.

== See also ==
- Human rights in Zimbabwe
- Water supply and sanitation in South Africa
- Water supply and sanitation in Sub-Saharan Africa
- Water supply and sanitation in Zambia
