= Metallon Corporation =

Zimbabwean gold mining company

Metallon Corporation Ltd
- Type: Private Limited Company
- Industry: Mining
- Founded: 2002
- Products: Gold
- Website: http://metcorp.co.uk/

Metallon Corporation is a gold producer, developer and explorer with operations in Zimbabwe. Metallon is Zimbabwe's largest gold mining company operating three gold mines throughout the country. The chairman of the company is Mzi Khumalo.

Metallon Corporation is the 100% owner of three gold mining companies in Zimbabwe. In 2015, gold production was 97,000 ounces and the target is 100,000 ounces. Across the Group Metallon has a significant resource base with a JORC-compliant 5.2 million ounce resource (Golder 2018).

Metallon Corporation is looking to increase its production to 500,000 ounces.

In 2019, nine illegal miners were killed in Metallon Corporation's Mazowe underground mine, 10 km north of Harare.
