= Zimbabwe Women Microfinance Bank =

Coordinates: 17°49′37″S 31°02′47″E

- Company type: Parastatal
- Industry: Financial services
- Founded: May 29, 2018; 8 years ago
- Headquarters: Harare, Zimbabwe
- Key people: Mandas Makarinda; Chief Executive Officer
- Products: Loans, savings accounts
- Total assets: US$10 million (2018)

Zimbabwe Women Microfinance Bank (full name: Zimbabwe Women Microfinance Bank Limited) is a deposit-taking microfinance institution in Zimbabwe. The bank serves those members in the community, who have been un-reached by conventional commercial banks, particularly rural women. Its mission is to empower all women economically and socially.

== Location ==
The bank maintains its headquarters and main branch in the Trust Towers Building, along Samora Machel Avenue in the central business district of Harare, the capital and largest city of Zimbabwe. The geographical coordinates of the bank's headquarters are:17°49'37.0"S, 31°02'47.0"E (Latitude:-17.826944; Longitude:31.046389).

== Overview ==
As of June 2018, the bank's assets were valued at US$10 million, all of it being shareholders' equity. A that time the bank maintained one branch, in downtown Harare. Media reports indicate that it is the first Women's bank in Southern Africa. While serving customers regardless of gender, the bank focuses on delivering services to women, specially rural women with emphasis on the previously un-banked. Services offered include savings accounts with low opening deposits, group accounts, availability in rural areas, lending to micro, small and medium enterprises and provision of financial literacy classes. During the first ninety days, the bank opened nearly 9,000 client accounts.

== History ==
After a period of planning, the Reserve Bank of Zimbabwe granted a microfinance banking license to Zimbabwe Women Microfinance Bank Limited to commence operations on 29 May 2018. The bank commenced banking services on Tuesday 12 June 2018.

== Ownership ==
The company is 100 percent owned by the Zimbabwean government, through the Zimbabwe Ministry of Women's Affairs, Gender and Community Development.

== See also ==
- Banking in Uganda
- List of banks in Uganda
