= Indigenisation and Economic Empowerment Act =

2008 Zimbabwean law expropriating foreign-owned companies

On March 9, 2008, Zimbabwe's president, Robert Mugabe, signed the Indigenisation and Economic Empowerment Bill into law. The bill was passed through parliament in September 2007 by President Mugabe's party, the Zimbabwe African National Union-Patriotic Front (ZANU-PF), in spite of resistance by the opposition party, Movement for Democratic Change (MDC).

== Description ==
The law will give Zimbabweans the right to take over and control many foreign-owned companies in Zimbabwe. Specifically, over 51 per cent of all businesses in the country will be transferred into local African hands. The bill defines an indigenous Zimbabwean as “any person who before the 18th of April 1980 was disadvantaged by unfair discrimination on the grounds of his or her race, and any descendant of such person.”

The law does not specify whether or not the transfer of ownership would simply apply to mergers and restructurings in the future, or if it applies to all current companies. The minister for indigenisation and empowerment would have the power to allow some companies to be exempt of the transfer law for some time. This is not a new idea; there have been proposals for similar transfer actions, but they have all come up fruitless. The Zimbabwean government has promised the foreign-owned companies that are soon to be taken over that authorities would help the businesses set timetables for the transfer of business shares to local black Zimbabweans. Even before the bill became law, it had repercussions on investors and foreign companies such as Orascom Telecom, a mobile phone company.

== Context ==
President Mugabe's administration had already redistributed the commercial farms owned by non-black African farmers to poor native Zimbabweans. This policy ended up chasing some white farmers out of the country, leading to a lack of any new investment and a huge decline in farm output. In a short time, Zimbabwe went from a net exporter of food to a net importer. This led to a rise in food prices, as less food was being grown and harvested. Because the prices of food were too high for most people to afford, the president then set price controls on many products, discouraging their production. Many of these same items were available on the black market, which led to an increasing inflation rate.

== Impact ==
After details of the law became public:

- The H. J. Heinz Company is said to be closing operations in Zimbabwe.
- Old Mutual, a financial institution, sold 20 per cent of its company in Zimbabwe to local staff.

== Criticisms ==
The MDC had claimed the bill was simply a ploy by Mugabe's parties to win votes in the elections. Other critics argued that the bill would only bring money to a few elite Zimbabweans instead of the masses of impoverished locals that were promised to benefit from the bill.

Many economists worry that this new law will be the end of Zimbabwe's already rapidly failing economy. In 2008, Zimbabwe had the world's highest inflation rate at more than 165,000 per cent. This came to an end when the use of foreign currencies was legalized in January 2009.

Many Zimbabweans worry that the Indigenisation and Economic Empowerment Bill has come too late to have any meaningful effect. Zimbabwe once had many prosperous growth centres, shopping centres built in rural areas as a way to bring in urban facilities to people who would have had to travel miles to get to a city. Now these rural areas have regressed to poverty, because the government has no funds to take care of the centres or build new ones. As the years went by, fewer and fewer people were buying things because their purchasing power was being worn away by inflation. Rural construction was becoming less of a necessity and more of a luxury. Shops used to be fully stocked with many commodities, but they became sparsely filled or in some case completely bare.
