= Mzi Khumalo =

South African businessman (born 1955)

- Born: Mzilikazi Khumalo; November 1955 (age 70)
- Occupation: Businessman
- Known for: CEO of Metallon
- Spouse: Khosi Khumalo

Mzi Godfrey Khumalo (born 4 November 1955) is a South African businessman and mining entrepreneur.

== Early life ==
Raised by a single mother, Khumalo grew up in KwaMashu‚ Durban. One of ten siblings, his father died before he was nine years old. As a young boy, Khumalo made money buying and selling old oil cans and, later, made an income from buying and selling fuel.

In the 1970s, Khumalo joined the African National Congress, serving in its military wing. In 1978, he was arrested and charged with treason, and sentenced to 20 years in prison on Robben Island. He served alongside figures such as Nelson Mandela for anti-apartheid activities before being released in 1990. He was the 27th prisoner to enter Robben Island in 1979, and was given prisoner number 2779.

Khumalo holds a Bachelor of Commerce degree from the University of South Africa.

== Business ==
He has held the position of Chairman at various companies, including JCI Limited and Point Waterfront Corporation.

Khumalo founded financial services company Capital Alliance Holdings, which was later sold with $8 billion of assets under management.

He is Chairman of Gold and General, which owns the majority shares in Metallon Corporation as well as other family investments. Alongside mining, he has interests in the telecommunications industry.
