= Community Health Clubs in Africa =

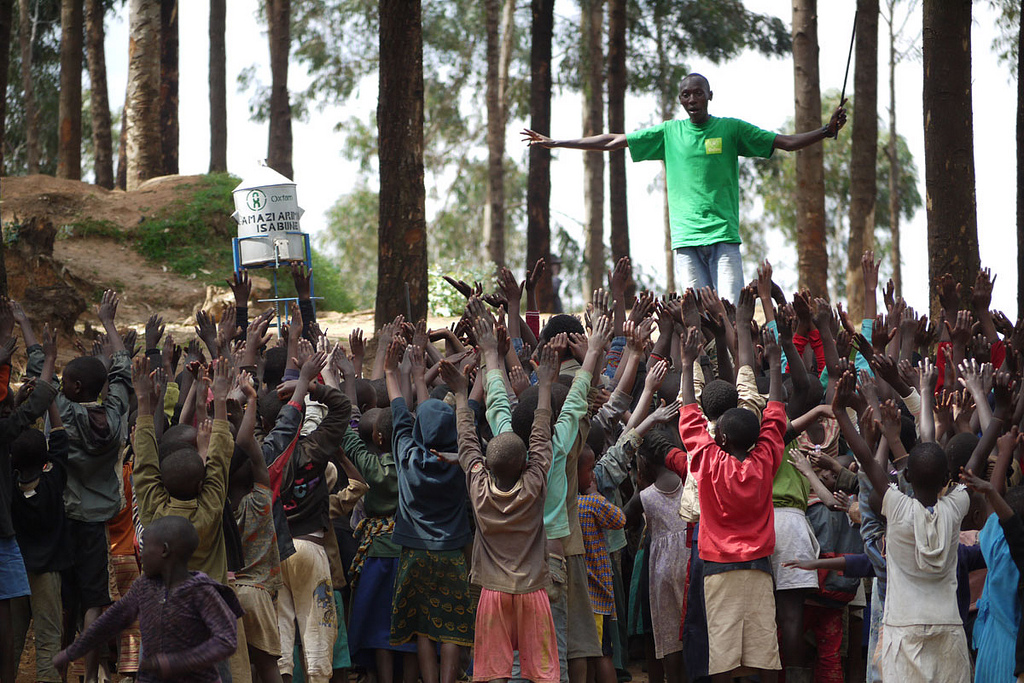
A children's hygiene club in a village in Kenya

Community health clubs (CHCs) also known as community hygiene clubs are voluntary community-based organizations in Africa dedicated to improving public health through the promotion of hygiene. CHCs are formed at the village level. The concept was developed and popularized by Africa AHEAD, a Zimbabwe NGO.

== History ==
The idea of CHCs originated in Kenya, where Juliet Waterkeyn developed illustrations for training materials to be used for the Kenya Water for Health Organisation (KWAHO). She observed the living conditions and habits of rural Kenyan communities. She claimed that a lack of ownership was the cause for slow community development. The concept of CHC was developed to gather communities and communally discuss hygiene to improve the health of children.

== Operation ==
Community Health Workers (CHW) and Environmental Health Technicians (EHT) often help run the clubs. They receive one week of training; they are given the training materials and taught how to use them.

The two types of CHCs are Classic and Lite. The difference is the length of the training of the CHWs and the number of dialogue sessions that they are trained to offer.

CHCs attract an average of 75 members, which includes an elected six member committee, a chairperson, a secretary and a Community Health Worker (CHW) facilitator. The facilitator is responsible for leading dialogue sessions and motivating club members to adopt better hygiene. Classic CHCs have a training session of 6 months where the club meets weekly to discuss one of the 20 - 24 dialogue sessions on health and hygiene. Lite CHCs have a training period of 3 months and discuss a total of 8 dialogue sessions concentrating only on WASH topics.

After each session, members are given homework and are encouraged to complete it before the next session. Each member is given a membership card when they join the club, and the CHW is responsible for signing off the dialogue sessions attended by each member. A certificate of completion is awarded to club members that complete all dialogue sessions.

== Process ==
The four main CHC stages:

=== Health Promotion ===
Members meet weekly for a two-hour session. During these sessions cards are used to engage members in discussions and debates on topics promoting health and hygiene. Various participatory activities take place that entertain and encourage members to get involved in the decision-making process on improving daily hygiene habits. Members are encouraged to make small changes in their own homes each week. These recommended practices rarely require financial expenditure and are solely habit changing.

=== Safe Drinking Water and Sanitation ===
Once club members begin to understand the transmission of germs. When a majority of the members become convinced, peer pressure makes sanitation a priority and club members help each other meet their new hygiene standards. Latrines and wells are dug, hand washing facilities are built without outside funds. The maintenance of water facilities is the responsibility of the CHC committee. At the end of this stage, high-risk habits have been replaced by safe hygiene practices and basic safe water and sanitation facilities are available.

=== Food Agriculture and Nutrition (FAN) ===
Members focus on child survival and a balanced diet. Communal nutrition gardens are started by CHC members where produce is organised to maintain a balanced year-round diet. These gardens help to support vulnerable families.

=== Empowerment of Women ===
CHC meetings can result in the construction of a permanent meeting shelter, which can be used for day care for toddlers. Other clubs start income generating projects such as soap making, whilst others create saving and loan schemes to enable members to buy products needed to maintain hygiene standards. As most CHCs have more female members, the clubs end up becoming a safety net for mothers.

== See also ==
- Community-led total sanitation
- Sustainable Sanitation Alliance
