= GBDT (digital token) =

Investment instrument

Gold-backed digital token, abbreviated as GBDT is an investment instrument used in Zimbabwe. It was formerly known as ZiG, but its name was taken by a newly created gold backed currency, the Zimbabwean ZiG, thus renaming this investment instrument to GBDT. The digital coins are not loanable.

== Background ==
Zimbabwe has been struggling with inflation and exchange rate instability since reintroduction of 5th Zimbabwean dollar in February 2019. In a bid to restore order and stopping speculative behavior on local currency, the central bank introduced a gold backed digital coin, which have some currency features.

== Features ==
The value of one GBDT token unit was defined as one milligram of 99% fine gold on the first day of trade for the currency.

== Performance ==
A total of 736.5 kilograms (23,680 ozt) was bought by corporates and individuals as of 28 February 2024, under this scheme.

== See also ==
- Zimbabwean dollar (1980–2009)
- Zimbabwean dollar (2019–2024)
- Zimbabwean ZiG
