= Mosi-oa-Tunya (coin) =

Zimbabwean currency, introduced in 2022

Demographics
- User(s): Zimbabwe

Issuance
- Central bank: Reserve Bank of Zimbabwe

Valuation
- Value: international market rate for an ounce of gold plus 5%

The Mosi-oa-Tunya (English: The Smoke Which Thunders) is a gold coin introduced in Zimbabwe in 2022 in the context of rising inflation.

== Background ==
Mosi-oa-Tunya is the Lozi name for Victoria Falls and translates into the English language as The Smoke Which Thunders. The coins weigh one troy ounce and are made of 22 carat gold. They were minted outside of Zimbabwe. Each coin has a unique serial number.

The Reserve Bank of Zimbabwe distributed 2,000 Mosi-oa-Tunya to commercial banks on 25 June 2022. They can be used for normal retail purposes. The coins were introduced in the context of instability with existing local currency and Zimbabweans' tendency to use the U.S. dollar. The coins are worth the international market rate for a troy ounce of gold, plus five percent.

The 1/2 Oz Mosi-oa-Tunya coin has been confirmed.

== See also ==
- Economy of Zimbabwe
- Zimbabwean bond notes
- Zimbabwean bond coins
- Zimbabwe Gold
- Mosi-oa-Tunya National Park
- Zimbabwean dollar (1980–2009)
- Zimbabwean dollar (2019–2024)
- Krugerrand
- Dedollarisation
