= Zimbabwean dollar =

Zimbabwean dollar may refer to:

- Zimbabwean dollar (1980–2009)
- Zimbabwean dollar (2019–2024)
