= Zimbabwean bonds =

Form of legal tender near money

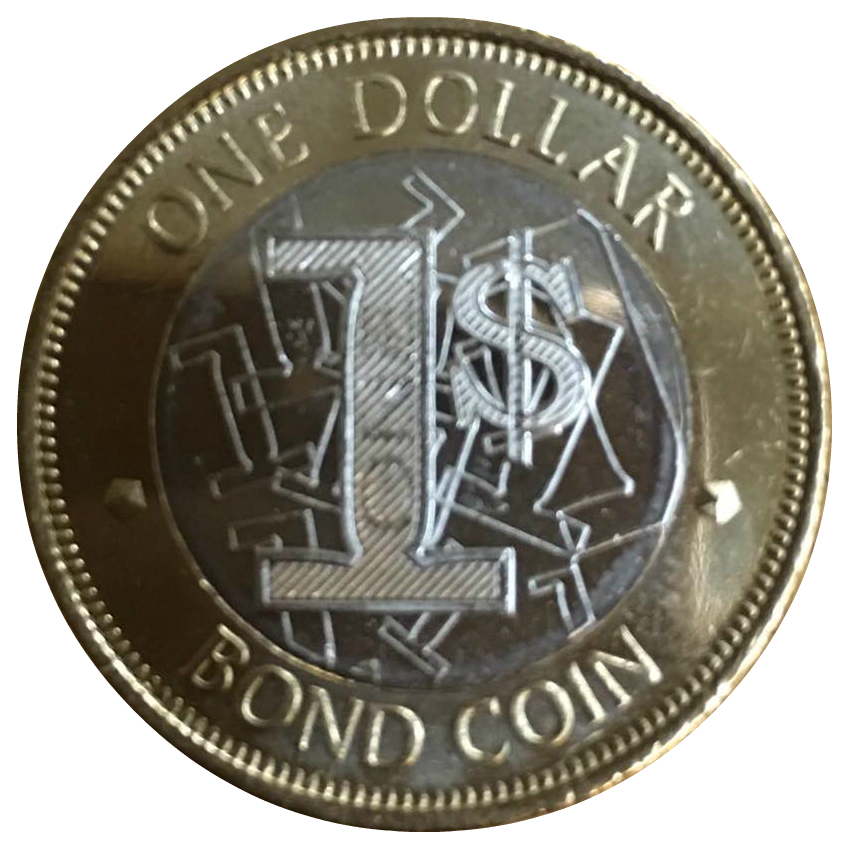
- Zimbabwe 1-dollar bond coin

ISO 4217
- Code: none

Unit
- Symbol: $

Denominations
- Subunit
- 1/100: cent
- Banknotes: $2, $5
- Coins: 1¢, 5¢, 10¢, 25¢, 50¢, $1, $2

Demographics
- User(s): Zimbabwe

Issuance
- Central bank: Reserve Bank of Zimbabwe

Valuation
- Pegged by: (United States) U.S. Dollar
- This infobox shows the latest status before this currency was rendered obsolete.

Zimbabwean Bonds were a form of legal tender near money released by the Reserve Bank of Zimbabwe which attempts to resolve Zimbabwe's lack of currency. Bonds were pegged against the U.S. dollar at a 1:1 fixed exchange rate and backed by the country's reserve. Since abandoning the Zimbabwean dollar in 2009 after it went into hyperinflation the country began using a number of foreign currencies including the U.S. dollar, South African rand, British pound and Chinese yuan as a means of exchange. The inability to print these currencies led to a shortage of money with banks issuing limits on withdrawals.

== Coins ==
On 18 December 2014 the Reserve Bank of Zimbabwe began issuing so-called 'bond coins' which were supported by a US$50 million facility extended to the Reserve Bank of Zimbabwe by Afreximbank (the African Export–Import Bank). Pegged against the U.S. dollar coins were denominated at 1, 5, 10, and 25 cents and later followed by a 50-cent coin in 2015. A bi-metallic one-dollar bond coin was released on 28 November 2016. A bi-metallic two-dollar bond coin was released into circulation in 2018.

in 2024, the Zimbabwean ZiG was introduced and replaced the Zimbabwean dollar.

== Banknotes ==
In November 2016 backed by a US$200 million Afreximbank loan, the Reserve Bank of Zimbabwe began issuing $2 bond notes. Two months later US$15 million worth of new $5 bond notes were also released. Further plans for $10 and $20 bond notes were ruled out by the central bank's governor, John Mangudya.

Preceded by: Multi-currency system Reason: shortage of hard currency Ratio: at par with the US dollar	Currency of Zimbabwe; 2014 – 2019; Note: Part of a multi-currency system	Succeeded by: Fifth Zimbabwean dollar Reason: attempted dedollarisation Ratio: at par
