= Hyperinflation in Zimbabwe =

Periods of currency instability

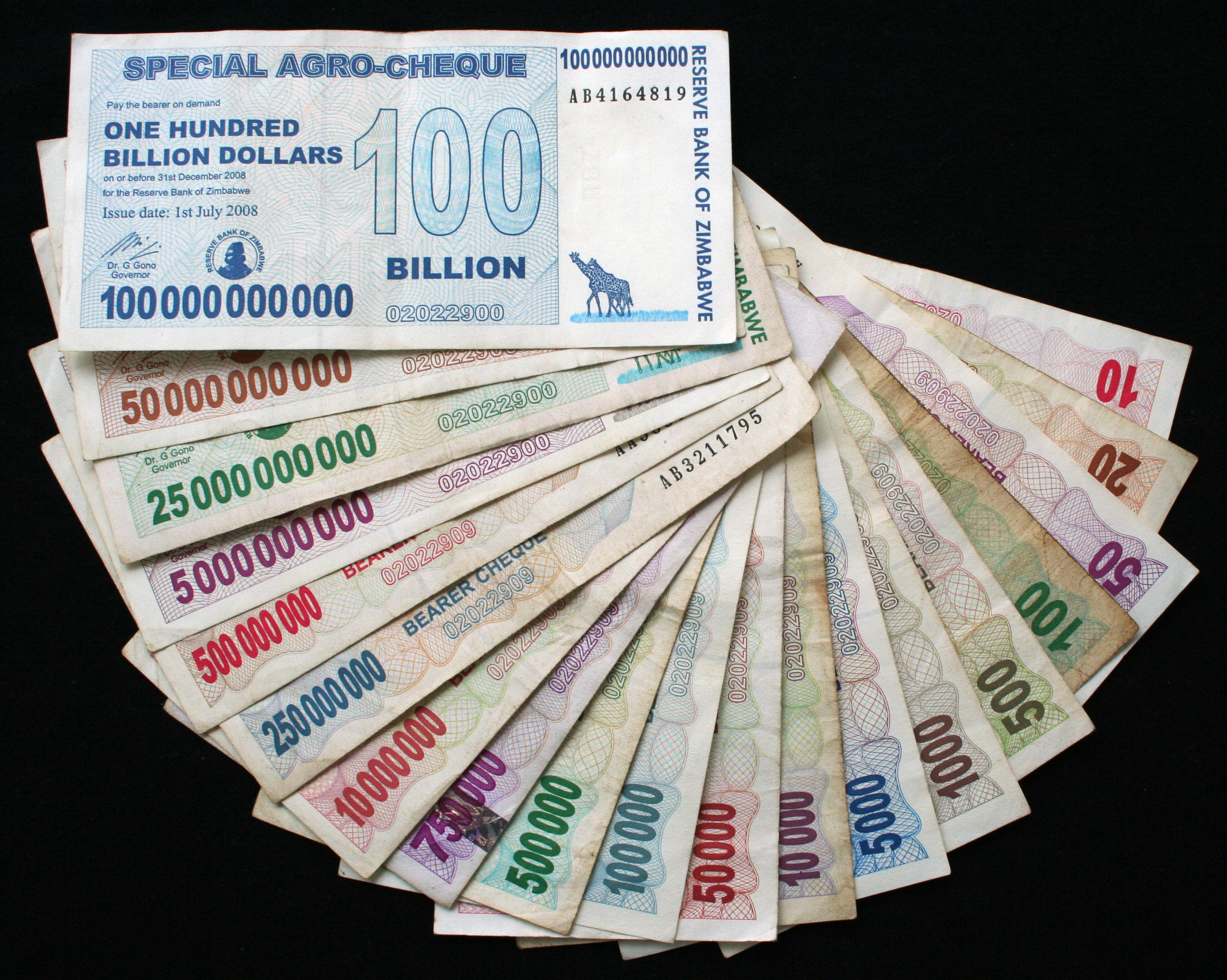
Zimbabwean banknotes ranging from 10 dollars to 100 billion dollars printed within a one-year period. The magnitude of the currency scalars signifies the extent of the hyperinflation.

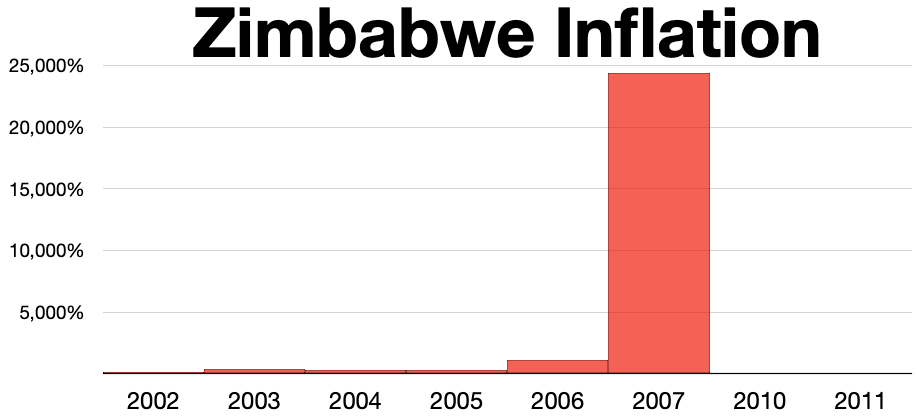
Zimbabwe's inflation of almost 250,000% in 2007

The economy of Zimbabwe has been undergoing hyperinflation since February 2007, according to Cagan's definition of hyperinflation. During the height of inflation from 2008 to 2009, it was difficult to measure Zimbabwe's hyperinflation because the government of Zimbabwe stopped filing official inflation statistics. However, Zimbabwe's peak month of inflation is estimated at 790.6 billion percent month-on-month, 89.7 sextillion (8.97×10^{22}) percent year-on-year in mid-November 2008. At that time, a $100 trillion banknote could not pay for a simple bus fare.

In April 2009, Zimbabwe stopped printing its currency, and currencies from other countries were used. In mid-2015, Zimbabwe announced plans to completely switch to the United States dollar by the end of that year.

In June 2019, the Zimbabwean government announced the reintroduction of the Real Time Gross Settlement dollar (RTGS), to be known simply as the "Zimbabwe dollar", and that all foreign currency was no longer legal tender. By mid-July 2019, inflation had increased to 175%, sparking concerns that the country was entering another period of hyperinflation. In March 2020, with inflation above 500% annually, a new task force was created to assess the currency problems. By July 2020, annual inflation was estimated to be 737%.

== Historical context ==
On 18 April 1980, the Republic of Zimbabwe was born from the former Republic of Rhodesia. The Rhodesian dollar was replaced by the Zimbabwean dollar at par value. When Zimbabwe gained its independence from the United Kingdom, the newly introduced Zimbabwean dollar was initially more valuable than the United States dollar at the official exchange rate. However, that did not reflect reality because, in terms of purchasing power on the open and black markets, it was less valuable, due primarily to the higher inflation in Zimbabwe. In its early years, Zimbabwe experienced strong growth and development. Wheat production for non-drought years was proportionally higher than previously, and the tobacco industry was thriving. Economic indicators for the country were strong.

From 1991 to 1996, the Zimbabwean ZANU–PF President Robert Mugabe embarked on an Economic Structural Adjustment Programme (ESAP) that had serious negative effects on Zimbabwe's economy. In the late 1990s, the government instituted land reforms in the name of anti-colonialism intended to evict white landowners and place their holdings in the hands of black farmers. However, many of the new farmers had no experience or training in agriculture. Many farms simply fell into disrepair or were given to Mugabe loyalists. From 1999 to 2009, the country experienced a sharp drop in food production and in all other sectors. The banking sector also collapsed, with farmers unable to obtain loans for capital development. Food output fell 45%, and manufacturing output fell by 29% in 2005, 26% in 2006 and 28% in 2007. Unemployment rose to 80%. Life expectancy dropped. Much of the nation's middle class fled the country en masse taking much of the nation's capital. The Reserve Bank of Zimbabwe blamed the hyperinflation on economic sanctions imposed by the United States of America, the IMF, and the European Union. These sanctions affected the government of Zimbabwe, asset freezes and visa denials targeted at 200 specific Zimbabweans closely tied to the Mugabe regime. There were also restrictions placed on trade with Zimbabwe, by both individual businesses and the US Treasury Department's Office of Foreign Assets Control.

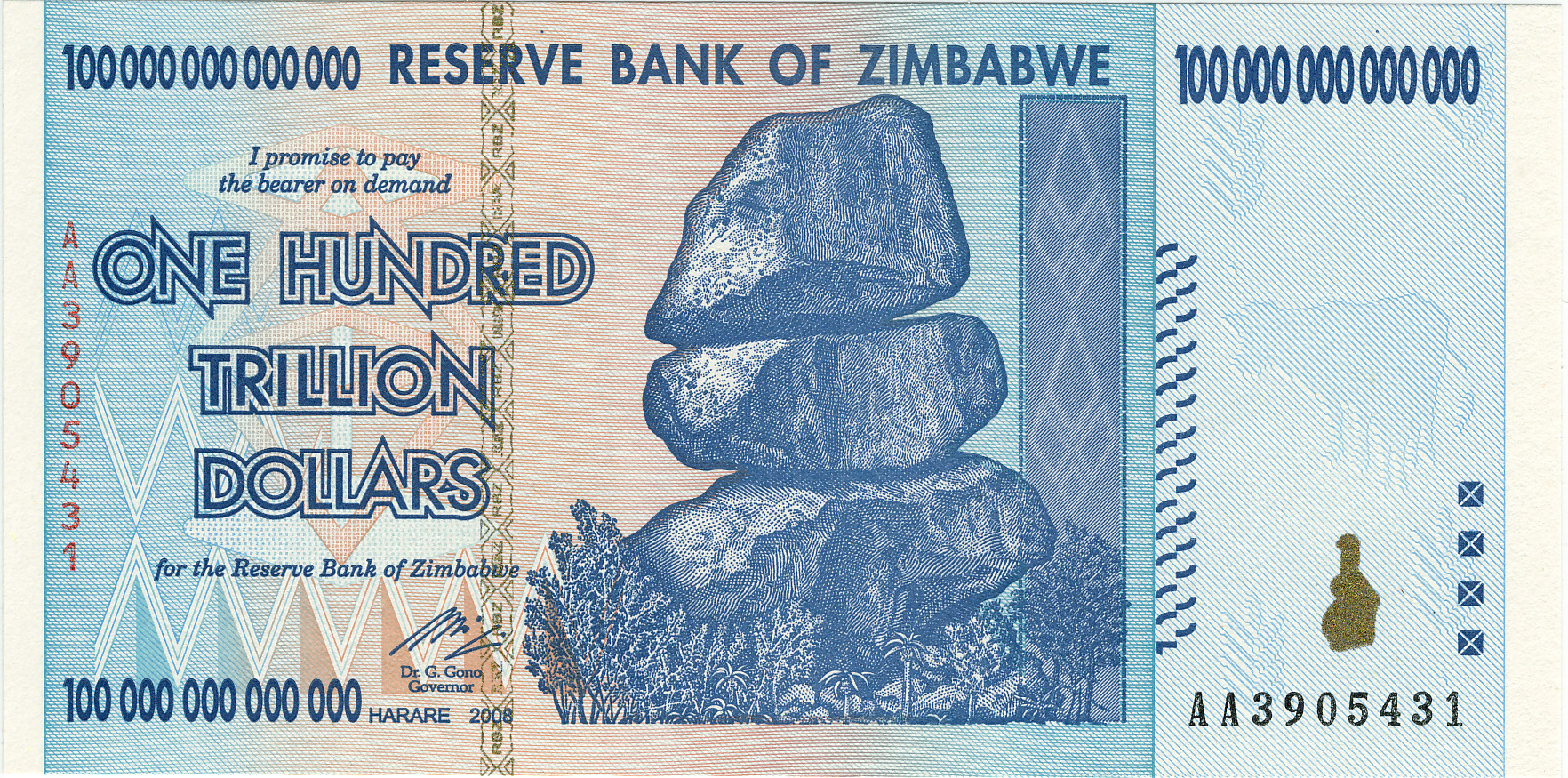
The largest denomination of a Zimbabwean banknote (Z$100,000,000,000,000, 1×10^{14}, or 100 trillion)

A monetarist view is that a general increase in the prices of things is less a commentary on the worth of those things than on the worth of the money. This has objective and subjective components:

- Objectively, that the money has no firm basis to give it a value.
- Subjectively, that the people holding the money lack confidence in its ability to retain its value.

Crucial to both components is discipline over the creation of additional money. However, the Mugabe government was printing money to finance military involvement in the Democratic Republic of the Congo and, in 2000, in the Second Congo War, including higher salaries for army and government officials. Zimbabwe was under-reporting its war spending to the International Monetary Fund by $22 million a month.

Another motive for excessive money creation has been self-dealing. Transparency International ranks Zimbabwe's government 157th of 177 in terms of institutionalised corruption. The resulting lack of confidence in government undermines confidence in the future and faith in the currency.

Economic missteps by government can create shortages and occupy people with workarounds rather than productivity. Though this harms the economy, it does not necessarily undermine the value of the currency, but may harm confidence in the future. Widespread poverty and violence, including government violence to stifle political opposition, also undermines confidence in the future. Land reform lowered agricultural output, especially in tobacco, which accounted for one-third of Zimbabwe's foreign-exchange earnings. Manufacturing and mining also declined. An objective reason was, again, that farms were put in the hands of inexperienced people; and subjectively, that the move undermined the security of property.

Government instability and civic unrest were evident in other areas. Zimbabwean troops, trained by North Korean soldiers, conducted a massacre in the 1980s in the southern provinces of Matabeleland and Midlands, though Mugabe's government cites guerrilla attacks on civilian and state targets. Conflicts between the Ndebele people and Mugabe's government have led to many clashes. There was also unrest between black people and white people, in which the land reform was a factor. One aspect of this reform sought to discriminate against white people specifically and many were forced by the regime to sign over their businesses to the black majority.

The Reserve Bank of Zimbabwe responded to the dwindling value of the dollar by repeatedly arranging the printing of further banknotes, often at great expense from overseas suppliers. On 1 March 2008, it was reported that documents obtained by The Sunday Times showed that the Munich company Giesecke & Devrient (G&D) was receiving more than €500,000 (£381,562) a week for delivering bank notes equivalent to Z$170 trillion a week. By late 2008, inflation had risen so high that ATMs for one major bank gave a "data overflow error" and stopped customers' attempt to withdraw money with so many zeros.

=== Self-perpetuation ===
Also in Zimbabwe, neither the issuance of banknotes of higher denominations nor proclamation of new currency regimes led holders of the currency to expect that the new money would be more stable than the old. Remedies announced by the government never included a believable basis for monetary stability. Thus, one reason the currency continued to lose value, causing hyperinflation, is that so many people expected it to.

== Inflation rate ==
Zimbabwean inflation rates since independence (up to July 2008, estimates thereafter)
Date	Rate	Date	Rate	Date	Rate	Date	Rate	Date	Rate
1980	7%	1986	15%	1992	40%	1998	48%	2004	133%
1981	14%	1987	10%	1993	20%	1999	57%	2005	586%
1982	15%	1988	7%	1994	25%	2000	55%	2006	1,281%
1983	19%	1989	14%	1995	28%	2001	112%	2007	6.62×10^{5}% (662,000%)
1984	10%	1990	17%	1996	16%	2002	199%	July 2008	2.315×10^{9}% (2,315,000,000%)
1985	10%	1991	48%	1997	20%	2003	599%	mid-Nov 2008	7.96×10^{10}% (79,600,000,000%)

Over the course of the five-year span of hyperinflation, the inflation rate fluctuated greatly. At one point, the US Ambassador to Zimbabwe predicted that it would reach 1.5 million percent. In June 2008, the annual rate of price growth was 11.2 million percent. The worst of the inflation occurred in 2008, leading to the abandonment of the currency. The peak month of hyperinflation occurred in mid-November 2008 with a rate estimated at 79,600,000,000% per month, with the year-over-year inflation rate reaching an astounding 89.7 sextillion percent. This resulted in US$1 becoming equivalent to Z$2,621,984,228.

On 13 July 2007, the Zimbabwean government said that it had temporarily stopped publishing inflation figures, a move that observers said was meant to draw attention away from "runaway inflation which has come to symbolise the country's unprecedented economic meltdown". In 2008, the inflation rate accelerated dramatically, from a rate in January of over 100,000% to an estimated rate of over 1,000,000% by May, and nearly 250,000,000% in July. As predicted by the quantity theory of money, this hyperinflation was linked to the Reserve Bank of Zimbabwe increasing the money supply.

== Old Mutual Implied rate ==
As hyperinflation accelerated, the value of the Zimbabwean dollar declined rapidly against other currencies, yet official exchange rates published by the Reserve Bank of Zimbabwe were infrequently updated; this made it impossible to tell from an official source how much the Zimbabwe dollar was really worth against other currencies on a particular day, which in turn disrupted international business transactions involving Zimbabwe dollars. Staff from WM/Reuters devised an indirect means of measurement that was termed the Old Mutual Implied Rate (OMIR). This took the daily price of Old Mutual shares traded in the London and Harare stock markets and used it to derive a national daily exchange rate between the Zimbabwe dollar and the pound. Shares had much looser capital controls than the Zimbabwean banking system, so they were used as a vehicle for moving capital between currencies by buying stock in either London or Harare and then selling in the other location.

The Old Mutual Implied rate was a widely adopted benchmark rate for unofficial currency exchange until intervention by the Reserve Bank of Zimbabwe in May 2008 prohibited the transfer out of the country of shares in Old Mutual, ABC and Kingdom Meikles Africa, thereby blocking their fungibility.

== Adaptations ==
=== Use of foreign currencies ===
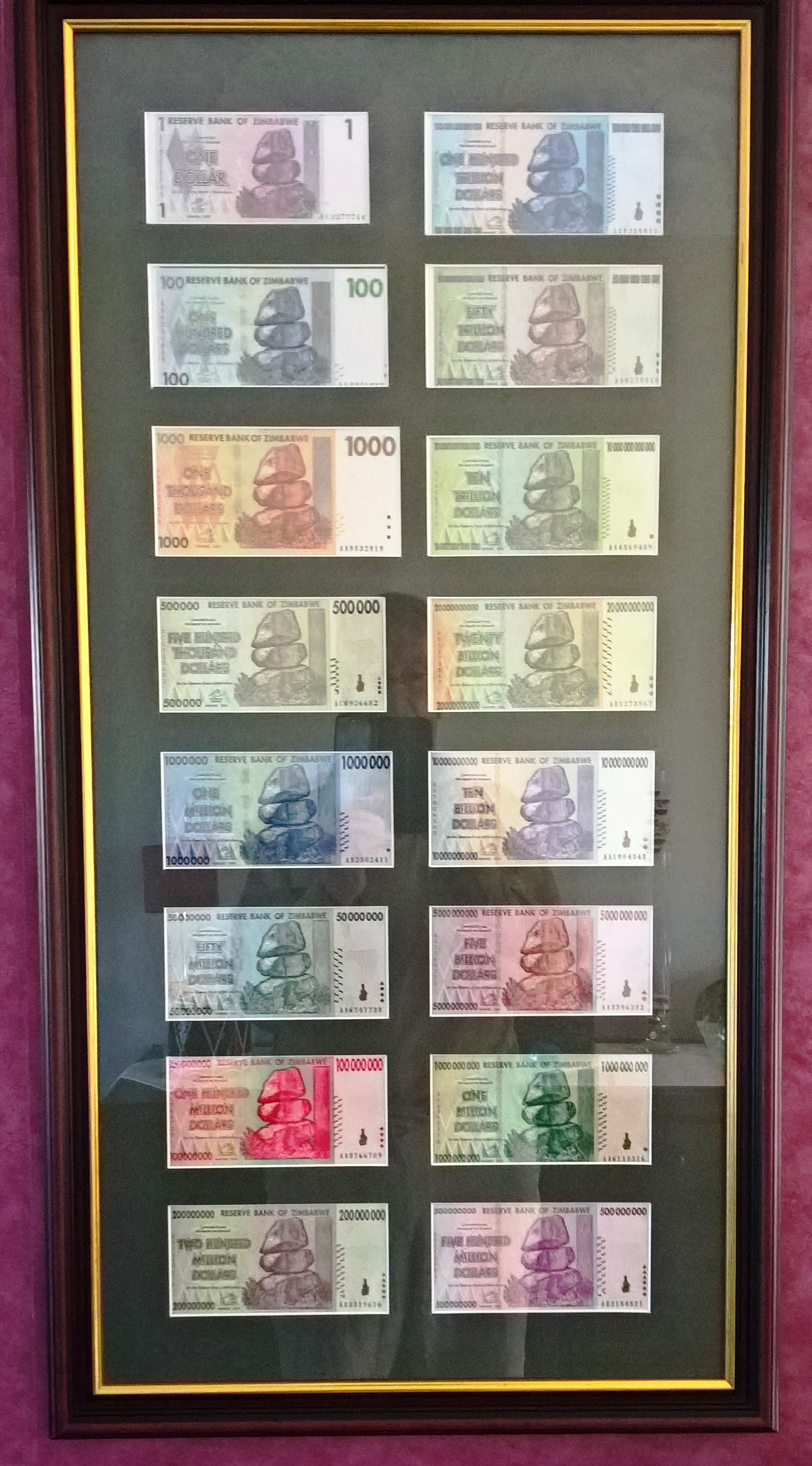
Selection of 16 original uncirculated Zimbabwe notes ranging in denomination from 1 dollar to 100 trillion dollars. They are all signed by G Gono, the Governor of the Reserve Bank of Zimbabwe, in the period 2007 to 2008, who promises "to pay the bearer on demand". In 2007 Gideon Gono gained a PhD in Strategic Management from the Atlantic International University.

In 2007, the government declared inflation illegal. Anyone who raised the prices for goods and services was subject to arrest. This amounted to a price freeze, which is usually ineffective in halting inflation. Officials arrested numerous corporate executives for changing their prices.

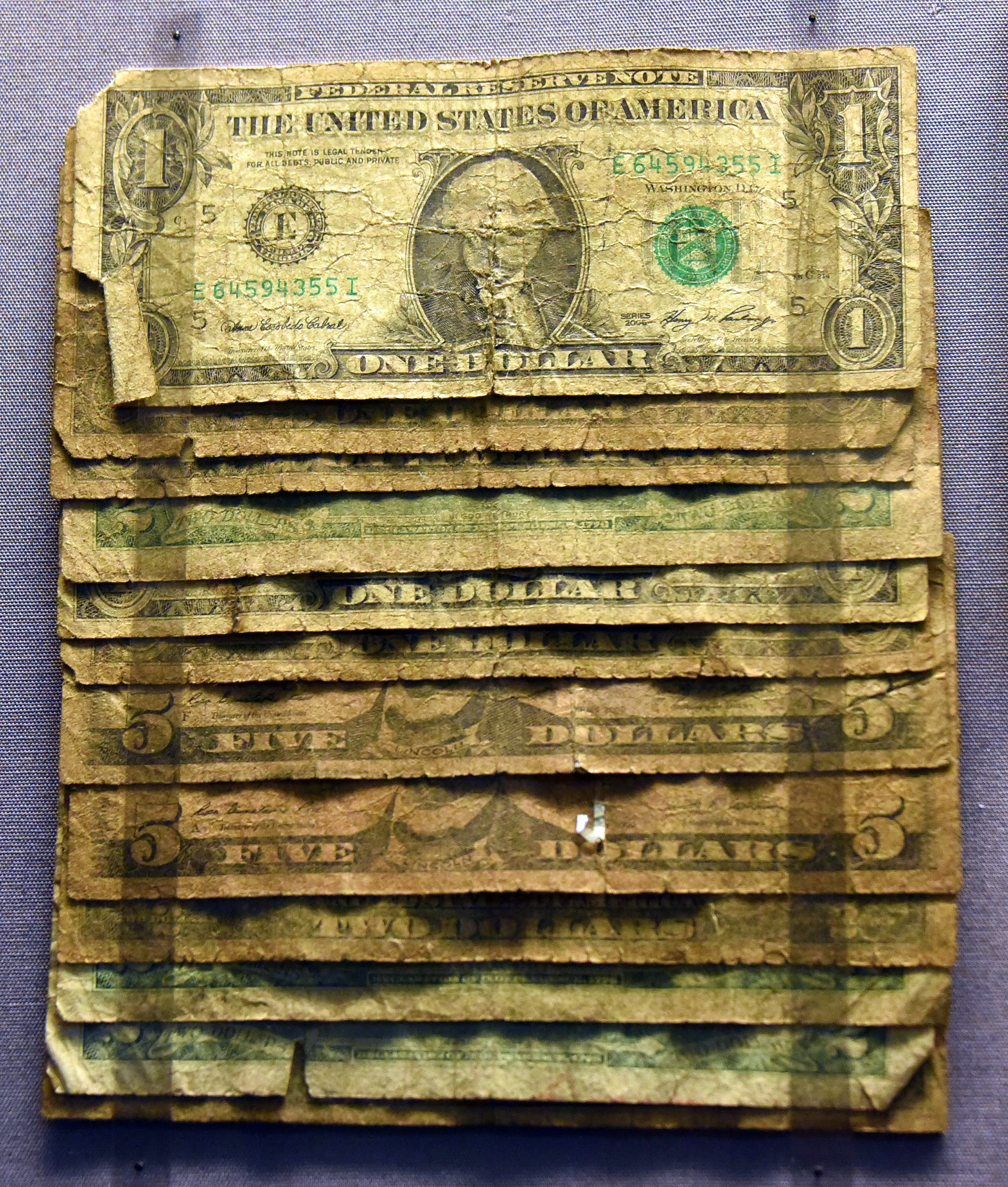
US banknotes, collected in Zimbabwe in 2015. Used as local currency. On display at the British Museum in London

In December 2008, the Reserve Bank of Zimbabwe licensed around 1,000 shops to deal in foreign currency. Citizens had increasingly been using foreign currency in daily exchanges, as local shops stated the prices of few goods in Zimbabwe dollars, because they needed foreign currency to import foreign goods. Many businesses and street vendors continued to do so without getting the license.

In January 2009, acting Finance Minister Patrick Chinamasa lifted the restriction to use only Zimbabwean dollars. This acknowledged what many were already doing. Citizens were allowed to use the US dollar, the euro, and the South African rand. However, teachers and civil servants were still being paid in Zimbabwean dollars. Even though their salaries were in the trillions per month, this amounted to around US$1, or half the daily bus fare. The government also used a restriction on bank withdrawals to try to limit the amount of money that was in circulation. It limited cash withdrawals to $Z500,000, around US$0.25.

=== The black market ===
Official, black market, and OMIR exchange rates 1 Jan 2001 to 2 Feb 2009. Note the semi-logarithmic scale.

Prices in shops and restaurants were still quoted in Zimbabwean dollars, but were adjusted several times a day. Any Zimbabwean dollars acquired needed to be exchanged for foreign currency on the parallel market immediately, or the holder would suffer a significant loss of value. For example, mini-bus drivers were required by law to only accept payment from passengers in Zimbabwean dollars, but at increasing rates throughout the day: the evening commute was therefore the highest-priced ride of the day, with the next morning's price higher still. A driver might have to exchange money three times a day, not in banks but in back office rooms and in parking lots.

Such business venues constituted a black market, an arena explicitly outside the law. Transactors could evade the price freezes and the mandate to use Zimbabwean dollars. The black market served the demand for daily goods such as soap and bread, as grocery stores operating within the law no longer sold items whose prices were strictly controlled, or charged customers more if they were paying in Zimbabwean dollars. At one point, a loaf of bread was Z$550,000,000 in the regular market, when bread was even available; apart from a trip to another country, the black market was the only option for almost all goods at up to Z$10,000,000,000 for a loaf of bread. In May 2022, it was reported that the devaluation of the Zimbabwe dollar's black market exchange rate, which is used in most financial transactions in the economy, has been driving up inflation in the country.

=== Redenomination ===
At independence in 1980, the Zimbabwean dollar became the common currency. Originally, the paper notes were in denominations of Z$2, 5, 10 and 20, and coins in denominations of 1, 5, 10, 20, 50 cents and Z$1. As larger banknotes were needed to pay for menial amounts, the Reserve Bank of Zimbabwe planned to print and circulate denominations of up to Z$10, 20, 50, and 100 trillion. Announcements of new denominations were increasingly frequent; the Z$200000000 note was announced just days after the printing of the Z$100000000 notes.

The government did not attempt to fight inflation with fiscal and monetary policy. By 2003, there were growing shortages. In 2006, before hyperinflation reached its peak, the bank announced it would print larger notes to buy foreign currencies. The Reserve Bank printed Z$21 trillion dollars to pay off debts owed to the International Monetary Fund.

On three occasions, the Reserve Bank of Zimbabwe redenominated its currency. First, in August 2006, the Reserve Bank recalled notes in exchange for new notes with three zeros slashed from the currency. In July 2008, the governor of the Reserve Bank of Zimbabwe, Gideon Gono, announced a new Zimbabwean dollar, this time with 10 zeros removed. The Z$10 billion would be redenominated to be Z$1. This move was not just to slow inflation but also to make computations more manageable.

A third redenomination, producing the "fourth Zimbabwe dollar", occurred in February 2009, and dropped 12 more zeros from the currency. It was thus worth 10 trillion trillion original dollars, as the three redenominations together reduced the value of an original dollar by 10^{3} × 10^{10} × 10^{12} = 10^{25}. Computers could not handle the amount of zeros such that other forms of money had to be used to act as normal money (bearer's cheques). Banks had to input a lesser amount on the deposit or withdrawal slip then would put a covering statement, such as "multiply by 1000000 or add 10 zeros to your amount to get the real value". The same was true for businesses as well and all traders.

== Solutions ==
A solution effectively adopted by Zimbabwe was to adopt some foreign currency as official. To facilitate commerce, it is less important which currency is adopted than that the government standardise on a single currency. The US dollar, the euro, and the South African rand were candidates; the US dollar had the most credibility and was the most widely traded within Zimbabwe. Zimbabwe could have also joined the nearby nations of Lesotho, Namibia, South Africa, and Eswatini, which constitute the Common Monetary Area, or "Rand Zone" by formally deciding to use the rand to promote trade and stability.

In 2009, the government abandoned printing Zimbabwean dollars entirely. This implicitly solved the chronic problem of lack of confidence in the Zimbabwean dollar, and compelled people to use the foreign currency of their choice. Since then Zimbabwe has used a combination of foreign currencies, mostly US dollars.

In 2014, the Reserve Bank of Zimbabwe unveiled "convertible" coins in denominations of US$0.01 through US$0.50 (Zimbabwean bond coins). The bank said that 80% of Zimbabweans use the US dollar, and said the local lack of coins induces retailers to round prices up to the next higher dollar. The coins extend the use of the dollar as a de facto currency, and indeed the National Bank repeatedly assured that it does not intend to bring back a national currency. As of May 2016, the liquidity of the USD had rapidly decreased and John Mangudya, the governor of the Reserve Bank of Zimbabwe, said Zimbabwe would print a new bond note, which he said would be at par with the American dollar. This was to be done within the following two months. Some citizens disputed this, saying the 2008 error was now returning and they would not accept the bond notes.

The July 2018 inflation rate in Zimbabwe was officially 4.3% (up from 2.9% in June). In June 2019, the official inflation rate was 97.9%. In 2022, it was reported that the inflation rate quickened to 96.4% in April, from 60.6% in January. Zimbabwe's government ordered banks to stop lending with immediate effect. This move was designed to stop speculation against the Zimbabwean dollar and was part of a raft of measures to arrest its rapid devaluation on the black market. Other measures include an increased tax on forex bank transfers, higher levies on forex cash withdrawals above $1,000, and the payment of taxes which used to be charged in forex in local currency, according to Mnangagwa.

=== Demonetization ===
In June 2015, the Reserve Bank of Zimbabwe said it would begin a process to "demonetize" (i.e., to officially value a fiat currency at zero). The plan was to have completed the switch to the US dollar by the end of September 2015. In December 2015, Patrick Chinamasa, the Zimbabwe Minister of Finance, said they would make the Chinese yuan their main reserve currency and legal tender after China cancelled US$40 million in debts. However, this was denied by the Reserve Bank of Zimbabwe in January 2016. In June 2016, nine currencies were legal tender in Zimbabwe but it was estimated 90% of transactions were in US dollars and 5% in Rand.

In April 2023, the government announced the introduction of digital currencies backed by gold reserves. The digital money will be allowed to be transferred for people and business as a form of payment via e-gold wallets or e-gold cards.

== Return of hyperinflation ==
In 2019, the new Finance Minister, Mthuli Ncube, presided over the conversion from foreign currency to a new Zimbabwean currency, and the resultant return of hyperinflation. It was estimated that inflation reached 500% during 2019. According to the website Trading Economics, the annual inflation rate in Zimbabwe was 540% in February 2020. The annual inflation rate had risen to 676% in March 2020, and there was a bleak economic outlook due to the effects of a drought in 2019 and the COVID-19 pandemic. In 2022, the country experienced another period of high inflation, which jumped to 131.7% in May from 96.4% in April. Since February 2022, Zimbabwe's inflation rate shot up from 66% to more than 130% in May 2022. By June 2022, it surged again to 191%. The same month, Finance minister Mthuli Ncube said the GVT would not hesitate to intervene to cushion against price increases and exchange rate volatility. In April 2024, a new currency was announced, the Zimbabwean ZiG.
