= De facto currency =

Concept of economics

A de facto currency is a unit of money that is not legal tender in a country but is treated as such by most of the populace. The United States dollar and the euro are the most common de facto currencies.

== Euro ==
Andorra used the euro unofficially prior to June 2013, at which point the euro became its official currency. The euro remains the de facto currency in Kosovo and Montenegro.

== United States dollar ==
Countries using the United States dollar as their de facto currency include Aruba and Cambodia, where most hotels, restaurants, and transportation are priced in dollars; Dominican Republic where it is acceptable in many places, including airports to pay temporary visa fees for non-US/Dominican visits; Iraq, where United States commercial, governmental and military involvement due to the Iraq War and the Iraqi Dinar's low value has made the US dollar highly preferred; Timor-Leste, Lebanon, El Salvador, Ecuador, and Panama; Venezuela where they accept the USD for practically everything as a substitute for the highly inflated Venezuelan bolívar. In Zimbabwe the United States Dollar is used as the accepted currency for almost everything. Wages are paid partly in USD and the other half in ZiG( a legal tender pegged to the gold). The majority of the population prefer the USD than the ZiG. The adoption of the USD was the result of the collapse of the Zimbabwean Dollar in 2008-2009. The Zimbabwean Government has tried to introduce new currencies but the USD remains the legal tender in every financial transactions from central across all sectors

== Russian ruble ==
Abkhazia, South Ossetia, and Crimea have the Russian ruble as their de facto currency.

== South African rand and Botswana pula ==
Due to hyperinflation in Zimbabwe in 2006 to 2008, the government of Zimbabwe has allowed circulation of foreign currency since September 2008 and local currency became obsolete since 12 April 2009. Both South African rand and Botswana pula circulate in Zimbabwe.

== Canadian dollar ==
The small French island of St. Pierre and Miquelon has the Canadian dollar as its de facto currency.

== Hong Kong dollar ==
The Hong Kong dollar is widely accepted in Macau, even though it has not gained official recognition from Autoridade Monetária de Macau (AMCM) as legal tender in Macau. The Macanese Pataca is pegged to the Hong Kong Dollar at 1.029(buy)/1.032(sell). However, many merchants who accept Hong Kong Dollars may offer to pay the difference between two currencies, such practice is often called '不補水' in Chinese. If merchandise priced in Patacas is paid for in Hong Kong Dollars, and if merchants practice '不補水', prices in Patacas may be rounded up to the equivalent in Hong Kong Dollars, and merchants would offer change in Hong Kong dollars or the amount of Hong Kong Dollars paid would be automatically converted into Patacas and merchants would then offer change in Patacas.
