= Mosi-oa-Tunya (disambiguation) =

Mosi-oa-Tunya usually refers to Victoria Falls, a waterfall on the Zambia–Zimbabwe border.

Mosi-oa-Tunya or Mosi oa Tunya may also refer to:

- Victoria Falls, Zimbabwe, a resort town
- Mosi-oa-Tunya (coin), a gold coin currency of Zimbabwe
- Mosi-oa-Tunya National Park, a national park in Zambia
