= Zimbabwean bond notes =

Banknote in Zimbabwe

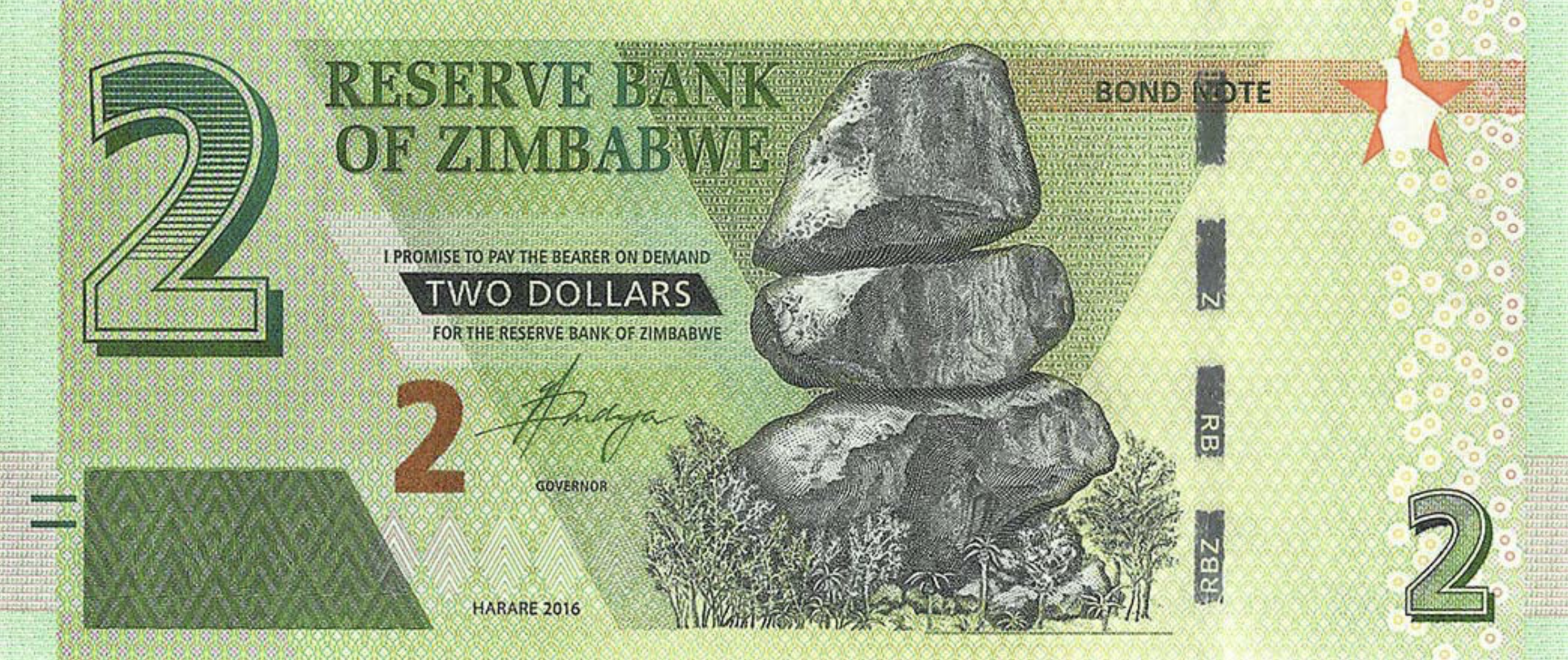
- A two-dollar bond note
- Country: Zimbabwe
- Issuers: Reserve Bank of Zimbabwe (2014–2024)
- Denominations: $2 and $5

Zimbabwean bond notes were a form of banknote in circulation in Zimbabwe. Released by the Reserve Bank of Zimbabwe, the notes were stated to not be a currency in itself but rather legal tender near money pegged equally against the U.S. dollar. In 2014, prior to the release of bond notes, a series of bond coins entered circulation.

== History ==
In November 2016, backed by a US$200 million loan from the African Export-Import Bank, the Reserve Bank of Zimbabwe began issuing $2 bond notes. Two months later, US$15 million worth of new five-dollar bond notes were also released. Further plans for $10 and $20 bond notes were ruled out by the Reserve Bank's governor John Mangudya. However, in 2020, $10 bond and $20 were introduced. In 2022, the $50 and $100 bond notes were introduced.

The notes were not generally accepted by the Zimbabwean people, so the government tried expanding the electronic money supply and issuing Treasury bills instead.

The bond notes were still in circulation in 2018, although former Finance Minister Tendai Biti said that they should be demonetised, as they were being subject to arbitrage. In the campaigning for the 2018 elections, the bond notes became a political issue, with the MDC Alliance calling for their replacement with 'real cash'.

Despite the notes being notionally pegged to the US dollar, their value, like the former Zimbabwean dollar, is collapsing, with everyday transactions using a rate of $3 bond notes to 1 United States dollar in January 2019 and over $90 bond notes to US$1 as of November 2020. As of August 2022, the conversion rate is $361.9 bond notes to US$1.

== Banknotes ==
Bond notes, 2016 (Signature: John Mangudya, Capital: Harare)
| Pick No. | Image | | Value | Dimensions | Main colour | Description | | | Date of | | |
| Pick No. | Obverse | Reverse | Value | Dimensions | Main colour | Obverse | Reverse | Watermark | printing | issue | withdrawal |
|---|---|---|---|---|---|---|---|---|---|---|---|
| 99 | | | $2 | 155 × 62 mm | Green | Domboremari with trees | Eternal Flame at the National Heroes' Acre, and the Old Parliament House | Zimbabwe Bird and "RBZ" | 2016 | 28 November 2016 | 11 November 2019 |
| 100 | | | $5 | 155 × 66 mm | Purple | Domboremari with trees | Three giraffes and the Zimbabwe Aloe (Aloe excelsa) | Zimbabwe Bird and "RBZ" | 2016 | 3 February 2017 | 11 November 2019 |
These images are to scale at 0.7 pixel per millimetre (18 pixel per inch). For table standards, see the banknote specification table.

== Bond notes and the RTGS dollar ==
In February of 2019, the RBZ Governor announced that the bond notes would be part of the "values" that make up the new currency to be added into the Zimbabwean market, the RTGS dollar along with the bond coins and electronic balances.

== See also ==
- Zimbabwean bond coins
- Zimbabwean bonds
- Zimbabwean dollar (1980–2009)
- Zimbabwean dollar (2019–2024)

| Preceded by: Multi-currency system Reason: shortage of hard currency Ratio: at par with the US dollar | Currency of Zimbabwe; 2014 – 2019; Note: Part of a multi-currency system, along with bond coins | Succeeded by: Fifth Zimbabwean dollar Reason: attempted dedollarisation Ratio: at par |
