= Zimbabwean bond coins =

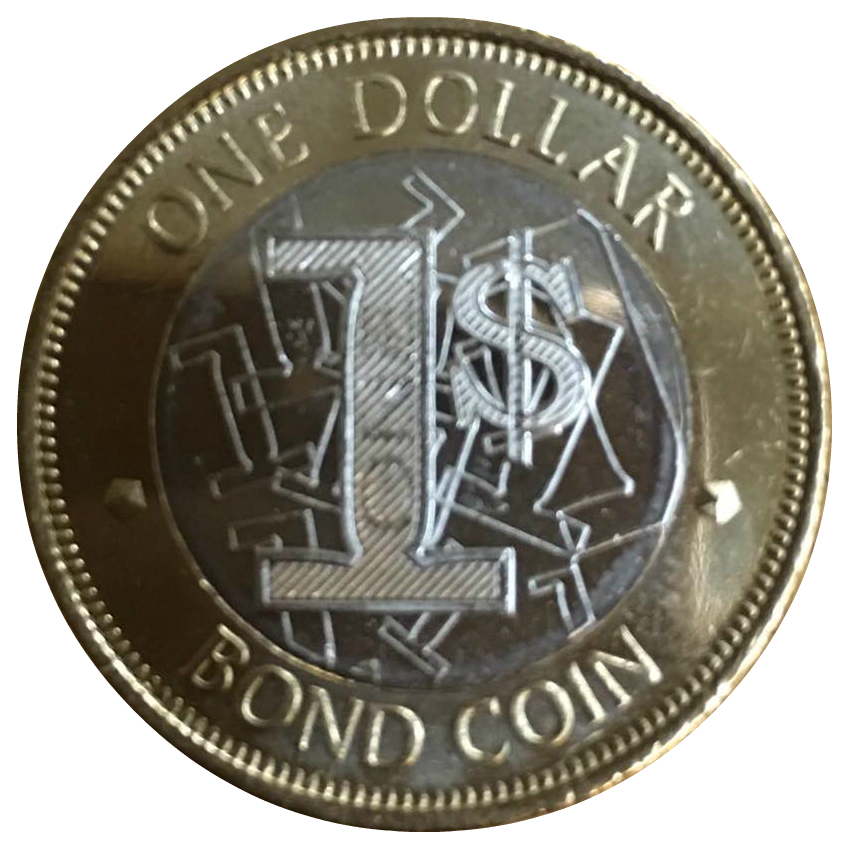
- Country: Zimbabwe
- Issuers: Reserve Bank of Zimbabwe (2014–2024)
- Denominations: 1, 5, 10, 25, 50 Cents Bond Coin, 1 Dollar Bond Coin, 2 Dollar Bond Coin

The Reserve Bank of Zimbabwe began to release Zimbabwean bond coins on 18 December 2014. The coins were supported by a US$50 million facility extended to the Reserve Bank of Zimbabwe by Afreximbank (the African Export–Import Bank). To date coins worth US$15 million have been struck out of the total $50 million available. The coins were first issued in denominations of 1, 5, 10, and 25 cents and are pegged to the corresponding values in U.S. dollars. A 50 cents bond coin was released in March 2015.

The coins were issued to remedy a lack of small change resulting from the absence of a solid seigniorage contract with the U.S., South Africa or any of several other countries whose currencies, including the U.S. dollar and the euro, are being used in the multi-currency system that arose in 2009, when Zimbabwe abandoned the Zimbabwean dollar in response to several cycles of hyperinflation. The Zimbabwean economy being too frail and small to pay the interest which would come with a seigniorage contract, the country chose instead to implement a multi-currency environment based on the U.S. dollar. However, this arrangement has meant a shortage of small change in coins.

Public reaction to the bond coins has been extremely skeptical, with widespread fear that they are the government's first step to reintroducing the distrusted Zimbabwean dollar. John Mangudya, the Governor of the Reserve Bank of Zimbabwe, had denied that the Zimbabwean dollar was being reintroduced.

The bond coins, struck at the South African Mint in Pretoria, were the first Zimbabwean coins since 2003.

A bimetallic one-dollar bond coin was released on 28 November 2016 along with two- and five-dollar Zimbabwean bond notes. A bimetallic two-dollar bond coin was released in 2019, and circulates with its equivalent banknote in circulation.

== Coins in Circulation ==
Denomination	Year	Obverse	Reverse	Weight	Diameter	Material	Ref.
1 Cent Bond Coin	2014	RBZ in various positions with coin date centered	Enclosed in circle with "1" surrounded by "ONE CENT BOND COIN"	2.45 g	17 mm	Copper-plated steel	
5 Cents Bond Coin	2014	RBZ in various positions with coin date centered	Enclosed in circle with "5" surrounded by "FIVE CENTS BOND COIN"	2.85 g	18 mm	Brass-plated steel	
10 Cents Bond Coin	2014	RBZ in various positions with coin date centered	Enclosed in circle with "10" surrounded by "TEN CENTS BOND COIN"	3.80 g	20 mm	Brass-plated steel	
25 Cents Bond Coin	2014	RBZ in various positions with coin date centered	Enclosed in circle with "25" surrounded by "TWENTY-FIVE CENTS BOND COIN"	4.80 g	23 mm	Nickel-plated steel	
50 Cents Bond Coin	2014	RBZ in various positions with coin date centered	Enclosed in circle with "50" surrounded by "FIFTY CENTS BOND COIN"	6.00 g	25 mm	Nickel-plated steel	
1 Dollar Bond Coin	2016	RBZ in various positions with coin date centered	Enclosed in circle with "1$" surrounded by "ONE DOLLAR BOND COIN"	9.06 g	28 mm	Brass ring with a nickel-plated steel center plug	
2 Dollars Bond Coin	2018	RBZ in various positions with coin date centered	Enclosed in circle with "2$" surrounded by "TWO DOLLAR BOND COIN"	11.11 g	28 mm	Cupronickel ring with an Aluminum-bronze center plug	

== Bond coins and the RTGS dollar ==
In February 2019, the RBZ Governor, announced that the bond coins would be part of the "values" that make up the new currency to be added into the Zimbabwean market, the Real Time Gross Settlement (RTGS) dollar.

== See also ==
- Zimbabwean bond notes
- Zimbabwean bonds
- Zimbabwean dollar (1980–2009)
- Zimbabwean dollar (2019–2024)

Preceded by: Multi-currency system Reason: shortage of hard currency Ratio: at par with the US dollar	Currency of Zimbabwe; 2014 – 2019; Note: Part of a multi-currency system, along with bond notes from 2016 to 2019	Succeeded by: Fifth Zimbabwean dollar Reason: attempted dedollarisation Ratio: at par
