= South African Mint =

Mint

Coordinates: 25.9145°S 28.1568°E

- Industry: Coin production
- Founded: 1890 (First national mint); 1923 (as a branch of the Royal Mint); 1941 (as an independent mint)
- Headquarters: Centurion, Gauteng, South Africa
- Area served: South Africa
- Key people: Honey Mamabolo (Managing Director)
- Products: Coins
- Owner: South African Reserve Bank
- Website: www.samint.co.za

The South African Mint is responsible for minting all coins of the South African rand on behalf of its owner, the South African Reserve Bank. Located in Centurion, Gauteng near South Africa's administrative capital Pretoria, the mint manufactures coins and planchets for both domestic and international markets.

== History ==
Following the discovery of gold in the South African Republic (causing the 1886 Witwatersrand Gold Rush), the country's President Paul Kruger decided to establish a national mint. This was established in 1890 and opened on 6 July 1892 in Pretoria. After the end of the Second Boer War in 1902, the country was annexed into the British Empire and became the Transvaal Colony, leading to the closure of the mint after the pound sterling became the legal tender of the new colony. Under the Mint Act of 1919, the British established a branch of the Royal Mint on 1 January 1923, which produced £83,114,575 worth of sovereigns during its lifetime. As South Africa began cutting ties with Britain, the mint closed on 30 June 1941 only to be later reopened as the South African Mint.

== Products ==
Most of the production is of circulation coins and commemorative coins. Among them are:

- Coins of the South African rand
- Bronze plated steel
- Nickel-plated bronze
- Sterling silver (925Ag), e.g. EWT Medallions / Sterling Silver Crown
- 22 ct Gold
- 24 ct Gold (999.9Au)
- Zimbabwean Bond Coins - 2014, 2016, 2017, and 2018.
- South Sudanese pound coins denominated in 10, 20 and 50 Piasters, 1 Pound and 2 Pounds - 2015 only.
- Zambian kwacha coins denominated in 5,10,50 Ngwee and 1 Kwacha

== See also ==
- Bullion
- Bullion coin
- Economy of South Africa
- Gold as an investment
- Inflation hedge
- Platinum as an investment
- Silver as an investment
