= Zimbabwe Gold =

Currency of Zimbabwe

ZWG
- ZiG coins

ISO 4217
- Code: ZWG (numeric: 924)
- Subunit: 0.01

Units of account
- Plural: ZiG
- Symbol: ZiG
- Subunit
- 1/100: cent notionally only; cents are not used in any denomination

Denominations
- Banknotes
- Freq. used: ZWG10, ZWG20, ZWG50
- Rarely used: ZWG100, ZWG200 (not issued yet)
- Coins
- Freq. used: ZiG1, ZiG2, ZiG5
- Rarely used: ZWG1/10, ZiG1/4, ZiG1/2 (not issued yet)

Demographics
- Date of introduction: 8 April 2024; 2 years ago
- Replaced: Zimbabwean dollar
- User(s): Zimbabwe

Issuance
- Central bank: Reserve Bank of Zimbabwe
- Website: www.rbz.co.zw

The Zimbabwe Gold (ZiG; code: ZWG) is the official currency of Zimbabwe since 8 April 2024, backed by US$1.6 billion worth of hard assets: foreign currencies, gold, and other precious metals. It replaced the 2019–2024 Zimbabwean dollar, which had suffered from rapid depreciation, with the official exchange rate surpassing 30,000 Zimbabwean dollars per US dollar on 5 April 2024, whilst the parallel market rate reached 40,000 per US dollar. Prior to the introduction of the ZiG, annual inflation in Zimbabwe hit 55.3% in March 2024.

Though, in the first six months after its introduction the ZiG lost half of its value, later the exchange rate of the ZiG stabilized and since November 2024 the rate has been around 25 to 27 ZiG per US Dollar.

The ZiG is notionally divided into 100 cents, which were first used by the Zimbabwe Stock Exchange before the currency had an ISO code. Cents were officially recognised by the Reserve Bank of Zimbabwe when a currency code for the Zimbabwe Gold was introduced in June 2024. However, the smallest coin is 1 ZiG.

== Background ==
The ZiG currency was announced on 5 April 2024, taking the name from ZiG digital tokens, which are now available as GBDT. The ZiG is Zimbabwe's sixth attempt since 2008 at creating a new currency that will make it independent of the US dollar.

Since the currency crisis of 2008–2009, Zimbabwe has a multi-currency system. It was introduced in 2009 after the hyperinflation of the fourth Zimbabwean dollar (ZWL). For ten years there was no Zimbabwean currency. However, in February 2019 the government introduced the Zimdollar (ZWL) on par with the US dollar, but it was quickly devalued to $2.50 Zimdollars per US-dollar. Briefly, from June 2019 to March 2020, the government required all transactions to be done in Zimdollars, but that quickly proved impractical. Legal use of foreign currencies was restored and they remain legal tender.

By April 2024, the value of the Zimdollar (the RTGS Dollar) had decreased so much that the exchange rate was $30,000 Zimdollars per US dollar officially, and even more on the black market. At that time, US dollars accounted for four-fifths of all transactions.

== History ==
In discussions the government of Zimbabwe decided to issue a new currency backed by gold reserves, the ZiG.

Originally established at 2.50 ZiG to one USD, the ZiG began trading on 8 April 2024 at an exchange rate of 13.56 ZiG to one USD. Since its launch, the proportion of transactions conducted in USD has declined from 85% to 70%. The government and the central bank expect the use of ZiG to increase in the country gradually. As an incentive, companies are required to pay fifty-percent of their quarterly taxes in ZiG. However, market forces have caused even the government to fail to switch to the new currency. Gift Mugano, a visiting professor of economics at the University of Zimbabwe Business School, said, "The government is [still] refusing its own money to pay for passports, fuel and other services."

By October 2024, after the first six months of trading, the ZiG had officially lost half its value (27 ZiG to 1 USD), and experienced a seventy-five per cent loss on the unregulated market (50 ZiG to 1 USD). In response, in late September the Monetary Policy Committee (MPC) of the Reserve Bank of Zimbabwe tightened monetary policies with the aim of temporarily halting further depreciation. However, over the next six months the value of the ZiG continued to drop on the unregulated market, so that by the end of February 2025 it was valued at only 5% of its original value. This was despite the fact that the price of gold rose by 24% since the gold-backed ZiG was issued in April 2024, and the Reserve Bank of Zimbabwe's assertion that over US$400 million was spent supporting the currency over that same period.

However, since the central bank tightened monetary policy in October 2024, the monthly inflation rate in Zimbabwe, both in terms of the US dollar and the ZiG, in February 2025 had dropped to 0.5% for ZiG and 0.2% for US dollars.

== Coins and banknotes ==
The Reserve Bank of Zimbabwe, over the weekend of 6 to 7 April 2024, released the currency features.

=== Coins ===
The coins came in several forms: 1 ZiG, 2 ZiG, 5 ZiG. They were introduced on 30 April 2024, along with the banknotes.

There are also plans to introduce coins for 1/10 ZiG, 1/4 ZiG, and 1/2 ZiG as well. However, as of 2026, these coins have not been issued.

Banknotes of the same denominations were not released.

=== Banknotes ===
==== 2024 series ====
The Reserve Bank unveiled banknotes of the ZiG (Zimbabwean Gold) on 5 April 2024, which originally consisted of eight denominations from 1 ZiG to 200 ZiG. However, only the 10 and 20 ZiG notes entered circulation: The 1, 2 and 5 ZiG notes were cancelled and issued as coins instead, while the release of the 50, 100 and 200 ZiG notes were postponed (then never released) on 30 May 2024, due to concerns by the Reserve Bank that their release would "fuel inflation".

The ZiG banknotes are almost identical in design, different only by value and colour: the front features the Domboremari and a QR code, while the reverse features liquid gold being moulded on top of a stack of 12 gold bars. Scanning the QR code returns a plain text string "Reserve Bank of Zimbabwe ZiG# Harare 2024", where # is the denomination.

2024 series (Signature: John Mushayavanhu; Capital: Harare)
Value	Dimensions	Main colour	Description			Date of	
Value	Dimensions	Main colour	Obverse	Reverse	Watermark	printing	issue
1 ZiG	155 × 65 mm	Blue	Domboremari with trees	Liquid gold being moulded on top of a stack of 12 gold bars	Zimbabwe Bird and "RBZ"	2024	Never issued
2 ZiG	155 × 65 mm	Green	Domboremari with trees	Liquid gold being moulded on top of a stack of 12 gold bars	Zimbabwe Bird and "RBZ"	2024	Never issued
5 ZiG	155 × 65 mm	Pink	Domboremari with trees	Liquid gold being moulded on top of a stack of 12 gold bars	Zimbabwe Bird and "RBZ"	2024	Never issued
10 ZiG	155 × 65 mm	Navy blue	Domboremari with trees	Liquid gold being moulded on top of a stack of 12 gold bars	Zimbabwe Bird and "RBZ"	2024	30 April 2024
20 ZiG	155 × 65 mm	Peach and green	Domboremari with trees	Liquid gold being moulded on top of a stack of 12 gold bars	Zimbabwe Bird and "RBZ"	2024	13 May 2024
50 ZiG	155 × 65 mm	Brown	Domboremari with trees	Liquid gold being moulded on top of a stack of 12 gold bars	Zimbabwe Bird and "RBZ"	2024	Never issued
100 ZiG	155 × 65 mm	Olive green	Domboremari with trees	Liquid gold being moulded on top of a stack of 12 gold bars	Zimbabwe Bird and "RBZ"	2024	Never issued
200 ZiG	155 × 65 mm	Red	Domboremari with trees	Liquid gold being moulded on top of a stack of 12 gold bars	Zimbabwe Bird and "RBZ"	2024	Never issued
For table standards, see the banknote specification table.

==== 2026 series ====
On 27 February 2026, the Reserve Bank unveiled the second series of ZiG banknotes, also known as the "BiG5" series: consisting of five denominations, the first three (10, 20 and 50 ZiG) entered circulation on 7 April 2026, and the remainder (100 and 200 ZiG) will follow later. The front of the notes features the Domboremari and one of the Big Five game animals, hence the "BiG5" name: the reverse features various landmarks.

2026 series (Signature: John Mushayavanhu; Capital: Harare)
Value	Dimensions	Main colour	Description			Date of	
Value	Dimensions	Main colour	Obverse	Reverse	Watermark	printing	issue
10 ZiG	130 × 65 mm	Red	Cape buffalo, Domboremari with trees	Balancing rocks at Matobo Hills	Zimbabwe Bird and "10"	2026	7 April 2026
20 ZiG	137 × 65 mm	Brown	African elephant, Domboremari with trees	New Parliament Building	Zimbabwe Bird and "20"	2026	7 April 2026
50 ZiG	144 × 65 mm	Green	Rhinoceros, Domboremari with trees	Kariba Dam	Zimbabwe Bird and "50"	2026	7 April 2026
100 ZiG	151 × 65 mm	Purple	Leopard, Domboremari with trees	Victoria Falls	Zimbabwe Bird and "100"	2026	Not yet issued
200 ZiG	158 × 65 mm	Blue	Lion, Domboremari with trees	Great Zimbabwe ruins	Zimbabwe Bird and "200"	2026	Not yet issued
For table standards, see the banknote specification table.

== Conversions ==
=== Exchange rates ===
The Zimbabwean dollar (ZWL) lost about 32% value on interbank in two-day trading, moving from 22,950 to 33,903 per US dollar. The conversion to ZiG was based on gold price and swap rate. On a press release dated 6 April 2024, the Reserve Bank of Zimbabwe announced that ZWL would be converted to ZiG at an exchange rate of 2498.7242 ZWL for one ZiG. Zimbabweans were given 21 days to convert their cash into ZiG.

The ZiG started trading on 8 April 2024 with an exchange rate of 13.56 ZiG per US dollar and was subsequently allowed to freely float.

As a result of inflation, on 27 September 2024, the RBZ devalued the ZiG (ZWG) by 42.55% against the US dollar (1 USD = 26.36 ZiG (ZWG)). In the month of September 2024, consumer prices rose by 37.2% in ZiG terms, compared to just 0.7% in USD terms during the same period. This was compared to a 5.8% rise in ZiG prices over the course of the month before (August).

=== Zimswitch and banks ===
All banks and financial institutions were instructed to convert all ZWL balances, obligations, and accounts to the new currency, ZiG.

== See also ==
- Mosi-oa-Tunya, Zimbabwean bullion coin

Preceded by: Fifth Zimbabwean dollar Reason: inflation Ratio: 1 ZiG = $2,498.7242	Currency of Zimbabwe; 2024 – Note: Part of a multi-currency system	Succeeded by: Current
