= Zimbabwean dollar (1980–2009) =

Currency of Zimbabwe from 1980 to 2009

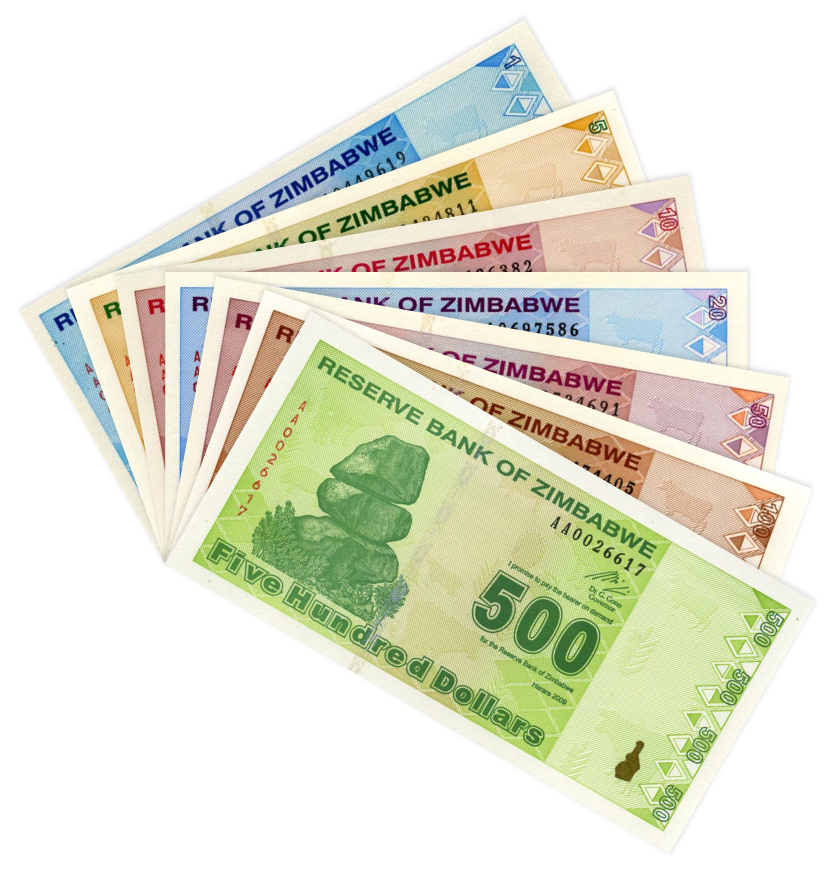
- Banknotes of the fourth dollar (2009)

ISO 4217
- Code: ZWL (Note: Previously: ZWD (1980–2006), ZWN (2006–2008) and ZWR (2008–2009). For the fifth Zimbabwean dollar, which reuses the ZWL code see Zimbabwean dollar (2019–2024).)
- Subunit: 0.01

Unit
- Symbol: $

Denominations
- Subunit
- 1/100: cent
- Banknotes: 1st dollar: $2 to $1,000 (banknotes), and $5,000 to $100,000 (bearer cheques); 2nd dollar: 1¢ to $500 million (bearer cheques), and $5 billion to $100 billion in (agro-cheques); 3rd dollar: $1 to $100 trillion; 4th dollar: $1, $5, $10, $20, $50, $100, $500
- Coins: 1, 5, 10, 25, 50 cents, 1, 2 dollars (bond coins)

Demographics
- User(s): None (previously Zimbabwe) (Note: After the Zimbabwean dollar was suspended indefinitely from 12 April 2009, euro, United States dollar, Pound sterling, South African rand, Botswana pula, Australian dollar, Chinese yuan, Indian rupee, and Japanese yen are used as legal tender. The United States dollar has been adopted as the official currency for all government transactions.)

Issuance
- Central bank: Reserve Bank of Zimbabwe

Valuation
- Inflation: 98.0% per day in mid-November 2008 or 8.97×10^{22}% per year. The currency lost half its value every 24 hours and 42 minutes.
- This infobox shows the latest status before this currency was rendered obsolete.

The Zimbabwean dollar (sign: $, or Z$ to distinguish it from other dollar-denominated currencies) was the name of four official currencies of Zimbabwe from 1980 to 12 April 2009. During this time, it was subject to periods of extreme inflation, followed by a period of hyperinflation.

The Zimbabwean dollar was introduced in 1980 to directly replace the Rhodesian dollar (which had been introduced in 1970) at par (1:1), at a similar value to the US dollar. In the 20th century the dollar functioned as a normal currency, but in the early 21st century hyperinflation in Zimbabwe reduced the Zimbabwean dollar to one of the lowest valued currency units in the world. It was redenominated three times (in 2006, 2008 and 2009), with denominations up to a $100 trillion banknote issued. The final redenomination produced the "fourth dollar" (ZWL), which was worth 10^{25} ZWD (first dollars).

Use of the Zimbabwean dollar as an official currency was effectively abandoned on 12 April 2009. It was demonetised in 2015, with outstanding accounts able to be reimbursed until 30 April 2016. In place of the Zimbabwean dollar, currencies including the South African rand, Botswana pula, pound sterling, Indian rupee, euro, Japanese yen, Australian dollar, Chinese yuan, and the United States dollar were used.

On 24 June 2019, the Reserve Bank of Zimbabwe abolished the multiple-currency system and replaced it with a new Zimbabwe dollar (the RTGS Dollar), which was the only official currency in the country between June 2019 and March 2020, after which multiple foreign currencies were allowed again. On 5 April 2024, the dollar was removed and replaced with what the authorities called "a structured currency backed by gold", named Zimbabwean gold or the ZiG.

== Origin ==
The Zimbabwean dollar's predecessor, the Rhodesian dollar, was essentially equal to half of the value of the pound sterling at the time of its adoption (during the decimalisation of 1970). A similar practice was used in other Commonwealth countries such as South Africa, Australia, and New Zealand. The selection of the name was motivated by the fact that the reduced value of the new unit correlated more closely to the value of the US dollar than to the pound sterling.

=== Design ===
The main illustration on the obverse of all of the banknotes was the Chiremba Balancing Rocks in Epworth, Harare, which were used as a metaphor demonstrating the importance of balancing development and the preservation of the fragile environment. The reverse side of dollar notes often illustrated the culture or landmarks of Zimbabwe.

== History ==
=== Initial introduction (ZWD) ===
Date of redenomination	Currency code	Value
1 August 2006	ZWN	1 000 ZWD
1 August 2008	ZWR	10^{10} ZWN = 10^{13} ZWD
2 February 2009	ZWL	10^{12} ZWR = 10^{22} ZWN = 10^{25} ZWD

With the nation's independence, the first Zimbabwean dollar was introduced in 1980 and replaced the Rhodesian dollar at par. The initial ISO 4217 code was ZWD. At the time of its introduction, the Zimbabwean dollar was nominally worth more than the US dollar in the official exchange market, with 1 ZWD = US$1.47, although this did not reflect the actual purchasing power it held.

The value of the dollar began to erode significantly from August 1991 onward: originally, this was because of the Economic Structural Adjustment Programme (ESAP), a programme of economic liberalisation that dismantled a planned "siege" economy from the UDI era. However, the ESAP caused widespread poverty and unemployment, since many of the lost jobs depended on formerly-subsidised exports with reduced global demand. The widespread poverty and unemployment, combined with impromptu spending to support veterans of the Rhodesian Bush War, resulted in a major currency crash on 14 November 1997.

The currency's official and parallel rates continued to plummet in the context in falling incomes from exports, the chaotic redistribution of land to inexperienced farmers, and Zimbabwe's involvement in the Second Congo War. By July 2006, the parallel market value of the Zimbabwean dollar fell to one millionth of a pound sterling (£1 = Z$1,000,000).

=== First re-denomination (ZWN) ===
In October 2005, the Governor of the Reserve Bank of Zimbabwe at the time, Dr. Gideon Gono, announced that Zimbabwe would have a new currency the following year, and new banknotes and coins would be produced. However, in June 2006, it was decreed that, for a new currency to be viable, Zimbabwe had to first achieve macro-economic stability. Instead, in August 2006, the first dollar was redenominated to the second dollar at the rate of 1000 first dollars to 1 second dollar (1000:1). At the same time, the currency was devalued against the US dollar, from 101000 first dollars (101 once revalued) to 250 second dollars, a decrease of about 60% (see exchange rate history table below). ISO originally assigned a new currency code of ZWN to this redenominated currency, but the Reserve Bank of Zimbabwe could not deal with a currency change, so the currency code remained 'ZWD'. The revaluation campaign, which Gideon Gono named "Operation Sunrise", was completed on 21 August 2006. It was estimated that some ten trillion old Zimbabwe dollars (22% of the money supply) were not redeemed during this period.

The following year, on 2 February 2007, the RBZ revealed that a new (third) dollar would be released. However, with inflation still exceeding 1000%, the banknotes were kept in storage. During the same month, the Reserve Bank of Zimbabwe declared inflation illegal, outlawing any raise in prices on certain commodities between 1 March and 30 June 2007. Officials arrested executives of some Zimbabwean companies for increasing prices on their products, and economists reported that "chaos had started to reign and people in the public sector became frantic". On 6 September 2007, the Zimbabwe dollar was devalued again by 92%, creating an official exchange rate of ZW$30000 to US$1, although the black market exchange rate was estimated to be ZW$600000 to US$1.

As an official exchange rate became more unreliable, the WM/Reuters company introduced a notional exchange rate (ISO ZWN) which was based on Purchasing Power Parity utilising the dual listing of companies on the Harare (ZH) and London Stock exchanges (LN).

=== Second re-denomination (ZWR) ===
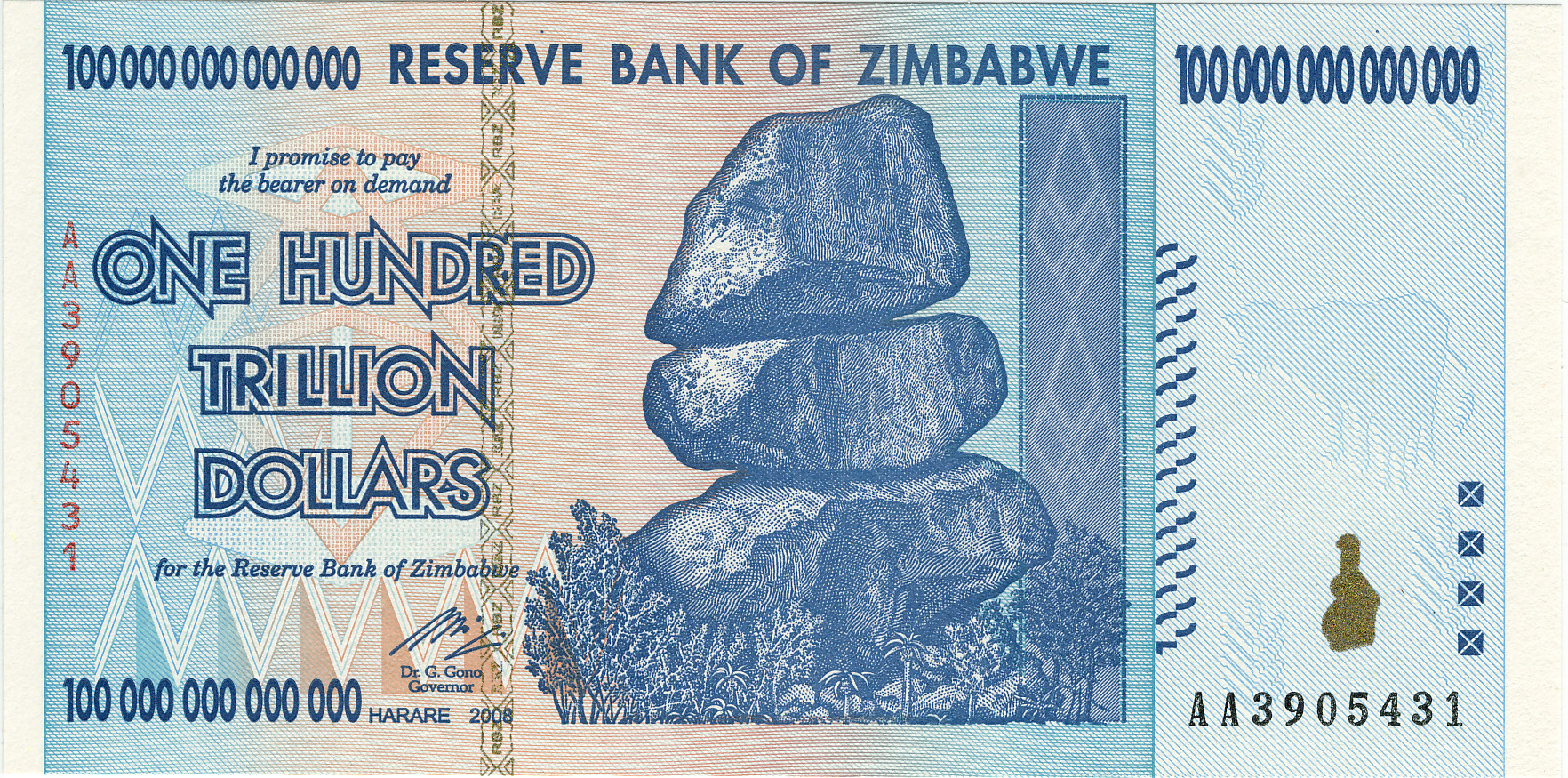
The 100 trillion Zimbabwean dollar banknote (10^{14} dollars), equal to 10^{27} pre-2006 dollars

On 30 July 2008, the dollar was redenominated and given a new currency code of ZWR. After 1 August 2008, 10 billion ZWN were worth 1 ZWR. Coins valued at Z$5, Z$10 and Z$25 and banknotes worth Z$5, Z$10, Z$20, Z$100, and Z$500 were issued in ZWR. Due to frequent cash shortages and the apparently worthless Zimbabwean dollar, foreign currency was effectively legalised as a de facto currency on 13 September 2008 via a special program. This program officially allowed a number of retailers to accept foreign money. This reflected the reality of the dollarisation of the economy, with many shop keepers refusing to accept Zimbabwe dollars and requesting US dollars or South African rand instead. Despite redenomination, the RBZ was forced to print banknotes of ever higher values to keep up with surging inflation, with ten zeros reappearing by the end of 2008. While worthless at the time, these 100 trillion dollar notes subsequently became popular with collectors.

=== Third re-denomination (ZWL) ===
On 2 February 2009, the RBZ announced that a further 12 zeros were to be taken off the currency, with 1,000,000,000,000 third Zimbabwean dollars being exchanged for 1 new fourth dollar. New banknotes were introduced with face values of Z$1, Z$5, Z$10, Z$20, Z$50, Z$100 and Z$500. The banknotes of the fourth dollar circulated alongside the third dollar, which remained legal tender until 30 June 2009. The new ISO currency code was ZWL.

Despite the introduction of the fourth dollar, however, the problems were not eliminated, and the economy continued to be almost completely dollarised. In his first budget, the Zimbabwe finance minister, Tendai Biti, stated "the death of the Zimbabwe dollar is a reality we have to live with. Since October 2008 our national currency has become moribund". In late January 2009, acting Finance Minister Patrick Chinamasa announced that all Zimbabweans would be allowed to conduct business with any currency, as a response to the hyperinflation crisis. On 12 April 2009, media outlets reported that economic planning minister Elton Mangoma had announced the suspension of the local currency "for at least a year", effectively terminating the fourth dollar.

== Withdrawal ==
=== Hyperinflation ===
All four issues of the Zimbabwean dollar experienced high rates of inflation, although it was not until the early 2000s that Zimbabwe started to experience completely unsustainable hyperinflation.

On 13 July 2007, the Zimbabwean government said that it had temporarily stopped publishing (official) inflation figures, a move that observers said was meant to draw attention away from "runaway inflation which has come to symbolise the country's unprecedented economic meltdown". In 2008, the inflation rate accelerated dramatically, from a rate in January of over 100,000% to an estimated rate of over 1,000,000% by May, and nearly 250,000,000% in July.

=== Money supply (2006–2008) ===
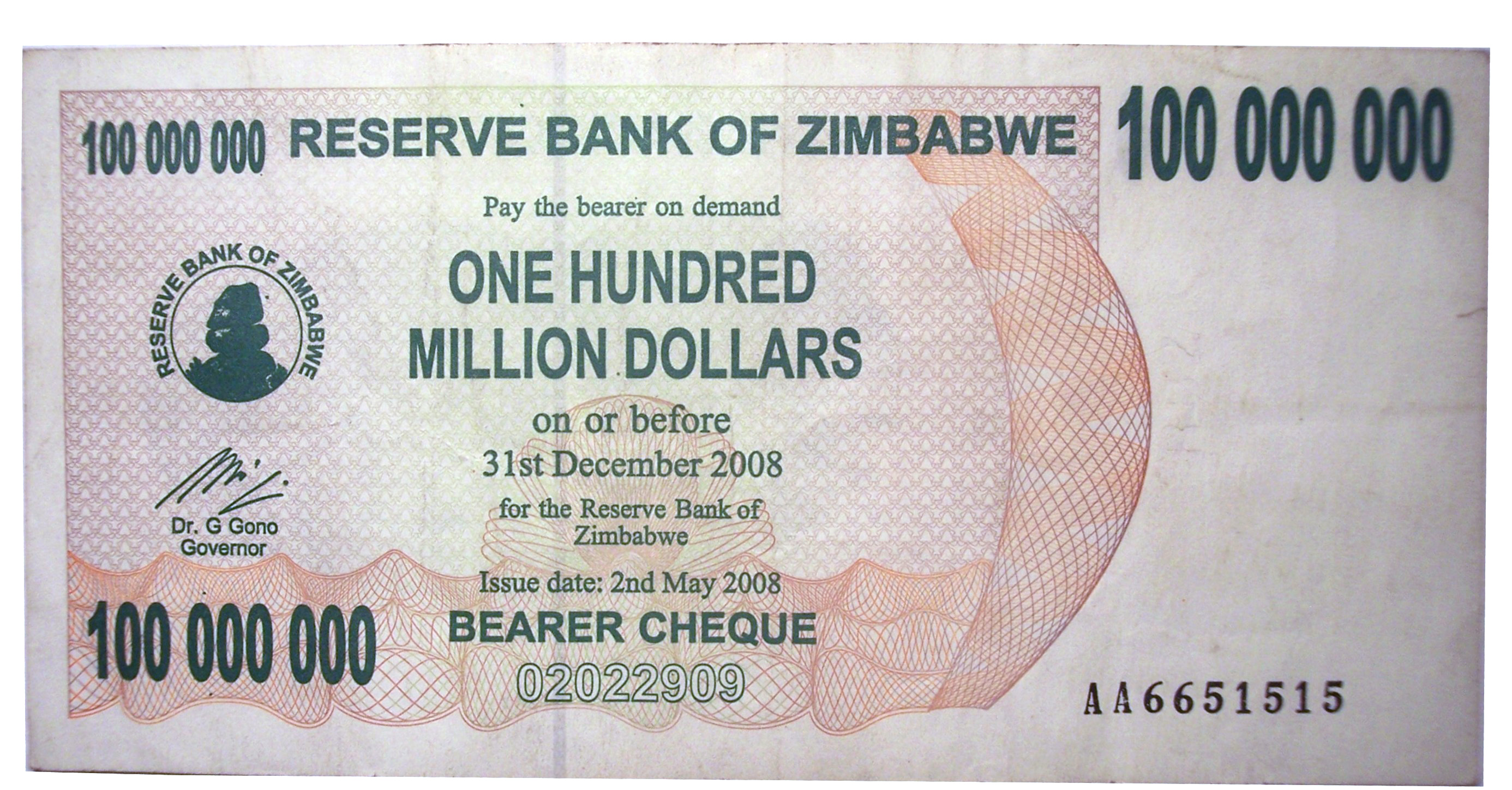
A Series 2008 bearer cheque for 100 million Zimbabwean dollars

The Reserve Bank of Zimbabwe responded to the dwindling value of the dollar by repeatedly arranging the printing of further banknotes, often at great expense from overseas suppliers.

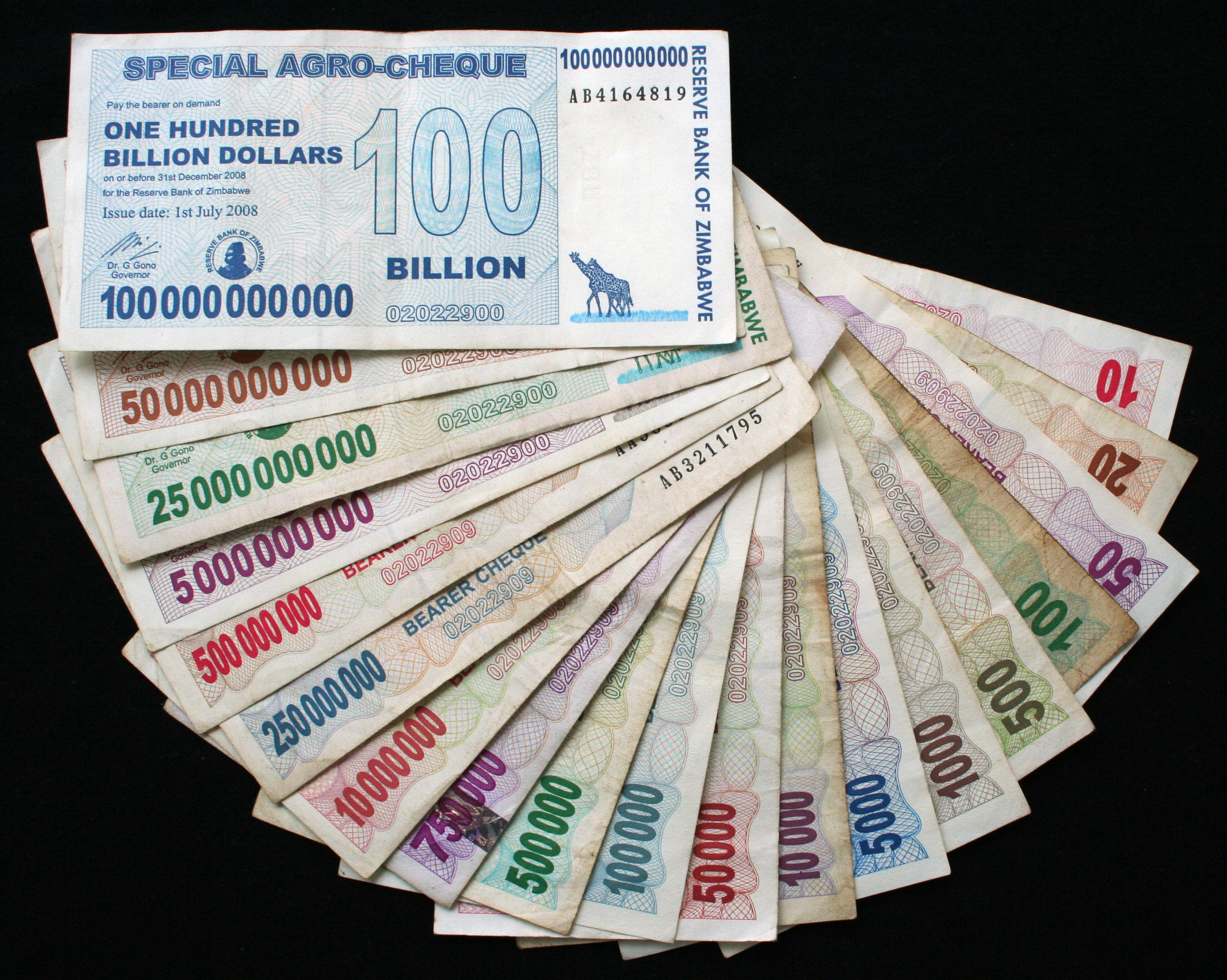
A selection of Reserve Bank of Zimbabwe bearer cheques printed between July 2007 to July 2008 (now expired) ranging between 10 and 100,000,000,000 Z$ that illustrate the hyperinflation rate in Zimbabwe.

On 1 March 2008 The Sunday Times reported that it had obtained documents showing that the Munich company Giesecke & Devrient (G&D) was receiving more than €500,000 (£381,562) a week for delivering bank notes to the value of Z$170 trillion a week. By late 2008, inflation had risen so high that automated teller machines for one major bank gave a "data overflow error" and stopped customers' attempts to withdraw money with so many zeros.

In June 2008, U.S. officials announced they would not take any action against G&D. It was reported that on 1 July 2008 the company's management board decided to cease delivering banknote paper to the Reserve Bank of Zimbabwe with immediate effect. The decision was in response to an "official request" from the German government and calls for international sanctions by the European Union and the United Nations.

=== Abandonment and demonetisation ===
The use of foreign currencies was legalised in January 2009, causing general consumer prices to stabilise again after years of hyperinflation and price speculation. The move led to a sharp drop in the usage of the Zimbabwean dollar, as hyperinflation rendered even the highest denominations worthless. The Zimbabwean dollar was effectively abandoned as an official currency on 12 April 2009, when the Economic Planning Minister Elton Mangoma confirmed the suspension of the national currency for at least a year.

On 29 January 2014, the Zimbabwe central bank announced that the US dollar, South African rand, Botswana pula, pound sterling, Euro, Australian dollar, Chinese yuan (renminbi), Indian rupee, and Japanese yen would all be accepted as legal currency within the country.

In June 2015, the Reserve Bank of Zimbabwe began to formally demonetise the Zimbabwean dollar, reducing its value steadily to zero in order to complete a switch to the US dollar by the end of September 2015. The Zimbabwean government stated that it would credit 5 US dollars to domestic bank accounts with balances of up to 175 quadrillion Zimbabwean dollars, and that it would exchange Zimbabwean dollars for US dollars at a rate of US$1 to 35 quadrillion Zimbabwean dollars to accounts with balances above 175 quadrillion Zimbabwean dollars. This move was meant to stabilise the economy and establish a credible nominal anchor under low inflation conditions. The exercise brought closure to the outstanding issue on the Zimbabwe dollar, further confirming the government's position that the local unit will not return anytime soon. The Government has maintained that the return of the Zimbabwe dollar will only be considered when key economic fundamentals, such as productivity in key sectors, have been achieved.

Similar to the Iraqi dinar scam, some promoters have reportedly claimed that a future "revalue" (RV) event will cause Zimbabwe dollar notes to regain some nonzero fraction of their original value.

== Coins ==
In 1980, coins were introduced in denominations of 1, 5, 10, 20, 50 cents, and 1 dollar. The one-cent coin was struck in bronze, with the others struck in cupro-nickel. In 1989, bronze-plated steel replaced bronze. A 2-dollar coin was introduced in 1997. In 2001, nickel-plated steel replaced cupro-nickel in the 10, 20, and 50 cents and 1 dollar coins, and a bimetallic 5-dollar coin was introduced. The Reserve Bank of Zimbabwe announced plans for new Z$5,000 and Z$10,000 coins in June 2005, although these were never actually struck.

In its 2014 mid-term monetary policy statement, the Reserve Bank of Zimbabwe (RBZ) said it would import special coins, known as Zimbabwean bond coins, to ease a shortage of change in the economy. Like the original 1980 coins, these special coins would be denominated in 1, 5, 10, 20, and 50 cents, but would have values at par with US cents. There would also be South African rand coins of 10, 20, 50 cents, 1, 2, 5 rands. The RBZ's statement did not specify when or where these coins would be imported from, but a later report on 26 November 2014 clarified that over $40 million worth of these coins were expected to be delivered within the next week from Pretoria. On 18 December 2014, the 1, 5, 10, and 25 US cent denominations were released into circulation. The 50 US cent denomination followed in March 2015. A 1 dollar bond coin was released in November 2016.

== Banknotes and cheques ==
The banknotes of the Zimbabwean dollar were issued by the Reserve Bank of Zimbabwe from 1980 to 2009. Up to 2003, regular banknotes were issued, but as hyperinflation developed from 2003, the Reserve Bank issued short-lived emergency traveller's cheques.

== Exchange rate history ==
This table shows a condensed history of the foreign exchange rate of the Zimbabwean Dollars to one US Dollar:

First dollar
Second dollar
Third dollar

Month/Year	Exchange rate
1983	1
1997	10
2000	100
Jun 2002	1,000
Mar 2005	10,000
Jan 2006	100,000
Jul 2006	500,000+

Month	Exchange rate
Aug 2006	650
Sep 2006	1,000
Dec 2006	3,000
Jan 2007	4,800
Feb 2007	7,500
Mar 2007	26,000
Apr 2007	35,000
May 2007	50,000
Jun 2007	400,000
Jul 2007	300,000
Aug 2007	200,000

Month	Exchange rate
Sep 2007	600,000
Oct 2007	1,000,000
Nov 2007	1,500,000
Dec 2007	† 4,000,000
Jan 2008	6,000,000
Feb 2008	‡ 16,000,000
Mar 2008	70,000,000
Apr 2008	100,000,000
May 2008	777,500,000
Jun 2008	40,928,000,000
Jul 2008	758,530,000,000

Day	Exchange rate
August 2008	1,780
September 2008	590,000
7 October 2008	2,300,000
14 October 2008	10,700,000
21 October 2008	1,220,000,000
28 October 2008	251,000,000,000
8 November 2008	669,000,000,000

† Due to the December 2007 banknote shortage, funds transferred via Electronic Funds Transfer Systems (EFTS) bore a premium rate of about $4 million, while the cash transaction rate varied around $2 million.
‡ Exchange rate was 20,000,000 for large amounts.

The third dollar rates above are OMIR. The cash rate differs significantly from the above rates. The table below is the cash rate of the third dollar history:

Month	ZWR per USD
Sept 2008	1,000
Oct 2008	90,000
Nov 2008	1,200,000
Mid Dec 2008	60,000,000
End Dec 2008	2,000,000,000
Mid Jan 2009	1,000,000,000,000
2 February 2009	300,000,000,000,000

=== Initial period of devaluation ===
The first dollar (ZWD) devalued from 0.6788 R$ to US$1 in 1978 to roughly half a million per US$ in 2006, when the currency was revalued.

This table shows in more detail the historical value of one US dollar in Zimbabwean dollars:

Exchange rates of the first dollar (ZWD)
Date	Official Rate	Parallel Rate	Notes
1978	0.6788 R$ (Apr)	—N/a	R$ pegged to US$
1980	0.68 R$ (Mar)	—N/a	Z$ tied to basket of FRF, DEM, ZAR, CHF, GBP, USD
1980	0.68 R$ (Mar)	—N/a	18 April 1980 – Independence (1 Z$ = 1 R$)
1982	0.8925 to 0.9140 (Dec)	—	ZWD devalued by 16.5%
1983	0.96135 (Jan)	up to 3.18 (July)	ZWD devalued by 5% Parallel rate highly variable — premium up to 231%
1983 (Aug) to 1993 (Dec)	0.96135 – 6.82		Flexible basket; dual rates; 20% tax on outgoing payments
1994	6.82 (Jan)	8.36 (Oct)	Floating official rate (1 July); dual rates; ZWD devalued by 17%
1995	8.26 (Jan)	8.85 (Oct)	floating official rate; dual rates; rates unified 1998 (Dec)
1996	9.13 (Jan)	10.52 (Oct)	floating official rate; dual rates; rates unified 1998 (Dec)
1997	10.50 (Jan)	12.00 (Jan); 25.00 (Nov)	floating official rate; dual rates; rates unified 1998 (Dec)
1998	18.00 (Jan)	16.65 (Jun); 19.00 (Jul); 23.50	floating official rate; dual rates; rates unified 1998 (Dec)
1999	36.23 (Jan)	38.30 (Sep)	On 31 March 1999, the Official Exchange Rate was pegged at ZWD 38 per USD; the parallel market had re-emerged by December 1999.
2000	38 to 55	56 to 62 (Jul); 65 to 70 (Aug.)	In August 2000, the Official Exchange Rate was pegged at ZWD 50, then ZWD 51 and finally at ZWD 55 per USD; parallel black market rates were at a large premium; in November, foreign exchange bureaus were closed.
2001	55	70 (Jan); 80 (Feb); 100 (Mar); 120 (Apr); 140 (May); 160 (Jun); 250 (Jul); 300 (Aug); 400 (Sep); 300 (Oct); 320 (Nov); 340 (Dec)	In June, the official rate became a crawling peg rate.
2002	55	380 (Jan) to 710 (Jun), 1400 (Jul) to 1740 (Oct) to 1400 (Dec)	In 2002, the parallel black market for foreign exchange mushroomed.
2003	55 (Jan); 824 (Feb)	1400 (Jan); 1450 (Feb); 2300 (May); 3000 (Jul); 6000 (Aug); 6400 (Oct); 6000 (Nov)	In February 2003, the Official Exchange Rate was re-pegged at ZWD 824 per US $
2004	824 (1 January); 4196 (12 January) to 5730 (Dec)	5500 (1 January) to 6000 (Dec)	In January 2004, semiweekly (RBZ-controlled) currency auctions were set up to determine the official rate.
2005	5,730 (January); 6,200 (March); 9,000 (May); 10,800 (18 July); 17,600 (25 July); 24,500 (25 August); 26,003 (September); 26,003 (October); 60,000 (Nov); 84,588 (30 December)	6,400 (January); 14,000 (March); 20,000 (May); 25,000 (18 July); 45,000 (25 July); 45,000 (25 August); 75,000 (September); 80,000 to 100,000 (October); 90,000 (Nov); 96,000 (30 December)	24 August: Zimbabwean dollar becomes least valued currency unit
2005	5,730 (January); 6,200 (March); 9,000 (May); 10,800 (18 July); 17,600 (25 July); 24,500 (25 August); 26,003 (September); 26,003 (October); 60,000 (Nov); 84,588 (30 December)	6,400 (January); 14,000 (March); 20,000 (May); 25,000 (18 July); 45,000 (25 July); 45,000 (25 August); 75,000 (September); 80,000 to 100,000 (October); 90,000 (Nov); 96,000 (30 December)	In November 2005, the regular currency auctions were discontinued and the RBZ announced that "market factors" would control the exchange rate.
2006 (to 31 July)	85,158 (3 January); 99,201.58 (24 January); 101,195.54 (28 April)	100,000 (6 January); 106,050 (19 January); 115,000 (20 January); 125,000 to 150,000 (25 January); 175,000 to 190,000 (24 February); 205,000 to 220,000 (3 March); 220,000 to 230,000 (13 April); 300,000 to 310,000 (25 May); 315,000 (9 June); 340,000 to 350,000 (16 June); 400,000 (21 June); 450,000 (1 July); 520,000 (9 July); 550,000 (27 July)	Economists predict an unofficial rate of nearly ZWD 250,000 to the US dollar by mid-2006.
2006 (to 31 July)	85,158 (3 January); 99,201.58 (24 January); 101,195.54 (28 April)	100,000 (6 January); 106,050 (19 January); 115,000 (20 January); 125,000 to 150,000 (25 January); 175,000 to 190,000 (24 February); 205,000 to 220,000 (3 March); 220,000 to 230,000 (13 April); 300,000 to 310,000 (25 May); 315,000 (9 June); 340,000 to 350,000 (16 June); 400,000 (21 June); 450,000 (1 July); 520,000 (9 July); 550,000 (27 July)	24 January – RBZ caps daily variance of official exchange rate based on volume traded. The ZWD is able to fluctuate (from its average rate) in a daily band of: 0% (under US$5 million); 1% (US$5 to 10 million); 1.5% (US$10 to 15 million); or 2% (exceeds US$15 million). This effectively froze the official exchange rate.

=== Second period of devaluation ===
In the first redenomination of 1 August 2006, 1000 ZWD were exchanged for 1 second dollar (ZWN). The second dollar started off with an official rate of 250 and a parallel rate of 550 to the US$. By July 2008 the exchange rate with US$ had reached (parallel rate) 500 billion to 1 US$, leading to a second redenomination.

More detailed data can be found in the table below:

Exchange rates of the second dollar (ZWN)
Date		Official Rate (Revalued dollar)	Parallel Rate (Revalued dollar)	Notes
2006	August	250 (250,000 old)	550 (1 August); 650 (3 August); 650 to 700 (24 August)	1 August: RBZ revalues the Zim dollar. 1,000 Old Zim dollars become 1 revalued Zim dollar. The official exchange rate is set to 250 revalued Zim dollars per 1 US dollar. (Parallel rate soars to over 600 revalued dollars per 1 US dollar)
2006	September	250 (250,000 old)	700 to 800 (8 September – high volume transactions); 850 (14 September); 1,200 to 1,300 (28 Sep) or 1,500 (29 September – high volume transactions)	
2006	October	250 (250,000 old)	1,500 (12 October);	
2006	November	250 (250,000 old)	1,700 (6 November); 2,000 (19 November); 2,400 (29 November);	
2006	December	250 (250,000 old)	3,000 (25 December)	
2007	January	250	3,200 (11th); 3,500 (18th); 4,000 (20th); 4,200 (23rd); 6,000 (26th)	
2007	February	250	4,800 (2nd); 5,000 (12th); 6,600 (23rd); 7,000 (27th)	
2007	March	250	7,500 (1st) 8,000 (2nd); 10,000 (8th); 11,000 (11th); 12,000 – 17,500 (16th); 16,000 (19th); 20,000 (21st); 24,000 (22nd); 25,000 (27th); 26,000 (29th)	Zimbabwean dollar becomes least valued currency unit around 21 March; In March, the parallel rate becomes extremely erratic, with reported rates varying significantly.
2007	April	250 (15,000 special rate)	30,000 (1st); 15,000 (7th); 20,000 (8th); 25,000 (11th); 35,000 (15th)	A "special rate" of 15,000 ZWD per USD was brought in on 26 April 2007. The improved exchange rate will be applied to miners, farmers, tour operators, non-governmental organisations, embassies, Zimbabweans living abroad that repatriate earnings, and others who generate foreign exchange. Exporters will be required to exchange money at the central bank to receive the better rate.
2007	May	250 (15,000 special rate)	28,000 (10th); 32,000 (18th); 38,000 (20th); 40,000 (22nd); 45,000 (24th); 50,000 (29th)	
2007	June	250 (15,000 special rate)	55,000 (3rd); 60,000 (12th); 75–100,000 (13th); 120,000 (16th); 205,000 (20th); 300,000 (22nd); 400,000 (23rd)	
2007	July	250 (15,000 special rate)	270,000 (5th); 300,000 (14th)	
2007	August	250 (15,000 special rate)	200,000 (21st)	
2007	September	30,000	250,000 (7th); 280,000 (14th); 340,000 (18th); 500,000 (26th); 600,000 (29th)	Official exchange rate was changed to 30,000 on 7 September 2007
2007	October	30,000	750,000 (17th); 1,000,000 (19th)	
2007	November	30,000	1,200,000 (1st); 4,500,000 (14th) (not confirmed); 1,400,000 (24th); 1,500,000 (30th)	
2007	December	30,000	1,800,000 (1st); 4,000,000 (3rd)	Due to the Dec 2007, banknote shortage, funds transferred via Electronic Funds Transfer Systems (EFTS) bore a premium rate of about $4 million, while the cash transaction rate varied around $2 million.
2008	January	30,000	1,900,000 (3rd); 2,000,000 (4th); 3,000,000 (8th); 4,500,000 (19th); 5,000,000 (21st); 6,000,000 (24th)	The Old Mutual Implied Rate (OMIR) is calculated by dividing the Zimbabwe Stock Exchange price of the Old Mutual share by the London Stock Exchange Price for the same share. The answer is the Old Mutual Implied Rate for the Pound. Then a cross rate calculation is done for the USD rate. 6,240,837.51 (OMIR for 21st) 5,787,585.19 (OMIR for 25th)
2008	February	30,000	7,500,000 (13th); 8,500,000 (18th); 16,000,000 and 20,000,000 for large amounts (21st)	
2008	March	30,000	24,000,000 (2nd); 25,000,000 (5th); 46,000,000 (10th); 70,000,000 (19th)	69,226,148.58 (OMIR for 17th)
2008	April	30,000	80,000,000 (17th); 85,000,000 (24th); 100,000,000 (26th)	
2008	May	30,000 (to 4 May); 168,815,333.33 (5 May); 187,073,022.88 (6 May); 190,429,449.18 (7 May); 204,565,727.39 (8 May); 210,389,632.00 (9 May); 216,528,794.21 (12 May); 224,832,332.83 (13 May); 236,706,849.48 (14 May); 246,433,371.43 (15 May); 255,771,415.67 (16 May); 275,335,294.12 (19 May); 303,753,731.48 (20 May); 337,341,911.76 (21 May); 369,632,426.29 (22 May); 405,870,411.18 (23 May); 434,449,294.12 (27 May); 486,485,294.12 (28 May); 529,336,764.71 (29 May); 580,678,132.35 (30 May)	190,000,000 (1st); 200,000,000 (6th); 250,000,000 (13th); 315,000,000 (16th); 498,000,000 (22nd); 494,000,000 (23rd); 580,000,000 (28th); 703,000,000 (29th); 777,500,000 (30th)	The official exchange rate was allowed to float 6 May
	June	647,863,191.18 (2nd); 718,489,852.94 (3rd); 843,884,558.82 (4th); 969,647,058.82 (5th); 1,105,887,222.22 (6th); 1,365,130,333.33 (9th); 1,679,946,944.44 (10th); 2,150,078,888.89 (11th); 2,904,111,111.11 (12th); 3,524,549,987.29 (13th); 4,276,736,111.11 (16th); 4,952,500,000.00 (17th); 5,817,192,485.76 (18th); 6,718,055,555.56 (19th); 7,437,184,423.78 (20th); 8,260,031,632.83 (23rd); 9,005,149,886.88 (24th); 9,801,839,921.51 (25th); 10,594,701,303.45 (26th); 11,378,472,550.24 (30th)	971,500,000 (1st); 1,123,000,000 (3rd); 1,221,500,000 (4th); 1,964,500,000 (5th); 2,159,000,000 (6th); 2,691,588,425 (7th); 3,139,382,641 (9th); 4,605,736,200 (10th); 5,090,337,736 (11th); 5,137,128,498 (12th); 6,412,613,315 (13th); 7,512,863,828 (16th); 9,288,500,000 (17th); 13,999,000,000 (18th); 17,743,015,150 (19th); 20,269,600,000 (21st); 22,952,543,340 (23rd); 22,835,153,651 (24th); 32,603,770,511 (26th); 40,928,000,000 (30th)	967,480,942 (OMIR for 2nd); 1,746,899,809 (OMIR for 3rd); 3,047,030,834 (OMIR for 4th); 16,044,776,323 (OMIR for 19th); 17,039,490,724 (OMIR for 20th); 34,910,587,875 (OMIR for 23rd); 78,479,941,887 (OMIR for 24th); 62,024,868,786 (OMIR for 25th); 64,575,990,281 (OMIR for 26th); 164,312,344,622 (OMIR for 30th)
	July	12,226,034,516.65 (1st); 13,350,764,705.88 (2nd); 14,345,060,331.82 (3rd); 15,183,703,996.98 (4th); 16,204,996,229.26 (7th); 17,066,529,677.98 (8th); 17,883,023,378.58 (9th); 18,681,527,512.36 (10th); 19,489,294,117.65 (11th); 20,170,317,159.13 (14th); 21,460,313,914.03 (15th); 23,356,231,572.65 (16th); 25,389,017,580.37 (17th); 27,164,677,690.87 (18th); 30,201,803,133.32 (21st); 34,749,797,812.59 (22nd); 39,129,724,504.88 (23rd); 43,319,583,395.92 (24th); 48,679,445,871.90 (25th); 54,036,639,077.74 (28th); 58,886,562,526.04 (29th); 63,761,761,010.94 (30th); 69,484,070,056.18 (31st); (Source)	53,049,500,000 (1st); 65,797,000,000 (7th); 102,351,000,000 (8th); 145,624,500,000 (11th); 151,425,393,163 (11th); 193,014,500,000 (14th); 200,414,514,369 (14th); 274,200,889,709 (15th); 288,072,000,000 (16th); 325,110,110,211 (16th); 324,446,338,775 (17th); 360,000,000,000 (17th); 380,000,000,000 (18th); 430,000,000,000 (18th); 600,000,000,000 (21st);, 650,000,000,000 (22nd); 750,000,000,000 (23rd); 555,000,000,000 (25th): 758,530,000,000 (30th); 510,000,000,000 (31st):	142,024,433,315 (OMIR for 1st); 129,140,850,245 (OMIR for 2nd); 109,689,985,935 (OMIR for 3rd); 113,028,111,843 (OMIR for 4th); 202,409,619,045 (OMIR for 7th); 173,176,356,278 (OMIR for 8th); 126,117,317,180 (OMIR for 9th); 139,534,966,792 (OMIR for 10th); 189,961,549,747 (OMIR for 11th); 194,840,848,150 (OMIR for 14th); 236,850,692,832 (OMIR for 15th); 241,421,049,361 (OMIR for 16th); 270,477,236,528 (OMIR for 17th); 404,332,849,598 (OMIR for 18th); 502,683,475,196 (OMIR for 21st); 687,860,375,011 (OMIR for 22nd); 495,932,559,520 (OMIR for 23rd); 488,452,876,313 (OMIR for 24th); 619,334,351,928 (OMIR for 25th); 525,086,664,547 (OMIR for 28th); 456,921,446,064 (OMIR for 30th); 669,809,343,407 (OMIR for 31st); (Source)

==== Market data restoration ====
In the final months before Zimbabwe's central bank reforms of 30 April 2008, virtually all popular currency conversion resources relied upon the official rate of 30,000 ZWD to US$1 for published figures, in spite of the vast differences between that and free market rates. By 23 May 2008, Bloomberg and Oanda began publishing floating rates based on Zimbabwe's formally regulated domestic bank market, while Yahoo Finance started using the updated official rate in July, albeit with a decimal point shift of 6 places. Those reported rates generally reflected the Official Rate as shown in the above table. They soon began to differ, in overvaluation of the Zimbabwean dollar, increasingly substantially in comparison to less regulated markets such as offshore markets or paper cash freely traded on the streets of Harare, reflected above as Parallel Rates.

=== Third period of devaluation ===
On 1 August 2008, a second redenomination was conducted, in which 10,000,000,000 2nd dollars (ZWN) became 1 3rd dollar (ZWR). On 3 October 2008, the Reserve Bank of Zimbabwe temporarily suspended the Real Time Gross Settlement (RTGS) system, halting electronic parallel market transfers, but it was reinstated on 13 November 2008.

After being introduced on 1 August 2008, the third dollar continued to devalue.

An overview of the exchange rate data can be found in the table below:

Exchange rates of the third dollar (ZWR)
Date		Official Rate (Source: )	Parallel Rate (Sources: † / ‡)	Old Mutual Implied Rate (OMIR Source:)	Notes
2008	August	7.58 (1st); 8.11 (4th); 8.94 (5th); 9.92 (6th); 10.93 (7th); 11.90 (8th); 13.19 (13th); 14.52 (14th); 15.80 (15th); 17.49 (18th); 18.84 (19th); 20.08 (20th); 21.55 (21st); 23.29 (22nd); 25.34 (25th); 27.66 (26th); 29.91 (27th); 32.05 (28th); 34.83 (29th)	40.53 †; 51 ‡ (1st); 61 ‡ (2nd); 40.96 †; 66 ‡ (5th); 74 ‡ (8th); 41.79 † (11th); 110 ‡ (13th); 190 ‡; 64.12 † (14th); 230 ‡ (15th); 223.51 †; 375 ‡ (18th); 420 ‡ (19th); 430 ‡ (21st); 460 †; 440 ‡ (26th); 650 ‡; 700 † (27th); 1,400 †; 1,700 ‡ (29th)	49.23 (1st); 38.35 (4th); 34.05 (5th); 39.41 (6th); 64.19 (7th); 48.13 (8th); 74.86 (13th); 138.46 (14th); 121.43 (15th); 168.84 (18th); 161.24 (19th); 185.33 (20th); 297.21 (21st); 393.30 (22nd); 992.02 (25th); 749.47 (26th); 868.71 (27th); 1,330.10 (28th); 1,780.04 (29th)	1 August: The Reserve Bank revalued the dollar again: 10 billion ZWN (or 10 trillion ZWD) becomes 1 ZWR. See also: ["Zimbabwe's re-valued currency after one month"] includes a daily list of the ZWD parallel exchange rates in August 2008.
2008	September	37.15 (1st); 39.59 (2nd); 42.72 (3rd); 45.53 (4th); 48.79 (5th); 52.71 (8th); 58.10 (9th); 62.47 (10th); 67.52 (11th); 71.40 (12th); 77.69 (15th); 83.57 (16th); 88.70 (17th); 92.97 (18th); 96.43 (19th); 101.57 (22nd); 105.43 (23rd); 109.48 (24th); 114.61 (25th); 118.76 (26th); 125.75 (29th); 132.25 (30th)	2,000 †; 2,498 ‡ (1st); 2,800 †; 3,650 ‡ (2nd); 4,300 † (3rd); 4,500 † (4th); 4,800 † 5,700 ‡; 7,500 (5th); 8,500 ‡ (8th); 14,000 † (9th); 20,000 †; 29,000 ‡ (11th); 30,000 (12th); 34,000 † (15th); 22,000 †; 34,000 ‡ (16th); 33,000 † (18th); 65,059 †; 59,652 ‡ (22nd); 80,754 ‡ (23rd); 140,251 †; 135,368 ‡ (24th); 271,915 ‡ (25th); 271,593 † (26th); 554,915 †; 360,707 ‡ (29th); Cash: 1,000 (25th)	3,362 (1st); 3,949 (2nd); 4,311 (3rd); 5,085 (4th); 11,815 (5th); 13,583 (8th); 11,608 (9th); 14,936 (10th); 25,384 (11th); 19,788 (12th); 18,888 (15th); 11,633 (16th); 22,837 (17th); 34,606 (18th); 37,997 (19th); 79,816 (22nd); 131,237 (23rd); 270,794 (24th); 247,618 (25th); 266,075 (26th); 557,362 (29th); 592,416 (30th)	
2008	October	138.14 (1st); 145.62 (2nd); 153.10 (3rd); 160.46 (6th); 167.68 (7th); 176.33 (8th); 183.19 (9th); 198.93 (13th); 208.65 (14th); 217.72 (15th); 229.90 (16th); 244.05 (17th); 266.40 (20th); 290.92 (21st); 316.56 (22nd); 345.18 (23rd); 507.24 (28th); 558.53 (29th); 619.52 (30th)	790,510 ‡; 1,000,000 (1st); 4,000 (cash) (3rd); 11,000 (cash) (11th); 50,000,000 (16th); 100,000,000 (20th); 20,000 (cash) (20th); Cash: 50,000 (24th); 11,939,980,000 ‡; 25,137 (cash) ‡ (25th); 69,127 (cash) ‡ (27th); 90,000 (cash) (29th)	1,418,021 (1st); 841,881 (2nd); 660,732 (3rd); 1,715,118 (6th); 2,305,440 (7th); 2,045,021 (8th); 3,161,381 (9th); 4,183,564 (10th); 7,667,426 (13th); 10,706,802 (14th); 20,129,927 (15th); 66,418,944 (16th); 121,013,052 (17th); 333,500,825 (20th); 1,220,071,643 (21st); 3,178,696,865 (22nd); 26,867,910,902 (23rd); 98,339,944,470 (24th); 101,338,478,626 (27th am); 70,547,871,952 (27th pm); 233,621,089,202 (28th am); 250,783,986,568 (28th pm); 509,148,077,013 (29th am); 916,918,295,246 (29th pm); 2,443,676,912,678 (30th am); 3,949,870,500,674 (30th pm); 6,674,757,281,553 (31st am); 11,851,630,480,952 (31st pm)	Electronic bank transfers (RTGS) were suspended by the Reserve Bank on the 3rd. No funds can be transferred between banks, effectively aborting the parallel rates.
2008	November	769.68 (3rd); 851.74 (4th); 922.96 (5th); 1,024.63 (6th); 2,850.37 (7th); 4,651.33 (10th); 6,626.39 (11th); 8,399.31 (12th); 10,788.70 (13th); 13,469.56 (14th); 17,398.16 (17th); 25,593.66 (18th); 30,320.43 (19th); 34,912.83 (20th); 38,128.72 (21st); 44,182.50 (24th); 49,237.71 (25th); 56,197.60 (26th); 62,761.43 (27th); 70,197.01 (28th)	100,000 (cash) (5th); 30,000,000,000,000 ‡; 200,000 (cash) ‡ (7th); 28,400,000,000,000,000 ‡ (12th); 400,000 (cash) (12th); 650,000 (cash) ‡ (14th); 1,200,000 (cash) ‡ (24th)	12,405,270,255,015 (3rd am); 35,179,473,949,600 (3rd pm); 118,066,516,958,323 (4th am); 216,162,327,532,185 (4th pm); 267,539,344,335,978 (5th am); 225,497,447,368,896 (5th pm); 193,012,615,772,476 (6th am); 134,838,399,549,100 (6th pm); 182,325,758,081,729 (7th am); 663,325,716,143,026 (7th pm); 1,680,757,577,947,650 (10th am); 22,410,101,039,302,100 (10th pm); 44,754,638,846,288,100 (11th am); 27,157,406,063,618,700 (11th pm); 18,237,844,841,170,300 (12th am); 12,981,054,269,303,500 (12th pm); 19,148,534,621,367,600 (13th am); 41,974,524,821,395,400 (13th pm); 62,136,238,923,283,400 (14th am); 183,025,618,461,867,000 (14th pm); 251,649,721,203,565,000 (17th am); 642,371,437,695,221,000 (17th pm); 661,229,327,046,568,000 (18th am); 447,591,739,042,251,000 (18th pm); 439,481,070,796,885,000 (19th); 12,617,983,349,233,500 (20th)	The Reserve Bank lifted the suspension on the Real Time Gross Settlement System (RTGS) on 13 November As of 26 November newspaper reports stated the RTGS was still not operational, and part of the reason was that the Zimbabwean Government had not paid the company responsible for fitting the system. The Zimbabwe Stock Market, and consequently the OMIR, crashed on 20 November when allegations of market manipulation became public. ZSE chief executive Emmanuel Munyukwi revealed that a large number of multi-quad-, quin-, and sextillion cheques had bounced. Old Mutual has not traded since 20 November, so no meaningful OMIR figures are available. It is estimated that the OMIR on 25 November would have been 649,374,262,960,211.
2008	December	76,620.00 (1st); 83,613.46 (2nd); 89,826.13 (3rd); 100,330.21 (4th); 111,126.89 (5th); 128,734.67 (8th); 140,085.70 (9th); 154,661.25 (10th); 226,954.13 (11th); 404,294.50 (12th); 925,825.00 (17th); 1,151,656.00 (18th); 1,423,462.00 (19th); 1,748,530.00 (23rd); 2,133,117.00 (24th); 2,772,250.00 (29th); 3,641,246.00 (30th); 4,894,167.00 (31st)	2,000,000 (cash)‡ (2nd); 5,300,000 (cash)‡ (4th); 10,000,000 (cash) (5th); 25,000,000 (cash) (9th); 30,000,000 (cash)‡ (10th); 60,000,000 (cash) (12th); 150,000,000 (cash)‡ (16th); 200,000,000 (cash)‡ (17th); 600,000,000 (cash)‡ (19th); 9,000,000,000 (cash) (22nd); 2,000,000,000 (cash)‡ (24th)		
2009	January	5,601,509 (2nd); 6,386,667 (5th); 8,042,778 (7th); 8,676,674 (8th); 9,326,444 (9th); 10,148,113 (12th); 11,171,474 (13th); 13,856,763 (14th); 15,273,676 (15th); 16,744,890 (16th); 18,683,139 (19th); 20,215,883 (20th); 25,599,608 (21st); 30,577,532 (22nd); 36,844,444 (23rd); 44,796,944 (26th); 415,888,889 (27th); 1,407,917,306 (28th); 3,429,836,806 (29th); 7,039,188,034 (30th)	40,000,000,000 (12th); 3,000,000,000,000 (15th); 1,000,000,000,000 ‡(16th); 5,000,000,000,000 ‡(21st); 10,000,000,000,000 (22nd); 13,000,000,000,000 (23rd); 30,000,000,000,000 (27th); 40,000,000,000,000 (28th); 100,000,000,000,000 (29th)	35,000,000,000,000,000 (1st) – UN Rate; 150,000,000,000,000,000 (29th) – UN Rate	
2009	February	12,336,416,667 (2nd)	250,000,000,000,000 (1st); 300,000,000,000,000 (2nd)		

=== Final period of devaluation ===
On 2 February 2009, a third redenomination took place, in which the RBZ removed 12 zeros from the currency, with 1,000,000,000,000 (third, ZWR) Zimbabwe dollars being exchanged for 1 new (fourth, ZWL) dollar. Therefore, the fourth dollar (ZWL) is equivalent to 10,000,000,000,000,000,000,000,000, or 1×10^{25} or 10 septillion first dollars (ZWD) (or 1 trillion third dollars). Although the dollar was abandoned on 12 April 2009, exchange rates were maintained at intervals for some months.

On 4 June 2015, it was announced that the Reserve Bank of Zimbabwe would exchange some of the old banknotes for US dollars.

Exchange rates of the fourth dollar (ZWL)
Date		Official rate	Parallel rate	United Nations rate (Source: )	Notes
2009	February	22.00 (3rd); 24.51 (4th); 28.54 (5th); 32.19 (6th); 35.34 (9th); 38.80 (10th); 42.32 (11th); 46.07 (12th); 49.87 (13th); 53.00 (16th); 58.04 (17th); 62.70 (18th); 66.49 (19th); 71.21 (20th); 76.22 (23rd); 81.58 (24th); 86.15 (25th); 91.39 (26th); 95.42 (27th)	300 (2nd)	150,000 (3rd)	
2009	March	99.67 (2nd); 103.29 (3rd); 108.01 (4th); 113.12 (5th); 117.26 (6th); 121.85 (9th); 126.11 (10th); 131.00 (11th); 134.92 (12th); 138.58 (13th); 143.42 (16th); 150.52 (17th); 156.69 (18th); 163.34 (19th); 170.39 (20th); 177.25 (23rd); 186.61 (24th); 193.52 (25th); 199.76 (26th); 206.74 (27th); 209.62 (30th); 213.07 (31st)			
2009	April	221.29 (1st); 225.83 (2nd); 230.68 (3rd); 238.94 (6th); 244.81 (7th); 245.21 (8th); 249.40 (9th); 255.19 (14th); 259.10 (15th); 263.94 (16th); 266.64 (17th); 271.04 (20th); 294.18 (24th); 306.68 (29th); 309.31 (30th)			12 April: Zimbabwe Dollar suspended.
2009	May	315.23 (4th); 319.13 (5th); 328.36 (6th); 320.02 (7th); 326.26 (8th); 329.65 (11th); 332.26 (12th); 336.46 (13th); 345.12 (14th); 350.30 (15th); 354.58 (19th); 357.48 (20th); 360.64 (21st); 363.14 (22nd)			
2009	June	363.48 (16th)			
2009	July	371.39 (16th)			
2009	August	361.62 (28th)			

== Value as collectable ==
Shortly after the Zimbabwean dollar was discontinued, they were purchased as curiosities, or in quantity as novelty gifts, for example to financial advisers' clients, to show why they should invest in diverse assets instead of cash. Later, they were purchased as an investment, to sell to collectors. Between 2011 and 2016, the resale value of $100 trillion notes on eBay rose by about 1,500% in pounds sterling, significantly outpacing the FTSE 100, which rose by about 5% in the same period.

== See also ==
- Argentine peso – another currency that hyperinflated multi-trillionfold since 1970
- Banknotes of Zimbabwe
- Economy of Zimbabwe
- Hungarian pengő – a currency that dropped 21 zeroes in 1946
- Redenomination
- Zimbabwean bond notes and coins
- Zimbabwean ZiG (Zimbabwe Gold)

== Notes ==
Preceded by: Rhodesian dollar Reason: independence recognised Ratio: at par	Currency of Zimbabwe; 1980 – 2009; Note: 1st dollar (ZWD): 1980 – 2006; 2nd dollar (ZWN = 1 000 ZWD): 2006 – 2008; 3rd dollar (ZWR = 10^{10} ZWN): 2008 – 2009; 4th dollar (ZWL = 10^{12} ZWR): February 2009 – April 2009	Succeeded by: Multi-currency system Reason: hyperinflation Ratio: 1 USD = 250 ZWL
Preceded by: Rhodesian dollar Reason: independence recognised Ratio: at par	Currency of Zimbabwe; 1980 – 2009; Note: 1st dollar (ZWD): 1980 – 2006; 2nd dollar (ZWN = 1 000 ZWD): 2006 – 2008; 3rd dollar (ZWR = 10^{10} ZWN): 2008 – 2009; 4th dollar (ZWL = 10^{12} ZWR): February 2009 – April 2009	Succeeded by: Zimbabwean bonds Reason: shortage of hard currency Ratio: $1 = 250 ZWL
