= Near money =

Assets easily converted into cash

Near money or quasi-money consists of highly liquid assets which are not cash but can easily be converted into cash.

Examples of near money include:

- Savings accounts
- Money market funds
- Bank time deposits (certificates of deposit)
- Government treasury securities (such as T-bills)
- Bonds near their redemption date
- Foreign currencies, especially widely traded ones such as the US dollar, euro or yen
- Some cryptocurrencies

Near money is not included in narrowly defined versions of the money supply, but broader versions include some types of near money.

== History ==
Over the past three centuries, what has been accepted by the public as money has been expanded from gold and silver coins to include first bank notes, and then bank deposits subject to transfer by check (cheque). Until recently, most economists would have agreed that money stopped at that point. No such agreement exists today, and the definition of money appropriate to present circumstances is debated. Since the 18th century, economists have known that the amount of money in circulation is an important economic variable. As the theories became more carefully specified in the 19th and early 20th centuries, they included a variable called the money supply.

== Functions of money ==
Money is often defined in terms of the three functions or services: as a medium of exchange, as a store of value and as a unit of account.

=== Medium of exchange ===
Money's most important function is as a medium of exchange to facilitate transactions. Without money, all transactions would have to be conducted by barter, which involves direct exchange of one good or service for another.

=== Store of value ===
In order to be a medium of exchange, money must hold its value over time; that is, it must be a store of value. If money could not be stored for some period of time and still remain valuable in exchange, it would not solve the double coincidence of wants problem and therefore would not be adopted as a medium of exchange.

=== Unit of account ===
Money also functions as a unit of account, providing a common measure of the value of goods and services being exchanged. Knowing the value or price of a good, in terms of money, enables both the supplier and the purchaser of the good to make decisions about how much of the good to supply and how much of the good to purchase.

== Assets with slightly lower liquidity ==
Thus near money can be considered as assets that fulfill the store-of-value function (as well as can be expected given the economic conditions) and are readily converted into a medium of exchange but are not themselves a medium of exchange. Deposits at a bank, savings and loan association, or building society etc. are a characteristic form of near money. Provided that the terms of the account permit immediate withdrawal, the deposit owner knows how much purchasing power he currently holds, and can turn the deposit into a medium of exchange (cash or a checking deposit/current account ) almost immediately.

Short fixed-term deposits (such as thirty-day treasury bills) and government bonds which are close to their maturity date are examples of assets which are not quite as liquid as a bank account that permits immediate withdrawal, but in many circumstances the difference is not important. Such assets are therefore often also regarded as "near money".

== See also ==
- Money supply
- Deposit account
- Savings account

== Sources ==
- Edwards, Franklin R. (August 1972). "More on Substitutability Between Money and Near-Monies". Journal of Money, Credit and Banking. 4 (3). Ohio State University Press: 551–571. doi:10.2307/1991128. JSTOR 1991128.
- Nagel, Stefan (November 2016). "The Liquidity Premium of Near-Money Assets". The Quarterly Journal of Economics. 131 (4). Cambridge, Mass.: Oxford University Press: 1927–1971. doi:10.1093/qje/qjw028. hdl:2027.42/107446.
- Chetty, V. Karuppan (June 1969). "On Measuring the Nearness of Near-Moneys". American Economic Review. 59 (3): 270–281. JSTOR 1808957.
