= John Mangudya =

Zimbabwean economic politician (born 1963)

John Panonetsa Mangudya (born 5 October 1963) is a former governor of the Reserve Bank of Zimbabwe. He was appointed in March 2014 by the then Zimbabwean president, Robert Mugabe, and began his tenure as governor on 1 May that year. His second 5 year term ended on 28 March 2024. He succeeded Gideon Gono as the governor of Zimbabwe's central bank and became the nation's 6th substantial exchequer.

== Early life and education ==
Mangudya was born in the Mutambara area of Melsetter (now Chimanimani), in Manicaland Southern Rhodesia, the youngest of twelve children.

Mangudya earned bachelor's and master's degrees in economics from the University of Zimbabwe, where he won several book prizes for his academic achievements. He also has a PhD in Economics from Washington International University. His PhD qualification however, has been questioned by critics who have noted that it was obtained from an unaccredited institution in the United States.

== Reserve Bank of Zimbabwe governorship ==
John Mangudya started work as RBZ governor on 1 May 2014 after being appointed into office by Robert Mugabe. He took over from Charity Dhliwayo who had been acting since November 2013 following Gideon Gono's retirement. In May 2019, his expired contract was renewed for a further 5 years by Emmerson Mnangagwa. He was succeeded by John Mushayavanhu in March 2024.

=== Bond notes and coins ===
A few months after assuming office, Mangudya introduced bond notes at that time stated not to be a currency, but a legal tender pegged to be with the same value as the US dollar. The bond coins were introduced to remedy a lack of small change. In November 2016, Mangudya also introduced bond notes, pegged at the same value as the US Dollar again.

=== RTGS Dollar ===
The bond notes and bond coins continued losing value against the US dollar on the parallel market and this led Mangudya to the introduce a new currency, the RTGS Dollar in February 2019. The RTGS dollar was introduced to bring sanity in the foreign currency market, promote diaspora remittances, protect foreign investments and exports.

== Career profile ==
Banking career
Period	Company/Organisation	Position held
1986-1996	Reserve Bank of Zimbabwe	Economist
1996-1999	Afrixembank	Southern Africa regional manager
2000-2004	CBZ	General manager
2004-2006	CBZ	Executive director
2006-2012	CBZ	Managing director
2012- March 2014	CBZ	Group CEO
March 2014 – March 2024	Reserve Bank of Zimbabwe	Governor

Boards
Organisation	Position
Industrial Development Corporation of Zimbabwe	Chairman
Agricultural Marketing Authority of Zimbabwe	Chairman
Afreximbank	Board member
Africa University	Board member

== Personal life ==
Mangudya is married to Tapiwa Mangudya and they have three children. He is a member of the United Methodist Church.
