= Zimbabwean dollar (2019–2024) =

Currency of Zimbabwe from 2019 to 2024

Z$
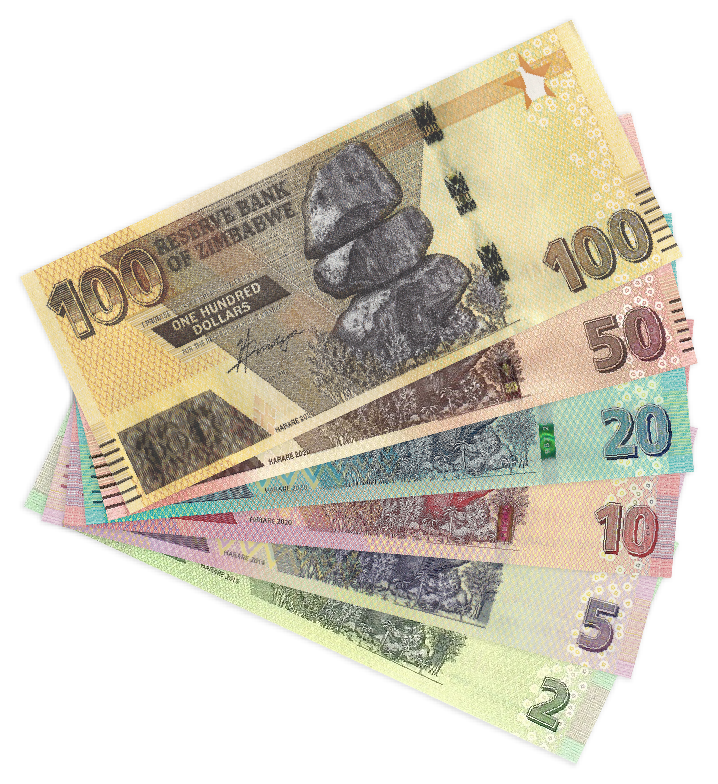
- Banknotes

ISO 4217
- Code: ZWL (Note: The current Zimbabwean dollar reuses the ISO code ZWL, which was assigned on 6 February 2009. For the local currency in use from 1980 to 12 April 2009, see Zimbabwean dollar (1980–2009).)
- Subunit: 0.01

Units of account
- Base unit: dollar
- Symbol: $
- Nickname: Zimdollar, Zollar
- Subunit
- 1/100: cent
- Symbol
- cent: ¢

Denominations
- Banknotes
- Freq. used: $10, $20, $50, $100
- Rarely used: $2, $5
- Coins
- Rarely used: 1¢, 5¢, 10¢, 25¢, 50¢, $1, $2

Demographics
- Date of introduction: 25 February 2019
- Date of withdrawal: 8 April 2024
- Replaced by: Zimbabwe Gold
- User(s): Zimbabwe

Issuance
- Central bank: Reserve Bank of Zimbabwe
- Website: www.rbz.co.zw
- Printer: De La Rue; Giesecke&Devrient; Oberthur Technologies
- Mint: South African Mint

Valuation
- Inflation: 55.34%
- Source: RBZ Archived 12 December 2022 at the Wayback Machine, March 2024
- Method: CPI
- This infobox shows the latest status before this currency was rendered obsolete.

The Zimbabwean dollar (sign: Z$; code: ZWL), also known as the Zimdollar or Real Time Gross Settlement (RTGS) dollar, was the currency of Zimbabwe from February 2019 to April 2024. It was the only legally permitted currency for trade in Zimbabwe from June 2019 to March 2020, after which foreign currencies were legalised again.

Due to the sharp depreciation of the Zimdollar, beginning almost immediately after its introduction, where possible, most transactions were being done in hard currencies, such as the U.S. dollar, despite their illegality until March 2020. On 5 April 2024, it was announced that the Zimdollar would be replaced by the new Zimbabwe Gold (ZiG), a gold-backed currency, starting on 8 April. On 31 August 2024, the Zimbabwean dollar (ZWL) was officially retired.

== History ==
=== Background ===
On 29 January 2009, the Zimbabwean government legalised the use of foreign currencies, such as the United States dollar and the South African rand. In response, Zimbabweans quickly abandoned the old Zimbabwean dollar, which was collapsing from what was at the time the second-highest ever rate of hyperinflation in the world (after the Hungarian pengő in 1946). On 12 April 2009, the power-sharing government of then-Prime Minister Morgan Tsvangirai suspended the old dollar. Some time later, the Reserve Bank of Zimbabwe demonetised the last banknotes of the old dollar, on 30 September 2015.

The multi-currency system eventually resulted in a liquidity crisis, because Zimbabwe had to import more than what they could export, resulting in a net exodus of US dollars. Eventually, the Reserve Bank introduced a series of bond coins on 18 December 2014, and bond notes on 28 November 2016, after securing a total of US$250 million in loans from the African Export-Import Bank.

Although bond money was officially interchangeable at par with the US dollar, the general public quickly resisted them as an attempt to reintroduce the Zimbabwean dollar, which had gained a bad reputation due to hyperinflation. That, along with the continued shortage of US dollars in Zimbabwe, resulted in a thriving parallel exchange rate that ranged between $3.00 and $3.80 in bond money to the US dollar, in February 2019.

=== Introduction of the fifth dollar ===
The parallel rate and the continued shortage of US dollars created a situation where the Reserve Bank could no longer maintain the peg with the US dollar. The Reserve Bank also wanted to end the system of different exchange rates, which resulted in customers paying more or less depending on the payment method. On 20 February 2019, Reserve Bank governor John Mangudya announced the introduction of a new Zimbabwean dollar, initially called the Real Time Gross Settlement dollar (RTGS dollar). The RTGS dollar, which started trading on 25 February, consisted of real-time gross settlement balances (hence the name), and existing bond notes and bond coins (both of which were devalued by 60% to Z$2.50 per US dollar).

On 24 June 2019, the Zimbabwean government renamed the RTGS dollar as the Zimbabwean dollar, and banned the use of foreign currencies in an attempt to end the multi-currency system. The BBC reported widespread opposition to the ban, partly due to continued public distrust, partly due to high inflation, and partly due to traders still having to use hard currencies to import goods from abroad. The onset of the coronavirus pandemic soon forced the Reserve Bank to reinstate the multi-currency system, on 29 March 2020.

On 29 October 2019, the Reserve Bank claimed that a new currency would replace the fifth dollar. This claim turned out to be a new $2 bond coin, and revised $2 and $5 banknotes without the "bond note" inscription: both entered circulation on 11 November 2019. The Reserve Bank continued to introduce higher value banknotes, with the $100 note entering circulation on 5 April 2022.

=== Continued high inflation ===
The fifth Zimbabwean dollar continued to undergo very high inflation, due to continued public distrust and the continued shortage of hard currency as a result of importers being unable to use Zimbabwean dollars. Almost immediately after the Reserve Bank abolished the peg, the official rate against the US dollar declined to Z$2.80 on 22 March 2019, and Z$6.00 on 12 June 2019, while the parallel rate fluctuated between Z$7.00 and Z$13.00 by 3 July. The Reserve Bank's annual inflation rate surpassed 100% in June 2019, and 500% in December 2019. As of December 2022, the Reserve Bank annual inflation rate was 243.76%: the highest (since February 2019) was 837.53% in July 2020, and the lowest was 50.25% in August 2021. Use of Zimbabwean dollars in Zimbabwe declined in favour of hard currencies, and as a result, in February 2023, Zimbabwe switched its headline inflation rate to one that blended Zimbabwean dollar and US dollar prices, which was criticised by businesses for hiding the real inflation rate in local currency, which persisted despite the use of a "blended" inflation rate.

The inflation and ensuing depreciation of the Zimbabwean dollar is the result of the Reserve Bank of Zimbabwe increasing the money supply. In February 2019, the circulating broad money supply was Z$10.4 billion. By the end of 2022, it had swelled to Z$2.34 trillion. In May and June 2023, the money supply quadrupled in just two months, resulting in the Zimbabwean dollar rapidly depreciating.

Time	Broad money (M3) in million ZWL	Consumer price index in ZWL terms
June 2019	14,768	172.61
December 2019	35,018	551.63
June 2020	99,821	1,445.21
December 2020	204,925	2,474.51
June 2021	302,934	2,986.44
December 2021	475,362	3,977.46
June 2022	1,119,696	8,707.35
December 2022	2,338,227	13,672.91
June 2023	14,275,475	See text above
December 2023	18,914,587	See text above
March 2024	59,171,485	See text above

The Zimbabwean dollar continued to depreciate. From January to April 2024, it lost over 70% of its value at the official exchange rate, hitting Z$30,000 per US dollar on 5 April. Annual inflation increased from 26.5% in December 2023 to 55.3% in March 2024. The money supply at that point had grown to Z$59 trillion, having increased by a factor of nearly 5,700 since the currency was introduced.

=== Introduction of Zimbabwean ZiG ===
On 5 April 2024, the Reserve Bank of Zimbabwe announced a new currency to be introduced on 8 April 2024, called the Zimbabwe Gold (ZiG), replacing the Zimbabwean dollar. ZiG is to be backed by a basket of reserves comprising foreign currency and precious metals (mainly gold). Zimbabweans were given 21 days to convert their cash into ZiG. John Mushayavanhu, the governor of the Reserve Bank of Zimbabwe, said he expected the new currency to have an impact on inflation and that it would circulate alongside foreign currencies.

== Banknotes ==
Zimbabwean banknotes that have entered circulation since 2016 have the signature of John Mangudya, who succeeded Charity Dhliwayo as the governor of the Reserve Bank of Zimbabwe on 1 May 2014.

In 2022, the Reserve Bank started the process of removing $2 and $5 banknotes from circulation, due to long-term high inflation: on 5 April 2022, the official exchange rates for those banknotes were 1.4 and 3.5 US cents, respectively.

=== Bond notes ===
The $2 and $5 bond notes entered circulation on 28 November 2016 and 3 February 2017, respectively.

Bond notes, 2016 (Signature: John Mangudya, Capital: Harare)
Pick No.	Image		Value	Dimensions	Main colour	Description			Date of		
Pick No.	Obverse	Reverse	Value	Dimensions	Main colour	Obverse	Reverse	Watermark	printing	issue	withdrawal
99			$2	155 × 62 mm	Green	Balancing rocks of Zimbabwe with trees	Eternal Flame at the National Heroes' Acre, and the Old Parliament House	Zimbabwe Bird and "RBZ"	2016	28 November 2016	11 November 2019
100			$5	155 × 66 mm	Purple	Balancing rocks of Zimbabwe with trees	Three giraffes and the Zimbabwe Aloe (Aloe excelsa)	Zimbabwe Bird and "RBZ"	2016	3 February 2017	11 November 2019
These images are to scale at 0.7 pixel per millimetre (18 pixel per inch). For table standards, see the banknote specification table.

=== 2019–2024 series ===
On 11 November 2019, the Reserve Bank issued regular banknotes for the first time since 2009, with commercial banks releasing them to the general public on the following day: the regular $2 and $5 banknotes were similar to the bond notes, but they did not have the "bond note" inscription on either side. $10 and $20 notes entered circulation on 19 May and 1 June 2020, respectively.

The $50 note entered circulation on 6 July 2021, and became the first Zimbabwean banknote since the withdrawal of the Rhodesian pound in 1970 to feature a person: a portrait of Mbuya Nehanda, a significant figure of Zimbabwean nationalism, appears on reverse with the Tomb of the Unknown Soldier at the National Heroes' Acre. This was followed by the $100 banknote on 5 April 2022, which featured the ruins of Great Zimbabwe.

2019 banknote series (Signature: John Mangudya, Capital: Harare)
Image		Value	Dimensions	Main colour	Obverse	Reverse	Watermark	Date of			Ref.
obverse	reverse	Value	Dimensions	Main colour	Obverse	Reverse	Watermark	printing	issue	withdrawal	Ref.
		$2	155 × 62 mm	Green	Domboremari with trees	Eternal Flame at the National Heroes' Acre, and the Old Parliament House	Zimbabwe Bird and "RBZ"	2019	11 November 2019	30 April 2024	
		$5	155 × 66 mm	Purple	Domboremari with trees	Three giraffes and the Zimbabwe Aloe (Aloe excelsa)	Zimbabwe Bird and "RBZ"	2019	11 November 2019	30 April 2024	
		$10	155 × 66 mm	Red	Domboremari with trees	New Reserve Bank Tower and four African buffaloes (Syncerus caffer)	Zimbabwe Bird and "RBZ"	2020	19 May 2020	30 April 2024	
		$20	155 × 66 mm	Blue	Domboremari with trees	African elephant and Victoria Falls (Mosi-oa Tunya)	Zimbabwe Bird and "RBZ"	2020	1 June 2020	30 April 2024	
		$50	155 × 66 mm	Brown	Domboremari with trees	Tomb of the Unknown Soldier at the National Heroes' Acre, and Mbuya Nehanda	Zimbabwe Bird and "RBZ"	2020	6 July 2021	30 April 2024	
		$100	155 × 66 mm	Yellow	Domboremari with trees	African baobab (Adansonia digitata) and the ruins of Great Zimbabwe	Zimbabwe Bird and "RBZ"	2020	5 April 2022	30 April 2024	
For table standards, see the banknote specification table.

== Relationship with foreign currencies ==
When the RTGS Dollar was introduced in February 2019, Zimbabweans used a mix of foreign currencies including the US dollar, the South African rand, and the Chinese yuan. On 24 June 2019, the Zimbabwean government banned the use of foreign currencies in local transactions. However, high inflation due to unrestrained issuance, continued public resistance to the Zimbabwean dollar, and the worsening coronavirus pandemic forced the government to allow Zimbabweans to use foreign currencies again, on 29 March 2020. The government said that the authorization to use US dollars in local transactions was just temporary, but by June 2020, some Zimbabwean civil service personnel were already demanding payment of their salaries in US dollars, due to hyperinflation in the Zimdollar. On 27 October 2023, the government decided to keep foreign currencies as legal tender until 2030. As of March 2024, 80% of all transactions in Zimbabwe were in US dollars.

== Exchange rates ==
By March 2020, an attempt was made to peg the Zimdollar at US$1 = 25 RTGS$, but inflation continued and this effort was abandoned.

Annual inflation in the period ending July 2020 was 837.53% as reported by ZIMSTAT.

The exchange rate is determined by the forces of supply and demand on an auction market the Reserve Bank of Zimbabwe set up along with the announcement of the RTGS dollar. The market is called Interbank Foreign Currency Exchange Market and is made up of banks and bureaux de change.

In late June 2020 the Reserve Bank of Zimbabwe launched a new weekly auction of foreign currency, to try to curb the rampant inflation which had driven the Zimdollar down to US$1 = 80 Zimdollars. Inflation continued for the Zimdollar, and by May 2022, it was "officially quoted at 165.94 against the U.S. dollar while sliding continuously on the black market, where it is [was] currently trading between 330 and 400 to the US dollar." In an attempt to stop additional speculation in the Zimdollar, in May 2022, the Treasury ordered banks to stop lending, to be effective immediately.

In July 2022 the Reserve Bank of Zimbabwe announced the introduction of official gold coins into the market "as a store of value". The gold coins are called "Mosi-oa-Tunya", and they are expected to be sold for either Zimdollars or United States dollars at rates based upon the prevailing international price of gold plus the costs of production. On 12 February 2024, the Finance Minister of Zimbabwe, Mthuli Ncube, said the Zimbabwean dollar could have its exchange rate linked to gold. In this case, it would be the only country in the world with the gold standard.

On 5 April 2024, the Reserve Bank of Zimbabwe announced a new currency to be introduced on 8 April, called Zimbabwean Gold (ZiG), backed by a basket of reserves comprising foreign currency and precious metals (mainly gold). Zimbabweans were given 21 days to convert their cash into ZiG.

The Zimbabwean dollar experienced rapid depreciation before its replacement. Between 2 May and 17 June 2023, it depreciated by about 83%, from Z$1,070.42 to Z$6,351.50 against the US dollar, at the official exchange rate. On 30 January 2024, it weakened past Z$10,000 per US dollar, and on 22 March 2024, it dropped below Z$20,000 per US dollar. On 5 April 2024, it hit Z$30,000 per US dollar, the same day the new currency was announced.

== See also ==
- Zimbabwean bond notes
- Zimbabwean bond coins
- Zimbabwe Gold

== Notes ==
Preceded by: Multi-currency system Reason: attempted dedollarisation Ratio: $1 = US$2.50	Currency of Zimbabwe; 2019 – 2024; Note: Sole legal currency from June 2019 to March 2020	Succeeded by: Zimbabwean ZiG; Reason: inflation Ratio: 1 ZiG = $2,498.7242
Preceded by: Zimbabwean bonds Reason: attempted dedollarisation Ratio: at par	Currency of Zimbabwe; 2019 – 2024; Note: Sole legal currency from June 2019 to March 2020	Succeeded by: Zimbabwean ZiG; Reason: inflation Ratio: 1 ZiG = $2,498.7242
