= Dissotis =

Scientific classification
- Kingdom: Plantae
- Clade: Tracheophytes
- Clade: Angiosperms
- Clade: Eudicots
- Clade: Rosids
- Order: Myrtales
- Family: Melastomataceae
- Genus: Dissotis; Benth. (1849)

Species
- 9; see text

Synonyms
- Hedusa Raf. (1838); Kadalia Raf. (1838), nom. utique rej.; Lignieria A.Chev. (1920), nom. nud.; Osbeckiastrum Naudin (1850); Pseudosbeckia A.Fern. & R.Fern. (1956)

Genus of flowering plants

Dissotis is a genus of plants in the family Melastomataceae. It includes nine species of annual or perennial herbs, shrubs, or small trees which are native to tropical Africa.

== Etymology ==
The generic name is based on the Greek word dissos, which means 'twofold'. This refers to the two types of anthers that is a characteristic of this genus.

== Taxonomy ==
Until recently Dissotis contained dozens of species, organized into four sections – Dissotis, Macrocarpae, Sessilifoliae, and Squamulosae. A 2020 study found that the genus was polyphyletic, and most species formerly placed in Dissotis were placed in five new genera – Almedanthus (for Dissotis pachytricha), Eleotis (for former Dissotis sect. Sessilifoliae), Feliciotis (for former sect. Macrocarpae), Pyrotis (for D. gilgiana) and Rosettea (for former sect. Squamulosae) – or into the existing or revived genera Antherotoma, Derosiphia, and Nerophila.

== Species ==
As accepted by Kew;

- Dissotis elegans (Robyns & Lawalrée) A.Fern. & R.Fern.
- Dissotis grandiflora (Sm.) Benth.
- Dissotis homblei (De Wild.) A.Fern. & R.Fern.
- Dissotis idanreensis Brenan
- Dissotis lebrunii (Robyns & Lawalrée) A.Fern. & R.Fern.
- Dissotis leonensis Hutch. & Dalziel
- Dissotis longisetosa Gilg & Ledermann ex Engl.
- Dissotis splendens A.Chev. & Jacq.-Fél.
- Dissotis swynnertonii (Baker f.) A.Fern. & R.Fern.
