= Banknotes of Zimbabwe =

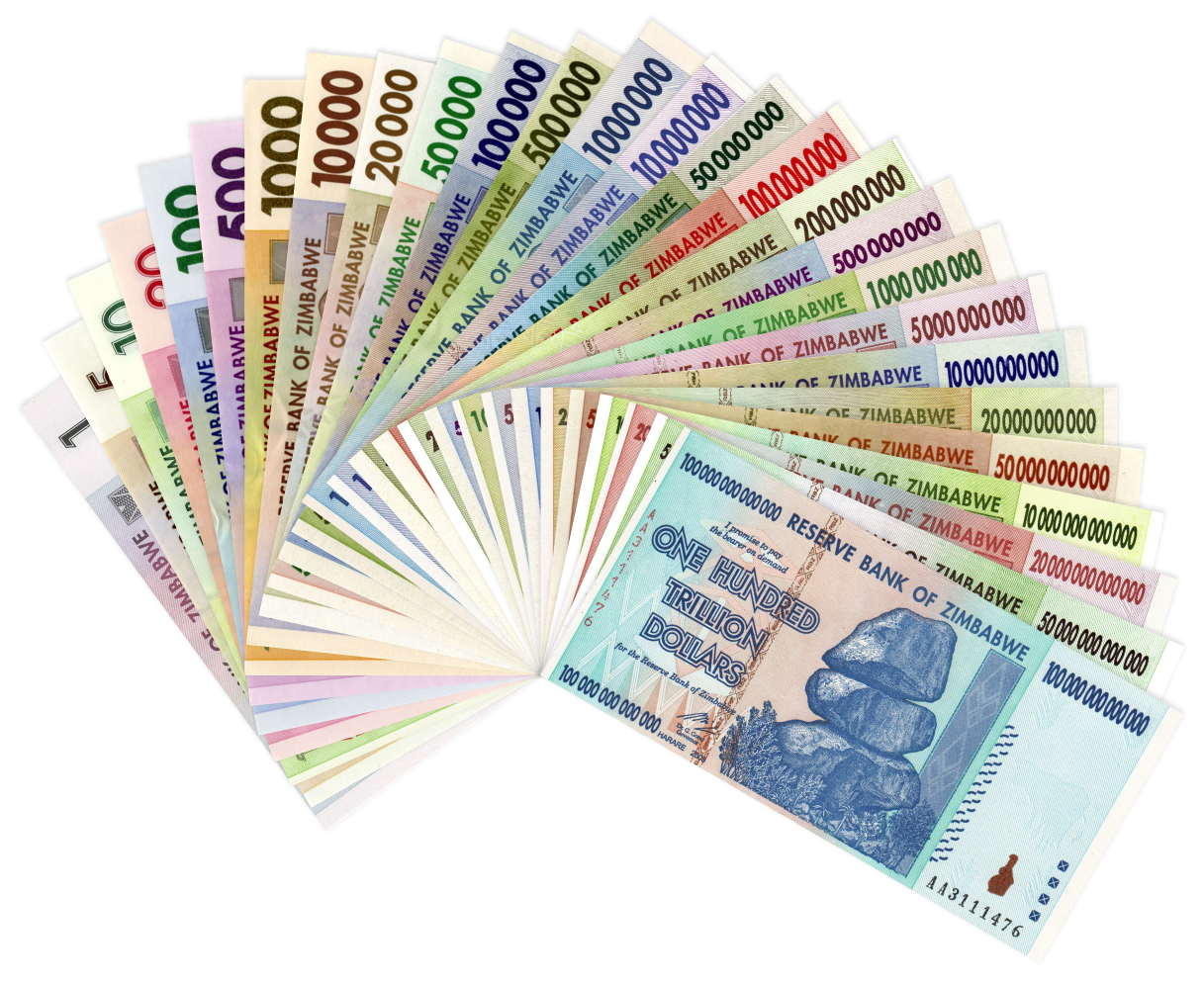
- Banknotes of the third Zimbabwean dollar, from $1 to $100 trillion

First Zimbabwean dollar (1980–2006)
- ISO 4217 code: ZWD
- Denominations: $2 to $1,000 (banknotes); $5,000 to $100,000 (bearer cheques)

Second Zimbabwean dollar (2006–2008)
- ISO 4217 code: ZWN
- Equal to: 1,000 ZWD
- Denominations: 1¢ to $500 million (bearer cheques); $5 billion to $100 billion (agro-cheques)

Third Zimbabwean dollar (2008–2009)
- ISO 4217 code: ZWR
- Equal to: 10^{10} ZWN, 10^{13} ZWD
- Denominations: $1 to $100 trillion

Fourth Zimbabwean dollar (2009)
- ISO 4217 code: ZWL
- Equal to: 10^{12} ZWR, 10^{22} ZWN, 10^{25} ZWD
- Denominations: $1 to $500

Zimbabwean bond notes (2016–2019)
- Denominations: $2 and $5

Fifth Zimbabwean dollar (2019–2024)
- ISO 4217 code: ZWL (Note: The fifth Zimbabwean dollar reused the ISO 4217 code ZWL, first assigned for the fourth dollar on 6 February 2009.)
- Equal to: One bond dollar
- Denominations: $2 to $100

Zimbabwean ZiG (2024–present)
- ISO 4217 code: ZWG
- Equal to: 2,498.7242 ZWL
- Denominations: 10 ZiG, 20 ZiG, 50 ZiG

Issuance
- Country: Zimbabwe
- Issuers: Reserve Bank of Zimbabwe (1980–2009, 2016–present); Standard Chartered (2003–2004)

The banknotes of Zimbabwe are the physical forms of Zimbabwean currency, including the dollar ($ or Z$) and the ZiG. The Reserve Bank of Zimbabwe has issued most of the banknotes and other types of currency notes in its history, including bearer cheques and special agro-cheques ("agro" being short for agricultural) that circulated from September 2003 until December 2008, and bond notes from November 2016 until November 2019: Standard Chartered Zimbabwe also circulated their own emergency cheques from June 2003 to September 2004.

The first Zimbabwean banknotes were rolled out for the first dollar between July 1981 an April 1982, and replaced those of the Rhodesian dollar at par: banknotes (and later bearer cheques) of the first dollar circulated until August 2006, when they were replaced by bearer cheques of the second dollar due to high inflation (which escalated into hyperinflation in March 2007). Cheques (and later agro-cheques) of the second dollar were itself replaced by banknotes of the third dollar in August 2008, which were itself replaced by those of the fourth dollar in February 2009. The power-sharing government of Prime Minister Morgan Tsvangirai abandoned the Zimbabwean dollar in April 2009, and banknotes of the third and fourth dollars were demonetised in September 2015 after over 6 years of disuse. Zimbabwean banknotes were reintroduced in November 2016, initially in response to a shortage of hard currency.

The main feature on the front of Zimbabwean banknotes is an illustration of the Domboremari near Epworth – one of the many balancing rocks of Zimbabwe: the Domboremari also appeared on bearer and agro-cheques, as part of the Reserve Bank's logo. The back often shows the culture or landmarks of the country. Banknotes issued between September 2008 and April 2009 (for the third and fourth dollar) lacked modern security features, due to sanctions against the Zimbabwean government and the Reserve Bank at the time.

== History ==
The Zimbabwean dollar came into existence upon independence from the United Kingdom on 18 April 1980, replacing the Rhodesian dollar at par, but the first banknotes from the Reserve Bank of Zimbabwe (renamed from the Reserve Bank of Rhodesia) entered circulation on 15 April 1981, with the release of the $10 note: the Zimbabwean $2, $5 and $20 notes followed in stages, until 14 April 1982. From 1994 to 1997, the Reserve Bank issued a new series of notes ranging from $2 to $100, but the $2 note was later withdrawn and replaced by a coin in 1997. As rising inflation started to hurt the purchasing power of the first dollar, $500 and $1,000 notes were issued in 2001 and 2003 respectively, with enhanced anti-counterfeiting measures for the time.

In May 2003, the Reserve Bank allowed the Cargill Cotton Group to issue emergency bearer cheques to cotton farmers, via a Standard Chartered Zimbabwe branch in Harare: Cargill issued these cheques due to a shortage of money caused by high annual inflation, which according to The Herald, was around 269.2% in June 2003. The Reserve Bank later issued special traveller's cheques on 8 August 2003, with six denominations ranging from $1,000 to $100,000: the traveller's cheques were short-lived and unpopular, because they could only be used once, the user needed to present proof of identification when using the cheques, and the banks levied a commission fee on the use of the cheques.

The Reserve Bank eventually issued their own Bearer cheques on 26 September 2003, with denominations ranging from $5,000 to $20,000. These, and subsequent issues of the first and second dollars were time limited and lacked sophisticated anti-counterfeiting measures which were heavily used in many modern banknotes such as those of the Swiss Franc. In the first half of 2006 new denominations of $50,000 and $100,000 were issued, with the $1 million denomination being planned for September 2006; it was subsequently never issued. The time limits on the cheques were either ignored or extended by multiple decrees, making them all legal tender in practice until 21 August 2006.

On 1 August 2006 the banknotes of the second dollar (ZWN), with less elaborate designs, replaced those of the first dollar at the ratio of 1 000 to 1. The redenomination (codenamed Operation Sunrise) was heavily publicised under the banner Zero to Hero, but was also rapid and disorganised which resulted in many people being unable to convert their old Bearer cheques to new issues before the lapse date: Reserve Bank Governor Gideon Gono stated that 10 trillion ZWD in notes were not exchanged and had become "manure".

Further denominations ranging from $5,000 to $500 million were issued in the period between August 2006 and May 2008 as cent cheques quickly became outmoded. In the second quarter of 2008, special agro-cheques (agricultural cheques) were issued in denominations ranging from $5 billion to $100 billion as the currency exchange rate was floated. Since the functions were similar to Bearer cheques, it was in regular use as prices continue to rise. These cheques also carried time limits and limited security features. In the final months of the second dollar, the $200,000 cheque was the lowest legal tender denomination by decree, despite having its expiry date extended twice. The $100 million bearer cheque would have been the lowest legal tender denomination in circulation had the expiry dates of currency cheques been enforced without extension, with the $100 billion agro-cheque being the highest whether or not the $200,000 note was legal tender.

Munich-based security printers Giesecke & Devrient ceased providing banknote paper to the Reserve Bank on 1 July 2008 in response to an official request from the German government and widespread calls for sanctions; The Jura JSP software end-user licence, issued to the state-owned Fidelity Printers & Refiners was also terminated on 24 July 2008 for similar reasons although the official press statement quoted that it was de facto impossible to prevent the printers from using the software.

On 1 August 2008 the banknotes of the third dollar (ZWR), which were printed for the abandoned second phase of the 2006 redenomination, replaced the cheques of the second dollar at the ratio of 10 billion (10^{10}) to 1. The bearer and agro-cheques of the second dollar were phased out along with the smaller denominations of the third dollar on 1 January 2009. Despite the reform, the Reserve Bank issued several high-value denominations up to $100 trillion ($10^{14}) in the period between September 2008 to January 2009, (Note: The Reserve Bank of Zimbabwe issued 21 additional denominations between 1 September 2008 and 2 February 2009, ranging from $1,000 to $100 trillion. For details about those banknotes, see § Banknotes of the third dollar (ZWR).) which merely kept in similar pace with the cash rate instead of the black market rates.

On 2 February 2009, banknotes of the fourth dollar (ZWL) were introduced to replace those of the third dollar at the ratio of one trillion (10^{12}) to 1. It was originally envisaged that banknotes of the third dollar would stay legal tender until 30 June 2009, but all banknotes were withdrawn from circulation following the suspension of the Zimbabwe dollar on 12 April 2009. (Note: Currency exchange websites monitored the Interbank, black market and official exchange rates for a short time after the suspension of the dollar: for example, XE.com's mid-market rate for one US dollar was Z$363.07 on 2 August 2009.)

In 2019, regular Zimbabwean dollar notes were issued again and the use of foreign currency was banned, although the ban was lifted in March 2020 due to the COVID-19 pandemic.

== Banknotes of the first dollar (1981–2006) ==
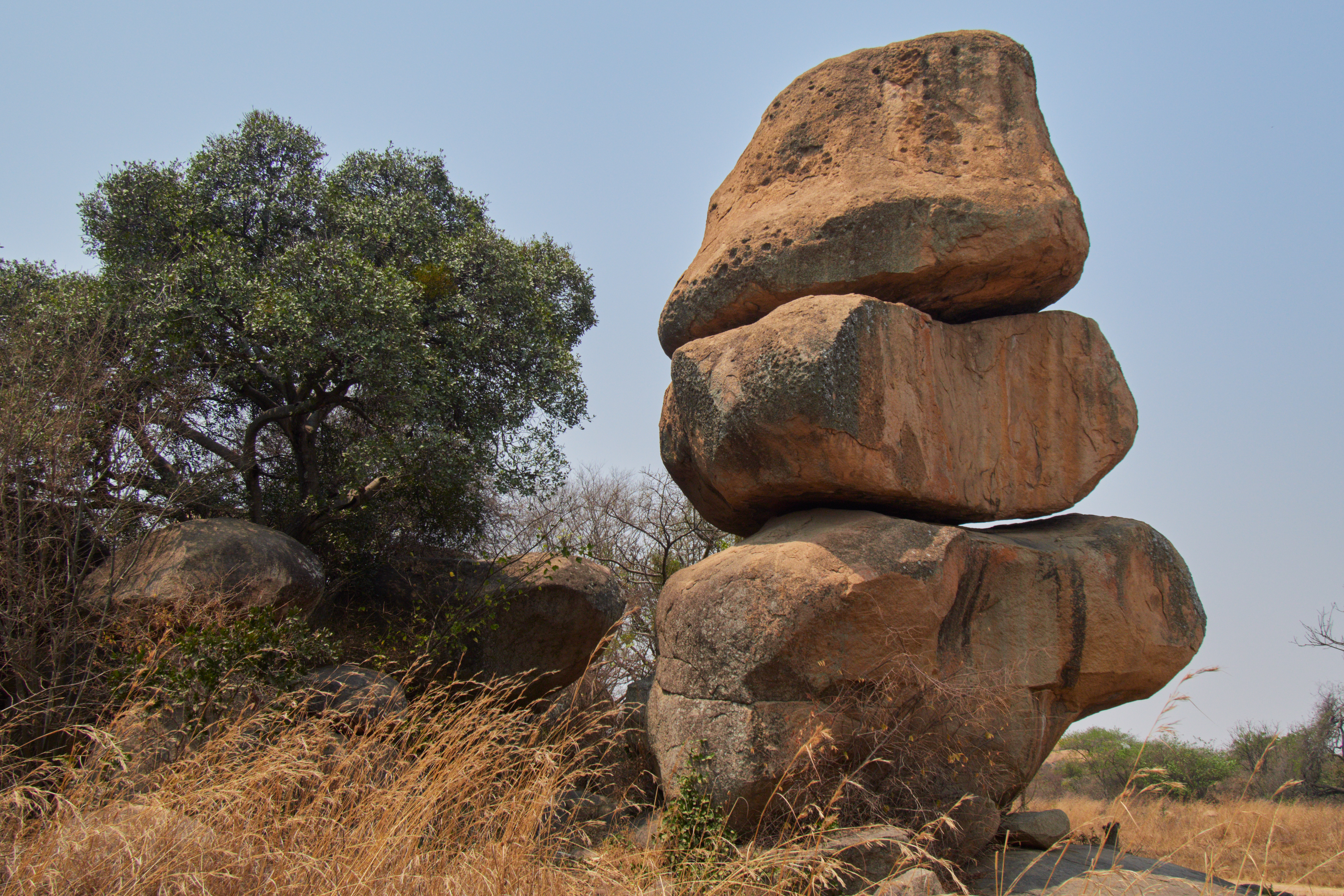
Domboremari, in the outskirts of Epworth

The obverse of the first two series of banknotes featured a dominant motif of the Domboremari, surrounded by trees: the notes also featured major landmarks and landscapes on either side, such as the Kariba Dam and fauna. When high inflation escalated at the end of the 20th century, the quality of the notes deteriorated as printing plates from previous issues were reused for printing emergency notes. Although sustained high inflation forced regular banknotes ($2 to $1,000) out of practical use, all banknotes and bearer cheques of the first dollar remained legal tender until the Reserve Bank demonetised them on 21 August 2006.

=== 1980 banknote series ===
The Reserve Bank of Zimbabwe prepared the first series of banknotes for the newly-independent country in 1980, and released them into circulation in stages, from 15 April 1981 to 14 April 1982. The 1980 series consisted of four denominations: $2, $5, $10 and $20 – and made extensive use of the guilloché technique, a security feature common on many banknotes from the 1980s. The watermark consisted of a profile view of the Zimbabwe Bird, but the final batches of $2 and $5 notes, both dated 1994, had a ¾ view of the bird with a longer neck. The colour scheme also changed from the Rhodesian notes: the $2 note changed from red to blue, $5 from brown to green, $10 from grey to red, and the $20 note that debuted with this series was navy blue.

Banknotes dated 1980 bore Salisbury as the name of Zimbabwe's capital, which renamed itself to Harare on 18 April 1982: $5, $10 and $20 notes dated 1982 and later bore the updated name, but early batches of $10 notes dated 1982 erroneously bore the capital's old name. There were no $2 notes dated 1982: those dated 1983 and later had the updated name of the capital. Notes dated 1980 and 1982 carried the signature of Desmond Krogh, the last governor of the Reserve Bank of Rhodesia from 1973, and the first of the Reserve Bank of Zimbabwe until 1983: notes dated 1983 had the signature of Kombo James Moyana (governor from 1983 to August 1993), and notes dated 1994 had the signature of Leonard Tsumba (August 1993 to 31 July 2003).

1980 series (Signatures: Dr. D.C. Krogh (1980 and 1982), K. Moyana (1983), L.L. Tsumba (1994); Capital: Salisbury, later Harare)
Pick No.	Image		Value	Dimensions	Main colour	Description			Date of		
Pick No.	Obverse	Reverse	Value	Dimensions	Main colour	Obverse	Reverse	Watermark	printing	issue	withdrawal
1a			$2	134 × 69 mm	Blue	Domboremari with trees, Cape buffalo, Salisbury as capital, Krogh as signature	Tigerfish, Kariba Dam	Zimbabwe Bird (profile angle, short neck)	1980	15 July 1981	21 August 2006
1b			$2	134 × 69 mm	Blue	Domboremari with trees, Cape buffalo, Harare as capital, Moyana as signature	Tigerfish, Kariba Dam	Zimbabwe Bird (profile angle, short neck)	1983	15 July 1981	21 August 2006
1c			$2	134 × 69 mm	Blue	Domboremari with trees, Cape buffalo, Harare as capital, Tsumba as signature	Tigerfish, Kariba Dam	Zimbabwe Bird (profile angle, short neck)	1994	15 July 1981	21 August 2006
1d			$2	134 × 69 mm	Blue	Domboremari with trees, Cape buffalo, Harare as capital, Tsumba as signature	Tigerfish, Kariba Dam	Zimbabwe Bird (¾ profile, medium neck)	1994	15 July 1981	21 August 2006
2a			$5	140 × 73 mm	Green	Domboremari with trees, zebra, Salisbury as capital, Krogh as signature	Farm workers in a village	Zimbabwe Bird (profile angle, short neck)	1980	14 October 1981	21 August 2006
2b			$5	140 × 73 mm	Green	Domboremari with trees, zebra, Harare as capital, Krogh as signature	Farm workers in a village	Zimbabwe Bird (profile angle, short neck)	1982	14 October 1981	21 August 2006
2c			$5	140 × 73 mm	Green	Domboremari with trees, zebra, Harare as capital, Moyana as signature	Farm workers in a village	Zimbabwe Bird (profile angle, short neck)	1983	14 October 1981	21 August 2006
2d			$5	140 × 73 mm	Green	Domboremari with trees, zebra, Harare as capital, Tsumba as signature	Farm workers in a village	Zimbabwe Bird (profile angle, short neck)	1994	14 October 1981	21 August 2006
2e			$5	140 × 73 mm	Green	Domboremari with trees, zebra, Harare as capital, Tsumba as signature	Farm workers in a village	Zimbabwe Bird (¾ profile, medium neck)	1994	14 October 1981	21 August 2006
3a			$10	146 × 77 mm	Red	Domboremari with trees, sable antelope, Salisbury as capital, Krogh as signature	Harare, Eternal Flame at the National Heroes' Acre	Zimbabwe Bird (profile angle, short neck)	1980	15 April 1981	21 August 2006
3b			$10	146 × 77 mm	Red	Domboremari with trees, sable antelope, Salisbury as capital (error), Krogh as signature	Harare, Eternal Flame at the National Heroes' Acre	Zimbabwe Bird (profile angle, short neck)	1982	15 April 1981	21 August 2006
3c			$10	146 × 77 mm	Red	Domboremari with trees, sable antelope, Harare as capital, Krogh as signature	Harare, Eternal Flame at the National Heroes' Acre	Zimbabwe Bird (profile angle, short neck)	1982	15 April 1981	21 August 2006
3d			$10	146 × 77 mm	Red	Domboremari with trees, sable antelope, Harare as capital, Moyana as signature	Harare, Eternal Flame at the National Heroes' Acre	Zimbabwe Bird (profile angle, short neck)	1983	15 April 1981	21 August 2006
3e			$10	146 × 77 mm	Red	Domboremari with trees, sable antelope, Harare as capital, Tsumba as signature	Harare, Eternal Flame at the National Heroes' Acre	Zimbabwe Bird (profile angle, short neck)	1994	15 April 1981	21 August 2006
4a			$20	152 × 81 mm	Navy blue	Domboremari with trees, giraffe, Salisbury as capital, Krogh as signature	African elephant, Victoria Falls	Zimbabwe Bird (profile angle, short neck)	1980	14 April 1982	21 August 2006
4b			$20	152 × 81 mm	Navy blue	Domboremari with trees, giraffe, Harare as capital, Krogh as signature	African elephant, Victoria Falls	Zimbabwe Bird (profile angle, short neck)	1982	14 April 1982	21 August 2006
4c			$20	152 × 81 mm	Navy blue	Domboremari with trees, giraffe, Harare as capital, Moyana as signature	African elephant, Victoria Falls	Zimbabwe Bird (profile angle, short neck)	1983	14 April 1982	21 August 2006
4d			$20	152 × 81 mm	Navy blue	Domboremari with trees, giraffe, Harare as capital, Tsumba as signature	African elephant, Victoria Falls	Zimbabwe Bird (profile angle, short neck)	1994	14 April 1982	21 August 2006
These images are to scale at 0.7 pixel per millimetre (18 pixel per inch). For table standards, see the banknote specification table.

=== 1994 banknote series ===
From 1994 to 1997, the Reserve Bank introduced the second series of Zimbabwe banknotes into circulation. Due to high inflation, which at the time peaked at 42.1% in 1992, the rollout began with two new denominations, $50 and $100. Other denominations followed in 1997, while the $2 note was replaced by a coin. Worsening high inflation, which reached 140.1% in 2002, caused the Reserve Bank to introduce the $500 note on 31 August 2001, and the $1,000 note on 1 October 2003.

The overall layout of the 1994 series was similar to the 1980 series, but the Domboremari moved to the left, and the animals moved to the other side, acting as a see-through register. The obverse also had a flower at centre, a solid element with a latent image of the letters "RBZ", and tactile marks for the visually impaired. The watermark of the Zimbabwe Bird had a long neck, while the security thread was demetalised with the letters "RBZ" and the denomination. The $500 and $1,000 note also had a holographic stripe, but the $500 note dropped the feature when the main colour changed from red to brown.

Almost all banknotes in the 1994 series had the signature of Leonard Tsumba: the signature of his successor, Gideon Gono, appeared on $500 notes dated 2004. Giesecke+Devrient also printed some of the $1,000 notes: the serial number prefixes were "WA" to "WM" for the G+D notes, and "WN" to "WU" for the Fidelity notes.

1994 series (Signatures: L.L. Tsumba, Dr. G. Gono ($500 notes from 2004 only); Capital: Harare)
Pick No.	Image		Value	Dimensions	Main colour	Description			Date of		
Pick No.	Obverse	Reverse	Value	Dimensions	Main colour	Obverse	Reverse	Watermark	printing	issue	withdrawal
5a			$5	139 × 68 mm	Pink	Domboremari with trees, royal dissotis (Dissotis princeps), greater kudus	Mount Nyangani (lithography), greater kudus (mirrored)	Zimbabwe Bird (¾ profile, long neck)	1997	1997	21 August 2006
5b			$5	139 × 68 mm	Pink	Domboremari with trees, royal dissotis (Dissotis princeps), greater kudus	Mount Nyangani (intaglio), greater kudus (mirrored)	Zimbabwe Bird (¾ profile, long neck)	1997	1997	21 August 2006
6			$10	142 × 70 mm	Teal	Domboremari with trees, Sabi star (Adenium obesum), sable antelopes	Chilojo Cliffs with birds, sable antelopes (mirrored)	Zimbabwe Bird (¾ profile, long neck)	1997	1997	21 August 2006
7			$20	145 × 71 mm	Blue	Domboremari with trees, roadside pimpernel (Tricliceras longepedunculatum), Cape buffaloes	Victoria Falls, Cape buffaloes (mirrored)	Zimbabwe Bird (¾ profile, long neck)	1997	1997	21 August 2006
8			$50	148 × 75 mm	Olive green	Domboremari with trees, flame lily (Gloriosa superba), rhinoceros	Great Zimbabwe ruins, Zimbabwe Bird, rhinoceros (mirrored)	Zimbabwe Bird (¾ profile, long neck)	1994	March 1994	21 August 2006
9			$100	151 × 76 mm	Purple	Domboremari with trees, Protea, African elephants	Kariba Dam, African elephants (mirrored)	Zimbabwe Bird (¾ profile, long neck)	1995	January 1995	21 August 2006
10			$500	154 × 78 mm	Red	Domboremari with trees, holographic stripe, bitter apple (Solanum campylacanthum), zebras	Hwange Power Station, zebras (mirrored)	Zimbabwe Bird (¾ profile, long neck) and "500"	2001	31 August 2001	21 August 2006
11			$500	154 × 78 mm	Brown	Domboremari with trees, bitter apple (Solanum campylacanthum), zebras	Hwange Power Station, zebras (mirrored)	Zimbabwe Bird (¾ profile, long neck) and "500"	2003; 2004	26 September 2003	21 August 2006
12			$1,000	154 × 78 mm	Navy blue	Domboremari with trees, holographic stripe, Bauhinia, giraffes	Three African elephants, giraffes (mirrored)	Zimbabwe Bird (¾ profile, long neck) and "1000"	2003	1 October 2003	21 August 2006
These images are to scale at 0.7 pixel per millimetre (18 pixel per inch). For table standards, see the banknote specification table.

=== Cargill bearer cheques ===
In May 2003, the Reserve Bank allowed the Cargill Cotton Group to issue emergency bearer cheques to cotton farmers, via a Standard Chartered Zimbabwe branch in Harare: Cargill issued these cheques due to a shortage of money caused by high annual inflation, which according to The Herald, was around 269.2% in June 2003.

The Cargill bearer cheques had the same legal status as regular banknotes, and were valid for six months from the date of issue, making them the first Zimbabwean currency notes with an expiry date. Typocrafters (a Zimpapers subsidiary) printed these bearer cheques, which carried the signature of Cargill's finance director Priscilla Mutenbwa, and operations director Stephen Newton-Howes.

Cargill bearer cheques (Signatures: P.P. Mutenbwa and S.J. Newton-Howes; 85 Robert Mugabe Road Branch, Harare)
Pick No.	Value	Dimensions	Main colour	Description			Date of	
Pick No.	Value	Dimensions	Main colour	Obverse	Reverse	Watermark	issue	expiry
13a	$5,000	220 × 92 mm	Green	Patterned background	None	Cotton plant (Gossypium)	1 June 2003	30 November 2003
13b	$5,000	220 × 92 mm	Green	Patterned background	None	Cotton plant (Gossypium)	1 September 2003	31 March 2004
14a	$10,000	220 × 92 mm	Blue	Patterned background	None	Cotton plant (Gossypium)	1 May 2003	31 October 2003
14b	$10,000	220 × 92 mm	Blue	Patterned background	None	Cotton plant (Gossypium)	1 September 2003	31 March 2004
24	$10,000	205 × 92 mm	Blue	Patterned background, Cargill Cotton logo	None	"Citation"	1 April 2004	30 September 2004
25	$20,000	205 × 92 mm	Green	Patterned background, Cargill Cotton logo	None	"Citation"	1 April 2004	30 September 2004
26	$50,000	205 × 92 mm	Orange	Patterned background, Cargill Cotton logo	None	"Citation"	1 April 2004	30 September 2004
27	$100,000	205 × 92 mm	Red	Patterned background, Cargill Cotton logo	None	"Citation"	1 April 2004	30 September 2004
For table standards, see the banknote specification table.

=== 2003 bearer cheque series ===
The Reserve Bank eventually issued their own bearer cheques: the $5,000, $10,000 and $20,000 cheques entered circulation on 26 September 2003, and the $50,000 and $100,000 cheques on 1 October 2005. The cheques also had an expiry date, and circulated until the demonetisation of the first dollar, on 21 August 2006.

The bearer cheques used watermarked security paper meant for the $50 banknote from 1994: the $5,000, $10,000 and $20,000 cheques also reused most of the underprint from that denomination. The $50,000 and $100,000 cheques used a modified underprint on the obverse, and a single-colour view of Victoria Falls on the reverse. Cheques dated 15 September 2003 bear the signature of the acting governor Charles Chikaura, and the remainder bear the signature of Dr. Gideon Gono, who became governor on 1 December 2003.

2003 bearer cheque series (Signatures: C. Chikaura (acting, to December 2003), Dr. G. Gono (from December 2003); Capital: Harare)
Pick No.	Image		Value	Dimensions	Main colour	Description			Date of			
Pick No.	Obverse	Reverse	Value	Dimensions	Main colour	Obverse	Reverse	Watermark	printing	issue	expiry	withdrawal
21a			$5,000	148 × 75 mm	Blue	Reserve Bank seal, flame lily (Gloriosa superba), guilloché border	Underprint from the $50 note, guilloché border	Zimbabwe Bird (¾ profile, long neck)	15 September 2003	26 September 2003	31 January 2004	21 August 2006
21b			$5,000	148 × 75 mm	Blue	Reserve Bank seal, flame lily (Gloriosa superba), guilloché border	Underprint from the $50 note, guilloché border	Zimbabwe Bird (¾ profile, long neck)	15 September 2003	26 September 2003	30 June 2004	21 August 2006
21c 21d			$5,000	148 × 75 mm	Blue	Reserve Bank seal, flame lily (Gloriosa superba), guilloché border	Underprint from the $50 note, guilloché border	Zimbabwe Bird (¾ profile, long neck) and "RBZ"	1 December 2003	26 September 2003	31 December 2004	21 August 2006
21e			$5,000	148 × 75 mm	Blue	Reserve Bank seal, flame lily (Gloriosa superba), guilloché border	Underprint from the $50 note, guilloché border	Zimbabwe Bird (¾ profile, long neck) and "RBZ"	1 December 2003	26 September 2003	31 December 2005	21 August 2006
22a			$10,000	148 × 75 mm	Red	Reserve Bank seal, flame lily (Gloriosa superba), guilloché border	Underprint from the $50 note, guilloché border	Zimbabwe Bird (¾ profile, long neck)	15 September 2003	26 September 2003	31 January 2004	21 August 2006
22b			$10,000	148 × 75 mm	Red	Reserve Bank seal, flame lily (Gloriosa superba), guilloché border	Underprint from the $50 note, guilloché border	Zimbabwe Bird (¾ profile, long neck)	15 September 2003	26 September 2003	30 June 2004	21 August 2006
22c 22d			$10,000	148 × 75 mm	Red	Reserve Bank seal, flame lily (Gloriosa superba), guilloché border	Underprint from the $50 note, guilloché border	Zimbabwe Bird (¾ profile, long neck) and "RBZ"	1 December 2003	26 September 2003	31 December 2004	21 August 2006
22e			$10,000	148 × 75 mm	Red	Reserve Bank seal, flame lily (Gloriosa superba), guilloché border	Underprint from the $50 note, guilloché border	Zimbabwe Bird (¾ profile, long neck) and "RBZ"	1 December 2003	26 September 2003	31 December 2005	21 August 2006
23a			$20,000	148 × 75 mm	Brown	Reserve Bank seal, flame lily (Gloriosa superba), guilloché border	Underprint from the $50 note, guilloché border	Zimbabwe Bird (¾ profile, long neck)	15 September 2003	26 September 2003	31 January 2004	21 August 2006
23b			$20,000	148 × 75 mm	Brown	Reserve Bank seal, flame lily (Gloriosa superba), guilloché border	Underprint from the $50 note, guilloché border	Zimbabwe Bird (¾ profile, long neck)	15 September 2003	26 September 2003	30 June 2004	21 August 2006
23c			$20,000	148 × 75 mm	Brown	Reserve Bank seal, flame lily (Gloriosa superba), guilloché border	Underprint from the $50 note, guilloché border	Zimbabwe Bird (¾ profile, long neck)	1 December 2003	26 September 2003	31 December 2004	21 August 2006
23d			$20,000	148 × 75 mm	Brown	Reserve Bank seal, flame lily (Gloriosa superba), guilloché border	Underprint from the $50 note, guilloché border	Zimbabwe Bird (¾ profile, long neck) and "RBZ"	1 December 2003	26 September 2003	31 December 2004	21 August 2006
23e			$20,000	148 × 75 mm	Brown	Reserve Bank seal, flame lily (Gloriosa superba), guilloché border	Underprint from the $50 note, guilloché border	Zimbabwe Bird (¾ profile, long neck) and "RBZ"	1 December 2003	26 September 2003	31 December 2005	21 August 2006
28			$50,000	148 × 74 mm	Purple	Reserve Bank seal, flame lily (Gloriosa superba), guilloché border	Victoria Falls, guilloché border	Zimbabwe Bird (¾ profile, long neck) and "RBZ"	1 October 2005	1 October 2005	31 December 2006	21 August 2006
29; 30			$50,000	148 × 74 mm	Purple	Reserve Bank seal, flame lily (Gloriosa superba), guilloché border	Victoria Falls, guilloché border	Zimbabwe Bird (¾ profile, long neck) and "RBZ"	1 February 2006	1 October 2005	31 December 2006	21 August 2006
31			$100,000	148 × 74 mm	Green	Reserve Bank seal, flame lily (Gloriosa superba), guilloché border	Victoria Falls, guilloché border	Zimbabwe Bird (¾ profile, long neck) and "RBZ"	1 October 2005	1 October 2005	31 December 2006	21 August 2006
32			$100,000	148 × 74 mm	Green	Reserve Bank seal, flame lily (Gloriosa superba), guilloché border	Victoria Falls, guilloché border	Zimbabwe Bird (¾ profile, long neck) and "RBZ"	1 June 2006	1 October 2005	31 December 2006	21 August 2006
These images are to scale at 0.7 pixel per millimetre (18 pixel per inch). For table standards, see the banknote specification table.

== Banknotes of the second dollar (2006–2008) ==
The Zimbabwean dollar was first redenominated on 1 August 2006 under a currency reform campaign codenamed Operation Sunrise and involving the motto Zero to Hero. New-style bearer cheques of the second dollar (ISO 4217:ZWN) was introduced and replaced those of the first dollar (ZWD) at the ratio of 1 000 to 1.

The change over process was given at short notice and was also rapid because all issues prior to the August 2006 series were to be demonetised and rendered worthless on 21 August 2006. Poor communications meant that many civilians of Zimbabwe were unable to convert old bearer cheques to new ones before the deadline.

=== 2006, 2007 and 2008 Bearer cheque series ===
The 2006 bearer cheque series was put into circulation on 1 August 2006 and initially consisted of 14 denominations, ranging from 1¢ to $100,000. The cheques were signed by Dr. Gideon Gono and were set to expire on 31 July 2007, except for the $100 and $500 cheques, which were initially due to expire on 31 December 2007, but later extended to 31 July 2008. The $5 denomination was also issued, despite not being widely publicised in the changeover campaign.

Two variations that were issued for the $10,000 and $100,000 denominations are recognised in the Standard Catalog of World Paper Money: the difference between them was the use of digit grouping. Cheques with the denomination expressed as '10000' or '100000' bear serial numbers with the (scarce) prefix AA, while notes with prefixes AB onwards is expressed as '10000' or '100000'.

2006 bearer cheque series (Signature: Dr. G. Gono; Capital: Harare)
Pick No.	Image		Value	Dimensions	Main colour	Description			Date of	
Pick No.	Obverse	Reverse	Value	Dimensions	Main colour	Obverse	Reverse	Watermark	issue	withdrawal
33			1¢	154 × 78 mm	Red	Reserve Bank seal, value	Value within ring	Zimbabwe Bird (long neck, ¾ profile) and "500"	1 August 2006	31 July 2007
34			5¢	154 × 78 mm	Green	Reserve Bank seal, value	Value within ring	Zimbabwe Bird (long neck, ¾ profile) and "500"	1 August 2006	31 July 2007
35			10¢	154 × 78 mm	Brown	Reserve Bank seal, value	Value within ring	Zimbabwe Bird (long neck, ¾ profile) and "500"	1 August 2006	31 July 2007
36			50¢	154 × 78 mm	Grey	Reserve Bank seal, value	Value within ring	Zimbabwe Bird (long neck, ¾ profile) and "500"	1 August 2006	31 July 2007
37			$1	148 × 74 mm	Blue	Reserve Bank seal, value	Farm workers in a village	Zimbabwe Bird (long neck, ¾ profile) and "RBZ"	1 August 2006	31 July 2007
38			$5	148 × 74 mm	Green on tan	Reserve Bank seal, value	Harare, Eternal Flame at the National Heroes' Acre	Zimbabwe Bird (long neck, ¾ profile) and "RBZ"	1 August 2006	31 July 2007
39			$10	148 × 74 mm	Red	Reserve Bank seal, value	Farm workers in a village	Zimbabwe Bird (long neck, ¾ profile) and "RBZ"	1 August 2006	31 July 2007
40			$20	148 × 74 mm	Orange	Reserve Bank seal, value	Victoria Falls	Zimbabwe Bird (long neck, ¾ profile) and "RBZ"	1 August 2006	31 July 2007
41			$50	148 × 74 mm	Purple	Reserve Bank seal, value	Victoria Falls	Zimbabwe Bird (long neck, ¾ profile) and "RBZ"	1 August 2006	31 July 2007
42			$100	148 × 74 mm	Green	Reserve Bank seal, value	Mount Nyangani	Zimbabwe Bird (long neck, ¾ profile) and "RBZ"	1 August 2006	31 July 2008 (originally 31 December 2007)
43			$500	148 × 74 mm	Olive green	Reserve Bank seal, value	Tigerfish, Kariba Dam	Zimbabwe Bird (long neck, ¾ profile) and "RBZ"	1 August 2006	31 July 2008 (originally 31 December 2007)
44			$1,000	148 × 74 mm	Brown	Reserve Bank seal, value	Mount Nyangani	Zimbabwe Bird (long neck, ¾ profile) and "RBZ"	1 August 2006	31 July 2007
46a			$10,000	148 × 74 mm	Indigo	Reserve Bank emblem, value without digit separation	Great Zimbabwe ruins, value expressed as obverse	Zimbabwe Bird (long neck, ¾ profile) and "RBZ"	1 August 2006	31 July 2007
46b			$10,000	148 × 74 mm	Indigo	Reserve Bank emblem, value with digit separation	Great Zimbabwe ruins, value expressed as obverse	Zimbabwe Bird (long neck, ¾ profile) and "RBZ"	1 August 2006	31 July 2007
48a			$100,000	148 × 74 mm	Teal	Reserve Bank emblem, value without digit separation	Great Zimbabwe ruins, value expressed as obverse	Zimbabwe Bird (long neck, ¾ profile) and "RBZ"	1 August 2006	31 July 2007
48b			$100,000	148 × 74 mm	Teal	Reserve Bank emblem, value with digit separation	Great Zimbabwe ruins, value expressed as obverse	Zimbabwe Bird (long neck, ¾ profile) and "RBZ"	1 August 2006	31 July 2007
These images are to scale at 0.7 pixel per millimetre (18 pixel per inch). For table standards, see the banknote specification table.

The 2007 bearer cheque series was first issued on 2 March 2007 with the introduction of $5,000 and $50,000 cheques to act as intermediary denominations between the $1,000, $10,000 and $100,000 cheques respectively. As inflation turned into hyperinflation in March 2007 (under Cagan's definition), the $200,000 bearer cheque was also introduced on 1 August 2007, followed by the joint introduction of the $250,000, $500,000, and $750,000 denominations on 20 December 2007. The $200,000 bearer cheque had its date of lapse extended twice up to 31 December 2008.

The $50,000 denomination was the first denomination to use the Optically Variable Ink technique, on the value positioned at the top right of the obverse. The $750,000 denomination of the December 2007 series was the only note out of all cheques of the second dollar to bear a holographic strip, as the cheque was printed on paper that was prepared for the $1,000 notes of the first dollar (Pick No. 12).

2007 bearer cheque series (Signature: Dr. G. Gono; Capital: Harare)
Pick No.	Image		Value	Dimensions	Main colour	Description			Date of	
Pick No.	Obverse	Reverse	Value	Dimensions	Main colour	Obverse	Reverse	Watermark	issue	withdrawal
45			$5,000	148 × 74 mm	Blue	Reserve Bank seal, value	Kariba Dam	Zimbabwe Bird (long neck, ¾ profile) and "RBZ"	1 February 2007	31 July 2008 (originally 31 July 2007)
47			$50,000	148 × 74 mm	Red	Reserve Bank seal, value in OVI ink	African elephant, Victoria Falls	Zimbabwe Bird (long neck, ¾ profile) and "RBZ"	1 March 2007	31 July 2008 (originally 31 July 2007)
49			$200,000	148 × 74 mm	Pink	Reserve Bank seal, value	Hwange Power Station	Zimbabwe Bird (long neck, ¾ profile) and "RBZ"	1 August 2007	31 December 2008 (originally 30 June 2008)
50			$250,000	148 × 74 mm	Olive green	Reserve Bank seal, value	Great Zimbabwe ruins	Zimbabwe Bird (long neck, ¾ profile) and "RBZ"	20 December 2007	30 June 2008
51			$500,000	148 × 74 mm	Green	Reserve Bank seal, value	Three African elephants	Zimbabwe Bird (long neck, ¾ profile) and "RBZ"	20 December 2007	30 June 2008
52			$750,000	154 × 78 mm	Indigo	Reserve Bank seal, value and hologram	African elephant, Victoria Falls	Zimbabwe Bird (long neck, ¾ profile) and "1000"	31 December 2007	30 June 2008
These images are to scale at 0.7 pixel per millimetre (18 pixel per inch). For table standards, see the banknote specification table.

The circulation of the 2008 bearer cheque series commenced on 18 January 2008 with three denominations ranging from $1 million to $10 million, and concluded with the issue of the $500 million bearer cheque on 15 May 2008. Three denominations of the 2008 series remained legal tender at the ratio of 10 billion (10^{10}) to 1 until being demonetised on 31 December 2008.

There are two variants of the $10 million denomination, the primary difference being the typeface and size of the serial number. Those with slightly larger serial numbers bear the prefix DA. The $25 million banknote is larger in dimension out of the rest of the 2008 series.

2008 bearer cheque series (Signature: Dr. G. Gono; Capital: Harare)
Pick No.	Image		Value	Dimensions	Main colour	Description			Date of	
Pick No.	Obverse	Reverse	Value	Dimensions	Main colour	Obverse	Reverse	Watermark	issue	withdrawal
53			$1 million	148 × 74 mm	Brown	Reserve Bank seal, value	Farm workers in a village	Zimbabwe Bird (¾ profile) and "RBZ"	18 January 2008	30 June 2008
54			$5 million	148 × 74 mm	Blue	Reserve Bank seal, value	Mount Nyangani	Zimbabwe Bird (¾ profile) and "RBZ"	18 January 2008	30 June 2008
55a/55b			$10 million	148 × 74 mm	Red	Reserve Bank seal, value	Tigerfish, Kariba Dam	Zimbabwe Bird (¾ profile) and "RBZ"	18 January 2008	30 June 2008
56			$25 million	154 × 78 mm	Teal	Reserve Bank seal, value	Harare, Eternal Flame at the National Heroes' Acre	Zimbabwe Bird (¾ profile) and "500"	4 April 2008	30 June 2008
57			$50 million	148 × 74 mm	Purple	Reserve Bank seal, value	Three African elephants	Zimbabwe Bird (¾ profile) and "RBZ"	4 April 2008	30 June 2008
58			$100 million	148 × 74 mm	Green	Reserve Bank seal, value	Farm workers in a village	Zimbabwe Bird (¾ profile) and "RBZ"	6 May 2008	31 December 2008
59			$250 million	148 × 74 mm	Blue	Reserve Bank seal, value	African elephant, Victoria Falls	Zimbabwe Bird (¾ profile) and "RBZ"	6 May 2008	31 December 2008
60			$500 million	148 × 74 mm	Red	Reserve Bank seal, value	Tigerfish, Kariba Dam	Zimbabwe Bird (¾ profile) and "RBZ"	15 May 2008	31 December 2008
These images are to scale at 0.7 pixel per millimetre (18 pixel per inch). For table standards, see the banknote specification table.

=== Special agro-cheques ===
The Reserve Bank circulated special agro-cheques ("agro" being an abbreviation of "agricultural"), from 15 May to 31 July 2008. They had a different design, and they were intended for use only by farmers: however, Zimbabweans treated them as regular money, because of the continued hyperinflation, and their similar function to bearer cheques. The Reserve Bank demonetised both agro- and bearer cheques on 31 December 2009, following the introduction of the third dollar.

The four denominations in this series are not the same by dimensions as the $25 billion note used different paper from the 500 ZWD banknote of 2001. Until the release of the $100 trillion in January 2009, the $100 billion agro-cheque was the second highest denominated banknote to enter circulation after the Cold War, after the 500 billion dinar note of the Yugoslav dinar.

Special agro-cheques, 2008 (Signature: Dr. G. Gono; Capital: Harare)
Pick No.	Image		Value	Dimensions	Main colour	Description			Date of	
Pick No.	Obverse	Reverse	Value	Dimensions	Main colour	Obverse	Reverse	Watermark	issue	withdrawal
61			$5 billion ($5×10^{9})	148 × 74 mm	Purple	Reserve Bank seal, value (in billions), giraffe	Grain silos, giraffe (mirrored)	Zimbabwe Bird (¾ profile) and "RBZ"	15 May 2008	31 December 2008
62			$25 billion ($2.5×10^{10})	154 × 78 mm	Green	Reserve Bank seal, value (in billions), giraffe	Grain silos, giraffe (mirrored)	Zimbabwe Bird (¾ profile) and "500"	15 May 2008	31 December 2008
63			$50 billion ($5×10^{10})	148 × 74 mm	Brown	Reserve Bank seal, value (in billions), giraffe	Grain silos, giraffe (mirrored)	Zimbabwe Bird (¾ profile) and "RBZ"	15 May 2008	31 December 2008
64			$100 billion ($10^{11})	148 × 74 mm	Blue	Reserve Bank seal, value (in billions), giraffe	Grain silos, giraffe (mirrored)	Zimbabwe Bird (¾ profile) and "RBZ"	1 July 2008	31 December 2008
These images are to scale at 0.7 pixel per millimetre (18 pixel per inch). For table standards, see the banknote specification table.

== Banknotes of the third dollar (2008–2009) ==
=== 2007 banknote issues ===
Between July and December 2006, the Reserve Bank prepared a new series of banknotes dated 2007, for the abandoned second phase of Operation Sunrise: the $1–$500 notes were eventually put into circulation on 1 August 2008, when the third dollar was introduced; the $1,000 notes followed on 17 September 2008. The notes featured the Domboremari on the obverse, two scenes on the reverse, and the Zimbabwe Bird as the watermark. There were extra security features as opposed to previous issues, including a windowed security thread, see-through register numeral, and a system of recognition marks for the partially sighted; the $100, $500 and $1,000 notes had a holographic security thread and the value in optically variable ink.

2007 series (Signature: Dr. G. Gono; Capital: Harare)
Pick No.	Image		Value	Dimensions	Main colour	Description			Date of		
Pick No.	Obverse	Reverse	Value	Dimensions	Main colour	Obverse	Reverse	Watermark	printing	issue	withdrawal
65			$1	134 × 68 mm	Claret	Domboremari with trees	Victoria Falls, Cape buffalo	Zimbabwe Bird and "1"	2007	1 August 2008	30 September 2015
66			$5	138 × 68 mm	Brown	Domboremari with trees	Kariba Dam, African elephant	Zimbabwe Bird and "5"	2007	1 August 2008	30 September 2015
67			$10	142 × 70 mm	Green	Domboremari with trees	Farm tractor, grain silos	Zimbabwe Bird and "10"	2007	1 August 2008	30 September 2015
68			$20	145 × 72 mm	Red	Domboremari with trees	Tailings, miner with jackhammer	Zimbabwe Bird and "20"	2007	1 August 2008	30 September 2015
69			$100	149 × 74 mm	Blue	Domboremari with trees	Zimbabwe Aloe, Great Zimbabwe ruins	Zimbabwe Bird and "100"	2007	1 August 2008	30 September 2015
70			$500	150 × 75 mm	Purple	Domboremari with trees	Milking farm, cattle	Zimbabwe Bird and "500"	2007	1 August 2008	30 September 2015
71			$1,000	153 × 76 mm	Orange	Domboremari with trees	Parliament House and St Mary's Cathedral, New Reserve Bank Tower	Zimbabwe Bird and "1000"	2007	17 September 2008	30 September 2015
These images are to scale at 0.7 pixel per millimetre (18 pixel per inch). For table standards, see the banknote specification table.

=== 2008 banknote issues ===
The 2008 banknote series circulated from 29 September 2008 to 12 April 2009. The series demonstrated the intensity of hyperinflation during the period as the highest denomination increased from $1,000 to $100 trillion ($10^{14}) by January 2009, the latter being the largest denomination issued by the Reserve Bank. (Note: The $100 trillion ($10^{14}) banknote (Pick No. 91) is the largest denomination ever issued by the Reserve Bank of Zimbabwe and is accepted by most numismatists as a banknote with the most zeroes ever shown in the design. Before 16 January 2009 the 500 billion dinar (5×10^{11}) banknote of Yugoslavia (Pick No. 137) held such status. However, the Guinness World Records recognises the Hungarian one billion b.-pengő (10^{21}) banknote (Pick No. 137) as the world's largest denomination, although the 100 million b.-pengő (10^{20}) (Pick No. 136) was the largest denomination to be issued.) The first issues of the series were the $10,000 and $20,000 denominations. These were followed by the following denominations:

- $50,000 (13 October 2008)
- $100,000, $500,000 and $1 million (3 November 2008)
- $10 million, $50 million and $100 million (4 December 2008)
- $200 million and $500 million (12 December 2008)
- $1 billion, $5 billion and $10 billion notes (19 December 2008)
- $20 billion and $50 billion notes (12 January 2009)
- $10 trillion, $20 trillion, $50 trillion and $100 trillion (16 January 2009)

The large number of denominations issued in late-2008 as well as the suspension of paper supply by Giesecke+Devrient affected the Reserve Bank's ability to maintain the quality of the banknotes. Later denominations copied design features from the original 2007 banknote series and lacked many modern security features that banknotes of major currencies (such as the Canadian dollar) relied on. The notes denominated from $20,000 to $500,000 and then from $10 million onwards used non-watermarked paper, whilst the $500 million notes were printed on pure cotton. A silhouette of the Zimbabwe Bird in optically variable ink was used in such notes to compensate for this, but the iridescent strip was dropped for higher denominations. The $10,000 and $1 million notes reused paper for the $1,000 notes (Pick no. 71), thereby carrying the embedded holographic thread and watermark. Two types of paper (regular and lined) were used on $20,000, $50,000 and $500,000 banknotes.

2008 series (Signature: Dr. G. Gono; Capital: Harare)
Pick No.	Image		Value	Dimensions	Main colour	Description			Date of		
Pick No.	Obverse	Reverse	Value	Dimensions	Main colour	Obverse	Reverse	Watermark	printing	issue	withdrawal
72			$10,000	153 × 76 mm	Burgundy	Domboremari with trees	Combine harvester, tractor	Zimbabwe Bird and "1000"	2008	29 September 2008	30 September 2015
73a			$20,000	148 × 74 mm	Brown	Domboremari with trees	Victoria Falls, Kariba Dam	None	2008	29 September 2008	30 September 2015
73b			$20,000	148 × 74 mm	Brown	Domboremari with trees	Victoria Falls, Kariba Dam	Horizontal lines	2008	29 September 2008	30 September 2015
74a			$50,000	148 × 74 mm	Green	Domboremari with trees	Farm tractor, miner with jackhammer	None	2008	13 October 2008	30 September 2015
74b			$50,000	148 × 74 mm	Green	Domboremari with trees	Farm tractor, miner with jackhammer	Horizontal lines	2008	13 October 2008	30 September 2015
75			$100,000	148 × 74 mm	Indigo	Domboremari with trees	Cape buffalo, African elephant	None	2008	5 November 2008	30 September 2015
76a			$500,000	148 × 74 mm	Olive green	Domboremari with trees	Zimbabwe Aloe, milking farm	None	2008	5 November 2008	30 September 2015
76b			$500,000	148 × 74 mm	Olive green	Domboremari with trees	Zimbabwe Aloe, milking farm	Horizontal lines	2008	5 November 2008	30 September 2015
77			$1 million	153 × 76 mm	Blue	Domboremari with trees	Great Zimbabwe ruins, cattle	Zimbabwe Bird and "1000"	2008	5 November 2008	30 September 2015
78			$10 million	148 × 74 mm	Blue	Domboremari with trees	Parliament House and St Mary's Cathedral, Great Zimbabwe ruins	None	2008	4 December 2008	30 September 2015
79			$50 million	148 × 74 mm	Teal	Domboremari with trees	Cape buffalo, Great Zimbabwe ruins	None	2008	4 December 2008	30 September 2015
80			$100 million	148 × 74 mm	Red	Domboremari with trees	Tailings, grain silos	None	2008	4 December 2008	30 September 2015
81			$200 million	148 × 74 mm	Brown	Domboremari with trees	Parliament House and St Mary's Cathedral, Tomb of the Unknown Soldier at the National Heroes' Acre	None	2008	12 December 2008	30 September 2015
82			$500 million	148 × 74 mm	Purple	Domboremari with trees	Milking farm, miner with jackhammer	None	2008	12 December 2008	30 September 2015
83			$1 billion ($10^{9})	148 × 74 mm	Green	Domboremari with trees	Zimbabwe Aloe, African elephant	None	2008	19 December 2008	30 September 2015
84			$5 billion ($5×10^{9})	148 × 74 mm	Pink	Domboremari with trees	Farm tractor, milking farm	None	2008	19 December 2008	30 September 2015
85			$10 billion ($10^{10})	148 × 74 mm	Indigo	Domboremari with trees	Kariba Dam, miner with jackhammer	None	2008	19 December 2008	30 September 2015
86			$20 billion ($2×10^{10})	148 × 74 mm	Olive	Domboremari with trees	Great Zimbabwe ruins, Zimbabwe Aloe	None	2008	12 January 2009	30 September 2015
87			$50 billion ($5×10^{10})	148 × 74 mm	Orange	Domboremari with trees	Great Zimbabwe ruins, New Reserve Bank Tower	None	2008	12 January 2009	30 September 2015
88			$10 trillion ($10^{13})	148 × 74 mm	Lime green	Domboremari with trees	New Reserve Bank Tower, Great Zimbabwe ruins	None	2008	16 January 2009	30 September 2015
89			$20 trillion ($2×10^{13})	148 × 74 mm	Red	Domboremari with trees	Miner with jackhammer, grain silos	None	2008	16 January 2009	30 September 2015
90			$50 trillion ($5×10^{13})	148 × 74 mm	Green	Domboremari with trees	Kariba Dam, African elephant	None	2008	16 January 2009	30 September 2015
91			$100 trillion ($10^{14})	148 × 74 mm	Blue	Domboremari with trees	Victoria Falls, Cape buffalo	None	2008	16 January 2009	30 September 2015
These images are to scale at 0.7 pixel per millimetre (18 pixel per inch). For table standards, see the banknote specification table.

== Banknotes of the fourth dollar (2009) ==
On 2 February 2009, the Reserve Bank introduced banknotes of the fourth dollar, equal to one trillion (1,000,000,000,000 or 10^{12}) third dollars: the Reserve Bank meant to have notes of the third dollar co-circulate with those of the fourth dollar until 30 June 2009, but the power-sharing government of Prime Minister Morgan Tsvangirai instead suspended the Zimbabwean dollar entirely on 12 April 2009. The notes, along with those of the third dollar, were eventually demonetised on 30 September 2015, after 6 years and 171 days of disuse.

The banknotes of the fourth dollar consisted of seven denominations from $1 to $500, reusing elements from earlier issues. Security features were similar to the emergency issues of the third dollar, which replaced the watermark and the windowed security thread with an iridescent strip and the Zimbabwe Bird in optically variable ink: a series of triangles on the right edge acted as a registration device.

2009 series (Signature: Dr. G. Gono; Capital: Harare)
Pick No.	Image		Value	Dimensions	Main colour	Description			Date of		
Pick No.	Obverse	Reverse	Value	Dimensions	Main colour	Obverse	Reverse	Watermark	printing	issue	withdrawal
92			$1	148 × 74 mm	Blue	Domboremari with trees	Farm workers in a village	None	2009	2 February 2009	30 September 2015
93			$5	148 × 74 mm	Green on tan	Domboremari with trees	Tigerfish, Kariba Dam	None	2009	2 February 2009	30 September 2015
94			$10	148 × 74 mm	Red	Domboremari with trees	Great Zimbabwe ruins	None	2009	2 February 2009	30 September 2015
95			$20	148 × 74 mm	Indigo	Domboremari with trees	Hwange Power Station	None	2009	2 February 2009	30 September 2015
96			$50	148 × 74 mm	Purple	Domboremari with trees	Hwange Power Station	None	2009	2 February 2009	30 September 2015
97			$100	148 × 74 mm	Brown	Domboremari with trees	Harare, Eternal Flame at the National Heroes' Acre	None	2009	2 February 2009	30 September 2015
98			$500	148 × 74 mm	Green	Domboremari with trees	Three African elephants	None	2009	2 February 2009	30 September 2015
These images are to scale at 0.7 pixel per millimetre (18 pixel per inch). For table standards, see the banknote specification table.

== Bond notes (2016–2019) ==
US$10 million worth of Zimbabwean Bond Notes were introduced in November 2016 and are denominated in U.S. dollars. They circulate along with eight other currencies, but could not be used outside of Zimbabwe. Withdrawals from Zimbabwean bank accounts were issued in Bond Notes. On 20 February 2019, during the Monetary Policy Statement, the Governor Dr Mangundya announced that physical bond notes, RTGS, Ecocash or OneWallet balances would all now be known as "RTGS dollars". These bear the signature of John Mangudya, the Governor of the Reserve Bank of Zimbabwe.

Bond notes, 2016 (Signature: John Mangudya; Capital: Harare)
Pick No.	Image		Value	Dimensions	Main colour	Description			Date of		
Pick No.	Obverse	Reverse	Value	Dimensions	Main colour	Obverse	Reverse	Watermark	printing	issue	withdrawal
99			$2	155 × 62 mm	Green	Domboremari with trees	Eternal Flame at the National Heroes' Acre, Old Parliament House	Zimbabwe Bird and "RBZ"	2016	28 November 2016	11 November 2019
100			$5	155 × 66 mm	Purple	Domboremari with trees	Three giraffes, Zimbabwe Aloe (Aloe excelsa)	Zimbabwe Bird and "RBZ"	2016	3 February 2017	11 November 2019
These images are to scale at 0.7 pixel per millimetre (18 pixel per inch). For table standards, see the banknote specification table.

== Banknotes of the fifth dollar (2019–2024) ==
On 11 November 2019, new banknotes of $2 and $5 were issued without the words "Bond Note".

On 15 May 2020, the RBZ announced the introduction of $10 and $20 notes into circulation. The $10 note entered circulation on 19 May, and the $20 note entered circulation in the first week of June.

On 6 July 2021 the $50 note entered circulation.

On 5 April 2022 the $100 note entered circulation.

The Zimbabwe dollar is replaced by Zimbabwe Gold from 8 April 2024.

2019 series (Signature: John Mangudya; Capital: Harare)
Image		Value	Dimensions	Main colour	Description			Date of			Ref.
Obverse	Reverse	Value	Dimensions	Main colour	Obverse	Reverse	Watermark	printing	issue	withdrawal	Ref.
		$2	155 × 62 mm	Green	Domboremari with trees	Eternal Flame at the National Heroes' Acre, Old Parliament House	Zimbabwe Bird and "RBZ"	2019	11 November 2019	30 April 2024	
		$5	155 × 66 mm	Purple	Domboremari with trees	Three giraffes, Zimbabwe Aloe (Aloe excelsa)	Zimbabwe Bird and "RBZ"	2019	11 November 2019	30 April 2024	
		$10	155 × 66 mm	Red	Domboremari with trees	New Reserve Bank Tower, four African buffaloes (Syncerus caffer)	Zimbabwe Bird and "RBZ"	2020	19 May 2020	30 April 2024	
		$20	155 × 66 mm	Blue	Domboremari with trees	African elephant, Victoria Falls (Mosi-oa Tunya)	Zimbabwe Bird and "RBZ"	2020	1 June 2020	30 April 2024	
		$50	155 × 66 mm	Brown	Domboremari with trees	Tomb of the Unknown Soldier at the National Heroes' Acre, Mbuya Nehanda	Zimbabwe Bird and "RBZ"	2020	6 July 2021	30 April 2024	
		$100	155 × 66 mm	Yellow	Domboremari with trees	African baobab (Adansonia digitata), Great Zimbabwe ruins	Zimbabwe Bird and "RBZ"	2020; 2023	5 April 2022	30 April 2024	
These images are to scale at 0.7 pixel per millimetre (18 pixel per inch). For table standards, see the banknote specification table.

== Banknotes of the ZiG (2024–present) ==
=== 2024 series ===
The Reserve Bank unveiled banknotes of the ZiG (Zimbabwean Gold) on 5 April 2024, which originally consisted of eight denominations from 1 ZiG to 200 ZiG. However, only the 10 and 20 ZiG notes entered circulation: The 1, 2 and 5 ZiG notes were cancelled and issued as coins instead, while the release of the 50, 100 and 200 ZiG notes were postponed (then never released) on 30 May 2024, due to concerns by the Reserve Bank that their release would "fuel inflation".

The ZiG banknotes are almost identical in design, different only by value and colour: the front features the Domboremari and a QR code, while the reverse features liquid gold being moulded on top of a stack of 12 gold bars. Scanning the QR code returns a plain text string "Reserve Bank of Zimbabwe ZiG# Harare 2024", where # is the denomination.

2024 series (Signature: John Mushayavanhu; Capital: Harare)
Value	Dimensions	Main colour	Description			Date of	
Value	Dimensions	Main colour	Obverse	Reverse	Watermark	printing	issue
1 ZiG	155 × 65 mm	Blue	Domboremari with trees	Liquid gold being moulded on top of a stack of 12 gold bars	Zimbabwe Bird and "RBZ"	2024	Never issued
2 ZiG	155 × 65 mm	Green	Domboremari with trees	Liquid gold being moulded on top of a stack of 12 gold bars	Zimbabwe Bird and "RBZ"	2024	Never issued
5 ZiG	155 × 65 mm	Pink	Domboremari with trees	Liquid gold being moulded on top of a stack of 12 gold bars	Zimbabwe Bird and "RBZ"	2024	Never issued
10 ZiG	155 × 65 mm	Navy blue	Domboremari with trees	Liquid gold being moulded on top of a stack of 12 gold bars	Zimbabwe Bird and "RBZ"	2024	30 April 2024
20 ZiG	155 × 65 mm	Peach and green	Domboremari with trees	Liquid gold being moulded on top of a stack of 12 gold bars	Zimbabwe Bird and "RBZ"	2024	13 May 2024
50 ZiG	155 × 65 mm	Brown	Domboremari with trees	Liquid gold being moulded on top of a stack of 12 gold bars	Zimbabwe Bird and "RBZ"	2024	Never issued
100 ZiG	155 × 65 mm	Olive green	Domboremari with trees	Liquid gold being moulded on top of a stack of 12 gold bars	Zimbabwe Bird and "RBZ"	2024	Never issued
200 ZiG	155 × 65 mm	Red	Domboremari with trees	Liquid gold being moulded on top of a stack of 12 gold bars	Zimbabwe Bird and "RBZ"	2024	Never issued
For table standards, see the banknote specification table.

=== 2026 series ===
On 27 February 2026, the Reserve Bank unveiled the second series of ZiG banknotes, also known as the "BiG5" series: consisting of five denominations, the first three (10, 20 and 50 ZiG) entered circulation on 7 April 2026, and the remainder (100 and 200 ZiG) will follow later. The front of the notes features the Domboremari and one of the Big Five game animals, hence the "BiG5" name: the reverse features various landmarks.

2026 series (Signature: John Mushayavanhu; Capital: Harare)
Value	Dimensions	Main colour	Description			Date of	
Value	Dimensions	Main colour	Obverse	Reverse	Watermark	printing	issue
10 ZiG	130 × 65 mm	Red	Cape buffalo, Domboremari with trees	Balancing rocks at Matobo Hills	Zimbabwe Bird and "10"	2026	7 April 2026
20 ZiG	137 × 65 mm	Brown	African elephant, Domboremari with trees	New Parliament Building	Zimbabwe Bird and "20"	2026	7 April 2026
50 ZiG	144 × 65 mm	Green	Rhinoceros, Domboremari with trees	Kariba Dam	Zimbabwe Bird and "50"	2026	7 April 2026
100 ZiG	151 × 65 mm	Purple	Leopard, Domboremari with trees	Victoria Falls	Zimbabwe Bird and "100"	2026	Not yet issued
200 ZiG	158 × 65 mm	Blue	Lion, Domboremari with trees	Great Zimbabwe ruins	Zimbabwe Bird and "200"	2026	Not yet issued
For table standards, see the banknote specification table.

== Replacement banknotes ==
The Reserve Bank allocated special prefixes for replacement banknotes: prefixes for replacement Zimbabwean banknotes vary, although it largely settled on "ZA" for issues of the second, third and fourth dollar.

Currency	Replacement prefixes	Ref.
First dollar (1980–1994)	AW ($2); BW ($5); CW ($10); DW ($20)	
First dollar (1994–2003)	AB ($5); AC ($10); AD ($20); AE ($50); AF ($100); AP ($500 red); TA/TB ($500 brown); AW ($1,000)	
First dollar (bearer cheques)	ZA/ZB/ZC/ZD ($5,000); ZE/ZF/ZG/ZH ($10,000); ZJ/ZK/ZL/ZM ($10,000); ZA/ZB/CZ ($50,000); ZA/ZB ($100,000)	
Second dollar	ZA/ZB ($10,000); ZA/ZE ($10 million); ZA (all others, including agro-cheques)	
Third and fourth dollar	ZA	
Bond notes	AZ	
Fifth dollar	AZ ($2–$20); ZZ ($50 and $100)	
ZiG (2024 series)	ZX	

== Notaphilic significance ==
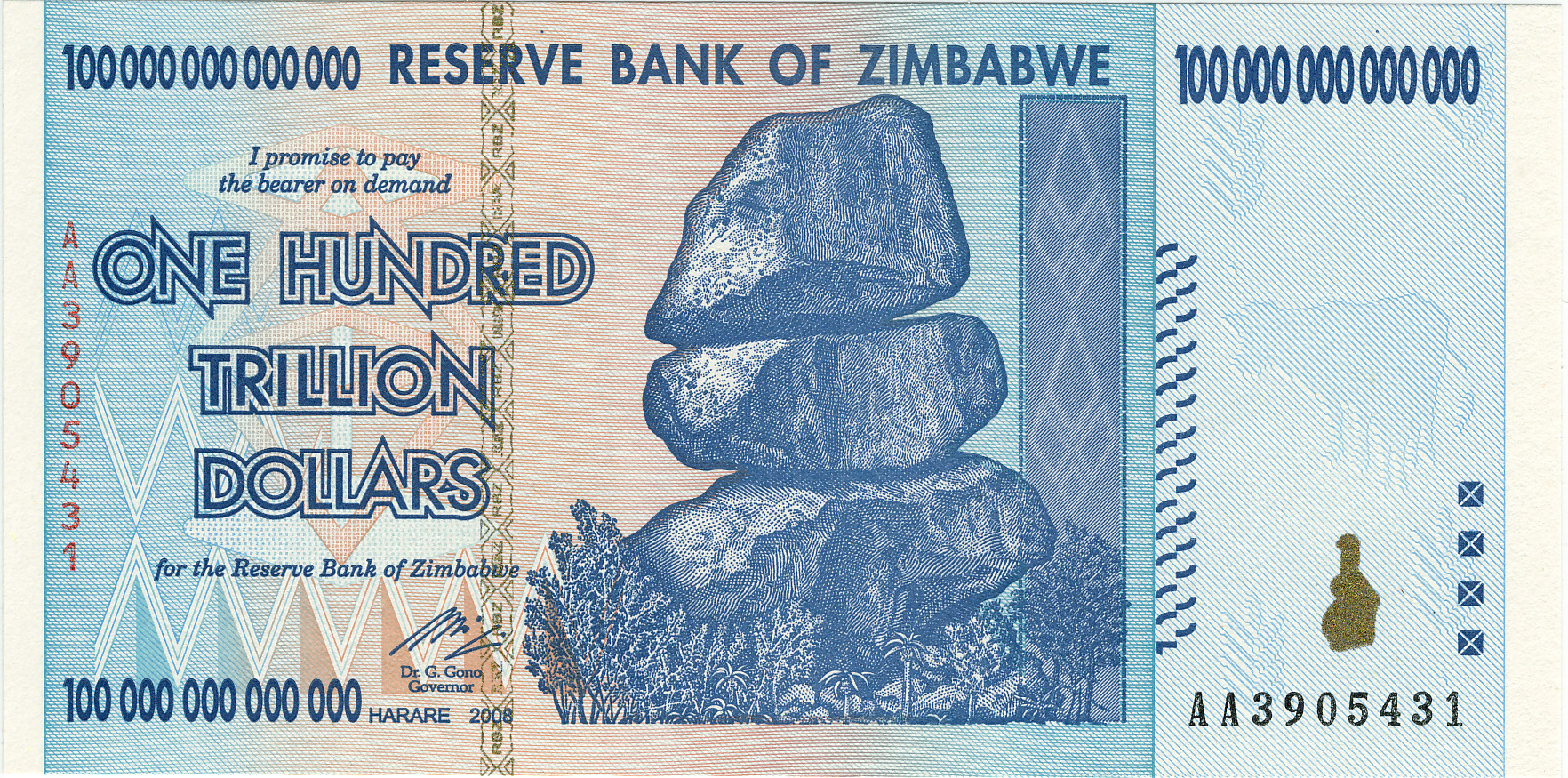
The obverse of the $100 trillion banknote

Hyperinflationary Zimbabwean banknotes (such as the $100 trillion denomination) have earned significant interest from the notaphilic community and buyers in general for their absurdity rather than for their designs, with examples selling for much more than their true face value: according to The Wall Street Journal in 2011, United States House Budget Committee Chairman Paul Ryan and Stanford University economist John B. Taylor each kept a $100 trillion note in their wallet as a physical reminder of the perils of hyperinflation. At the same time, hyperinflationary notes have been targeted by investment scams similar to those affecting the Iraqi dinar, where promoters falsely claim that the notes would be "revalued" (deflated) to a profitable exchange rate.

The collectors' value of a Zimbabwean banknote depends on various factors: the rarity, based on factors such as the name of capital city, how long it was printed, or the type of watermark; its condition, and the national situation at the time of issue, such as shortages or hyperinflation. Common designs and variants, such as the low-value bearer cheques of the second dollar, are usually valued at around US$1 each, while rare varieties such as the $10 "Salisbury error" note and the Standard Chartered issues are valued at around US$190 or more. (Note: A version of the $20 note, dated 1982, was estimated to be worth about US$525 in June 2026.)

== Other circulating scrip ==
During the height of the 2007–2009 hyperinflation, petrol coupons circulated alongside the Zimbabwean dollar in response to a shortage of local banknotes (at the time, it was illegal to trade in foreign currencies such as the United States dollar): the coupons, particularly those worth 20 litres (5.3 US gallons), became widely negotiable at the local petrol price (about one pound sterling per litre, or US$1.50 in August 2008), despite warnings from the Reserve Bank of Zimbabwe against its "widespread use". The popularity of the coupons led to it becoming a target of counterfeiters, due to limited security features.

== See also ==
- Reserve Bank of Zimbabwe
- Zimbabwean dollar
- Hyperinflation in Zimbabwe
- Economy of Zimbabwe
- Mosi-oa-Tunya (coin)
