= Zimbabwean one hundred trillion dollar note =

Obsolete Zimbabwean banknote

$100 trillion
- Country: Zimbabwe
- Value: $100,000,000,000,000 ($10^{14})
- Width: 148 mm
- Height: 74 mm
- Security features: Optically variable ink
- Material used: Paper
- Years of printing: 2009

Obverse
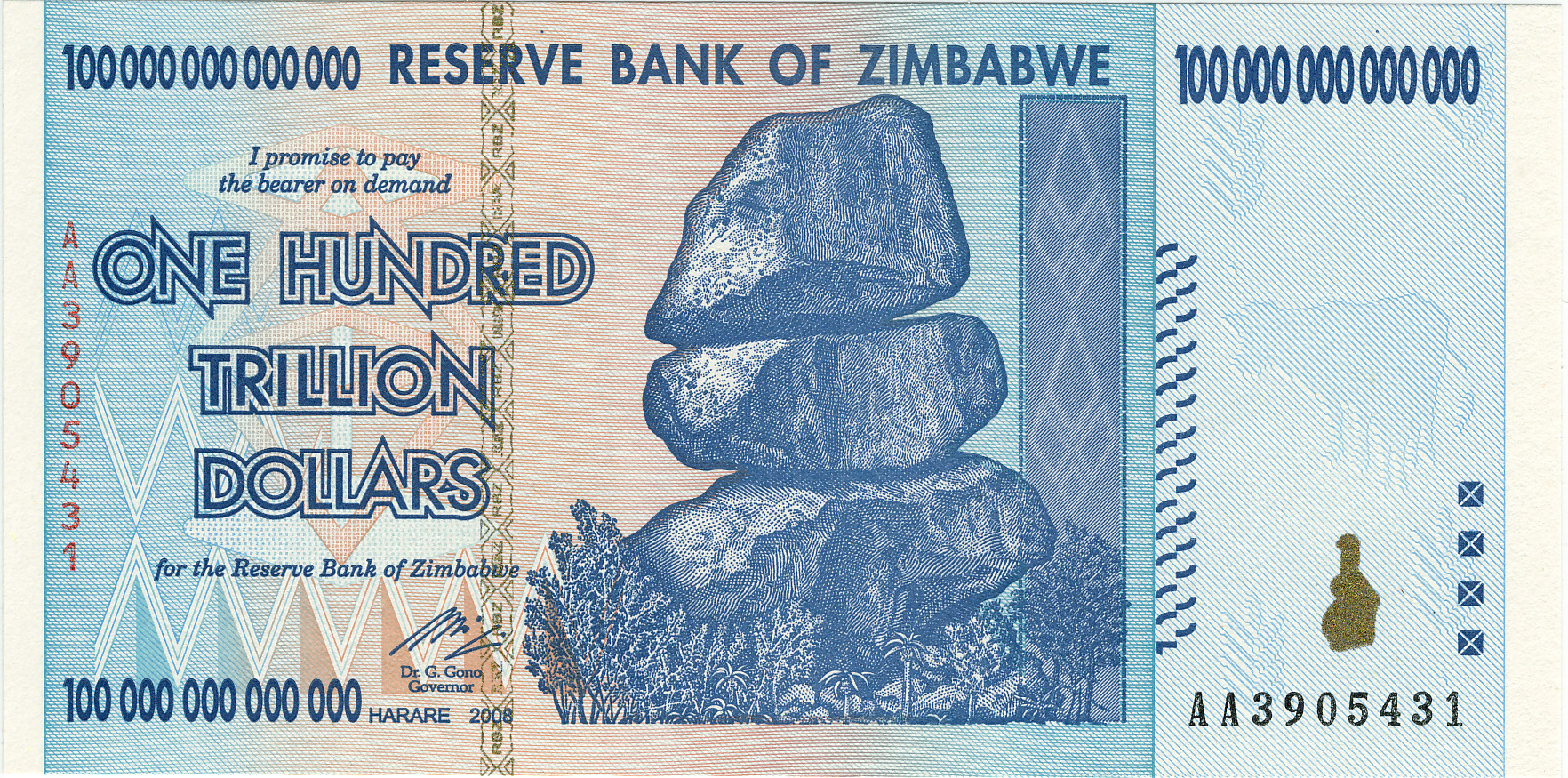
- Design: Domboremari

Reverse
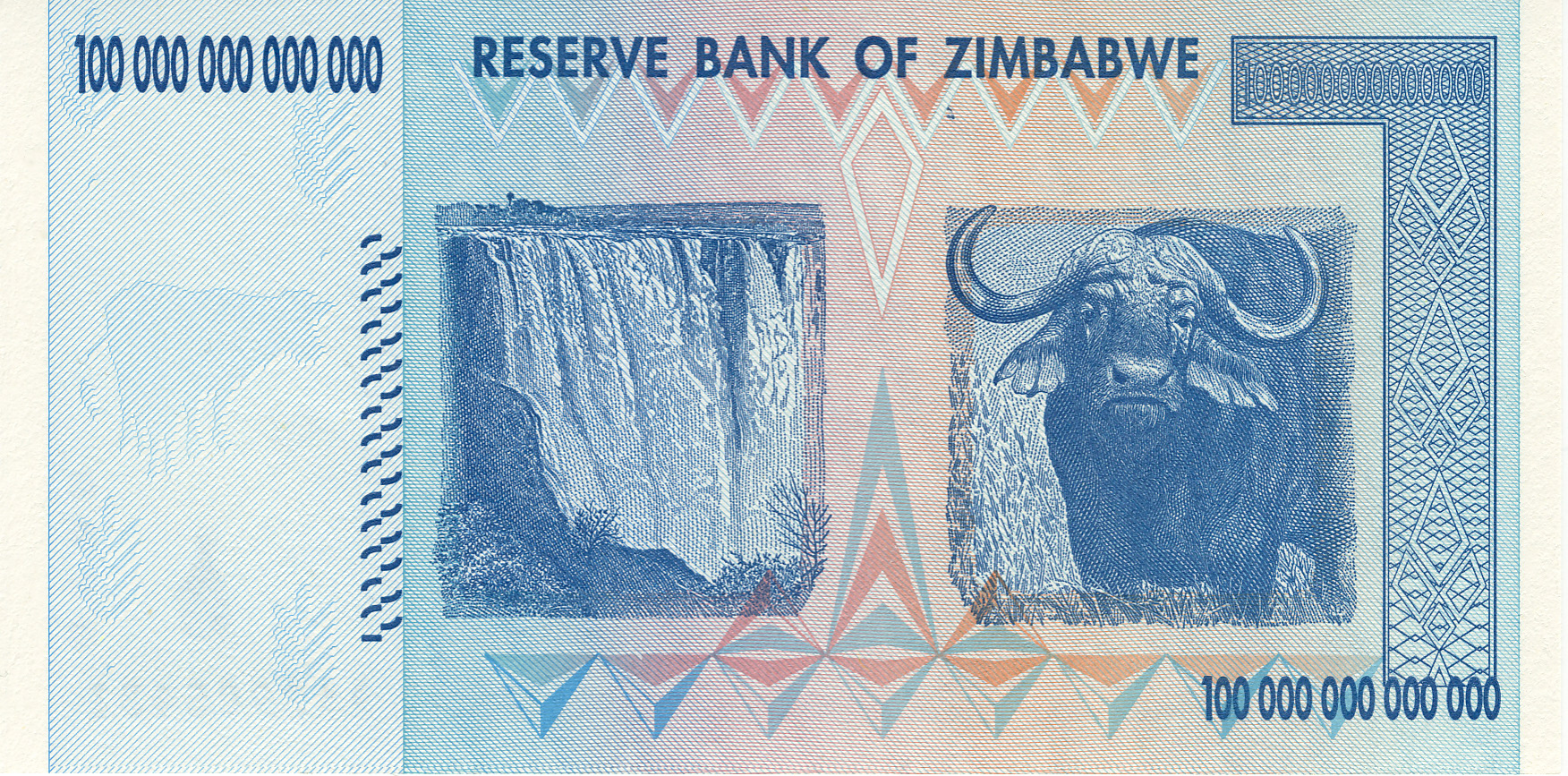
- Design: Victoria Falls; Cape buffalo

The Zimbabwean one hundred trillion dollar note was a banknote of the third Zimbabwean dollar with a face value of $100 trillion, equal to 40 US cents in 2015 (57 cents in 2026). Issued by the Reserve Bank of Zimbabwe and legal tender from January to June 2009, it was one of the world's largest currency denominations (along with the last notes of the Hungarian pengő), and symbolised the 2007–2009 period of hyperinflation in Zimbabwe. It has since gained significant interest from economists and banknote collectors, with examples selling for much more than their 2015 face value.

== Description ==
The $100 trillion note was part of a series of banknotes of the third Zimbabwean dollar, which circulated from 1 August 2008 until 12 April 2009. The paper note is mainly blue with a peach accent, and measures 148 mm wide and 74 mm high: the front features an illustration of the Domboremari near Epworth at centre – a regular feature on the front of Zimbabwean notes since 1981; the reverse features Victoria Falls on the left, and a Cape buffalo on the right. The note lacked modern security features, such as a watermark, due to sanctions against the Zimbabwean government and the Reserve Bank at the time: instead, the note had a patterned stripe and a silhouette of the Zimbabwe Bird in optically variable ink.

== Circulation history ==
The Reserve Bank of Zimbabwe introduced the $100 trillion banknote on 16 January 2009, along with those for $10 trillion, $20 trillion and $50 trillion: at the time, Zimbabwe went through severe hyperinflation, with BBC News reporting that the $100 trillion note was worth around US$30 or £20 on its first day in circulation.

The $100 trillion note did not last long in circulation: on 2 February 2009, the fourth Zimbabwean dollar replaced the third dollar, with the note itself being equal to 100 fourth dollars: the Reserve Bank meant to have the $100 trillion notes co-circulate with notes of the fourth dollar until 30 June 2009, but the power-sharing government of Prime Minister Morgan Tsvangirai instead suspended the Zimbabwean dollar entirely on 12 April 2009.

== Aftermath ==
Despite falling out of use in favour of hard currencies such as the United States dollar in April 2009, the $100 trillion banknote remained redeemable until 30 September 2015, 6 years and 171 days after the Zimbabwean dollar was originally abandoned: by then, banknote collectors were selling $100 trillion notes for much more than their June 2015 face value of 40 US cents. The notes also became a target of investment scams similar to those affecting the Iraqi dinar, where promoters falsely claimed that the notes would be "revalued" (deflated) to a profitable exchange rate, and counterfeits that capitalised on the note's high collectable value.

According to The Wall Street Journal in 2011, United States House Budget Committee Chairman Paul Ryan and Stanford University economist John B. Taylor each kept a $100 trillion note in their wallet as a physical reminder of the perils of hyperinflation.

== See also ==
- Banknotes of Zimbabwe

== Bibliography ==
- Linzmayer, Owen (2025). "Zimbabwe". The Banknote Book. Virginia Beach: CDN Publishing.
