= Shalon =

Shalon is the name of:

== Surname ==
- Gery Shalon, Georgian-Israeli cybercriminal
- Rachel Shalon (1904–1988), Israeli engineer

== Given Name ==
- Shalon Baker (born 1973), Canadian Football League player
- Shalon Knight (born 2000), Antigua and Barbudan international footballer

== See also ==
- Shallon (disambiguation)
