= Shallon =

Shallon may refer to:

- David Shallon (1950–2000), Israeli conductor
- Gaultheria shallon, species of shrub
- Shallon Lester (born 1981), American gossip columnist and YouTuber
- Shallon Olsen (born 2000), Canadian artistic gymnast
- Sport Clube Shallon, Brazilian football club

== See also ==
- Shalon (disambiguation)
