= Marjem Chatterton =

Israelian and Zimbabwean engineer

Marjem Chatterton FIStructE
- מרג'ם צ'טרטון
- Born: 28 September 1916; Warsaw, Poland
- Died: 27 January 2010 (aged 93); United Kingdom
- Known for: Structural engineering
- Relatives: Rachel Shalon

Marjem Chatterton (Hebrew: מרג'ם צ'טרטון; 28 September 1916 – 27 January 2010) was a pioneering engineer in Israel and Zimbabwe, specialising in multi storey reinforced concrete buildings. She was the first female fellow of the Institution of Structural Engineers. Chatterton designed some of Zimbabwe's first skyscrapers.

== Early life and education ==
She was born Marjem or Marynia Znamirowska in Warsaw, Poland, in 1916, as an Orthodox Jew. In 1932 the family emigrated to Mandatory Palestine. Znamirowska had intended returning to Poland but by 1934 it was clear that the situation was becoming dangerous for Jews in Poland so Znamirowska attended the Technion – the Israel Institute of Technology in Haifa to study engineering. Znamirowska's aunt Rachel Shalon (née Znanmirowska) the first Israeli female engineer, was on faculty there, having qualified in 1930.

== Career ==
Znamirowska graduated from her civil engineering course in 1939 and began working in the Technical Office of the Collective Settlements Association. By 1947 Znamirowska had married a British man, Frank Chatterton, and they moved with their family to Southern Rhodesia (which became Zimbabwe in 1980). Chatterton got a job working as a reinforced concrete designer immediately. Chatterton was working with Lysaght and Company until 1957 when she initially started consulting. In 1969 she established her consulting firm, M. Chatterton and Partners. Chatterton used her experience with concrete to design some of Zimbabwe's first skyscrapers, banks and building societies as well as cotton, fertiliser, and sugar industrial buildings. During this time Chatterton became a member of the Institution of Structural Engineers. She was the first woman to win the Andrews Prize and also won the Wallace Premium Prize. In 1954 she became the Institute's first female fellow.

When the political situation in Zimbabwe deteriorated in 1976 Chatterton moved to Leeds to work in the University as a lecturer. Chatterton was involved in encouraging girls into engineering careers through the university's and girl's schools campaign. Chatterton returned to her consultancy in Zimbabwe in 1984. She also took on a teaching role in the national university. The country's independence in 1980 ensured development investment and building projects. Chatterton's last big project was the tallest office building, the 26-storey Reserve Bank.

== Later life ==
Chatterton continued working until 1999 when the political situation again became unstable and she retired and returned to the UK. Chatterton died on 27 January 2010. She is buried in Exeter.
