= Noel Bruce =

South African banker (born 1921)

Governor of the Reserve Bank of Rhodesia
- In office 1964–1976
- Preceded by: B. C. J. Richards
- Succeeded by: Desmond Krogh

Personal details
- Born: 13 November 1921 Fauresmith, Orange Free State, Union of South Africa

Noel Hugh Botha Bruce, ID (born 13 November 1921) was a South African and Rhodesian banker and businessman. He was the Governor of the Reserve Bank of Rhodesia from 1964 to 1976.

Bruce was born on 13 November 1921 in Fauresmith. He graduated from the University of South Africa.

He worked with the South African Reserve Bank from 1938 to 1955. In 1956, he emigrated to Southern Rhodesia. He was chief cashier of the Bank of Rhodesia and Nyasaland from 1959. Following his term as Governor of the Reserve Bank of Rhodesia, he was a director of Central Merchant Bank in South Africa from 1976 to 1990. He was director of Mutual Life Assurance Society since 1987.
