= Balancing rocks of Zimbabwe =

Balancing rocks
- Topographic feature
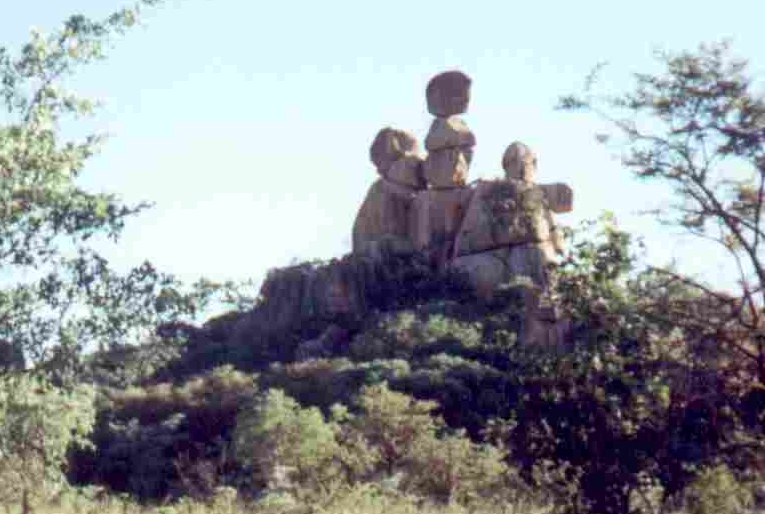
- Balancing formation seen in Matobo National Park, known as the Mother and Child inselberg
- Interactive map of Balancing rocks
- Location: Zimbabwe

Balancing rocks are found in many parts of Zimbabwe. These geomorphological features are formed of igneous rocks. Particularly noteworthy balancing rocks are located in Matobo National Park and near the township of Epworth, to the southeast of Harare.

== Notable rocks ==
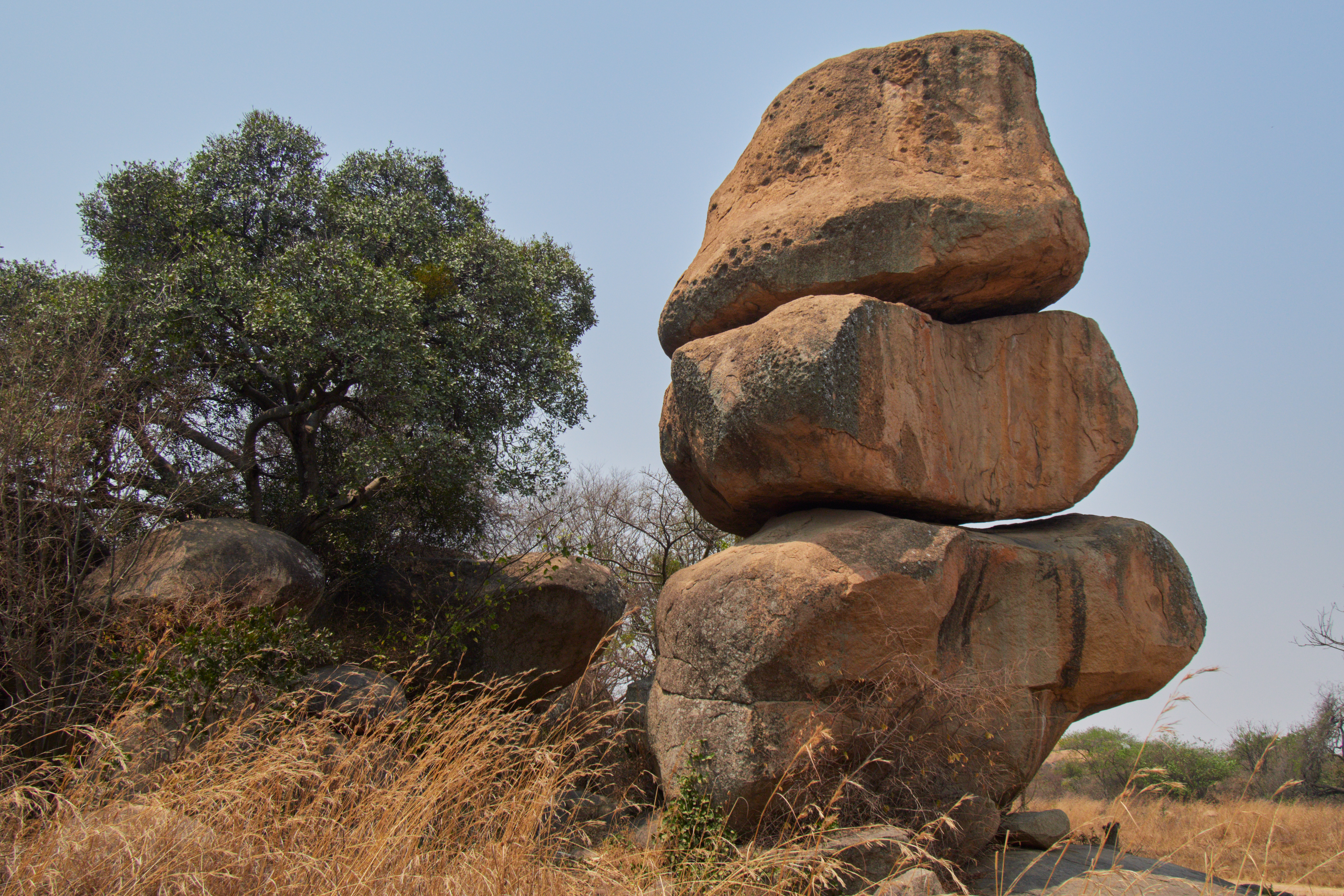
Domboremari / Money Rock at Chiremba / Epworth Balancing Rocks

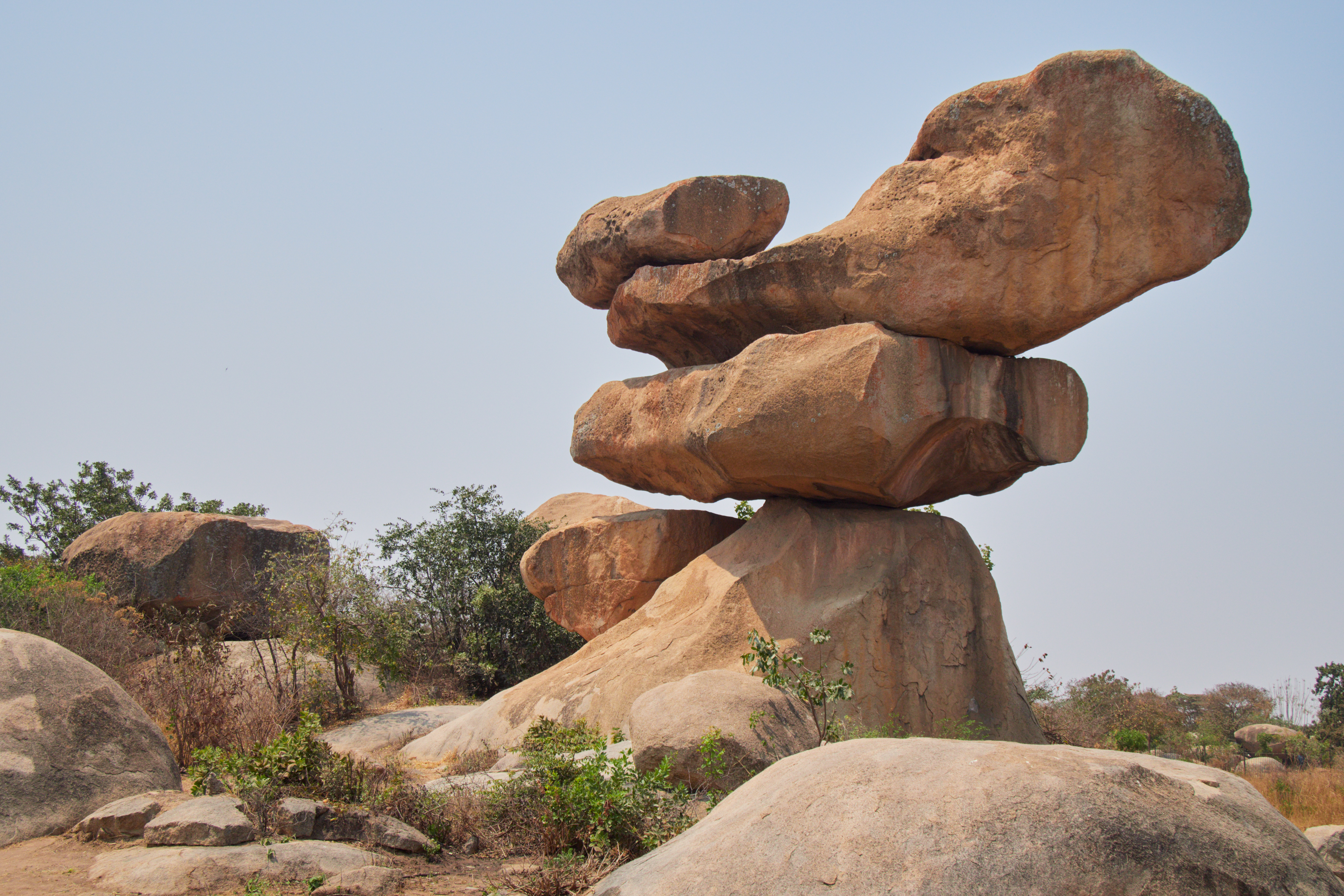
Naturally balanced granite boulders stacked at Chiremba/Epworth Balancing Rocks.

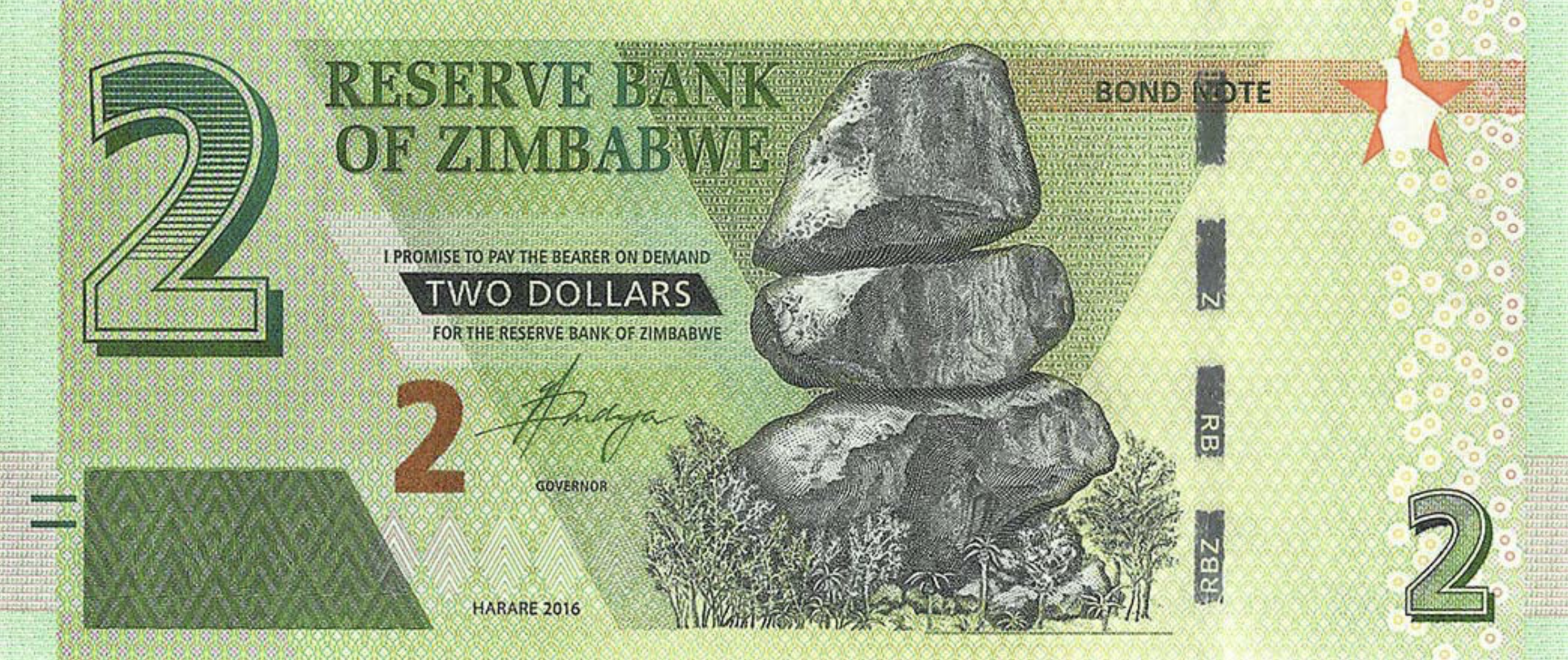
The Domboremari depicted on a Zimbabwean banknote

The Domboremari, also known as the Money Rock, is a formation of three boulders that form part of the Chiremba Balancing Rocks on the northwestern outskirts of Epworth (at coordinates 17.8856°S 31.1256°E). This rock formation is notable because it appears in all Zimbabwean banknotes issued since 1981, and is also the prominent feature of the logo of the Reserve Bank of Zimbabwe.

== See also ==
- Balancing rock
- List of individual rocks
