= Rachel Shalon =

Israeli engineer

- רחל שלון
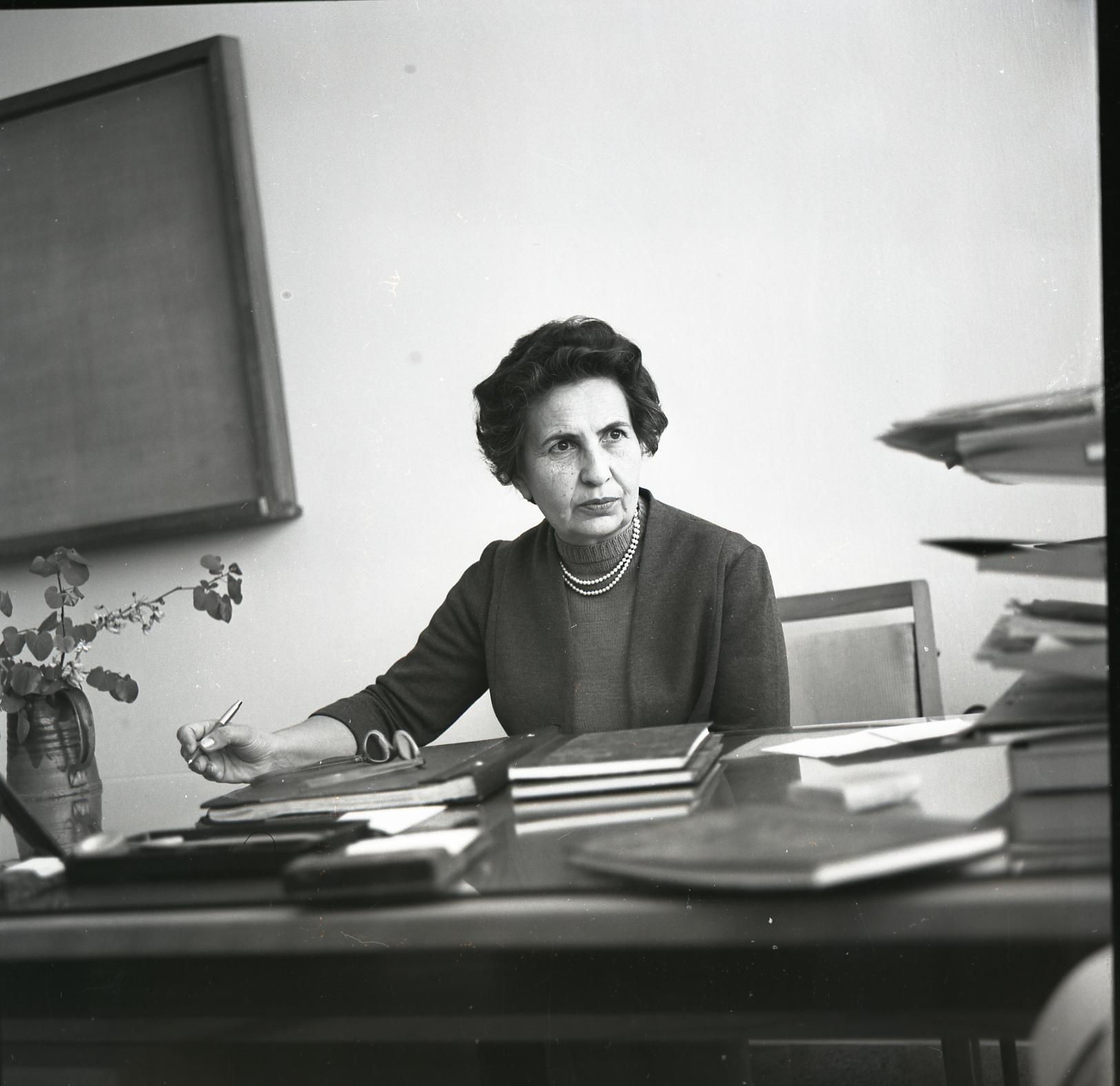
- Born: Rachel Znamirowska; 1904; Kalush, Poland
- Died: 1988 (aged 83–84); Haifa, Israel
- Occupations: Structural engineer, academic

Rachel Shalon (Hebrew: רחל שלון, born Rachel Znamirowska) (March 1904 - Sept. 1988) was the first woman engineer in Israel (and formerly in the British Mandate of Palestine) and a professor of structural engineering. Shalon was first of all Technion graduates, male and female, to reach the rank of full professor.

== Early life and education ==
Rachel Znamirowska was born in Kalush, Poland on the eve of Passover 1904 to Gittel and Hanoch Znamirowski, a Hassidic family. Her father was a lumber merchant, and she grew up in Kalush.

Her father taught her, and her siblings the importance of independence. As a young girl, she was determined to learn Hebrew even though her father forbade it. Aged fifteen, she decided that she wanted to attend a Jewish school in Warsaw, due to the antisemitism in the private school she attended. Her parents did not want her to leave home, so she went on a hunger strike and was eventually allowed to move to her aunt's home in Warsaw, where she graduated from high school with honors in mathematics.

She then studied chemical engineering at Warsaw's polytechnic institute, but due to antisemitism she experienced there, she intended to continue her studies in the Czech Republic instead. Before she moved colleges, in 1925 she joined a group of Jewish students on a tour of Eretz Yisrael, at the time Mandatory Palestine, where the Hebrew University had recently opened. She decided to make Aliyah and stay there, to her parents' chagrin, and they told her that they would stop supporting her financially. She studied structural engineering in the Technion, and worked in the laboratories of the Nesher cement factory during her studies, graduating in 1930.

== Career ==
From 1931 and until her retirement in 1973 Shalon was a member of the academic staff at the Technion, in the faculty for civil engineering. Over the years she was appointed as vice president for Research, Vice President for Academic Affairs, and Dean of the School for Graduate Studies. In 1956 Shalon was made a professor and in 1965, she was appointed Rector of the Technion. At this time only around 8% engineering students at the Technion were women and Shalon said, "I have closer and more intimate ties with the female students; they also turn to me with personal problems, as a woman speaks to another".

Alongside her academic work she was a member of the Hagana organization and, upon the establishment of the State of Israel, served as an officer in the Israel Defense Forces with the rank of a Major.

Shortly after the establishment of the State of Israel, Shalon was appointed as chairperson of the professional committee for building within the Scientific Council at the Prime Minister's Office. She remained in this position until 1956, quitting in protest of insufficient funds aimed at research of construction. At this time Shalon established the Building Research Station, which she headed for 20 years.

Shalon was a member of the Council for Higher Education in Israel. In 1954 she established the local chapter of Soroptimist organization, later becoming president of its European federation. In 1959 Shalon was elected as president of the International Union of Laboratories and Experts in Construction Materials, Systems and Structures (RILEM) and in 1962 as member of the executive in the International Council for Construction Research.

Together with her husband, engineer Uriel Shalon, she established a fund for construction of student dorms in the city.

In 1960, Shalon was interviewed by Ada Cohen for Maariv, a very popular commercial newspaper in Israel at the time, in an article titled “Mrs. Professor”.

== Awards and honours ==
- Honorary citizen of Haifa
- In 1980, Shalon was among the torch lighters in the official Independence Day celebrations
- In 1988, she received an honorary doctorate from the Technion

== Personal life ==
In 1930 Rachel Znamirowska married Uriel Shalon, also an engineer, and became known as Rachel Shalon.

Professor Rachel Shalon's niece Marjem Chatterton (née Znamirowska/Znamerovschi) also studied engineering at the Technicon in 1934-1939 and became a leading structural engineer in both Israel and Zimbabwe.

== Images ==
Four images taken in Professor Shalon's office in 1963 by Boris Carmi are held by the National Library of Israel. They show the piece of concrete and vase of flowers on her desk mentioned in the 1960 Maariv article.
