= Derosiphia =

Scientific classification
- Kingdom: Plantae
- Clade: Tracheophytes
- Clade: Angiosperms
- Clade: Eudicots
- Clade: Rosids
- Order: Myrtales
- Family: Melastomataceae
- Subfamily: Melastomatoideae
- Tribe: Melastomateae
- Genus: Derosiphia; Raf.
- Species: D. tubulosa

Binomial name
- Derosiphia tubulosa (Sm.) Raf.

Synonyms
- Dissotis tubulosa (Sm.) Triana; Osbeckia tubulosa Sm. (1813) (basionym); Podocaelia tubulosa (Sm.) A.Fern. & R.Fern.

Genus of plants

Derosiphia is a monotypic genus of flowering plants in the family Melastomataceae. It contains a single species, Derosiphia tubulosa.

The species is native to tropical Africa, ranging from Senegal to South Sudan.
