= Antherotoma =

Scientific classification
- Kingdom: Plantae
- Clade: Tracheophytes
- Clade: Angiosperms
- Clade: Eudicots
- Clade: Rosids
- Order: Myrtales
- Family: Melastomataceae
- Genus: Antherotoma (Naudin) Hook.f.

Genus of flowering plants

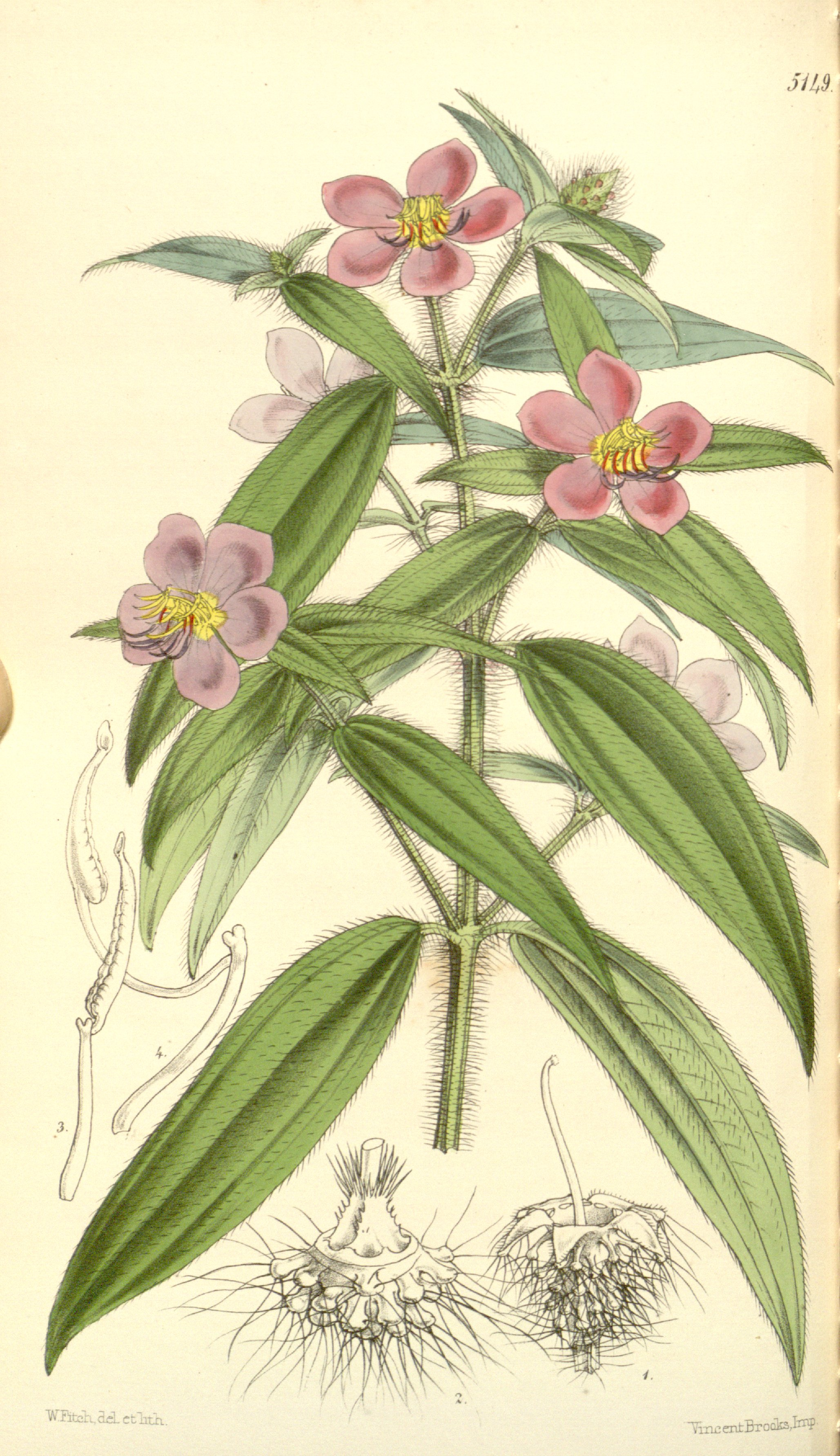
Antherotoma irvingiana

Antherotoma is a genus of flowering plants belonging to the family Melastomataceae.

Its native range is Tropical and Southern Africa, Comoros, Madagascar.

Species:

- Antherotoma angustifolia (A.Fern. & R.Fern.) Jacq.-Fél.
- Antherotoma clandestina Jacq.-Fél.
- Antherotoma debilis (Sond.) Jacq.-Fél.
- Antherotoma densiflora (Gilg) Jacq.-Fél.
- Antherotoma gracilis (Cogn.) Jacq.-Fél.
- Antherotoma irvingiana (Hook.) Jacq.-Fél.
- Antherotoma naudinii Hook.f.
- Antherotoma senegambiensis (Guill. & Perr.) Jacq.-Fél.
- Antherotoma tenuis (A.Fern. & R.Fern.) Jacq.-Fél.
- Antherotoma tisserantii (Jacq.-Fél.) Jacq.-Fél.
