= Nerophila =

Scientific classification
- Kingdom: Plantae
- Clade: Tracheophytes
- Clade: Angiosperms
- Clade: Eudicots
- Clade: Rosids
- Order: Myrtales
- Family: Melastomataceae
- Genus: Nerophila; Naudin
- Species: N. gentianoides

Binomial name
- Nerophila gentianoides Naudin

Genus of plants

Nerophila is a monotypic genus of flowering plants belonging to the family Melastomataceae. The only species is Nerophila gentianoides.

Its native range is Tropical Africa.
