= Anthony Grafftey-Smith =

- Born: 1903; United Kingdom
- Died: 1960 (aged 56–57); Rhodesia
- Occupation: Central banker
- Military career
- Branch: British Army
- Service years: 1940-1945
- Rank: Lieutenant colonel
- Unit: 3rd County of London Yeomanry
- Conflicts: World War II

Sir Anthony Paul Grafftey-Smith, CBE, TD (1903–1960), born Anthony Paul Grafftey Smith, was a British central banker.

He joined the Bank of England in 1923, becoming Assistant Principal of the Discount of Office in 1938. During the Second World War, he served with the British Army and became chief financial officer of the Allied Commission for Italy. After the war, he became Acting Adviser to the Governors in 1947 and Deputy Chief Cashier in 1948.

In 1952, he left the Bank of England and became Financial Adviser to the Government of Southern Rhodesia. He was the first head of the Bank of Rhodesia and Nyasaland until his death in 1960, aged 57.

He was knighted in the 1960 New Year Honours.
