= Almedanthus =

Scientific classification
- Kingdom: Plantae
- Clade: Tracheophytes
- Clade: Angiosperms
- Clade: Eudicots
- Clade: Rosids
- Order: Myrtales
- Family: Melastomataceae
- Genus: Almedanthus; Ver.-Lib. & R.D.Stone (2020)
- Species: A. pachytrichus

Binomial name
- Almedanthus pachytrichus (Gilg ex R.E.Fr.) Ver.-Lib. & R.D.Stone (2020)

Synonyms
- Dissotis pachytricha Gilg ex R.E.Fr. (1914)

Genus of plants

Almedanthus pachytrichus is a species of flowering plant in the family Melastomataceae. It is native to Tanzania, Democratic Republic of the Congo, and northeastern Zambia. It is the sole species in genus Almedanthus.
