= E.T. Gleitsmann =

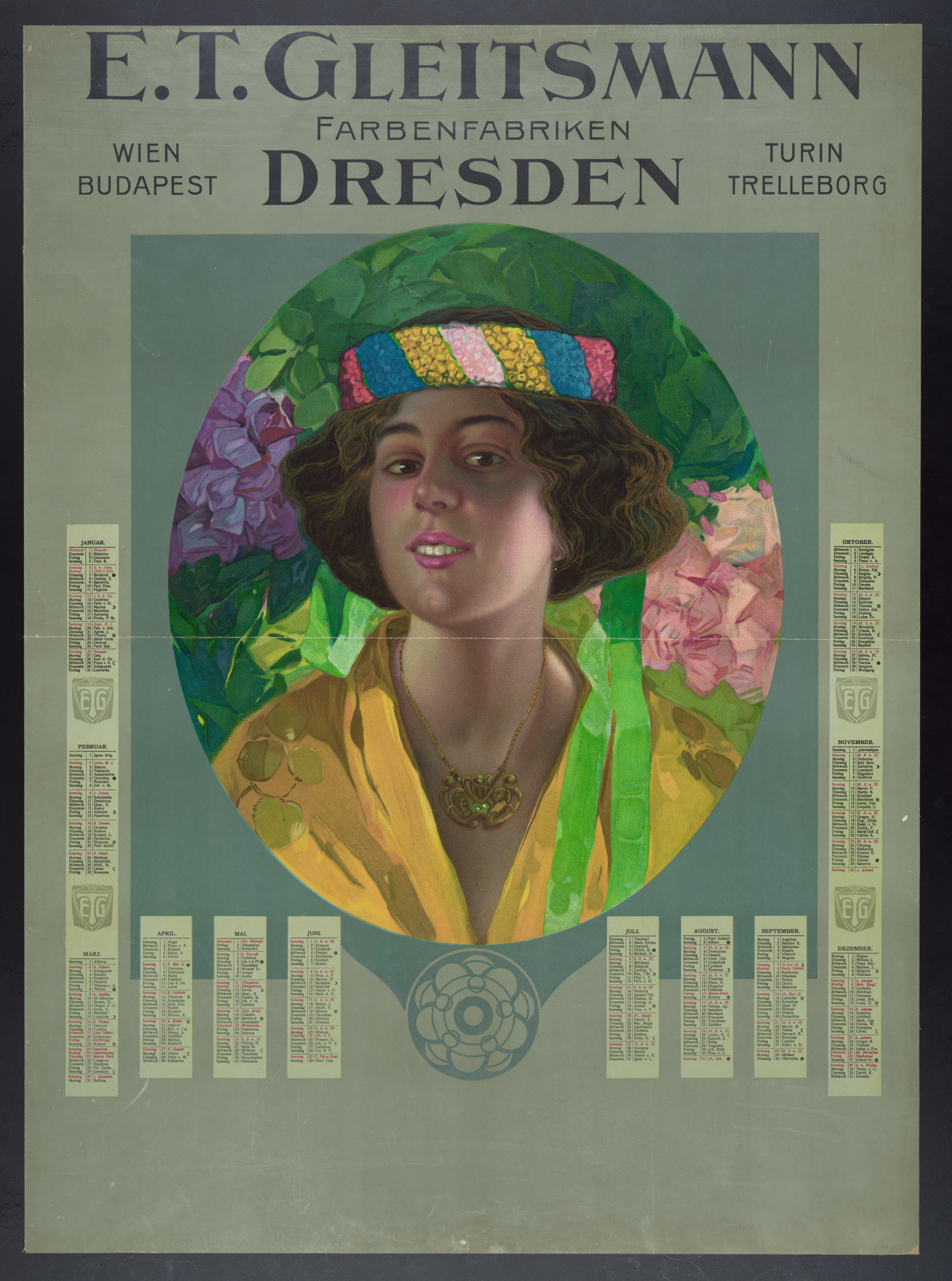
- Industry: Printing ink
- Founded: 1847
- Founder: Emil Theodor Gleitsmann
- Successor: Gleitsmann Security Inks
- Headquarters: Dresden, Germany
- Area served: International
- Owner: Huber Group

E.T. Gleitsmann was a German producer of printing ink, founded in Dresden in 1847 by Emil Theodor Gleitsmann. It would later expand into an international network with branches in Austria (Vienna/Rabenstein), Hungary (Budapest), Italy (Turin) and Sweden (Trelleborg).

The headquarters moved to Berlin in 1953. It eventually became part of the Huber Group and changed its name to Gleitsmann Security Inks in 1998.

== Swedish factory ==
A factory in Trelleborg, Sweden was established in 1901. After World War II, it became independently owned in 1948, changing its name to G-Man. After a series of mergers and ownership changes the company is now a part of Flint Group.
