= Feliciotis =

Scientific classification
- Kingdom: Plantae
- Clade: Tracheophytes
- Clade: Angiosperms
- Clade: Eudicots
- Clade: Rosids
- Order: Myrtales
- Family: Melastomataceae
- Genus: Feliciotis; Ver.-Lib. & G.Kadereit (2020)

Species
- 12; see text

Genus of flowering plants

Feliciotis is a genus of flowering plants in the family Melastomataceae. It includes 12 species native to tropical Africa, ranging from Ghana to Kenya and south to Mozambique and Angola.

- Feliciotis alata (A.Fern. & R.Fern.) Ver.-Lib. & G.Kadereit
- Feliciotis chevalieri (Gilg ex Engl.) Ver.-Lib. & G.Kadereit
- Feliciotis cryptantha (Baker) Ver.-Lib. & G.Kadereit
- Feliciotis formosa (A.Fern. & R.Fern.) Ver.-Lib. & G.Kadereit
- Feliciotis gossweileri (Exell) Ver.-Lib. & G.Kadereit
- Feliciotis longisepala (A.Fern. & R.Fern.) Ver.-Lib. & G.Kadereit
- Feliciotis perkinsiae (Gilg) Ver.-Lib. & G.Kadereit
- Feliciotis pterocaulos (Wickens) Ver.-Lib. & G.Kadereit
- Feliciotis ruandensis (Engl.) Ver.-Lib. & G.Kadereit
- Feliciotis sessilicordata (Wickens) Ver.-Lib. & G.Kadereit
- Feliciotis simonis-jamesii (Buscal. & Muschl.) Ver.-Lib. & G.Kadereit
- Feliciotis speciosa (Taub.) Ver.-Lib. & G.Kadereit
