= Reserve Bank of Zimbabwe =

Central Bank of Zimbabwe

Coordinates: 17.8258°S 31.0491°E

- Central bank of: Zimbabwe
- Headquarters: New Reserve Bank Tower, Harare, Zimbabwe
- Ownership: 100% state ownership
- Governor: John Mushayavanhu
- Currency: Zimbabwe Gold; ZWG (ISO 4217)
- Reserves: 1.8 billion USD
- Bank rate: 27.5%
- Preceded by: Reserve Bank of Rhodesia
- Website: www.rbz.co.zw

The Reserve Bank of Zimbabwe (RBZ) is the central bank of Zimbabwe and is headquartered in the national capital, Harare.

== History ==
The bank traces its history to the Reserve Bank of Rhodesia, founded on 22 May 1964, but which succeeded the Bank of Rhodesia and Nyasaland (1956-1963) which had been liquidated at the collapse of the Federation of Rhodesia and Nyasaland in 1963. Prior to 1956, there was a Central African Currency Board from 1953, but which had been established as the Southern Rhodesia Currency Board in 1938 to provide Rhodesian currency, fully backed and bound to the British pound sterling at par face value. The local currency which Central African Currency Board was mandated to supply to Southern Rhodesia (colonial Zimbabwe), Northern Rhodesia (colonial Zambia) and Nyasaland (colonial Malawi) had been established through the Southern Rhodesia Coinage and Currency Act of 1932. The Reserve Bank of Rhodesia (which became the Reserve Bank of Zimbabwe at independence in 1980) has continued to function, and has grown in operations and staff, through a variety of changes in sovereignty and governmental structure in Rhodesia and Zimbabwe.

== Building location ==
For over four decades, the RBZ operated from the Reserve Bank Building along Samora Machel Avenue (formerly Jameson Avenue) adjacent to First Street. In the late 1980s, a competition was held to design the bank's new headquarters and the winning design was by Marjem Chatterton from Clinton & Evans and Architects; they went on to design the Reserve Bank of Malawi building as well. Construction of the new RBZ building began in 1993 and was fully completed in 1997, but was officially opened by President Robert Mugabe on May 31, 1996. The building, known at the New Reserve Bank Tower is the tallest in Harare standing at a height of 394 feet (120 m) with 28 floors above ground. It is expected to be exceeded in height by the new Mulk Tower in Mount Hampden.

== Structure and governors ==
The Reserve Bank of Zimbabwe Act provides for a board of directors and a governor. The governor, assisted by two deputy governors, is responsible for the day-to-day administration and operations of the bank. The current governor is John Mushayavanhu.

The governor and his two deputies are appointed by the president for five-year terms that may be renewed. The governor also serves as chairman of the board. The board's membership includes the three deputies and a maximum of seven other non-executive directors, intended to represent key sectors of the economy.

=== Governors of the Reserve Bank of Rhodesia ===
- Anthony Grafftey-Smith, 1956-1960
- B. C. J. Richards, 1960-1964
- Noel H. Bruce, 1964-1976
- Desmond Krogh, 1976-1980

=== Governors of the Reserve Bank of Zimbabwe ===
The Governor is appointed by the President of Zimbabwe for two renewable five-year-terms.

- Desmond Krogh, 1980 - 1983, transitional governor from Reserve Bank of Rhodesia
- Kombo James Moyana, 1983 - 1993, deputy in 1981
- Leonard Tsumba, 1993 - June 2003
- Charles Chikaura, June 2003 - December 2003, acting
- Gideon Gono, 2003-2013
- Charity Dhliwayo, 2013-2014, acting
- John Mangudya, 2014 - April 2024
- John Mushayavanhu, April 2024 -

== Key people ==
1. Dr. Jesimen T. Chipika, Deputy Governor
2. Dr. Innocent Matshe, Deputy Governor
3. Dr. Morris B. Mpofu, Executive Assistant to the Governor
4. Dr. Nebson Mupunga, Director - Economic Research, Modelling & Policy.
5. Mr. Azvinandaa Saburi, Director - Bank Operations and Currency Management
6. Mr. Farai Masendu, Director - Exchange Control Inspectorate and Compliance Enforcement
7. Mrs. Virginia Sithole, Bank Secretary and General Counsel
8. Mr. Philip T. Madamombe, Director - Bank Supervision Surveillance and Financial Sector
9. Mr. Cleopas Chiketa, Director - Human Resources
10. Mr. N. Nyemudzo, Director - Finance, Assets and Stores Management
11. Mr. C. Haparari, Director - ICT, Innovation Hub and Fintech
12. Mr. J. Mverecha, Director - Policy and Strategy
13. Dr. T. Chitauro, Director - Capital Flows, Administration, Accounting & Management
14. Mrs. M. Harry, Director-- Corporate Affairs
15. Mr. W. Nakunyada, Director - External Affairs and Stakeholder Engagement

== Operations ==
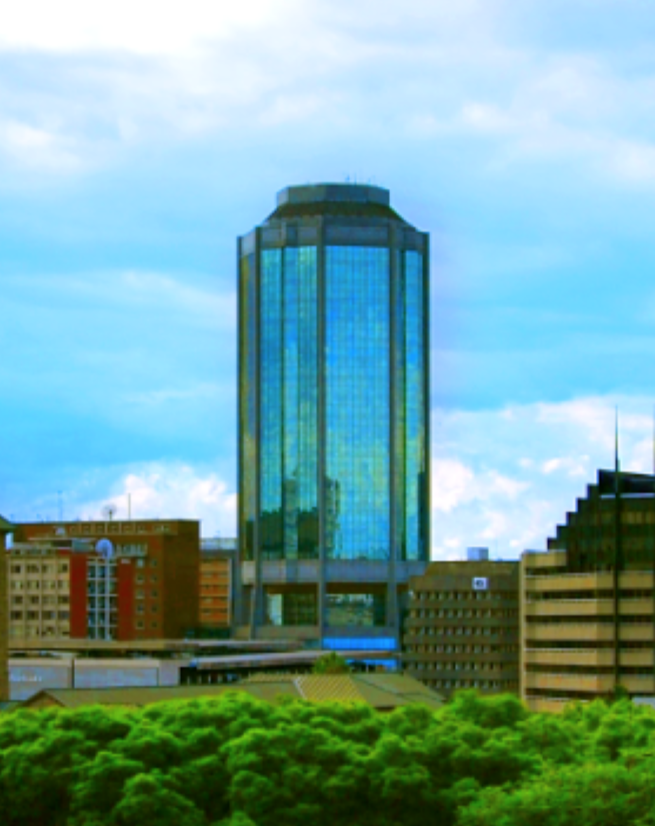
Headquarters of the Reserve Bank in Harare

The Reserve Bank's most important role is to create and enact monetary policies. According to the bank's website, as the only producer of Zimbabwe's bank notes and coins, it regulates the amount of money in circulation. However, since a range of foreign currencies is currently in use for domestic transactions, the bank's ability to control money supply is limited. The Reserve Bank also looks after the country's gold, as well as purchase and refine precious minerals like diamonds, gold and silver through its subsidiary Fidelity Printers and Refinery. The bank serves as an advisor to the government, providing the government with daily banking services. It is also active in promoting financial inclusion policy and is a member of the Alliance for Financial Inclusion.

=== Farm Mechanisation Programme ===
In 2007 and 2008, the Reserve Bank of Zimbabwe ran a programme which was stated to be designed to support commercial agriculture and the 'new' farmers that had resulted from the Fast-track land reform. The plan was to purchase agricultural equipment and distribute it to farmers by bank loans. It was called the Farm Mechanisation Programme. The stated purpose was to enhance productivity on the farms through mechanisation. The equipment included combine harvesters, tractors, disc ploughs, planters, harrows and generators. The bank established a US$200 million fund for the programme.

Unfortunately the main beneficiaries of the program were "well to do people (government Ministers, senior government officials, Judges among others)," people who had received large chunks of land under fast-track land reform. Equally unfortunate, many of the beneficiaries did not repay the loans. Rather than other remedies, the RBZ chose to seek a legislative solution, and eventually in 2015 the Reserve Bank of Zimbabwe Debt Assumption Act was passed where the government took over the debts of the RBZ, including the Farm Mechanisation Programme debts. The government later claimed that they were not loans but were subsidies.

Following in 2022 the government initiated a second RBZ Farm Mechanisation Programme called the Belarus programme as the equipment was provided from Belarus. The programme was in multiple phases, US$51 million in phase one, and US$52 million in phase two, with additional phases to come. In phase one 474 tractors, 60 combine harvesters, 210 planters and five lowbed trucks were distributed under loan agreements. The government indicated that the majority (98%) of those loans were repaid by the farmers.

== Relevancy ==
Due to the unstable economic conditions and failure to control inflation (2008), economists have suggested that the Reserve Bank be abolished. Some economists have suggested that the Reserve Bank of Zimbabwe be reformed. Legislation in 2008 was debated in the lower house of the Zimbabwean parliament with a view to limiting the so-called quasi-fiscal activities of the Reserve Bank.

== See also ==
- Banknotes of the Reserve Bank of Zimbabwe
- Commonwealth banknote-issuing institutions
- Economy of Zimbabwe
- Zimbabwean dollar
- Zimbabwe Gold
- Zimbabwe Mint
- Payment system
- Zimbabwean Bond Coins
- Real-time gross settlement
- Zimbabwean Bond Notes
- RTGS Dollar
- List of central banks of Africa
- List of central banks
- List of financial supervisory authorities by country
