= John Mushayavanhu =

Zimbabwean bank governor

John Mushayavanhu is a Zimbabwean central bank governor and former FBC Holdings Limited CEO. In 1997, Mushayavanhu joined FBC Bank as an executive director in the corporate banking division. In March 2024, he was appointed Governor of the Reserve Bank of Zimbabwe by President Emmerson Mnangagwa to replace John Mangudya.
