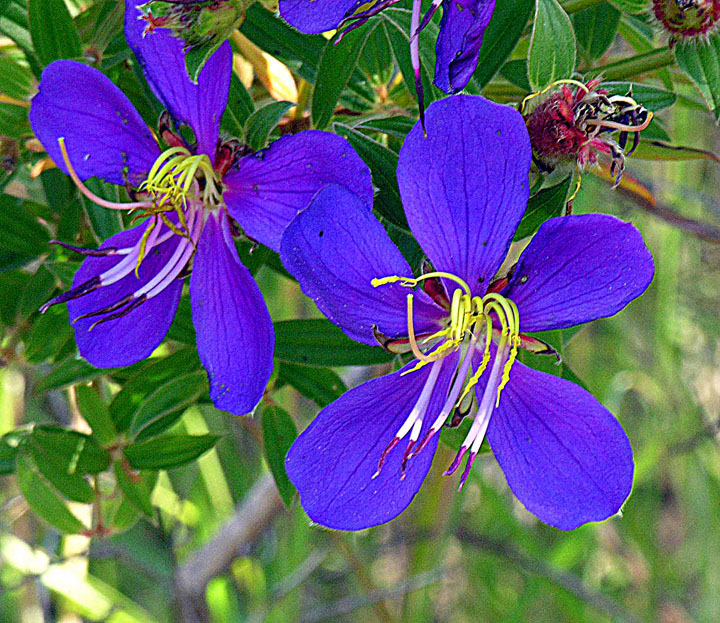
- Rosettea princeps

Scientific classification
- Kingdom: Plantae
- Clade: Tracheophytes
- Clade: Angiosperms
- Clade: Eudicots
- Clade: Rosids
- Order: Myrtales
- Family: Melastomataceae
- Genus: Rosettea; Ver.-Lib. & G.Kadereit (2020)

Species
- 21; see text

= Rosettea =

Genus of plants

Rosettea is a genus of plants in the family Melastomataceae. It includes 21 species native to tropical Africa.

- Rosettea aquatica (De Wild.) Ver.-Lib. & G.Kadereit
- Rosettea benguellensis (A.Fern. & R.Fern.) Ver.-Lib. & G.Kadereit
- Rosettea carrissoi (A.Fern. & R.Fern.) Ver.-Lib. & G.Kadereit
- Rosettea castroi (A.Fern. & R.Fern.) Ver.-Lib. & G.Kadereit
- Rosettea cordifolia (A.Fern. & R.Fern.) Ver.-Lib. & G.Kadereit
- Rosettea crenulata (Cogn.) Ver.-Lib. & G.Kadereit
- Rosettea denticulata (A.Fern. & R.Fern.) Ver.-Lib. & G.Kadereit
- Rosettea echinata (A.Fern. & R.Fern.) Ver.-Lib. & G.Kadereit
- Rosettea elliotii (Gilg) Ver.-Lib. & G.Kadereit
- Rosettea falcipila (Gilg) Ver.-Lib. & G.Kadereit
- Rosettea longicaudata (Cogn.) Ver.-Lib. & G.Kadereit
- Rosettea louisii (Jacq.-Fél.) Ver.-Lib. & G.Kadereit
- Rosettea peregrina (A.Fern. & R.Fern.) Ver.-Lib. & G.Kadereit
- Rosettea princeps (Kunth) Ver.-Lib. & G.Kadereit
- Rosettea pulchra (A.Fern. & R.Fern.) Ver.-Lib. & G.Kadereit
- Rosettea rhinanthifolia (Brenan) Ver.-Lib. & G.Kadereit
- Rosettea riparia (Gilg & Ledermann ex Engl.) Ver.-Lib. & G.Kadereit
- Rosettea scabra (Gilg) Ver.-Lib. & G.Kadereit
- Rosettea sizenandoi (Cogn.) Ver.-Lib. & G.Kadereit
- Rosettea thollonii (Cogn.) Ver.-Lib. & G.Kadereit
- Rosettea trothae (Gilg) Ver.-Lib. & G.Kadereit
