= Optically variable ink =

Anti-counterfeiting measure

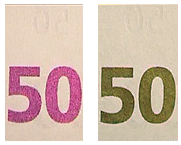
50 euro note details, seen from different angles. "50" was printed with OVI.

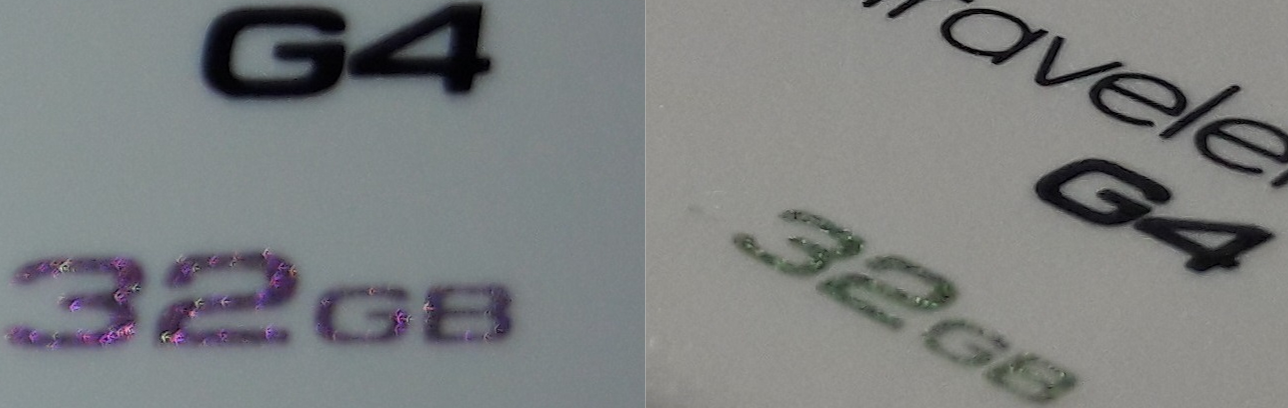
Optically variable ink used in popular USB drives that are often subject to counterfeiting. Taken from 2 different angles.

Optically variable ink (OVI), also called color shifting ink, is an anti-counterfeiting measure used on many major modern banknotes, as well as on other official documents (professional licenses, for example).

The ink displays two distinct colors depending on the angle the bill is viewed at. The United States fifty-dollar bill, for example, uses color shifting ink for the numeral 50 so that it displays copper at one angle and bright green in another.

OVI is particularly useful as an anti-counterfeiting measure as it is not widely available, and it is used on security printing. One major manufacturer is a Swiss company called SICPA (Société Industrielle et Commerciale de Produits pour l'Agriculture). Additional suppliers include German company Gleitsmann Security Inks, Sun Chemical (through their Brand Protection Division based in Manchester, UK), and the Swiss company Printcolor AG, located in Berikon, Switzerland.

Color-shifting inks reflect various wavelengths in white light differently, depending on the angle of incidence to the surface. An unaided eye will observe this effect as a change of color while the viewing angle is changed. A color copier or scanner can copy a document only at one fixed angle relative to the document's surface. It uses finely powdered pearlescent glitter or flakes of mica or an electrically insulating material such as resins or plastics with at least two metal-based, optically reflective compounds on top deposited by physical vapor deposition, that cause light interference. It is similar to paint containing ChromaFlair pigment.

== Optically variable magnetic ink ==
Optically variable magnetic ink (OVMI) has visual effects that are based on the magnetic properties of the ink. When the document is tilted, movement of a bright light stripe occurs and the colour changes. It is usually applied by screen printing. This type of ink is used for the Euro, Brazilian real, and Russian ruble banknotes.
