= Eleotis =

Scientific classification
- Kingdom: Plantae
- Clade: Tracheophytes
- Clade: Angiosperms
- Clade: Eudicots
- Clade: Rosids
- Order: Myrtales
- Family: Melastomataceae
- Genus: Eleotis; Ver.-Lib. & R.D.Stone (2020)

Species
- Eleotis anchietae (A.Fern. & R.Fern.) Ver.-Lib. & R.D.Stone; Eleotis brazzae (Cogn.) Ver.-Lib. & R.D.Stone; Eleotis buraeavii (Cogn.) Ver.-Lib. & R.D.Stone; Eleotis welwitschii (Cogn.) Ver.-Lib. & R.D.Stone

Genus of plants

Eleotis is a genus of flowering plants in family Melastomataceae. It includes four species native to central Africa, ranging from Republic of the Congo and Democratic Republic of the Congo to Angola and Zambia.
