= Pyrotis =

Scientific classification
- Kingdom: Plantae
- Clade: Tracheophytes
- Clade: Angiosperms
- Clade: Eudicots
- Clade: Rosids
- Order: Myrtales
- Family: Melastomataceae
- Genus: Pyrotis; Ver.-Lib. & R.D.Stone (2020)
- Species: P. gilgiana

Binomial name
- Pyrotis gilgiana (De Wild.) Ver.-Lib. & R.D.Stone (2020)

Varieties
- Pyrotis gilgiana var. gilgiana; Pyrotis gilgiana var. petiolata (De Wild.) Ver.-Lib. & R.D.Stone; Pyrotis gilgiana var. witteana (Jacq.-Fél.) Ver.-Lib. & R.D.Stone

Synonyms
- Dissotis gilgiana De Wild. (1903)

Genus of flowering plants

Pyrotis gilgiana is a species of flowering plant in family Melastomataceae. It is a perennial herb up to 45 cm. tall which is native to Democratic Republic of the Congo and Zambia in central Africa. It is the sole species in genus Pyrotis. It was first described as Dissotis gilgiana in 1903.
