= Desmond Krogh =

South African banker and economist (1931–2019)

Desmond Charles Krogh

Governor of the Reserve Bank of Zimbabwe
- In office 1980–1993
- Preceded by: himself
- Succeeded by: James Kombo Moyana

Governor of the Reserve Bank of Rhodesia
- In office 1976–1980
- Preceded by: Noel H. Bruce
- Succeeded by: himself

Personal details
- Born: 19 July 1931 Windhoek, South West Africa (now Namibia)
- Died: 2019 (aged 87–88)
- Spouse: Surine Groenewald

Desmond Charles Krogh (19 July 1931 – 2019) was a South African banker and economist. He was the last governor of the Reserve Bank of Rhodesia, and the first governor of the Reserve Bank of Zimbabwe from 1976 to 1983.

Krogh was born on 19 July 1931 in Windhoek, South West Africa (now Namibia).

Krogh graduated from University of Cape Town. He was professor of economics in University of South Africa from 1962 to 1969. He was appointed as assistant economic adviser to the Prime Minister of Rhodesia in 1961. He was a member of the economic advisory council of Prime Minister Ian Smith. Krogh was appointed as deputy governor of Reserve Bank of Rhodesia from 1974 to 1976, and appointed as governor in 1976 for a term of seven years.

He died in 2019.
