= New Reserve Bank Tower =

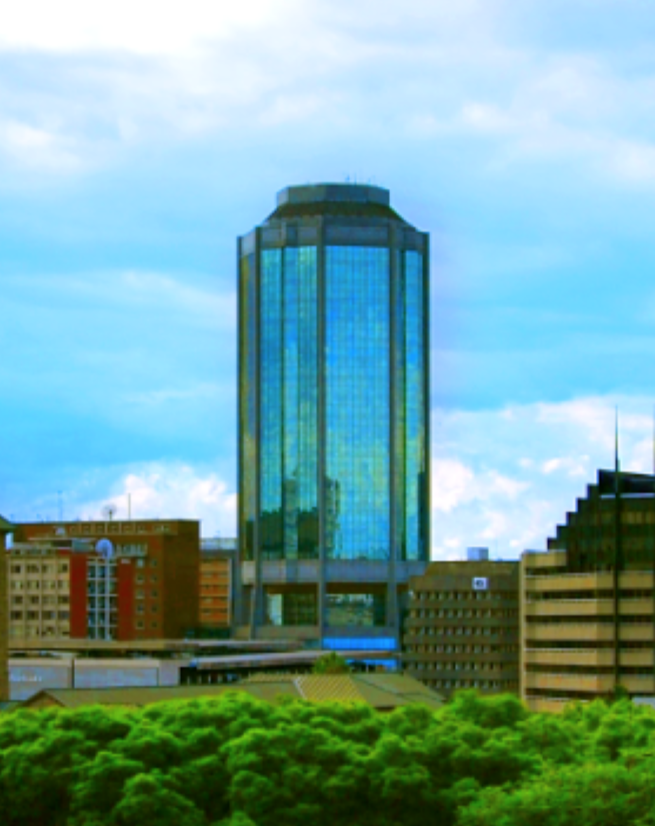
- Interactive map of the New Reserve Bank Tower area

General information
- Status: Completed
- Type: Office
- Location: 80 Samora Machel Avenue, Harare, Zimbabwe
- Construction started: 1993
- Completed: 1997
- Opening: 1998
- Owner: Reserve Bank of Zimbabwe

Height
- Roof: 120 metres (390 ft)

Technical details
- Floor count: 28
- Lifts/elevators: 7

Design and construction
- Architects: Clinton & Evans

The New Reserve Bank Tower (New Reserve Bank of Zimbabwe) is a 28-story office skyscraper in Harare, Zimbabwe. At 120 m (394 ft), it is the tallest building in Zimbabwe since its completion in 1997, and is currently the 89th tallest building in Africa. It serves as the headquarters of the Reserve Bank of Zimbabwe.
