= Daramombe =

Boarding mission school in Zimbabwe

Location
- Mashonaland East Province; Zimbabwe

Information
- School type: Boarding Mission School
- Religious affiliation(s): Anglicanism
- Established: 1939; 86 years ago
- Gender: Boys (1939-1976); Mixed (1976-Present)

Christ the King Daramombe, is an Anglican mission school in Mashonaland East Province, Zimbabwe, located at the eastern end of the Daramombe Hills, about 45 kilometres (28 miles) from Chivhu and 7 kilometres (4.3 miles) from the Chivhu–Murambinda Highway (Murambinda). It is a boarding school which also serves day scholars from surrounding villages.

School activities at Daramombe are founded on four pillars: Academics, Sport, Christianity and Culture. The school has excelled in all four of these areas and has subsequently produced well-rounded pupils capable of entering a wide variety of careers. The school motto is "...and some fell on rich soil" taken from the Parable of the Sower. It is a parable of Jesus found in the three Synoptic Gospels in Matthew 13:1-23, Mark 4:1-20, and Luke 8:4-15 where Jesus tells of a farmer who sows seed and does so indiscriminately. Some seed falls on the path (wayside) with no soil, some on rocky ground with little soil, some on soil which contains thorns, and some on good soil. In the first three cases, the seed is taken away or fails to produce a crop, but when it falls on good soil it grows, yielding thirty, sixty, or a hundredfold. In context with schools' motto, Daramombe High School is the good soil and the seed represents the students.

== History ==
=== Colonial era ===
The school was established in 1939 by missionaries from England. It started as an institution that taught Africans the Bible, farming as well as the Christian way of living. Part of the group of the missionaries included Rev Tony Shaw who later become one of the long serving Priest-In-Charge of the Mission throughout the 1940s and into the 1950s as well. The school was still an all-boys school only offering places to male students. In 1955, the school later added a teachers college portfolio within which meant to serve students who wanted pursue teaching as a career. During this period the school increased its enrollment from 120 students to about 200%. However, much of the progress that the school had made was destroyed by the liberation struggle in the '70s .The school lost much of its infrastructure as well as personnel that decided to join the arms' struggle. In 1976, the school reopened and for the first time it opened its doors to female students.

=== Mujuru era ===
The school, which was destroyed by the liberation struggle in the 1970s, was brought to modern standards by the former headmaster Simon Mujuru. When Mujuru joined the school, it had a pass rate of about 30 percent and it was raised to 99.6 percent during his time. In 1994, under the Mujuru era, the school was electrified and science labs were established among other major developments. In 2000, the A level was introduced. The school has been known to qualify in top-twenty schools in both A level and O Level. Daramombe was the first public school to introduce computer studies in Zimbabwe in 1995.

Students sat for both University of Cambridge International Examinations and Pitman exams in their final year of ordinary level. In December 2006, Mujuru left his post as the headmaster and was later promoted to the District Head for Chikomba District (DEO) around mid-2007. Since Mujuru's departure the school has changed School heads numerous times. This constant change of school heads saw the school's standards deteriorate to an all-time low. For a school that was always in the Zimbabwe's Top 10 best schools since 1990, as of 2013 the school's overall performance in the national examinations has been dismal. The Anglican Diocese of Masvingo accused Mujuru of frustrating headmasters recommended to him by the Diocese to portray the Church as failing to run the institution in order to influence government to take over the school. Much of the school's problems is attributed to property dispute that took place when the Anglican Church split.

=== Property dispute ===
In 2011, Anglican Bishop Nolbert Kunonga, who left the Church of the Province of Central Africa (CPCA) to form his own Anglican Church in Zimbabwe in 2007, took over the Daramombe Mission through a 2009 Supreme Court of Zimbabwe judgment. With the help of the deputy sheriff, Kunonga's camp evicted the mission's clergy, teachers and nurses manning the institution's clinic. Those evicted were replaced by Kunonga's faithfuls from within the mission and also outsiders. Within days after taking over the mission, Kunonga appointed his new high school head, primary school head, priest in charge and head nurse.

Daramombe Mission was first under the Diocese of Harare before being gifted to the Diocese of Masvingo by the church in the early 2000s. Masvingo did not have a big institution like Daramombe. Kunonga's argument was that the decision to take the Mission to the Diocese of Masvingo was financially motivated, so when he has won 2009 Supreme Court of Zimbabwe judgment that allowed him to control the Diocese of Harare churches, he felt Daramombe had to be returned back to Harare, hence the dispute.

In November 2012, Kunonga ultimately lost the dispute between him and the CPCA Bishop Chad Gandiya at the Supreme Court. The high court threw out five separate appeals by Kunonga's Church of the Province of Zimbabwe leaving the court to determine the outstanding two decisive matters in his battle for control of Anglican church property. With this decision, the mission was surrendered back to the CPCA.

== Campus ==
The school campus is in the middle of an approximately 1200ha of farmland that the school owns and is a closed campus with church buildings, sports fields and other facilities spread over the area. The school is surrounded by many villages which include Badza, Chafa, Maisiri, Manjengwa, Mudavanhu and Muchenje. The Daramombe mountain range stretches from the Hokonya area down to Gokomere. Alongside this range runs the Mwerahari River.

=== Christ the King Church ===
The church, dedicated to Jesus Christ and named Christ The King is at the heart of the school atop a hill. The design for the church is in the early simple single-nave undomed basilica manner. At the west end the baptistry is placed projecting westward of the wall and forming a semi-circular recess. As far as possible local material was used. The walls throughout were built with local bricks and stone with a rough face, both inside and out. This brick demands a simple treatment for the dressings so that most of the windows are plain but those around the apse include some effective tracery.

The church is open to both the students and the general public and the students do have their church services on weekends separately early in the morning. The church also acts as a path to spiritual education to the students whose purpose is to fulfill the divine potential of children, and to prepare them for life by giving them the tools they need to keep on learning throughout the many experiences that will come to them.

=== Boarding houses ===
Nine houses comprises the school:

- Highlands (boys)
- Midlands (boys)
- Lowlands (boys)
- Upper 6 Complex (boys)
- New hostel* (boys)
- Convent (girls)
- Female (girls)
- Upper 6 Complex (girls)
- New hostel* (girls)

=== Clinic ===
One of the major asset of the school, the Daramombe clinic is located within the campus and its easy to access for the students. Treatment for students is free, however in terms of major treatments that the clinic may not be able to offer, students are subjected to transfers to major hospitals at a cost.The Clinic has a bed capacity of 22 beds. It has an outpatient, female ward, male ward, children's ward, a maternity wing and a house at box level. The Clinic offers services to both school children and members of staff. Just like the church, the clinic is also open to the general public offering other services such as the separate maternity home built by the Mother's Union.

=== Computer Village ===
Daramombe being the first public school to provide computer science lessons in Zimbabwe reached another milestone by being the first school to have a computer village that is a first of its kind in Zimbabwe. The new facility will see the school providing enhanced computer studies as well as better student computer interface.

== Curriculum ==
The school follows the curriculum set by the Zimbabwe Schools Examination Council (ZIMSEC), which is the curriculum followed by most schools in Zimbabwe. Every O Level student is required by the school, with regards to the ZIMSEC curriculum as of 2017, to study 5 (five) compulsory subjects which are English Language, ChiShona, Mathematics, General Science, Agriculture. In addition to these, a student is allowed to register any of the following subjects, Chemistry, Computer Science, Accounting, Biology, Physics, Geography, Literature in English, History. A Level students enroll under three sections which are Arts, Sciences or Commercials. Students can also do subjects from different sections if it is available as a combination at the school.

== Sporting activities ==
Daramombe High School offers a wide variety of team and social sports from which learners can choose. These include the standard sports such as netball, tennis, cross country, athletics, football, rugby and basketball. Beyond these sports, Daramombe High School offers competitive chess.

== Notable alumni ==
- Gideon Gono – former Governor of the Reserve Bank of Zimbabwe
- Charles Mungoshi – writer

== See also ==
- Christianity in Zimbabwe
- Education in Zimbabwe
- List of boarding schools
- List of schools in Zimbabwe
