= Edmund Powell =

English Bishop

Edmund Nathanael Powell (2 September 1859 – 11 April 1928) was Bishop of Mashonaland from 1908 to 1910.

He was born in Buckhurst Hill, educated at Winchester and Trinity College, Oxford and ordained in 1884. His first post was a curacy in Chelmsford after which he was Priest in charge of the Beckton Mission. He was then Vicar of St Stephen, Upton Park before his elevation to the episcopate. At some point, he gained a Doctorate of Divinity (DD).

On his return to England he held further Incumbencies at St Saviour, Poplar and St Nicholas Castle Hedingham.

Religious titles
Preceded by William Gaul	Bishop of Mashonaland; 1908–1910	Succeeded by Frederic Beaven
