= Peter Hatendi =

Ralph Peter Hatendi DD AKC (9 April 1927 – 31 August 2018) was a Zimbabwean Church of England priest who served as bishop of Harare and Mashonaland from 1979 until his retirement in 1995. He was the first indigenous Black Zimbabwean to hold this position, and played an important role in helping the church navigate the transition in the 1980s following Zimbabwe's independence.

== Early life & Career ==
Hatendi was born on 9 April 1927 in Rusape, a town in Manicaland province in eastern Zimbabwe (then Southern Rhodesia), to Fabian and Emilia Hatendi. He was educated at St Augustine's College, a mission school in Penhalonga, and then from 1952-1954 worked as a teacher at a school in Marandellas. After training for the ministry at St Peter's College, Rosettenville in South Africa, Hatendi was ordained in 1958 and began working as an assistant priest in the Dioceses of Harare and Mutare from 1958 - 1961. This was followed by a stint as chaplain at Bernard Mzeki Mission from 1961-1962.

In 1963 Hatendi, his wife and their five children moved to Tetford, Lincolnshire, United Kingdom, where he served as a curate in the Diocese of Lincoln. In 1965 the family moved to Isle of Dogs, London, so that Hatendi could take up a role in a local parish. In 1968 he graduated from King's College London with a Licentiate in Theology and an Associateship of Kings College award (AKC).

In 1969 Hatendi and his family moved to Lusaka, Zambia. His roles here included seminary tutor at St John's Seminary and executive secretary of the Bible Society of Zambia. He then assumed a role with United Bible Societies in Nairobi, Kenya, from 1976-1978.

In 1979 Hatendi was appointed suffragan Bishop of the Diocese of Harare, then Bishop of the Diocese of Harare in 1981. He held this role until his retirement in 1995. He later came out of retirement to serve as Interim Bishop of Manicaland from 2008 until 2009.

Since 1984, Hatendi served as a governmental electoral supervisory commissioner.

In 1987 Hatendi was awarded a Doctor of Divinity by The World University in Benson, Arizona.

== Death and legacy ==
Hatendi died at age 91 on 31 August 2018 of chronic lung and heart problems. His funeral took place four days later at the Cathedral of St Mary and All Saints in Harare. His body was cremated and his ashes laid to rest within the cathedral.

== Personal life ==
In the 1950s Hatendi married Jane Mary Chikumbu (d. 2020), a fellow schoolteacher from the eastern region of Zimbabwe. Together they raised five children: Nesta, Felicity, Philip, Pauline and Peter. They were survived by four of their children, eleven grandchildren and seven great-grandchildren.

Anglican Communion titles
Preceded by John Paul Burrough	Bishop of Harare and Mashonaland; 1979–1995	Succeeded by Jonathan Siyachitema
