= Gideon Gono =

Zimbabwean banker

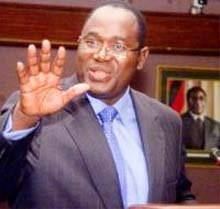
- Gono after speaking to Parliament in 2008

4th Governor of the Reserve Bank of Zimbabwe
- In office 1 December 2003 – 30 November 2013
- President: Robert Mugabe
- Preceded by: Leonard Tsumba
- Succeeded by: Charity Dhliwayo

Personal details
- Born: 29 November 1959 (age 66) Rhodesia and Nyasaland
- Spouse: Helen Gono
- Education: University of Zimbabwe
- Profession: Banker

Gideon Gono (born 29 November 1959) is a former governor of the Reserve Bank of Zimbabwe, serving from 2003 to 2013, and is the former CEO of the CBZ Bank Limited.

Gono became known internationally due to his connection to the hyperinflation in Zimbabwe.

== Earlier career and education ==
Gideon Gono went to Daramombe High School in Chivhu, an Anglican Mission school. He started his career as a tea boy at National Breweries in Que Que in 1977. He put himself through correspondence courses from O-Level through A-Level and moved on to the Zimbabwe Fertiliser Company as a bookkeeper. After working at Van Leer Packaging as an accountant, he was appointed as finance manager at the Zimbabwe Development Bank (ZDB) in 1987, rising to the post of general manager.

In 1995, Gono was appointed managing director of the Bank of Credit and Commerce of Zimbabwe (BCCZ). Under his direction BCCZ became the largest and most successful bank in Zimbabwe, The Commercial Bank of Zimbabwe, or as he coined it, 'Jewel Bank'. He was subsequently appointed as governor of the Reserve Bank of Zimbabwe.

He obtained a master's degree in Business Administration at the University of Zimbabwe and went on to lecture there and head the university council. He was awarded an honorary degree at the same institution. He then went on to earn another PhD in Strategic Management in 2007 from Atlantic International University. However, Atlantic International University has been characterized as a degree mill, and its degrees had been widely dismissed as "fake."

== Reserve Bank governorship ==
Gono was first appointed as governor of the Reserve Bank in November 2003 because of his reputation as a turnaround specialist, particularly because of his work at the Commercial Bank of Zimbabwe. In November 2008, Gono was reappointed to a new five-year term as governor, beginning on 1 December 2008. Gono stepped down on 30 November 2013 after a 10-year term at the helm of the Reserve Bank.

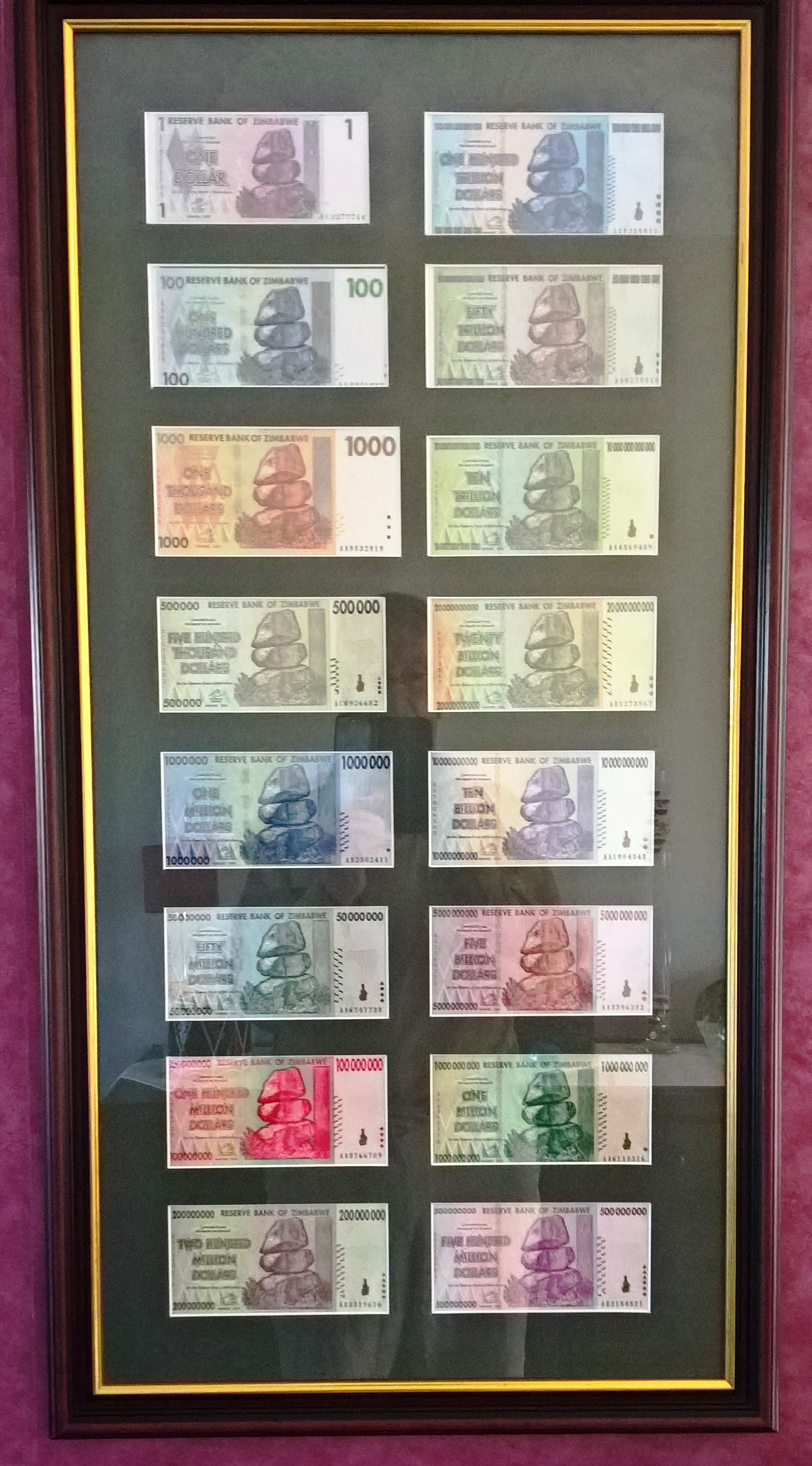
Selection of 16 original un-circulated Zimbabwe notes ranging in denomination from 1 dollar to 100 trillion dollars. They are all signed by G Gono, the Governor of the Reserve Bank of Zimbabwe, in the period 2007 to 2008, who promises "to pay the bearer on demand". In 2007 Gideon Gono gained a PhD in Strategic Management from the Atlantic International University.

=== Results of policies ===
After taking over the governorship of the Reserve Bank of Zimbabwe, Gono implemented a host of highly criticized policies in a bid to try to keep the Zimbabwean dollar afloat. There were a host of problems before he became governor, hence the appointment of turnaround strategies but they seemed to be too much for him to tackle, hence the decline of the economy continued:

- Cash shortages
- There were fuel and shortages in agriculture
- Corrupt businessmen were arrested and banks not adhering to banking laws were penalized
- The highest inflation in the world and unemployment and the collapse of the health, education and agriculture sectors.

=== Zimbabwe Dollar and inflation ===
The RBZ printed large quantities of money to keep the economy afloat against the backdrop of economic sanctions placed upon the Zimbabwe since 2000. This went against the advice of global economists, but with full support from President Robert Mugabe. As predicted by the textbook quantity theory of money, this practice devalued the Zimbabwean dollar and caused hyperinflation.

The RBZ demonetized old bank notes on 1 August 2006 and introduced a new currency. Each new Zimbabwe dollar was worth 1000 old Zimbabwe dollars. The highest denominations for the new currency were 1, 10, and 100 thousand revalued dollars. A year later on 1 August 2007, he authorized a 200 thousand dollar denomination. This marked the start of a series of new denominations issued in rapid succession, including 250, 500, and 750 thousand dollars (20 December 2007); 1, 5, and 10 million dollars (16 January 2008); 25 and 50 million dollars (4 April 2008); 100 and 250 million dollars (5 May 2008); 500 million and 5, 25, and 50 billion dollars (20 May 2008); and 100 billion dollars (21 July 2008). From the time of currency revaluation to the beginning of June 2008 the money supply in the country increased from billion to more than quadrillion, or a 20,000,000 fold increase.

Gono denied media claims that he had opposed price cuts that the government instituted to arrest inflation. As time went by, it became apparent that the RBZ had instituted price cuts that saw bare shelves in shops and many businesses closing. He sent in the police to arrest businessmen for failing to reduce their prices. On one occasion, he personally visited shop owners in Harare to demand they lower prices. Despite these efforts, inflation in Zimbabwe remains the world's highest. (Note: after dollarization in 2009, Zimbabwe's inflation rate has become deflation since 2014.)

Critics have noted that most of Gono's monetary policy statements in the past have had biblical references. Notably, he usually ends in policy statements to the Parliament of Zimbabwe thus: "In the Lord's hands, I commit this Monetary Policy Framework for our economic turnaround."

=== Banks and currency exchange ===
A number of banks that were skirting banking laws had their operating licenses cancelled and/or were placed under curatorship. Critics blame Gono for closing 16 money transfer agencies.

=== Agriculture sector ===
With the shortages of inputs in the agriculture the RBZ came to the forefront to try to bail the sector out by helping with fertilizer and machinery procurement.

Backed by vice president Joyce Mujuru, Gono has several times called for an end to the farm invasions sanctioned by the ZANU-PF party, as these destroy the Zimbabwean economy. Gono's criticism of farm takeovers is in sharp contrast to statements made by other ministers, including Lands Minister Didymus Mutasa.

In an interview with the state-controlled The Herald newspaper, he said, "I have openly condemned such retrogressive acts as destruction of horticultural greenhouses, decimation of tobacco barns, institution of fresh farm invasions". "There are too many subdivisions among us, too many contradictions, too much infighting among ourselves, incredible suspicion and mistrust of one another," Gono said.

Gono admitted that his efforts to rescue and improve the economy of Zimbabwe were being thwarted and risked failure. Gono said there were several factors that were outside the central bank's control, which made it difficult to reign in inflation.

"Some of those factors are within the governor's control and influence while others such as politics, sanctions, droughts, under-utilisation of farms, disruptions at those farms, rampant corruption, indiscipline, law and order are factors outside the governor's control," he said in an interview with The Herald newspaper. He has also blamed the failure of the economy on sanctions imposed on the country, a charge critics dispute.

Critics allege that Gono has kept his job as the governor mainly through Mugabe's patronage saying Mugabe has not only shielded Gono from critics, but has commended him in his activities as governor despite the extreme deterioration of the Zimbabwean economy. He had been Mugabe's banker for a long period before becoming governor of the RBZ.

== Personal life ==
Like many of Mugabe's inner circle, Gono allegedly owns several farms (one of which is in Norton). However, unlike others, he is said to have bought and paid for it in the late 1990s before the land redistribution program in which other farms were confiscated from localised white farmers.

In November 2008, Gono published a book titled Zimbabwe's Casino Economy: Extra-ordinary Measures for Extra-ordinary Challenges describing the post-colonial economy of Zimbabwe particularly during the first five years (2003–2008) of his term as Governor of the Reserve Bank of Zimbabwe (RBZ).

On 24 October 2010, the South-African newspaper Sunday Times ran a story falsely claiming that he had an affair with Amai Grace Mugabe, the wife of the late President Robert Mugabe. It was later reported that the story could have been made up as a part of internal fighting inside the ruling party or the RBZ.

=== Personal sanctions ===
Gono is banned from traveling to the United States because of his then influential position in government-owned institutions in Zimbabwe, namely the Commercial Bank of Zimbabwe where he was the CEO and subsequently, the Central Bank where he was the Governor of the Reserve Bank of Zimbabwe. He was added to and subsequently removed from the EU's list of individuals subject to personal sanctions and the ban on travel to the EU was lifted in 2013 after he retired from Government service. He however is still on the US sanctions list. He had no assets frozen by the EU sanctions.

== Awards ==
In 2009, Gono was awarded the Ig Nobel Prize in Mathematics "for giving people a simple way to deal with a wide range of numbers" by having his bank print notes with denominations ranging from one cent to one hundred trillion dollars.

== See also ==
- List of individuals banned from entering the United Kingdom, a list Gono is on
