= Newborough, Staffordshire =

Village in Staffordshire, England

Coordinates: 52.82455°N 1.805291°W

Newborough
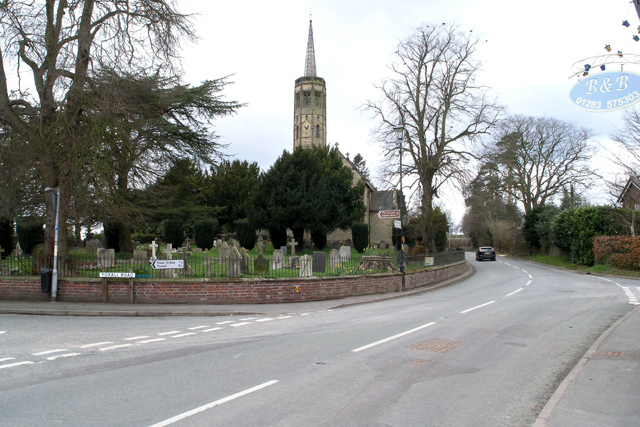
- Newborough Church

- Location within Staffordshire
- Population: 476 (2011)
- OS grid reference: SK1443124560
- Civil parish: Newborough
- District: East Staffordshire
- Shire county: Staffordshire
- Region: West Midlands
- Country: England
- Sovereign state: United Kingdom
- Post town: Burton-on-Trent
- Postcode district: DE13
- Police: Staffordshire
- Fire: Staffordshire
- Ambulance: West Midlands
- UK Parliament: Lichfield

Newborough is a village and civil parish in the county of Staffordshire, England. It is located 3 miles (5 km) south west of Hanbury and 8 miles (13 km) west of Burton-upon-Trent. Newborough has a pub, a school and a church. At the 2011 UK census, the population stood at 476, comprising 240 males and 236 females. Newborough is part of the Yoxall ward of East Staffordshire.

== The Village ==
The local church is dedicated to All Saints. The current building was consecrated in 1901, after being built by the architect John Oldrid Scott. Originally built on the site of a pub, it was built using stone from Hollington, Pateley Bridge and Harrogate. The Church is a Grade II listed building, after being listed on 12 January 1966, and given its English Heritage Building ID of 273885.

The village originally had three public houses in the village: The White Hart, The Buffalo and The Red Lion, although it had many more alehouses. The Red Lion continues its trade to this day, but the present day All Saints church stands on the site of the White Hart. The Buffalo is now a residential home of the same name, and houses now stand on the old car park.

Each year, the village holds a Well dressing event on the May Bank Holiday. The tradition in the village only dates back to 1978, but the ancient tradition is thought to have originated in Pagan times. The wells in the village are decorated, and as described on the village's website, each year the residents use "wooden boards [which] are filled with soft, wet clay on which a design is picked out and then coloured using petals and other natural materials such as leaves, cones and bark".

== History ==
Agardsely was the original name for Newborough. The name Agardsely is derived from the Anglo-Saxon personal name Eadgar + leah or leage meaning 'Eadgar's pasture'; the name is recorded as Eadgares leye in 1004, as Edgareslege in the Domesday Book of 1086, and as Adgaresle, Addegaresleye in the 13th century. The village was renamed Newborough in 1263, after the 6th Earl of Derby, Robert de Ferrers, created a new borough. The name Newborough is recorded as Neuboreg in the 13th century and as Newburgh and Novo Burgo in the 14th century.

The civil parish of Newborough was established in 1866, after previously being part of the Hanbury parish district. According to William White, who wrote about Hanbury as part of the History, Gazetteer and Directory of Staffordshire in 1851, the parish extended to "upwards of five miles square, and including the north end of Needwood Forest, and ten villages and hamlets, divided into five townships, viz, Hanbury, Newborough, Marchington, Marchington-Woodlands, and Draycott-in-the-Clay", while it also included "2483 inhabitants, and about 13,600 acres of land".

=== Population ===
Year of census	Total Population
1881	651
1891	574
1901	566
1911	521
1921	496
1931	493
1951	512
1961	459

The UK national census revealed that in 1881, the total population for the parish was 651, and since then, the population has steadily declined. Only in the period between the 1931 and 1951 censuses did the population increase (from 493 to 512), however there was then a large drop in population for the 1961 census, where it decreased to 459.

=== Occupation ===
The 1881 Census gives an insight into what sort of occupations the villagers had at the time of the census. Most are employed in the agricultural sector, with 111 men in this occupational area. For women, the picture is less clear with the majority being listed as either 'Persons without Specified Occupations' or 'Unknown Occupation'.

Occupation Data from 1881 Census
Occupation Group	Male	Female
General/Local Government	11	–
Defence of the Country	3	–
Professionals	1	2
Domestic Service or Offices	10	25
Commercial Occupations	1	–
Transport & Communications	4	–
Agriculture	111	6
Animals	1	–
Workers in House, Furniture & Decorations	2	–
Workers in Carriages & Harnesses	2	–
Workers in Food & Lodging	4	1
Workers in Dress	3	8
Workers in Various Mineral Substances	5	–
Persons without Specified Occupations	1	56
Unknown Occupation	2	63

=== Housing ===
Over time, the total number of houses in Newborough has fluctuated. Between 1881 and 1921, the total number of houses has slowly decreased (from 150 to 113), and then it has slowly risen again. The most recent data from the 2001 UK Census showed that there were 173 households. Of these 173 houses, 50 of them were categorised as "couple households with dependent children" and 43 of them were labelled "couple households with no children".

Year of census	Total Houses
1881	150
1891	146
1901	137
1911	121
1921	113
1931	122
1951	138
1961	140

== Notable people ==
- Charles Marlow (1814 in Thorney Lanes - 1882) an English jockey, known for his honesty and integrity and remembered for his association with the horse The Flying Dutchman, on which he won the Derby and St. Leger.
- Frederic Beaven (1855–1941) vicar of All Saints', Newborough, 1881–85 and later Bishop of Mashonaland 1911-1925

== See also ==
- Listed buildings in Newborough, Staffordshire
