= Patrick Murindagomo =

Patrick Murindagomo (died 1978) was an Anglican bishop in Zimbabwe then called Rhodesia.

Murindagomo was born in Mhondoro. He was ordained deacon in 1953 and priest in 1954. He served in the Diocese of Mashonaland and became the Archdeacon of Salisbury, now Harare in 1965. He was consecrated Suffragan Bishop of Mashonaland in the Cathedral of St Mary and All Saints on 25 January 1973. He died in 1978.
