= Farai Mutamiri =

Zimbabwean Anglican bishop

Farai Mutamiri is an Anglican bishop in Zimbabwe. He was appointed Bishop of Harare in 2019.

Mutamiri was born on 8 October 1968. He began working in industry as a production line supervisor. He trained for ordination at Bishop Gaul Theological College in Harare and was ordained deacon in 1998 and priest in 1999. After serving as a parish priest, he was Dean of St Mary and All Angels Cathedral in Harare from 2008 to 2018.
