= Paul Burrough =

British Anglican bishop

John Paul Burrough MBE (5 May 1916 – 27 January 2003) was Bishop of Mashonaland from 1968 to 1981.

== Background ==
He was born into an ecclesiastical family on 5 May 1916 and educated at St Edward's School, Oxford, and St Edmund Hall, Oxford. He was a skilled rower and was in the Oxford crews that beat Cambridge in the Boat Races of 1937 and 1938.

During the Second World War, he was commissioned in 1940 into the Royal Signals. In 1942 he became a prisoner of war in Malaya. In 1946 he was appointed a member of the military division of the Order of the British Empire (MBE) for his leadership in the PoW camps.

Ordained in 1951, his first post was a curacy in Aldershot. After this he was a missionary priest in Korea and then (his final post before elevation to the episcopate) Anglican chaplain to overseas peoples in Birmingham. During this time he brought together a successful Trinidadian steel band and enabled them to find engagements, including a regular annual performance at the summer ball of his alma mater, St Edmund Hall, Oxford. He was Bishop of Mashonaland in the Province of Central Africa from 1968 to 1981. On his return to England, he was Rector of Empingham and an honorary assistant bishop in the Diocese of Peterborough, 1981–1985. A Sub-Prelate of the Order of St John of Jerusalem, he died on 27 January 2003.

Anglican Communion titles
Preceded by Cecil William Alderson	Bishop of Mashonaland; 1968–1981	Succeeded by Peter Hatendi as Bishop of Harare and Mashonaland
