= Arthur Chandler (bishop) =

British Anglican bishop in Southern Africa (1859–1939)

The Right Reverend Arthur Chandler
- Bishop of Bloemfontein
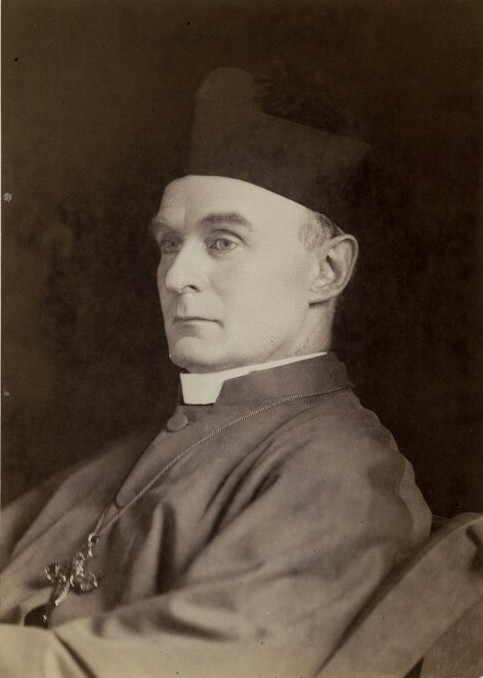
- Church: Church of the Province of Southern Africa
- Diocese: Bloemfontein
- In office: 1902–1920
- Predecessor: Wale Hicks
- Successor: Walter Carey

Orders
- Ordination: 1883

Personal details
- Born: 25 March 1859
- Died: 5 November 1939 (aged 80) Petersfield, England
- Denomination: Anglicanism
- Education: University College, Oxford

Arthur Chandler (25 March 1859 – 5 November 1939) was Bishop of Bloemfontein from 1902 until 1920.

Born at Witley Manor, Surrey, on 25 March 1859, he was the son of the Rev. John Chandler, vicar of Witley. He was educated at Marlborough and University College, Oxford, and ordained in 1883. He began his career as Chaplain to Brasenose College, Oxford, where he was also tutor and elected a Fellow. Later, he was chaplain to the Bishop of Salisbury. He was Rector of All Saints Church, Poplar, London, from 1891 until late 1901 when he was appointed to the episcopate. He was enthroned in the Cathedral, Cape Town on 2 February 1902, and arrived at his see shortly thereafter.

In November 1901 he received the honorary degree Doctor of Divinity from the University of Oxford.

In 1931 he proposed changing the order of the Holy Communion service so that the prayer of oblation followed immediately after the consecration and was then followed by the Lord's Prayer (corresponding to the order in the Book of Common Prayer (1549)). The proposal aroused some support and some opposition and was adopted in some churches though it never received episcopal approval; its provisional nature was the reason for terming it the "Interim" rite. In 1934 he was President of the Church Union. St George's, Hanover Square, London, was one of the churches using the Interim rite.

Chandler retired to Petersfield, Hampshire, where he lived at 3 Weston Road with his sister, and where he died on 5 November 1939, aged 80. He was unmarried.

== Publications ==
- Arthur Chandler, The Spirit of Man. London: Longmans, Green, and Co., 1891.

Anglican Church of Southern Africa titles
Preceded by Wale Hicks	Bishop of Bloemfontein; 1902–1920	Succeeded by Walter Carey
