= Infrastructure Development Bank of Zimbabwe =

- Company type: Parastatal
- Industry: Finance
- Founded: August 31, 2005; 20 years ago
- Headquarters: IDBZ House, 99 Rotten Row, Harare, Zimbabwe
- Key people: Willard Lowenstern Manungo; Chairman; Thomas Zondo Sakala; Chief Executive Officer
- Products: Loans, Equity partnerships, Infrastructure development
- Revenue: ▲Aftertax:US$613 505 (2017)
- Total assets: US$188,983,280 (2017)
- Owner: Government of Zimbabwe
- Number of employees: 82 (2017)
- Website: www.idbz.co.zw

The Infrastructure Development Bank of Zimbabwe (IDBZ) is a government-owned development bank in Zimbabwe, mandated to fund long and medium term funding for key infrastructure projects, including in the areas of transportation, housing, energy, ICT, water and sanitation.

== Location ==
The headquarters of the bank are located at IDBZ House, 99 Gamal Abdel Nasser Road, in Harare, the capital city of Zimbabwe. The geographical coordinates of the bank's headquarters are: 17°49'59.0"S, 31°02'23.0"E (Latitude:-17.833056; Longitude:31.039722).

The bank maintains a branch office at 263 Leopold Takawira Avenue, Khumalo, in the city of Bulawayo, Zimbabwe's second largest city, approximately 438 kilometres (272 mi), south-west of Harare.

== Overview ==
The IDBZ was established 31 August 2005, taking over the assets and liabilities of the former Zimbabwe Development Bank (“ZDB”). It was founded, primarily as a vehicle for the promotion of economic development, economic growth and improvement of the living standards of Zimbabweans, through the development of infrastructure. Infrastructure includes energy, housing, transport, information communication technology (ICT), water and sanitation, among other projects. The bank serves as an infrastructure development finance institution.

As of 31 December 2017, the bank's total assets were valued at US$188,983,280 with US$54,780,479 in shareholders' equity. In late August 2018, the Government of Zimbabwe increased the shareholding and capitalization of the bank by US$150 million, increasing the bank's total assets to over US$330 million and shareholding to over US$200 million.

== Board of directors ==
As of September 2018, IDBZ's board of directors consisted of:

- Willard Lowenstern Manungo: Chairman
- Thomas Zondo Sakala: Chief Executive Officer
- Vavarirai Humwe Choga
- Nelson Kudenga
- Joseph Mhakayakora
- Shadreck Sariri Mlambo
- Margaret Mazvita Mukahanana-Sangarwe
- Charles Simbarashe Tawha

== Management ==
As of September 2018, IDBZ's management team was:

- Thomas Zondo Sakala: Chief Executive Officer
- Desmond Matete: Director Infrastructure Projects
- Cassius Gambinga: Director of Finance
- Phillip Tadiwa: Director Corporate Services and Human Resources.

== See also ==
- Economy of Zimbabwe
- List of banks in Zimbabwe
- Trade and Development Bank
- Southern African Development Community
- World Bank
