= Cathedral of St Mary and All Saints, Harare =

Anglican cathedral in Zimbabwe

Coordinates: 17.8280°S 31.0512°E

Cathedral of St Mary and All Saints
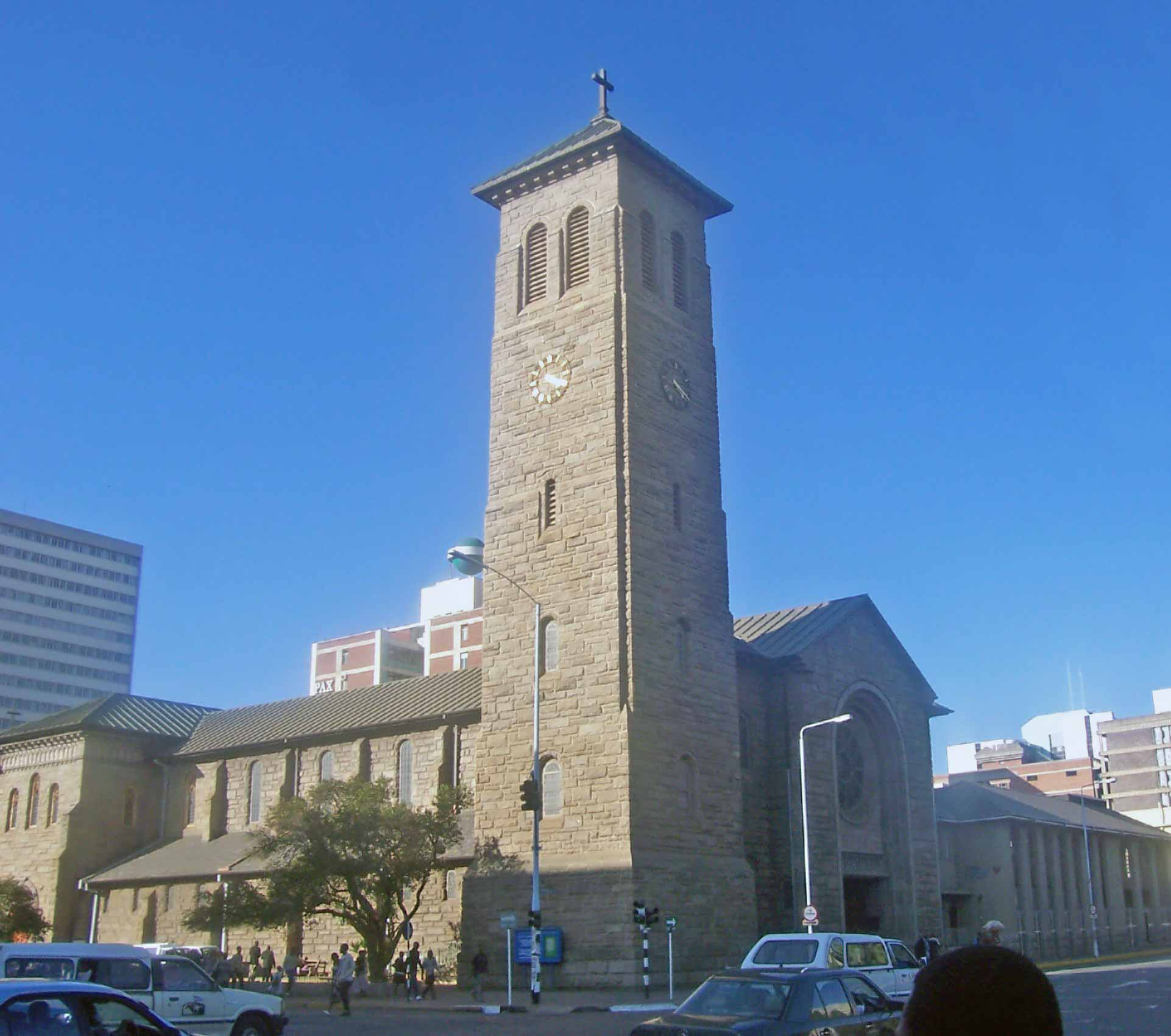
- Cathedral of St Mary and All Saints

Religion
- Affiliation: Anglican Communion
- District: Harare, Zimbabwe
- Ecclesiastical or organizational status: Major cathedral

Location
- Location: Harare Zimbabwe
- Interactive map of Cathedral of St Mary and All Saints

Architecture
- Architect: Herbert Baker
- Groundbreaking: 1913
- Completed: 1961

The Cathedral of St Mary and All Saints, Harare is an Anglican cathedral in Zimbabwe. The cathedral, located at the intersection of Nelson Mandela Avenue and Sam Nujoma Street in Harare, was begun in 1913 to plans by British architect Herbert Baker; he also designed the cathedrals of Cape Town and Johannesburg.

== History ==
Construction began under Frederic Beaven, Bishop of Mashonaland, and the sanctuary and choir were completed in 1914. The sandstone structure was only finished in 1961. The cathedral features a bell tower with 10 bells which were cast in London. There are four chapels, dedicated to St George, St Mary, St Cecelia and the martyr Bernard Mizeki. The cathedral stood uncompleted for very many years with corrugated iron sheeting covering the uncompleted section. When the time came to finish the construction it was found that the quarry from where the original stone blocks came from was almost entirely worked out. However, moulds were made of the original stones at the Cathedral, and stone dust from the original quarry was mixed with concrete to form new blocks with the same texture and appearance as the original ones. This enabled the Cathedral to be finally completed.

On the walls of the nave, there are 14 murals of Jesus Christ on the day of his crucifixion, the series being a traditional set of the stations of the Cross. The murals were painted in spring 1981, and presented for Easter celebration that year.

In 2012, a special service marked the return of the building to the Church of the Province of Central Africa after victory in a long-running legal battle with excommunicated former bishop Nolbert Kunonga, who had broken away from the CPCA in 2007 to form his own church. Kunonga and his supporters seized cars, churches, orphanages and other properties belonging to the CPCA. Eventually, the Supreme Court ruled that all the properties should be returned to the Anglican Diocese of Harare.

The present Bishop of Harare is Farai Mutamiri.

== See also ==
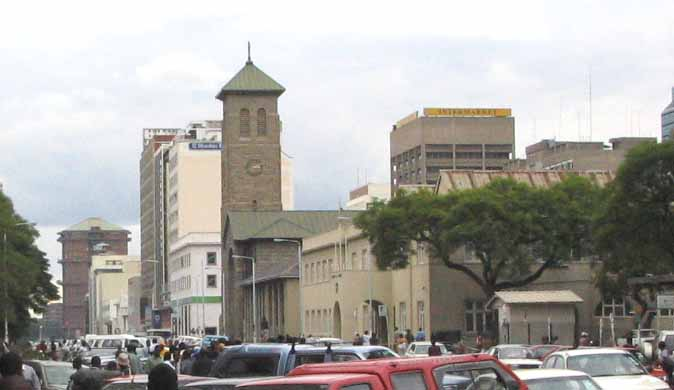
Street scene

Bishopslea Preparatory School
