= Chirikure Chirikure =

Zimbabwean poet, songwriter, and writer

Chirikure Chirikure (born 1962), is a Zimbabwean poet, songwriter, and writer. He is a graduate of the University of Zimbabwe and an Honorary Fellow of University of Iowa, US. He worked with one of Zimbabwe's leading publishing houses as an editor/publisher for 17 years, until 2002. He now runs a literary agency and also works as a performance poet, cultural consultant and translator.

== Literary career ==
He has contributed some pieces in a Shona poetry anthology, Zviri Muchinokoro (2005, ZPH Publishers).

He has written and translated a number of children's stories and published some educational textbooks, and has also been an occasional contributor to the print media and ran a radio programme for young Shona writers. Chirikure performs his poetry solo and/or with his mbira music ensemble. He has recorded an album of poetry and music, Napukeni (2002), with his colleagues, DeteMbira Group. He has also written lyrics for a number of leading Zimbabwean musicians and he occasionally performs with some of these musicians.

== Prizes ==
All of Chirikure's poetry books received first prizes in the annual Zimbabwe writer of the year awards. His first volume, Rukuvhute, also received an Honorable Mention in the Noma Award for Publishing in Africa, in 1990.

His other book, Hakurarwi – We Shall not Sleep, was selected as one of the 75 Best Zimbabwean Books of the 20th Century in a competition run by the Zimbabwe International Book Fair in 2004. In that competition the same book got a prize as one of the best five Shona publications of the 20th century. Chirikure has participated in several local and international festivals and symposia over the years. He is married and has three children.

== Bibliography ==
- Rukuvhute (poetry in Shona) (1989), Harare: College Press
- Chamupupuri (poetry in Shona) (1994), Harare: College Press
- Hakurarwi – We Shall not Sleep (poetry in Shona, with English translations) (1994), Baobab Books
- Mavende aKiti (children's stories) (1989), Harare: College Press
- Zimbabwe Junior Certificate Shona Revision (1989), Harare: College Press
- Grade Seven Shona Revision (co-author), (1989), Harare: College Press
- Zviri Muchinokoro (co-author; poetry anthology), (2004), Harare: ZPH Publishers
- Aussicht auf eigene Schatten (poetry in Shona and English, with German translations) (2011), Heidelberg, Germany: Verlag Das Wunderhorn

== Discography/audio recordings ==
- Napukeni (album of mbira music and poetry) (2002), Tuku Music/ZMC, Harare
- Ray of Hope (Compilation album of AIDS awareness music), Rooftop Promotions, Harare
- Chisina Basa (album recorded in 2012), Rooftop Promotions, Harare
