= Sebastian Bakare =

21st-century Zimbabwean Anglican bishop

- Bishop of Harare and Manicaland
- Installed: January 2008
- Term ended: 2009
- Predecessor: Nolbert Kunonga
- Successor: Chad N. Gandiya

Personal details
- Born: 1940 (age 85–86) Southern Rhodesia

Sebastian Bakare (born 1940) is a Zimbabwean retired Anglican Bishop of the Diocese of Harare and former Bishop of Manicaland. He was once engaged in a controversial, drawn-out, and divisive power struggle over the leadership of the Diocese of Harare with Nolbert Kunonga, the former Bishop of Harare, since Kunonga was stripped of his episcopacy in January 2008 by the Province.

== Life ==
Bakare was formerly Bishop of Manicaland until his retirement. He continued to reside in Mutare, the see city of his diocese, until he was asked by the Dean of the Church of the Province of Central Africa on 7 November 2007 to take over the Diocese of Harare after the ouster of Bishop Nolbert Kunonga, who had aligned himself with the Marxist régime of Robert Mugabe in an attempt to withdraw his diocese from the Province of Central Africa. It was expected Bakare would be a caretaker bishop until a substantive leader could be elected.

Bakare denounced Mugabe's treatment of Christians, particularly Anglicans who refuse to recognize the authority of Kunonga. Many Anglican churches have been closed on the orders of Mugabe's party, Zanu-PF, which believes it should continue to rule Zimbabwe despite an electoral defeat in March 2008.

At the decennial Lambeth Conference in Canterbury, England, Bakare spoke of Zimbabwe to newsmen: "The ruling system is so oppressive that it has denied the people their human rights, including religious freedom. My diocese continues to suffer persecution. We have been denied the freedom to worship."

On 30 October 2008, it was announced that Bakare had been awarded Sweden's 2008 Per Anger Prize for his "committed work for human rights in a politically unstable Zimbabwe." He received the award in Stockholm on 10 November 2008. "It is like a war, in the sense that there is total absence of peace," Bakare told Swedish radio news in describing conditions in his homeland.
