= John Chandler (clergyman) =

English clergyman, hymn collector and translator (1818–1866)

John Chandler (16 June 1806 – 1 July 1876) was an English clergyman and translator of Latin hymns, and the compiler of The Hymns of the Primitive Church.

He was born at Witley Manor near Godalming in Surrey, where his father (John Flutter Chandler, died 1837) was the vicar of Witley. Educated at Corpus Christi College, Oxford, he obtained his BA in 1827 and MA in 1830. He became curate of Witley and succeeded his father as vicar in 1839, remaining there until his death. He married Caroline Mary Brownlow in 1841.

== Hymns of the Primitive Church ==
A desire to recover the lost treasures of breviaries and service books of the ancient Greek and Latin churches emerged in the 1830s as part of the Oxford Movement. Chandler, wanting to see the ancient prayers of the Anglican liturgy matched with hymns from a corresponding date, compiled The Hymns of the Primitive Church, which he published in 1837. A later edition, The Hymns of the Church, mostly Primitive, following in 1841. Included were hymns such as 'On Jordan's banks the Baptist's cry', 'As now the sun's declining rays' and 'The heavenly child in stature grows'. Sources for his work included The Parisian Breviary (from its famous 1736 edition), a compilation of Latin hymns by George Cassander (Cologne, 1556), and other old books of hymns, from which he selected and translated the texts of over 100 hymns, organized according to the Christian year.

As a result of his work, and that of younger contemporaries such as John Mason Neale, Thomas Helmore, Edward Caswall, Jane Laurie Borthwick and Catherine Winkworth, Greek, Latin and even German hymns in translation entered the mainstream of English hymnody. Besides the translation of medieval hymns and use of plainsong melodies, the Oxford Reformers, inspired by Reginald Heber's work, also began to write original hymns, which led to the publication of the broader Hymns Ancient and Modern in 1861, including music.

== Later life and family ==
Chandler also published a Life of William of Wykeham in 1842, and Horae sacrae: prayers and meditations from the writings of the divines of the Anglican Church (1854). He died, following a five-year period of mental decline, at Denham Lodge in Putney in July 1876, aged 70.

His son John Brownlow Chandler was vicar of Witley in his turn from 1882 until his death in 1894. Another son, Edward Chandler, was a churchwarden there for many years. And a further son, Arthur Chandler (1859–1939), became the Bishop of Bloemfontein in South Africa from 1902 until 1920.
