= George Knight-Bruce =

English-born Anglican bishop active in Southern Africa (1853 - 1896)

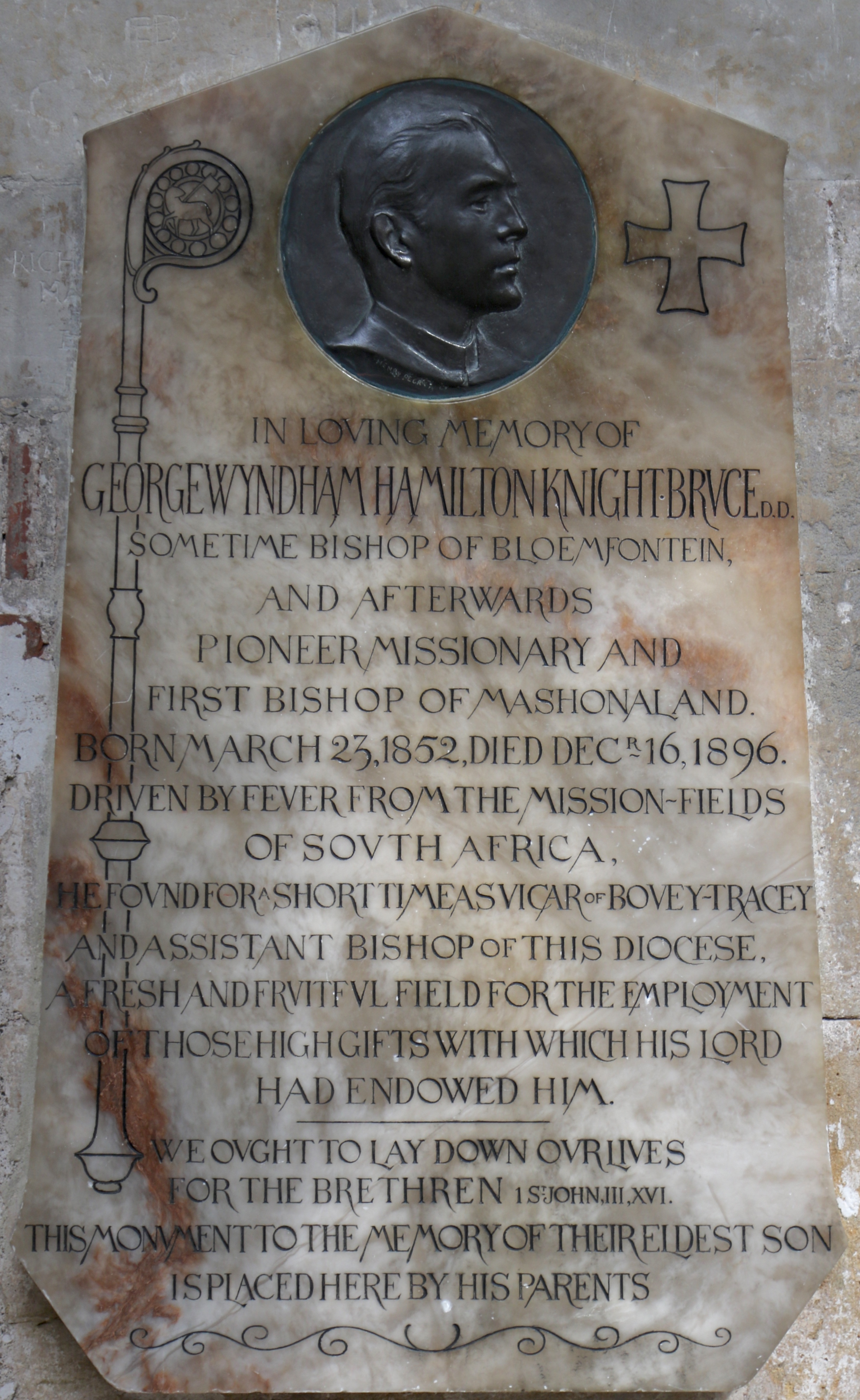
Memorial in Exeter Cathedral

George Wyndham Hamilton Knight-Bruce was an Anglican bishop serving in Southern Africa, first as bishop of Bloemfontein and then as the inaugural bishop of Mashonaland, in the late nineteenth century. Knight-Bruce was born in 1853 and, having retired early owing to ill health, died in 1896.

== Education and early appointments ==
Coats of Arms of George Knight-Bruce

He was born in 1852 in Devonshire, was the eldest son of Lewis Bruce Knight-Bruce of Roehampton Priory, Surrey, and his wife (and cousin), Caroline Margaret Eliza, only daughter of Thomas Newte Mountford Newte of Tiverton in Devonshire. Sir James Lewis Knight-Bruce was his grandfather.

He was educated at Eton and Merton College, Oxford, and ordained in 1887. He began his career with curacies at Bibury and Wendron. He then held incumbencies at St George's Church, Everton and Bethnal Green. During this period the Oxford House Settlement was established.

== Southern Africa ==
On 25 March 1886, he elevated to the episcopate, Knight-Bruce went to South Africa as bishop of Bloemfontein in 1886. Translated to Mashonaland as its first bishop in 1891, he resigned in 1895.

Knight-Bruce was accompanied by the lay catechist and, ultimately, martyr, Bernard Mizeki, (c 1861-1896) who under Knight-Bruce and his successor Bishop Gaul would carry out missionary work amongst the Shona people.

Knight-Bruce left an account of this missionary endeavour in his published Journals of the Mashonaland Mission 1888 to 1892, and in subsequent reminiscences under the title Memories of Mashonaland.

The Bishop retired early due to ill health.

== Return to England ==
On his return to England he was appointed rector of Bovey Tracey and an assistant bishop within the Diocese of Exeter, posts he held until his death on 16 December 1896.

== Family ==
On 21 August 1878, he married Louisa, daughter of John Torr of Carlett Park in Cheshire. By her he had a daughter.

Anglican Church of Southern Africa titles
Preceded by Alan Becher Webb	Bishop of Bloemfontein; 1886–1891	Succeeded by John Wale Hicks
Anglican Communion titles
Preceded by Inaugural appointment	Bishop of Mashonaland; 1891–1895	Succeeded by William Thomas Gaul
