= Chad Gandiya =

Zimbabwean Anglican bishop

Chad Gandiya was an Anglican bishop in Zimbabwe.

Gandiya was educated at St John's College, Nottingham and the University of Zimbabwe. He undertook further post-graduate training in medical ethics in the US and in Zimbabwe. He served as a parish priest and lecturer. He was Principal of Bishop Gaul College then Bishop of Harare from 2009 until his retirement in 2018. He returned to Bishop Gaula as acting principal in 2019.
