= Wale Hicks =

John Wale Hicks FRCP was an Anglican bishop, educationalist and author in the second half of the nineteenth century. He was identified with the Anglo-Catholic tradition of Anglicanism.

== Life ==
He was born in 1840 and studied at the University of London and at St Thomas's Hospital before entering Sidney Sussex College, Cambridge in 1866. Ordained in 1871, his first post was a curacy at Little St Mary's, Cambridge. A multi-disciplinary scientist, he was elected a fellow of Sidney Sussex College in 1874, where he published "books on both doctrine and inorganic chemistry". He was later elected Dean of Sidney Sussex and in 1892 chosen to succeed George Wyndham Knight-Bruce as Bishop of Bloemfontein, a post he held until his death on 12 October 1899. There is a memorial window to him in Clawton parish church.

== Works ==
- A Text-Book of Inorganic Chemistry, 1877
- The Christian Doctrine of the Godhead, 1886
- The Doctrine of Absolution, 1889
- The Fall and Restoration of Man, 1893

Anglican Church of Southern Africa titles
Preceded by George Knight-Bruce	Bishop of Bloemfontein; 1892–1899	Succeeded by Arthur Chandler
