= Listed buildings in Newborough, Staffordshire =

Newborough is a civil parish in the district of East Staffordshire, Staffordshire, England. The parish contains ten listed buildings that are recorded in the National Heritage List for England. All the listed buildings are designated at Grade II, the lowest of the three grades, which is applied to "buildings of national importance and special interest". The parish contains the village of Newborough and the surrounding countryside. The listed buildings include farmhouses and farm buildings, a small country house and associated structures, a thatched cottage, a church, and three mileposts.

== Buildings ==
Name and location	Photograph	Date	Notes
Farm building, Newborough Hall Farm; 52.82988°N 1.80223°W	—	17th century	The farm building has been altered and extended. The original parts are timber framed with brick infill, rebuilding and extensions in red brick, and a roof of Staffordshire blue tiles. There is a single storey with lofts, five bays, and an attached low lean-to with a hipped roof. The building contains a doorway with a segmental arch, a casement window and a fixed window.
The Old Thatch; 52.82315°N 1.80366°W	—	17th century	A timber framed cottage with a thatched roof. There is one storey and an attic, two bays, and a later low extension to the left. The central doorway has a rustic porch, the windows are casements, and the roof sweeps over two dormers. Inside is a timber-framed partition.
Elland Lodge Farmhouse; 52.84025°N 1.78350°W	—	18th century	A red brick farmhouse with a floor band, dentilled eaves and a tile roof. There are two storeys and four bays. The windows are casements, most with segmental heads.
Moat Hall Farmhouse; 52.81882°N 1.79991°W	—	18th century	The farmhouse stands on a moated site. It is in red brick with a floor band, a dentilled eaves course, and a tile roof. There is a T-shaped plan, three storeys, and three bays. On the front is a gabled porch, and the windows are sashes, those in the lower two floors with segmental heads.
Holly Bush; 52.83456°N 1.79804°W	—	Early 19th century	A small country house, plastered, with an eaves cornice, a parapet, and a hipped slate roof. There are two storeys and three bays, and a recessed two-storey two-bay service wing, with a one-storey three-bay extension. On the front is a hexastyle portico with Ionic columns, a balustraded balcony, and a doorway with pilasters and a semicircular fanlight that is flanked by semicircular windows. The other windows are sashes, the window above the portico with a moulded architrave.
Coach house and stables west of Holly Bush; 52.83460°N 1.79895°W	—	Early 19th century	The coach house and stables are in painted brick with a hipped slate roof and one storey. There is a main range, an east wing, and ranges to the south. The main range has five bays, the middle bay projecting with a pediment containing an oculus, over which is a cupola. It contains a carriage arch with rusticated voussoirs and a keystone. In the east wing are blind semicircular arches.
Stables and house west of Holly Bush; 52.83443°N 1.79904°W	—	Early 19th century	The stables have been partly converted into a house. The stable has a single storey to the left, and the house has two storeys, all under the same hipped slate roof. There are seven bays. The middle bay projects, it contains a semicircular arch above which is a pediment and a cupola. The stables have blind semicircular arches with inserted windows, and the house has casement windows.
Milepost at NGR SK 12802544; 52.82641°N 1.81166°W		Mid to late 19th century	The milepost is on the north side of the B5234 road. It is in cast iron with a triangular plan and a cambered top. On the top is inscribed "NEWBOROUGH" and on the sides are the distances to Abbots Bromley, Newborough, and Burton upon Trent.
Milepost at NGR SK 14312517; 52.82405°N 1.78930°W		Mid to late 19th century	The milepost is on the southwest side of the B5234 road. It is in cast iron with a triangular plan and a cambered top. On the top is inscribed "NEWBOROUGH" and on the sides are the distances to Abbots Bromley, Newborough, and Burton upon Trent.
All Saints Church; 52.82596°N 1.80063°W		1899–1901	The church was designed by John Oldrid Scott in Gothic style. It is built in stone with a tile roof, and consists of a nave, a north porch, a chancel, a southeast vestry, a northeast organ chamber, and a southeast tower. The tower has five stages, the lower two stages are square, the upper stages are octagonal, there is a semi-octagonal projection to the south, and it has a recessed crocketed spire.
