= Nolbert Kunonga =

Zimbabwean Anglican bishop (born 1950)

- Former Anglican Bishop (Excommunicated) of Harare and Mashonaland
- Installed: October 24, 1997
- Term ended: January 2008
- Predecessor: Peter Hatendi
- Successor: Sebastian Bakare

Personal details
- Born: 31 December 1950 (age 75) Wedza District, Southern Rhodesia (now Zimbabwe)

Nolbert Kunonga (born 31 December 1950 in Wedza District, Southern Rhodesia) is the former Zimbabwean Anglican Bishop of Harare and Mashonaland.

== Controversy ==
Kunonga was criticised within and outside the Anglican Communion for his ardent support of Robert Mugabe, the President of Zimbabwe. This was at a time when other religious leaders in the country, notably the Roman Catholic archbishop, Pius Ncube, were condemning Mugabe's government for its human rights excesses across Zimbabwe.

Kunonga was in and out of ecclesiastical courts between 2005 and 2017. In 2008, he was officially excommunicated, stripping him of all recognition as a cleric within the global Anglican Communion. A judge ordered in January 2008 that the breakaway Anglican province led by Kunonga must share the use of church buildings with the Anglican Church of the Province of Central Africa loyal to Bishop Sebastian Bakare.

In August 2011, the country's Chief Justice ruled that all Anglican property in the Harare diocese was under Kunonga's custody. However, on 19 November 2012, the Zimbabwe Supreme Court Deputy Chief Justice, Luke Malaba, ruled that Kunonga and his followers were no longer part of the Church of the Province of Central Africa and that Kunonga would have to surrender everything that belonged to the church that had been taken under his control. He was also ordered to pay the costs of the civil appeal.

On 17 March 2017, Kunonga was ordered to pay $427,000 for shares Kunonga sold, when the Zimbabwean Supreme Court upheld a ruling that the shares belonged to Church of the Province of Central Africa.
