= Jonathan Siyachitema =

Zimbabwean Anglican bishop (1932–2022)

Jonathan Siyachitema (1932 – 6 May 2022) was an Anglican bishop in Zimbabwe.

Siyachitema was born in 1932 and educated at Sarum College. He was ordained in 1971 and began his career in Bulawayo. Later he was the Archdeacon of Matabeleland from 1974 to 1978; Dean of Bulawayo from 1978 to 1981; Suffragan Bishop of the Lundi from 1981 to 1995; and Bishop of Harare from 1995 to 1997.

Siyachitema died on 6 May 2022, at the age of 89–90.
