= Frederic Beaven =

Frederic Hicks Beaven (11 April 1855 – 22 January 1941) was bishop of Mashonaland from 1911, through 1915 when his title was changed to bishop of Southern Rhodesia, until his retirement in 1925.

== Life ==
Born in Rodwell, near Calne in Wiltshire, he was the eldest son of Christopher, a farmer, and Edith (née Hicks) Beaven who lived at Broughton Gifford, Wiltshire. Frederic had three brothers, all of whom emigrated to Australia, and two sisters. He married Georgina Braithwaite Dawes in 1883 in Brighton; they did not have any children.

He was educated at Queen Elizabeth's School, Wimborne Minster and University College, Durham. He was ordained in 1879 after studying at St Bees Theological College. His first post was a curacy at St Martin's Church, Brighton. He then held incumbencies at All Saints', Newborough, Staffordshire (1881–85), St Chad's Church, Stafford (1885–87) and St Paul's, Burton upon Trent (1887–1901).

In the Second Boer War, he was an acting chaplain to the 2nd Battalion, the North Staffordshire Regiment, and from 1903 he was archdeacon of Matabeleland. In 1908 he became the dean of Salisbury (now Harare), his last appointment before elevation to the episcopate in 1911. He was consecrated Bishop in Cape Town Cathedral on New Year's Day, 1911. He was responsible for the start of construction of the Cathedral of St Mary and All Saints in Salisbury, where the choir and sanctuary were completed in 1914. In the First World War, he was chaplain general of the Rhodesian Forces. During his episcopate, in 1919, the first indigenous person in Zimbabwe, Samuel Mhlanga, was ordained to the deaconate. Beaven became a Doctor of Divinity (DD).

Retiring from his bishopric, he served as rector of Thelnetham, Suffolk, 1925–26. Subsequently he lived in Paignton, Worthing and Bognor Regis.

The National Portrait Gallery has two portrait photographs of Beaven.
