= Bernard Mizeki =

African Christian missionary and martyr

Bernard Mizeki (sometimes spelt Bernard Mzeki; c. 1861 – 18 June 1896) was an African Christian missionary and martyr. Born in Mozambique, he moved to Cape Town, attended an Anglican school, and became a Christian.

== Early life ==
He was born Mamiyeri Mitseka Gwambe in Inhambane, Portuguese East Africa (now Mozambique) and raised in a traditional fashion. As a boy, he did some work in a store run by a Portuguese trader, and learned some Portuguese. Between the ages of ten and fifteen, he moved with a cousin to Cape Town, Cape Colony (now South Africa), where he took a new name, "Barns", as well as various jobs as a labourer and house servant. When he was a little older, he left his home and continued to work as a labourer, living in the slums of Cape Town, but (perceiving the disastrous effects of drunkenness on many workers in the slums) firmly refusing to drink alcohol, and remaining largely uncorrupted by his surroundings. After his day's work, he attended night classes at an Anglican school. Under the influence of his teachers, from the Society of St John the Evangelist (SSJE, an Anglican religious order for men, popularly called the Cowley Fathers), he became a Christian and was baptized on 9 March 1886. Besides the fundamentals of European schooling, he mastered English, French, High Dutch, and at least eight local African languages. In time he would be an invaluable assistant when the Anglican church began translating sacred texts into African languages.

== Missionary work ==
Through the work of the Cowley Fathers' mission, and particularly the night school run by German missionary Baroness Paula Dorothea von Blomberg, he became a Christian. He and five others were some of the first converts, baptized in St Philip's Mission, Sir Lowry Road, on 7 March 1886. Shortly thereafter, Bernard (then about 25 years old) started work at St Columba's Hostel, which was run by the missionaries for African men. Within a few months he was sent to Zonnebloem College to train as a catechist. In January 1891, Bernard accompanied the new missionary bishop of Mashonaland, George Wyndham Knight-Bruce, as a lay catechist and medical worker among the Shona people in Southern Rhodesia (now Zimbabwe).

He was sent to work in the Marandellas (Marondera) district among the Nhowe people, and settled in the kraal of Mungati Mangwende. Bernard built his home there, and gained a reputation as a teacher. He took children who wanted to learn into his home to teach them the gospel, and traveled to the bishop's residence in Umtali to help with translations.

In March 1896, Mizeki married Mutwa (later "Lily"), an orphaned granddaughter of the Mangwende and a Christian convert. African Anglican priest Rev. Hezekiah Mtobi, recently arrived from Grahamstown, South Africa led the ceremony. Mizeki was thus admitted into the Mangwende's kinship network, which some resented.

With the Mangwende's permission, Mizeki moved his growing community (several families, as well as young boys he was entrusted to teach), about two miles. They resettled across the river in a fertile area with a spring, but also near a sacred grove which was believed to be inhabited by spirits of the tribe's ancestral lions. Rather than make offerings to such spirits, Mizeki made the sign of the cross in the air, and carved crosses on some of the trees, and later felled some trees while preparing a field to plant wheat.

== Martyrdom ==
The Ndebele people (traditional rivals of the Shona) had rebelled against the British South Africa Company, and in March 1896 the Matabeleland Rebellion spread into the Shona country. Southern Africa had been experiencing drought and locust plagues, which led to famine. Resentment against the British and their taxes and mandatory inoculations simmered, inflamed by orders to kill and burn infected cattle. Although missionary workers were being ordered to safety, Mizeki refused to leave, rationalizing that his absent bishop's orders to stay could not be overruled (although the bishop was in England receiving medical treatment for malaria, and would soon die there), and that he had recently extended hospitality to an incapacitated elderly man.

On the night of 18 June 1896, Mizeki was dragged from his home and stabbed. Mutwa found him still alive and went for help. She and others reported seeing a great white light all over that place, and a loud noise “like many wings of great birds”. Bernard's body had disappeared by their return.

Mchemwa, a son of the Mangwende and an ally of the witch doctors, was later found responsible for Bernard's murder as well as the destruction of the mission settlement there.

== Legacy and veneration ==
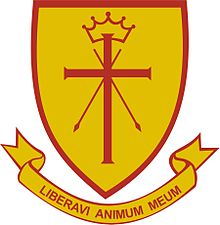
The badge of Bernard Mizeki College

Bernard Mizeki's work among the Shona bore fruit, beyond the posthumous daughter Mutwa bore. After long years of mission work in Mashonaland, the first Shona convert to be baptised was one of the young men whom Mizeki had taught, John Kapuya. John was baptised only a month after Mizeki's death, on 18 July 1896. In 1899, a white Anglican priest returned to the area, and re-established the mission, as well as a school. Today, Bernard Mizeki College stands close to where he lived, and the Mangwende's kraal, above the village, is crowned with a large cross to commemorate Mizeki.

In the 1930s, a chapel was built on the site of Mizeki's martyrdom, and consecrated in a great ceremony in June 1938. On the fiftieth anniversary of his death in 1946, an even larger celebration was held, attended by Mutwa and their daughter, and included a proclamation issued by Rhodesia's governor.

Mizeki is honoured with a feast day on the liturgical calendar of the Episcopal Church (USA) on 18 June. The Anglican Church of Southern Africa commemorates Mizeki in its calendar of commemorations and other special days on 18 June each year. The Anglican Church of Canada has a memorial for Mizeki on this date.

Bernard is remembered in the Church of England with a commemoration on 18 June.

In 1973, a church serving mostly Xhosa migrant workers, was dedicated to Bernard Mizeki in Paarl, South Africa. The Bernard Mizeki Men's Guild was established for Anglican lay men to promote and encourage the participation and nurturing of men's leadership in the life of the Church. Composed largely of Xhosa-speaking migrant workers, Bernard Mizeki Guilds spread across South Africa. Guild members wear purple waistcoats, a special badge. Anglican migrant workers could identify with Bernard Mizeki as a fellow migrant who sacrificed himself for Christ. Members of the guild aspire to make the annual pilgrimage to the Mizeki festival in Zimbabwe.

== Sources ==
- Anon (2019). Lesser Feasts and Fasts 2018. Church Publishing. ISBN 978-1-64065-235-4.
- Farrant, Jean Cecil (1966). Mashonaland Martyr: Bernard Mizeki and the Pioneer Church. Oxford University Press.
- Kiefer, James E. "Bernard Mizeki, Catechist and Martyr in Africa". Biographical sketches of memorable Christians of the past.
- Noll, Mark A.; Nystrom, Carolyn (2011). Clouds of Witnesses: Christian Voices from Africa and Asia. InterVarsity Press. ISBN 978-0-8308-6861-2.
- Ranger, Terence (1987). "Taking Hold of the Land: Holy Places and Pilgrimages in Twentieth-Century Zimbabwe". Past & Present (117): 158–194. doi:10.1093/past/117.1.158. JSTOR 650791.
- Robert, Dana L. (2011). Christian Mission: How Christianity Became a World Religion. John Wiley & Sons. ISBN 978-1-4443-5864-3.
- Snell, Margaret L. (1986). Bernard Mizeki of Zimbabwe. Mambo Press. ISBN 978-0-86922-393-2.
- Zvobgo, Chengetai J. M. (2009). A History of Zimbabwe, 1890-2000 and Postscript, Zimbabwe, 2001-2008. Cambridge Scholars Publishing. ISBN 978-1-4438-1599-4.
- Reynolds, Stephen (2007). For All the Saints: Prayers and Readings for Saints' Days. Toronto: ABC Publishing.
- Robert, Dana L. (2003). Mission churches. Southern African Missiological Society. ISBN 978-1-86888-284-7.
- Saints and Seasons. London: Harper Collins. 1993. ISBN 0 00 599349-0 – via Church of the Province of Southern Africa.
- An Anglican Prayer Book (Standard ed.). HarperCollins Publishers. 1989. ISBN 978-000-5991-80-0.
