= Zonnebloem Nest Senior School =

Coordinates: 33°56′3″S 18°26′18″E

Zonnebloem Nest Senior School is a school in the Western Cape.

== History ==
Zonnebloem College was founded on 11 March 1858 by Sir George Grey, Reverend Tiyo Soga and Bishop Gray on Protea Farm known today as Bishopscourt. The institution was originally established for the children of Xhosa royal families who were Christian. Later on, it would be open to all races. The school opened with 39 pupils-36 boys and 3 girls but as that number grew, Bishop Gray was forced to look for other premises. Zonnebloem which means "the place of sunflowers", the origins of which trace back to the early 1700s, came on to the market.

In 1860 the college moved to the farm and adopted the name of the farm, its emblem and created the motto, Et Fili Lucis Ambulate, which means "walk as the children of the light." When apartheid came into effect a teachers training college, a secondary school, and a boys and girls primary school were constructed. In 1971, the Children's Art Centre moved onto the premises. Notable figures who graduated include Emma Sandile and Harold Cressy.

== 2012 Possible closure ==
In 2012 the Western Cape Education MEC announced that 27 schools would be possibly closed and Zonnebloem Nest was one of those schools. The school petitioned and protested for the school to stay open. The closure was for underperforming schools and Zonnebloem was in that category until it was revealed that in 2010 it had a 73% pass rate and in 2011 had an 85% pass rate. Equal Education saw this as an improper reason to declare Zonnebloem Nest as an underperforming school, as the percentage for an underperforming school is below 60%. Equal Education held a picket outside Western Cape Education Department on Lower Parliament Street in Cape Town. It was announced that Zonnebloem would not be closed as it was not an underperforming school.
