= Thomas Zondo Sakala =

Personal details
- Born: 3 March 1955 (age 71) Marange, Zimbabwe
- Education: University of Ibadan; University of Sussex in the United Kingdom
- Profession: International civil servant

Thomas Zondo Sakala (born 3 March 1955) is an experienced Zimbabwean economist and development banker. He is the former Vice-President of the African Development Bank in charge of Country and Regional Programmes (as of October 2014). He was the SADC nominee for the Presidency of the African Development Bank (AfDB)

== Early life and career ==
Thomas Zondo Sakala holds a BSc (Hons) and an MSc in Economics from the University of Ibadan in Nigeria. He also undertook research work on the anticipated challenges of land and agricultural transformation in post-independent Zimbabwe at the Institute of Development Studies, University of Sussex in the United Kingdom. His early years were spent in rural Zimbabwe where he attended primary and secondary school.

Prior to joining the AfDB, Sakala worked three years as Senior Research and Principal Planning Officer in the newly created Ministry of Manpower Planning and Development in Zimbabwe, which carried out Zimbabwe's first post-independence National Manpower Survey. He was part of the Survey's central coordinating team and was one of the architects of its major policy recommendations, many of which were implemented by the Government.

== Career With the African Development Bank ==
Zondo Sakala has worked in, and with, African countries all through his professional career. He left the African Development Bank in October 2014. His last official position was vice-president, Country and Regional Programmes. In that capacity he was a member of the Senior Management Team of the Bank led by President Kaberuka, contributing to its overall strategic direction and institutional performance.

During his rich career at the Bank, spanning 31 years, he worked in most of the operational and institutional areas of the institution. He visited and worked on many development projects across the continent in agriculture, education and skills development, health, infrastructure (transport and communications, water and sanitation, energy), capacity building and governance. Besides his country of origin, he has lived in Côte d'Ivoire, Tunisia and the UK. He also lived in Nigeria, including four years as the Bank's country representative.

In his last position As Vice-President, he had broad oversight of the dialogue between the Bank and all African countries. His responsibilities included coordination of the preparation and approval of the country and regional strategies and programming in Africa. It also involved developing appropriate operational policies, inter alia, on integrity in procurement and fiduciary arrangements; the Bank's strategy for its work in fragile states; and overseeing the proper implementation of policies, strategies and guidelines on gender, environment, climate change, safeguards and transition to green economies. He had shared responsibility for resource mobilization for the Bank's soft-window (the African Development Fund) and partnerships with donor countries.

Areas of Major Contributions

Key Operational and Budgetary Reforms: during the four years he was in charge of the Programming and Budget Department, the Bank's administrative budget grew by about US$140 million.

Setting up and managing Country and Regional Offices under Decentralisation Programme, thus bringing the Bank closer to its clients.

Resident Representative in Nigeria, the Bank's largest shareholder, a donor through the NTF and Ecowas Headquarters Shared responsibility over the Bank's resource mobilization efforts under the ADF.13 Replenishment

== SADC Candidate as AfDB President ==
The Southern Africa Development Community (SADC) selected T.Z. Sakala as its candidate for African Development Bank Presidency in the elections on 28 May 2015. He lost the presidential race.

== IDBZ ==
He was appointed C.E.O of the Infrastructure Development Bank of Zimbabwe (IDBZ) starting 1 September 2015
