= Anglican Diocese of Harare =

Zimbabwe Anglican church

The Anglican Diocese of Harare is a diocese of the Church of the Province of Central Africa. The Anglican Diocese of Mashonaland was formed in 1891 and its first bishop was George Knight-Bruce. He was succeeded by William Gaul (1895–1907), formerly Rector of St Cyprian's Church in Kimberley, Northern Cape. Small in stature, Gaul styled himself “the smallest bishop with the largest Diocese in Christendom.” In 1915 the diocese became the Diocese of Southern Rhodesia until 1952 when it reverted to the Diocese of Mashonaland. The diocese was known as the Diocese of Harare and Mashonaland, until changing his name to Diocese of Harare. It has experienced great turbulence in recent times.

The bishop's seat is at the Cathedral of St Mary and All Saints, Harare.

== List of bishops ==
- George Knight-Bruce 1891–1895
- William Gaul 1895–1907
- Edmund Powell 1908–1910
- Frederic Beaven 1911–1925
- Edward Paget 1925–1957
- Cecil Alderson 1957–1968
- Paul Burrough 1968–c.1980
  - Patrick Murindagomo was suffragan bishop in 1974
- Peter Hatendi c.1980–c.1995
- Jonathan Siyachitema c.1995–c.2001
- Nolbert Kunonga c.2001–2008
- Sebastian Bakare 2008–2009
- Chad Gandiya 2009–2018
- Farai Mutamiri 2019–
