= William Gaul =

William Thomas Gaul (1850–1927) was an Anglican clergyman in South Africa. He was rector of All Saints Church, Du Toit's Pan, Kimberley, afterwards of St Cyprian's Church, Kimberley, Rural Dean of Griqualand West, and Archdeacon in what was still the Diocese of Bloemfontein, before being elected the second Bishop of Mashonaland, where he styled himself "the smallest bishop with the largest diocese in Christendom." He officiated at the funeral of Cecil John Rhodes and helped draft the Rhodes Trust Deed.

== Early years ==
Gaul was born in 1850 in Derry, Ulster, Ireland. He was educated at Trinity College, Dublin.

He worked as a teacher in Battersea.

== Bloemfontein ==
Going to South Africa in 1874, Gaul went to the Diocese of Bloemfontein where he served inter alia on the staff of the short-lived St Cyprian's Theological College in Bloemfontein, was involved at the Good Shepherd "half-caste" school, Bloemfontein, and presided at St Patrick's, Thaba N'chu. On 22 January 1878 William Thomas Gaul and Mary Ann Glover were married at Bloemfontein Cathedral.

== Kimberley ==
In 1880 he was appointed to the Parish of All Saints, Dutoitspan (Beaconsfield), on the Diamond Fields. In August 1884 the Vicar General of the Diocese of Bloemfontein, Archdeacon D. G. Croghan, appointed Canon W. T. Gaul as Rector of St Cyprian's Kimberley (taking his place at All Saints, as Rector of Beaconsfield, was the Revd Fr C.F. Tobias LLB). In Gaul's appointment, Croghan noted, St Cyprian's assumed first place amongst the Anglican parishes in Kimberley.

Of Canon Gaul, Alpheus Williams says he was "small, gallant, imaginative, humorous, sporting and adventurous. When he came to Kimberley in 1880 he soon became a force in the land – a vivid, straight-forward, amusing personality, beloved by rich and poor." Many congregated to listen to his "clear ringing voice, preaching help for everyday life. His voice was a carrying one, crisp and concise…he was a real shepherd of his flock and rounded them up systematically. He was friendly with all sects, Jew and Gentile." Williams added that "he was solicitous for the betterment of the coloured people" – being the founder of the Perseverance School, "one of the most important institutions of its kind in the country".

== Mashonaland ==
In 1895 Archdeacon Gaul was elected to succeed the Rt Revd G.W.H. Knight-Bruce as Bishop of Mashonaland. He was consecrated Bishop at Bloemfontein Cathedral on the Feast of St Mark (25 April) 1895. At the time, it was rare for an Irish person to become a bishop in the Church of England. According to Pamela Welch, it is probable that Cecil Rhodes influenced the appointment of Gaul; they were friends.

Gaul retired from Mashonaland in 1907 and went to live in England; but he returned to South Africa in 1912, settling in Cape Town, where he died on Ascension Day 1927.

== Legacy ==
Bishop Gaul College, the theological college of the Anglican Church of the Province of Central Africa, and Bishop Gaul Road in Harare are named after William Gaul.

The Bishop's name is inscribed on the Foundation Stone of St Cyprian's Cathedral, Kimberley, which he laid on 5 March 1907, while the carved pulpit in the cathedral, created by Edgar Rose and his wife, was commissioned in his memory in 1933.
