= EBG =

EBG may refer to:

- Ebughu language
- Ecobank Ghana, a commercial bank
- Efficient Basing-Grafenwöhr, a United States Army installation in Germany
- El Bagre Airport, Colombia
- Electromagnetic bandgap metamaterial
- ʻEneʻio Botanical Garden, Tonga
- Engin Blindé du Génie, a French armoured engineering vehicle
- Eoghan Bán Gallagher, a Gaelic footballer
- Equity Bank Group, an African financial holding company
- Erzbischöfliches Gymnasium Beuel, now Kardinal-Frings-Gymnasium, a school in Germany
- Estrella Brisa Gómez, StarAcle
