= BRVM Composite =

The BRVM Composite is a stock index calculated from the value of each stock on the Bourse Régionale des Valeurs Mobilières, or BRVM. The BRVM is organized into 7 sectors.

The Bourse Régionale des Valeurs Mobilières is a regional stock exchange that serves 8 West Africa countries:

- Benin
- Burkina Faso
- (Guinea-Bissau) Guinea Bissau
- Ivory Coast
- Mali
- Niger
- Senegal
- Togo.

The exchange itself is located in Abidjan.

== BRVM stock listings ==
as of March 2009

| Symbol | Stock | Company |
|---|---|---|
| Agriculture Sector | | |
| PALC | PALM CI | PALM - Côte d'Ivoire - edible oil |
| PHC | PH CI | Plantation et Huileries de Côte d'Ivoire - edible oil |
| SICC | SICOR CI | Société Ivoirienne de Coco Râpé coconut, coconut products |
| SOGC | SOGB CI | Société des Caoutchoucs de Grand-Béréby - forestry, logging |
| SPHC | SAPH CI | Société Africaine de Plantation d'Hévéas - agriculture |
| Other Sector | | |
| STAC | SETAO CI | Société d'Etudes et de Travaux pour l'Afrique de l'Ouest - architecture, engineering, construction |
| Distribution Sector | | |
| ABJC | ABIDJAN CATERING CI | ABIDJAN CATERING - Côte d'Ivoire hotel and catering industry |
| BNBC | BERNABE-CI | BERNABE-Côte d'Ivoire - hardware, household goods, ironmongery, metallurgy |
| CFAC | CFAO CI | Compagnie Française de l'Afrique Occidentale en Côte d'Ivoire - wholesale, retail |
| PRSC | PEYRISSAC-CI | PEYRISSAC-Côte d'Ivoire - ironmongery, automotive/electronic import / export |
| SHEC | SHELL CI | SHELL-Côte d'Ivoire (Shell Oil) |
| SRIC | SARI CI | Société Africaine de Représentations Industrielles - motor vehicles, automotive parts |
| TFEC | TOTAL FINA ELF CI | TOTAL FINA ELF OIL Côte d'Ivoire (Total S.A.) |
| Financial Sector | | |
| BICC | BICICI | Banque Internationale pour le Commerce et l'Industrie de la Côte d'Ivoire |
| BOAB | BOA BENIN | Banque of Africa - Bénin (Bank of Africa) |
| BOABF | BOA BURKINA FASO | Banque of Africa - Burkina Faso (Bank of Africa) |
| BOAN | BOA NIGER | Banque of Africa - NIGER (Bank of Africa) |
| ETI | ECOBANK | Ecobank Transnational Inc. (Ecobank) |
| SAFC | SAFCA CI | Société Africaine de Crédit Automobile - vehicle and equipment finance |
| SGBC | SGB CI | Société Générale de Banques en Côte d'Ivoire |
| Industrial Sector | | |
| CABC | SICABLE | Société Ivoirienne de Câbles - wire and cable |
| CDAC | CEDA | Centre d'Edition et de Diffusion Africaines - media |
| FTSC | FILTISAC | Filature, Tissage, Sacs - packaging material |
| NEIC | NEI | Nouvelles Editions Ivoiriennes SA - Edition, Distribution et vente de livres et publication |
| NTLC | NESTLE-CI | NESTLE-Côte d'Ivoire (Nestle's) |
| SACC | SAEC ASTRAL | Société Abidjanaise d'Expansion Chimique - chemicals, paints |
| SEMC | SIEM CI | Société Ivoirienne d'Emballage Métallique - metal cans |
| SGCC | SAGECO CI | Société Abidjanaise de Gérance et d'Exploitation Commerciale food manufacture |
| SIVC | SIVOA CI | Société Ivoirienne d'Oxygène et d'Acétylène - industrial gases |
| SLBC | SOLIBRA CI | Société de Limonaderies et Brasseries d'Afrique - breweries, beverages |
| SMBC | SMB CI | Société Multinationale de Bitumes - petrochemicals |
| STBC | SITAB CI | Société Ivoirienne des Tabacs - tobacco products |
| TTRC | TRITURAF CI | Société ivoirienne de trituration de graines oléagineuses et de raffinage d'huiles végétales - edible oils |
| UNLC | UNILEVER CI | UNILEVER CI (Unilever) |
| UNXC | UNIWAX CI | UNIWAX CI - textiles and clothing |
| Public Utility Sector | | |
| CIEC | CIE CI | Compagnie Ivoirienne d'Electricitév - electricity |
| ONTBF | ONATEL BF | Office National des Télécommunication - Onatel - telecommunications |
| SDCC | SODE CI | Société de Distribution d'Eau de Côte d'Ivoire - water |
| SNTS | SONATEL SN | Société Nationale de Télécommunication - Sonatel - telecommunications |
| Transportation Sector | | |
| SAGC | SAGA CI | SAGA-Côte d'Ivoire - shipping, logistics, tourism |
| SDVC | SDV CI | Société Delmas Vieljeux - freight transport, trucking, logistics |
| SVOC | SIVOM CI | Société Ivoirienne d'Opération Maritimes - shipping |

== See also ==
- List of African stock exchanges
