= Ecobank Nigeria =

Commercial Bank in Nigeria

Ecobank Plc
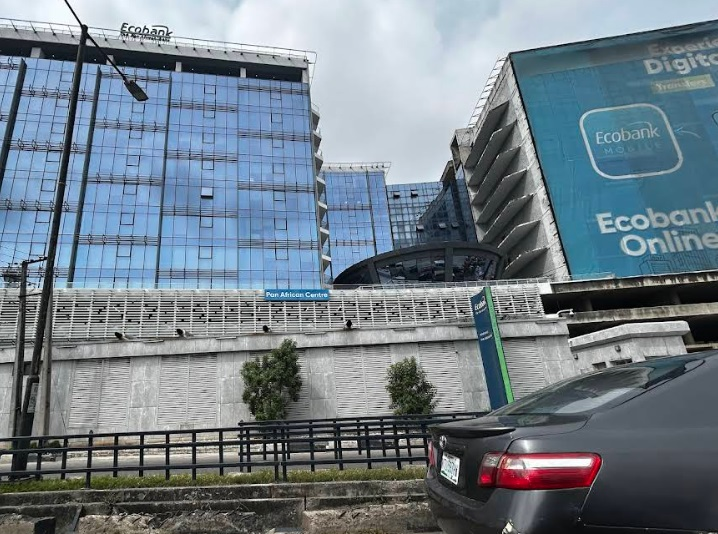
- Type: Public Company; NSE: EBN
- Industry: Financial services
- Founded: 1989
- Headquarters: Lagos, Lagos State, Nigeria
- Key people: Bola Adesola; Chairman (Nigerian); Bolaji Lawal; Managing Director (Nigerian)
- Products: Loans, savings, investments, debit and credit cards, mortgages
- Total assets: US$8.1 billion / N 1.32 trillion (2011)
- Website: ecobank.com/ng/

ECOBANK NIGERIA LIMITED, commonly referred to as Ecobank Nigeria, is a commercial bank in Nigeria. It is one of the commercial banks licensed by the Central Bank of Nigeria, the national banking regulator.

== Overview ==
The bank began operations in 1989. It operates as a universal bank, providing wholesale, retail, corporate, investment and transaction banking services to its customers in the Nigerian market. The bank divides its operations into three major divisions: (a) Retail Banking, (b) Wholesale Banking and (c) Treasury & Financial Institutions. The bank also offers capital markets and investment banking services. During the fourth quarter of 2011, Ecobank Nigeria through its parent company Ecobank Transnational Inc. (ETI) acquired 100% of the shareholding in Oceanic Bank, creating the expanded Ecobank Nigeria Limited. As of December 2011, the expanded Ecobank Nigeria controlled total assets valued at approximately US$8.1 billion (NGN:1.32 trillion), making it one of the five largest banks in Nigeria at the time. At that time the bank had 610 freestanding branches, making it the second-largest bank in the country by branch network.

== Ecobank network ==
Ecobank Nigeria is a member of Ecobank, the leading independent pan-African bank, headquartered in Lomé, Togo, with affiliates in West, Central and East Africa. Ecobank, which was established in 1985, has grown to a network of over 1,000 branches, employing over 10,000 people, with offices in 32 countries including Benin, Burkina Faso, Burundi, Cameroon, Cape Verde, the Central African Republic, Chad, the Republic of Congo, the Democratic Republic of Congo, Côte d'Ivoire, Gambia, Ghana, Guinea, Guinea Bissau, Kenya, Liberia, Mali, Malawi, Niger, Nigeria, Rwanda, Sao Tome, Senegal, Sierra Leone, Togo, Uganda, Zambia and Zimbabwe. Ecobank also maintains a banking subsidiary in Paris and representative offices in Johannesburg, Dubai and London.

== Parent company ==
Ecobank Transnational Inc. (ETI) is the parent company of the Ecobank Group, which includes the following specialized subsidiaries:

- Ecobank Development Corporation (EDC) – Lomé, Togo
- EDC Investment Corporation – Abidjan, Ivory Coast
- EDC Investment Corporation – Douala, Cameroon
- EDC Securities Limited – Lagos, Nigeria
- EDC Stockbrokers Limited – Accra, Ghana
- Ecobank Asset Management – Abidjan, Ivory Coast
- e-Process International SA – Lomé, Togo
- ECV Servicios – Praia, Cape Verde

The stock of ETI is traded on three African stock exchanges: the Ghana Stock Exchange (GSE), the Nigerian Stock Exchange (NSE) and the BRVM stock exchange in Abidjan, Ivory Coast.

== Branch network ==
As of December 2011, the expanded Ecobank Nigeria Limited. is projected to have in excess of 600 branches, in all parts of the Federal Republic of Nigeria, following the merger of Oceanic Bank.

== Legal disputes ==
=== Honeywell ===
The dispute between Honeywell Group is an ongoing legal battle over debt repayment, which commenced in 2015. Ecobank alleged that Honeywell owed it about N3.5 billion in unpaid loans. Honeywell subsequently insisted that it had fully repaid the debt and accused Ecobank of unfair practices. In 2018 Honeywell filed a suit claiming N72 billion in damages from the bank for reputational losses suffered as a result of the asset-freezing ex-parte order.

Honeywell sought the intervention of the Chartered Institute of Bankers of Nigeria's (CIBN) Sub-Committee on Ethics and Professionalism Bankers' Committee. At the end of the review of the arguments adduced by Honeywell and Ecobank, the Bankers' Committee ruled in Honeywell's favor by resolving that the payment of N3.5 billion by Honeywell was indeed full and final settlement of its obligations to Ecobank and Honeywell was not indebted to Ecobank.

The case has so far gone through various courts, including the Federal High Court, the Court of Appeal, and the Supreme Court of Nigeria. In 2022, the court ruled in favour of Honeywell, affirming that the company had settle its obligations. Ecobank has challenged the ruling.

=== Wilben Trade ===
In December 2024, a $68 million claim was launched in Dubai against Jeremy Awori, CEO of Ecobank Transnational Inc, and ETI's subsidiaries; ETI Special Resolutions Company (ETISRC), and its Managing Director, Oladele 'Dele' Alabi; Ecobank Nigeria Limited (commonly referred to as Ecobank Nigeria), on allegations of defamation, abusive proceedings, and coercion in Nigeria.

The defendants are alleged to have attempted to coerce Wilben Trade and its CEO, Marcus Wade, into making substantial undue payments to Ecobank Nigeria and ETISRC following a loss suffered in 2015, in what Wilben's legal counsel has described as an extortion attempt.

ETI's leadership, including CEO Awori, has reportedly been aware of ETISRC and its managing director Alabi's alleged extortion against Wilben Trade since August 2023 but has taken no action to stop it.

== Awards ==
It was awarded the Best Bank for SMEs in Nigeria in 2024 by Global Finance.

== See also ==
- Ecobank Transnational
- List of banks in Nigeria
- Economy of Nigeria
- Ecobank Ghana
- Ecobank Uganda
- Ecobank Zimbabwe
- List of banks in Africa.
