= Abena Amponsah Buansi =

Ghanaian judge

- Born: Ghana
- Education: Ghana School of Law
- Occupations: Judge, lawyer
- Years active: 2010–present
- Known for: Justice of the High Court, Treasurer of IAWJ Ghana Chapter
- Title: Justice of the High Court

Her Worship Abena Amponsah Buansi is a Ghanaian judge who has served as a Justice of the High Court of Ghana since February 2023. She is a member of the International Association of Women Judges (IAWJ) and currently serves as the Treasurer of Ghana's Chapter. Her judicial career, spanning over a decade, has been marked by rulings including a decision against Ecobank Ghana Limited for abuse of court process.

== Education ==
Justice Amponsah Buansi gained her legal education at the Ghana School of Law, where she obtained her professional law qualifications. She was subsequently called to the Ghana Bar in 2010, becoming an enrolled lawyer qualified to practise law in the Republic of Ghana.

== Career ==
Justice Amponsah Buansi's journey to the bench began in 2014, when she was appointed as a magistrate, marking the beginning of her formal judicial service. After her first appointment, she was elevated to the position of circuit judge, a role she held for approximately nine years until her promotion to the High Court.
