= Grace Muliisa =

Ugandan corporate executive

- Born: Uganda
- Education: Makerere University (Bachelor of Arts in Social Sciences); Bangor University (Chartered Banker MBA)
- Occupations: Banker and corporate executive
- Years active: 2011–present
- Title: Chief executive officer of Ecobank Uganda

Grace B. Muliisa, is a Ugandan banker and corporate executive, who in August 2021, was appointed as the managing director and chief executive officer of Ecobank Uganda Limited, a commercial bank in the country. Prior to that, she was the head of Personal and Business Banking at Stanbic Bank Uganda Limited, the largest commercial bank in Uganda by assets.

== Background and education ==
She attended local primary and secondary schools, before being admitted to Makerere University, Uganda's largest and oldest public university. She graduated with a Bachelor of Arts in Social Sciences degree from there, in 1998. Her second degree, a combined Chartered Banker MBA was awarded in 2018, by Bangor Business School, in Bangor, Wales, in the United Kingdom.

== Career ==
For a period of eight years, from 2011 until 2019, she was the country's head for retail clients at Standard Chartered Bank Uganda, based at the bank's headquarters in Kampala, the country's capital city. For the two years from 2017 until 2019, she was posted to Standard Chartered Singapore, on assignment by Standard Chartered Plc.

She then transferred to Stanbic Bank Uganda working as the head of Business Banking at the bank for one year. In July 2020 she became the head of both personal and business banking at the institution. In August 2021, she left Stanbic Bank and was hired as CEO of Ecobank Uganda.

== Other considerations ==
At Ecobank Uganda she replaced Annette Kihuguru, an executive director at the bank, who had been acting as the managing director since July 2020. Kihuguru retired after a 30-year career in banking. Muliisa's appointment was subject to the approval of the Bank of Uganda, the central bank and national banking regulator. As of October 2022, Muliisa is the substantive managing director and CEO of Ecobank Uganda.

== See also ==
- Standard Bank Group
- Ecobank Transnational
