= Trust Bank Limited =

Trust Bank Limited may refer to:

- Trust Bank Limited (Gambia), a bank in Gambia
- The Trust Bank Limited, a bank in Ghana
- Trust Bank Limited (Bangladesh), a bank in Bangladesh
