= Ecobank Uganda =

Commercial bank in Uganda

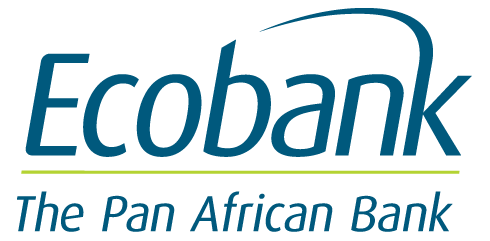
- Type: Public Company; GSE: ETI
- Industry: Financial services
- Founded: 2009
- Headquarters: 4 Parliament Avenue; Kampala, Uganda
- Key people: Henry Lubwama; Chairman; Grace Muliisa; CEO/Managing Director
- Products: Loans, savings, investments, debit cards, credit cards, mortgages
- Revenue: ▼Pretax:US$1.6 million (UGX:5.475 billion) (2014)
- Total assets: US$81.3 million (UGX:278.8 billion) (2014)
- Website: Homepage

Ecobank Uganda is a bank in Uganda that operates as a commercial bank under a license granted by the Bank of Uganda, the central bank and national banking regulator.

== Location ==
The headquarters of Ecobank Uganda are located at Plot 8A, Kafu Road, in the Central Division of Kampala, the capital and largest city of Uganda. The coordinates of the bank's headquarters are 0°18'47.0"N, 32°35'06.0"E (Latitude:0.32662; Longitude:32.58310).

== Overview ==
The bank began operations in Uganda on 19 January 2009 as a full-service bank. It provides wholesale, retail, investment, and transaction banking services and products to governments, financial institutions, multinationals, international organizations, businesses, and individuals.

As of 31 December 2014, the bank's total assets were UGX:278.8 billion, with shareholders' equity of UGX:46.9 billion.

== Ownership ==
Ecobank Uganda is a subsidiary of Ecobank Transnational, a banking conglomerate headquartered in Lomé, Togo.

== Board of directors ==
The following individuals sat on the board of directors of Ecobank (Uganda) as of 30 November 2021:

1. Kin Kariisa, chairman
2. Ehoumann Kasi, non-executive director
3. Gertrude K. Lutaaya, non-executive director
4. Grace Muliisa, Managing Director

== Management ==
Grace Muliisa is the managing director of Ecobank Uganda. Who is Grace Muliisa, The New Ecobank Managing Director?

== Branch network ==
As of December 2016, Ecobank Uganda maintained networked branches at the following locations:

Head office Branch - Kampala 8A Kafu Road 

1. Kireka Service Centre
2. EntebbeBranch - Entebbe Town
3. Lugogo Branch - Forest Mall, 3A2 & 3A3 Sports Lane, Lugogo, Kampala
4. Parliament Branch , Kampala
5. Jinja Branch - Jinja
6. Kikuubo Branch - Nakivubo Road, Kampala
7. Mbarara Branch, Main street Mbarara town
8. Nakasero Branch - Rwenzori Towers, Nakasero Road, Nakasero, Kampala
9. Ndeeba Branch - Masaka Road, Ndeeba, Kampala
10. Oasis Mall Branch - Oasis Mall, Yusuf Lule Road, Kampala
11. Wandegeya Branch - Bombo Road, Wandegeya, Kampala

== See also ==
- Ecobank
- Ecobank Ghana
- Ecobank Nigeria
- Ecobank Zimbabwe
- Charles Mbire
- List of banks in Uganda
- Banking in Uganda
