= Nigerian Consumer Credit Corporation =

Nigerian government institution

Nigerian Consumer Credit Corporation (CREDICORP) is a federal government owned development finance institution established in April 2024 to expand access to affordable consumer credit for working Nigerians.

== History ==
CREDICORP implemented Consumer Credit Scheme on 21 April 2024 initially targeting federal civil servants. CREDICORP operates as a wholesale financier and risk-sharing platform. It does not lend directly to individuals; instead, it partners with commercial banks, microfinance institutions, fintech companies, and cooperatives, providing capital lines and credit guarantees to support expanded retail lending.

In December 2024, Securing Consumer Access for Local Enterprises (S.C.A.L.E.) was launched for single-digit rate loans towards locally manufactured vehicles and solar solutions.

In January 2025, Ecobank Nigeria partnered with CREDICORP to offer affordable and flexible loans.
