= Johann Speth =

German organist and composer

Johann (Johannes) Speth (9 November 1664 – 12. Oktober 1728 Augsburg) was a German organist and composer. He was born in Speinshart, some 150 km from Nuremberg, but spent most of his life in Augsburg, where he worked as cathedral organist for two years. His only surviving music is a 1693 collection, Ars Magna Consoni et Dissoni, which includes toccatas, Magnificat versets and variations in the south German style.

== Life ==
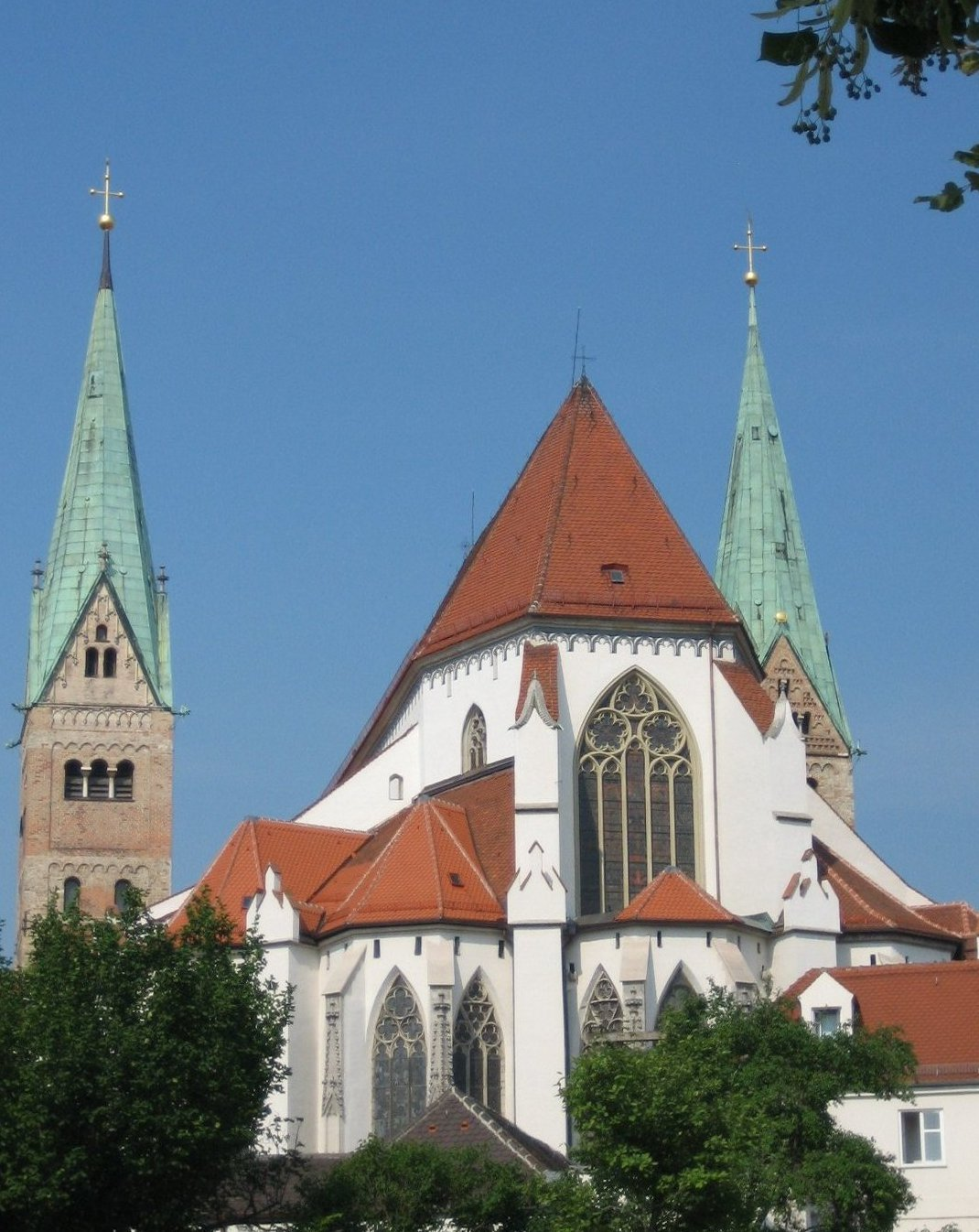
Augsburg Cathedral, where Speth worked as organist in 1692–94, and probably fulfilled other duties later in life.

Speth was born in Speinshart, Bavaria, to teacher Heinrich Speth and his wife Margareta (née Vichtl). Past scholars established that Speth must have received music lessons from the abbot of the Premonstratensian monastery at Speinshart, one Dominikus Lieblein; however, this has recently been disproven. Nothing is known about his life before 1692, when he applied for the position of organist of Augsburg Cathedral. The application, which contained Speth's compositions, was accepted, and he was appointed organist on 4 November 1692. The music he supplied with the application was published the next year in Augsburg as Ars magna Consoni et Dissoni. In the files of the cathedral administration there is a note from 1705 showing that Speth had also to work in the office of the cathedral chapter. There is a document that shows that in 1719, he still lived with his wife and a maidservant in Augsburg.

== Music ==
The composer's only surviving work is the collection published in 1693 in Augsburg, Ars magna Consoni et Dissoni. The title may be a reference to Athanasius Kircher's famous book, Musurgia universalis, sive ars magna consoni et dissoni (1650). An early description of the work was included by Johann Gottfried Walther in his Musikalisches Lexicon; Walther claimed Speth only compiled the pieces but did not compose. This hypothesis is now generally considered false.

Ars Magna contains music intended for organ or clavichord: ten toccatas (subtitled Musicalische Blumen-Felder), eight Magnificat settings, and three variation sets. The music has clearly traceable Italian influences, with direct borrowings: one of the variation sets is built on a theme by Bernardo Pasquini, there is also a passage from Bernardo Storace in the Spangioletta variation set, and a verset by Alessandro Poglietti (quinti toni no. 3). The influence of contemporary southern organists is also apparent, particularly that of Georg Muffat and Johann Caspar Ferdinand Fischer. The toccatas are unusually short for the genre; most consist of three (toccata-fugue-toccata) sections. There are some interesting features such as dynamic indications in Toccata quarta. The Magnificat settings are, like similar pieces by Johann Kaspar Kerll and others, short versets for alternatim practice.

== Works ==
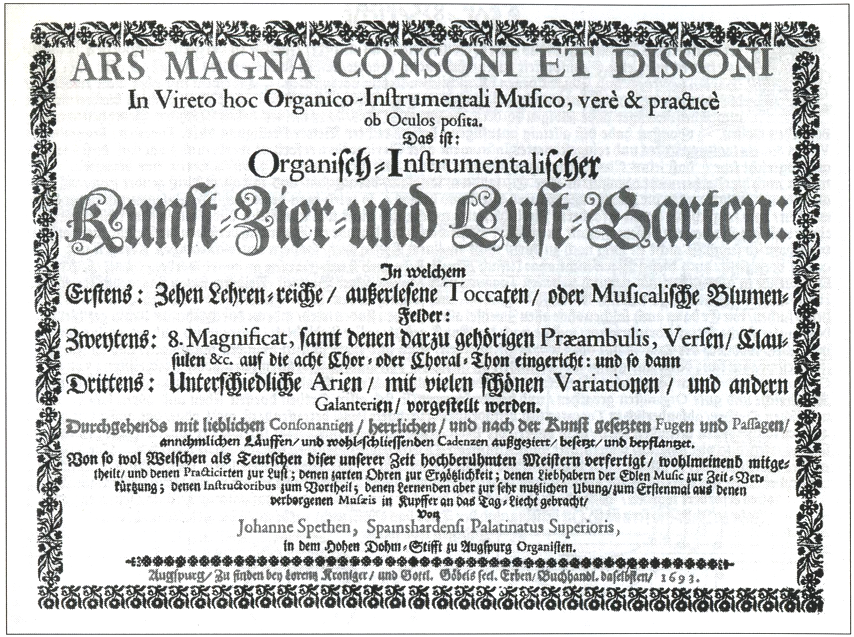
The title page of the original edition of Speth's Ars Magna.

- Ars magna Consoni et Dissoni in vireto hoc Organico-Instrumentali Musico, vere et practice ab Oculos posita. Das ist: Organisch-Instrumentalischer Kunst-, Zier- und Lust-Garten: in welchem Erstens: Zehen Lehren-reiche, ausserlesene Toccaten, oder Musicalische Blumen-Felder: Zweytens: 8 Magnificat, samt denen darzu gehörigen Praeambulis, Versen, Clausulen &c auf die acht Chor- oder Choral-Thon eingericht: und so dann Drittens: unterschiedliche Arien, mit vielen schönen Variationen, und anderen Galanterien vorgestellt werden (Augsburg, 1693)
