= Papa Madiaw Ndiaye =

Senegalese investor

Founding Partner and CEO of AFIG Funds
- Incumbent
- Assumed office December 2005

Chairman at Ecobank Transnational Inc
- Incumbent
- Assumed office June 2024
- Preceded by: Alain Francis Nkontchou

Personal details
- Born: Papa Madiaw Ndiaye; 29 September 1965 (age 61) Dakar, Senegal
- Education: Harvard College; Lauder Institute; Wharton School
- Occupation: Business executive
- Profession: Fund Management
- Portfolio: Business Finance

Papa Madiaw Ndiaye (born 29 September 1965) is a financier and investor, who was born and grew up in Senegal. He is the CEO of Advanced Finance and Investment Group (AFIG Funds), an African-owned private equity investment firm that he founded in 2005. In addition, since June 2024, Papa Madiaw has served as the Chairman of Ecobank Transnational Inc, a pan-African banking conglomerate, with banking operations in 33 African countries.

Prior to AFIG Funds, Papa had a rich career, working at global financial institutions including International Financial Corporation, JP Morgan and,Salomon Brothers, since 1988. Between 1996 and 2000, Papa Madiaw served at the IFC's investment department overlooking financial institutions establishment and investments in Africa. In 2000, Papa Madiaw was one of the three partners to raise and manage the AIG African Infrastructure Fund and managed through the Emerging Markets Partnership (EMP, now ECP) in Washington. In 2000, he was appointed Chairman of the National Council of Economic Advisors for President Abdoulaye Wade of Senegal. In 2004, he was inducted as Young Global Leader by the World Economic Forum of Davos. In 2018, he was awarded the Outstanding Leadership Award by the Private Equity Africa Awards.

== Biography ==
Papa Madiaw was born on 29 September 1965; he grew up in Dakar, Senegal, and completed his International Baccalaureate diploma at UWC Atlantic College in Wales. In 1984, Papa Madiaw attended Harvard College in the U.S., he graduated with a bachelor's degree in economics in 1988. In 1990, Papa Madiaw enrolled at the University of Pennsylvania's Lauder Institute in the U.S. to pursue a postgraduate degree, he earned there a master's degree in international affairs in 1992. Papa Madiaw also holds an MBA from the Wharton School of Business since 1992.

== Career ==
In 1988, after graduating from Harvard College, Papa Madiaw began his career at Salomon Brothers and joined JP Morgan's Emerging Markets Group in 1992. In 1994, he launched JP Morgan's securities trading business in Africa and the Middle East. Between 1996 and 2000, Papa Madiaw held senior positions for the International Finance Corporation's (IFC) equity and debt investment activities, capital markets, and financial institutions in Africa.

In 2000, Papa Madiaw was appointed as the Special Advisor for Economic and Financial Affairs to the President of the Republic of Senegal, Abdoulaye Wade, and the Chairman of the Senegalese Presidential Economic and Financial Advisory Council. In the same year, he launched the MIDROC BVI, a direct investment vehicle for Sheikh Mohammed Al-Amoudi. Papa Madiaw served as director and was one of three partners who raised the $407 million fund of the AIG African Infrastructure, which when launched in 2000, was the largest pan-African fund. Papa Madiaw has served on the board of several organizations, including the African Private Equity and Venture Capital Association (AVCA). He currently serves as Chairman of Ecobank Transnational Inc.

== AFIG Funds ==
In December 2005, Papa Madiaw founded the Advanced Finance and Investment Group (AFIG Funds). AFIG Funds is a fund management company domiciled in Mauritius with offices in Dakar (Senegal), Johannesburg (South Africa), and Washington, DC (USA), founded to invest in profitable or growing companies in Africa. In July 2008, the first fund was launched by the AFIG team, named Atlantic Coast Regional Fund (ACRF), with total commitments of US$122.5m and covering 29 countries in West, Central, and East Africa. Through ACRF, AFIG invested in multisector companies including FSDH Holding, Primrose Properties, Ecobank Rwanda, and Senbus Industries to mention a few.

AFIG's second fund, named AFIG Fund II, was launched in 2016 with total commitments of US$135.1m and covering 32 countries in West, Central, and East Africa. Through AFIG Fund II, AFIG invested in companies like Tecnicil Indústria, First Atlantic Bank, NEM Insurance, FSDH Holding Company, and Nouvelle Mici Embaci to mention a few.

== Recognitions ==
- 2004: Papa Madiaw was chosen as a Young Global Leader by the World Economic Forum in Davos.
- 2009: Papa Madiaw was recognized as one of the Frontier 100 CEOs.
- 2018: Papa Madiaw was awarded the Outstanding Leadership Award by Private Equity Africa Awards.
