= ECOWAS Bank for Investment and Development =

Financial arm of ECOWAS

Bank for Investment and Development (EBID)
- Industry: International development
- Predecessor: ECOWAS Fund
- Founded: 1999; 27 years ago
- Headquarters: Lomé, Togolese Republic
- Products: Development loans, equity participation, lines of credit and refinancing
- Owner: Economic Community of West African States (ECOWAS)
- Website: www.bidc-ebid.org/en/

The ECOWAS Bank for Investment and Development (EBID) is a leading regional investment and development bank, owned by the fifteen Economic Community of West African States (ECOWAS) Member States.

EBID's aim is provide international development by financing developmental projects and programmes covering diverse initiatives from infrastructure and basic amenities, rural development and environment, industry, and social services sectors, through its private and public sector windows. EBID intervenes through long, medium, and short-term loans, equity participation, lines of credit, refinancing, financial engineering operations, and related services.

EBID emerged as a banking group after the transformation of the Fund for Cooperation, Compensation and Development of ECOWAS in 1999.

== History ==
The ECOWAS Fund was established in 1975 at the same time as the erstwhile Executive Secretariat of the Economic Community of West African States (which would become the ECOWAS Commission) and commenced operations in 1979.

EBID started operations in 1999 as a holding company with two specialised subsidiaries:

- ECOWAS Regional Development Fund (ERDF) for financing the public sector; and
- ECOWAS Regional Investment Bank (ERIB) for financing the private sector.

In 2006, the ECOWAS Authority of Heads of State and Government agreed to reorganise the EBID Group into one unified entity with two windows: one for promoting the private sector and the other, for developing the public sector in order to extend the services of the Bank to a wider range of stakeholders involved in sustainable economic development activities and programmes at national and regional levels. The Bank has been operating under this structure since January 2007. The headquarters of the Bank is in Lomé, Togolese Republic.

== Mission and Objectives ==
The mission of EBID is to contribute towards creating the conditions capable of enhancing the emergence of an economically strong, industrialised and prosperous West Africa that is perfectly integrated both internally, and in the global economic system in order to benefit from and take advantage of the opportunities and prospects offered by globalisation.

By virtue of its Articles of Association the Bank aims to:

- Contribute to attaining the objectives of the Community by supporting infrastructure projects relating to regional integration or any other development projects in the public and private sectors; and
- Assist in the development of the Community by funding special programmes.

== Conditions for Intervention ==
EBID financial and technical assistance is open to the following entities:

- ECOWAS Member States or their agencies;
- Public companies, private companies and mixed enterprise corporations of ECOWAS Member States;
- Local financial institutions;
- Corporate bodies from ECOWAS Member States or from foreign countries desirous of investing in the ECOWAS zone, in sectors within EBID’s areas of intervention.

== Organisation and Management ==
The EBID decision-making bodies are:

- Board of Governors
- Board of Director
- President

The Board of Governors is the highest decision-making body and has oversight functions over the Bank’s management and administration. The Board of Directors is responsible for general operations of the Bank. The President is responsible for the day-to-day management of EBID and his powers are defined in the Bank's Articles of Association. The President is assisted by two Vice-Presidents namely, the Vice-President of Finance and Corporate Services and the Vice-President of Operations.

== Areas of Intervention ==
Operational activities of EBID are intended to lay the foundation for the sustainable development of Member States of the Community through the financing of regional and national (public and private) projects. The Bank operates primarily in the following areas:

- Energy
- Transport
- Health
- Water
- Finance
- Agriculture
- Education
- Industry

== Modes of Intervention ==
EBID intervenes in the form of:

- Long, Medium and Short-Term Loans
- Equity Participation
- Granting of Lines of Credit and Putting in Place Framework Agreements for Refinancing
- Issue and Guarantee of Loans, Debentures, Bonds and Other Securities
- Financial Engineering Operations and Services

== Some Key Achievements ==
ECOWAS Bank for Investment and Development (EBID) is a founding shareholder in Ecobank Transnational Inc. and ASKY Airlines. Other notable achievement of EBID are:

- Decades of experience in project financing within and among ECOWAS Member States;
- Major partner for regional integration programmes and implementation of public-private sector partnerships in Member States;
- Initiator of the African Biofuels and Renewable Energy Fund (ABREF) now ABREC;
- Partner and Manager of the Cultural Industries Guarantee Fund (CIGF).

== Partnerships ==
Within the scope of its corporate object, EBID cooperates with national and sub-regional development organisations operating within ECOWAS. In the same vein, it cooperates with other international organisations with similar aims and other institutions involved in the development of the sub-region. EBID partnered with Deutsche Gesellschaft für Internationale Zusammenarbeit and International Fertilizer Development Center in 2019 and 2020 respectively to achieve common goals. EBID jas also partnered with West African Economic and Monetary Union (WAEMU) Market, Afreximbank, Banque Marocaine du Commerce Exterieur (BMCE), OPEC Funds for International Development (OFID), Industrial Development Corporation (IDC), Arab Bank for Economic Development in Africa (BADEA), India Exim Bank, and Islamic Bank of Development (IsDB).
