= Eschenbach in der Oberpfalz (Verwaltungsgemeinschaft) =

- Verwaltungsgemeinschaft
- Location of Eschenbach in der Oberpfalz within Neustadt an der Waldnaab district
- Interactive map of Eschenbach in der Oberpfalz
- Location within Germany Location within Bavaria
- Coordinates: 49°45′N 11°50′E
- Country: Germany
- State: Bavaria
- Admin. region: Upper Palatinate
- District: Neustadt an der Waldnaab
- Seat: Eschenbach in der Oberpfalz
- Subdivisions: 3 municipalities

Area
  - Total: 79.2 km^{2} (30.6 sq mi)

Population (2025-12-31)
  - Total: 6,647
  - Density: 83.9/km^{2} (217/sq mi)
- Time zone: UTC+01:00 (CET)
  - Summer (DST): UTC+02:00 (CEST)
- Website: www.vg-eschenbach.de

Eschenbach in der Oberpfalz is a Verwaltungsgemeinschaft (municipal association) in the district of Neustadt an der Waldnaab in Bavaria, Germany. Its seat is in Eschenbach in der Oberpfalz.

It consists of the following municipalities:

1. Eschenbach in der Oberpfalz
2. Neustadt am Kulm
3. Speinshart
