= Neustadt am Kulm =

- Town
- Coat of arms

- Location of Neustadt am Kulm within Neustadt a.d.Waldnaab district
- Interactive map of Neustadt am Kulm
- Location within Germany Location within Bavaria
- Coordinates: 49°49′N 11°49′E
- Country: Germany
- State: Bavaria
- Admin. region: Oberpfalz
- District: Neustadt a.d.Waldnaab
- Municipal assoc.: Eschenbach in der Oberpfalz
- Subdivisions: 9 Ortsteile

Government
  - Mayor (2020–26): Wolfgang Haberberger

Area
  - Total: 20.3 km^{2} (7.8 sq mi)
- Elevation: 517 m (1,696 ft)

Population (2025-12-31)
  - Total: 1,166
  - Density: 57.4/km^{2} (149/sq mi)
- Time zone: UTC+01:00 (CET)
  - Summer (DST): UTC+02:00 (CEST)
- Postal codes: 95514
- Dialling codes: 09648
- Vehicle registration: NEW
- Website: www.neustadt-am-kulm.de

Neustadt am Kulm (German pronunciation: [ˈnɔʏʃtat ʔam ˈkʊlm], lit. 'Neustadt on the Kulm') is a municipality in the district of Neustadt an der Waldnaab, in Bavaria, Germany. It is situated 29 km northwest of Weiden in der Oberpfalz, and 23 km southeast of Bayreuth. Neustadt am Kulm is situated directly west of the Rauher Kulm.

== Mayors ==
Since 2008 Wolfgang Haberberger is the mayor of Neustadt am Kulm. He was re-elected in 2014 and 2020. His predecessor was Rudolf Lang (CSU).

=== Natural monuments ===
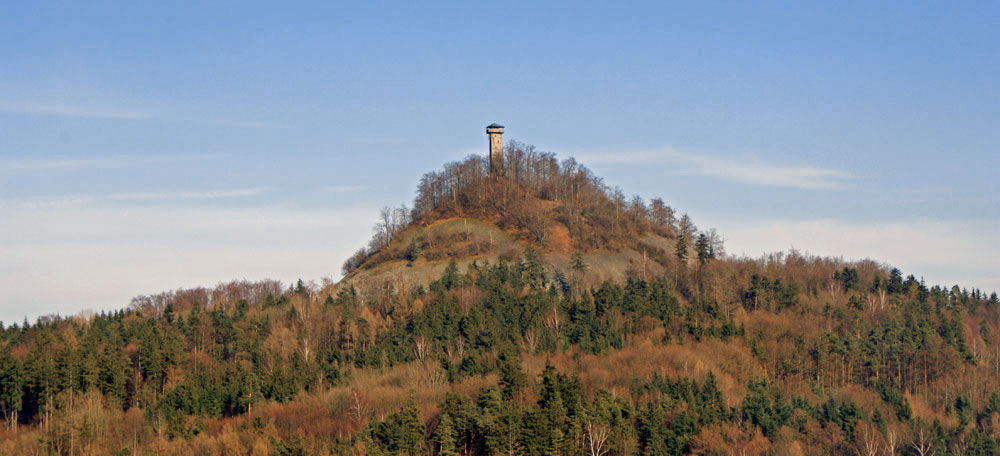
View of the Rauher Kulm

The most important sight is the 682-metre-high Rauher Kulm with its 25-metre-high viewing tower. Since 1949 it has been protected as a natural monument. On the mountain is the rock formation of Kleiner Kulm and, east of the Rauher Kulm is the Kühhübel, whose basalt kuppe has been almost entirely quarried away.

The medieval hilltop castles on the two Kulms were destroyed in 1554. Only fragmentary remains have survived: the burgstalls of Rauhenkulm Castle and Schlechtenkulm Castle.

The Rauher Kulm was selected in a survey by the Heinz Sielmann Stiftung EUROPARC Deutschland as Germany's most beautiful natural wonder for 2013. Twenty-one natural monuments were chosen from the national natural landscapes and other regions of Germany. Second place went to the Steinerne Rose near Saalburg-Ebersdorf. In third place was the Stiefel rock formation near St. Ingbert.

== Personalities ==
- Georg Jacob Schaeffler (1865-1962), grandfather of Georg Schaeffler, (born 1964) businessman of the Schaeffler Group
