= The Trust Bank =

- Type: Private
- Industry: Financial services
- Founded: 1996
- Headquarters: Accra, Ghana
- Key people: Albert D. Osei (chairman); Larry Yirenkyi-Boafo (managing director)
- Products: Loans, checking, savings, investments, debit cards
- Total assets: US$204.7+ million (2009)
- Number of employees: 411 (2010)
- Website: Homepage

The Trust Bank Limited, commonly known as The Trust Bank (TTB), is a commercial bank in Ghana. It is one of the 27 commercial banks licensed by the Bank of Ghana, the banking regulator in the country.

== Overview ==
TTB is a medium-sized financial services provider in Ghana. As of December 2009, the bank's total assets were valued at approximately US$205 million (GHS:311.75 million), with shareholders' equity of about US$27 million (GHS:40.73 million).

== History ==
The bank was founded in 1996 and commenced provision of banking services on 14 October 1996, following the issuance of a banking license by the Bank of Ghana. The Trust Bank is a retail bank that focuses on meeting the banking needs of small and medium-sized enterprises (SMEs).

== Ownership ==
The shares of stock of TTB are owned by Ghanaian and International corporate investors. The shareholding in the bank is depicted in the table below:

The Trust Bank stock ownership
Rank	Name of owner	Percentage ownership
1	Social Security and National Insurance Trust of Ghana (SSNIT)	61.14
2	Holding COFIPA based in France	13.50
3	Netherlands Development Finance Company (FMO)	10.00
4	Ghana Re-Insurance Company Limited	09.36
5	African Tiger Mutual Fund of Ghana	06.00
	Total	100.00

== Branch network ==
As of February 2011, The Trust Bank maintains a network of 20 networked branches at the following locations:

- Main Branch - Reinsurance House, 68 Kwame Nkrumah Avenue, Accra
- Trust Towers Branch - Sobukwe Road (Farrar) Avenue, Accra
- Okofo House Branch - Kwame Nkrumah Avenue, Adabraka, Accra
- Kantamanto Branch - Tarzan House, Near Hotel De Horses, Accra
- Tesano Branch - Tesano, Accra
- Madina Branch - Old Road Taxi Rank, Accra
- Tema Community 1 Branch - Community 1, Tema
- Tema Main Branch - Hospital Road, Tema
- Sakumono Branch - Ocean Wave Hotel, Sakumono
- Post Office Square Branch - opposite General Post Office, Accra
- Budumburam Branch - Budumburam, Central Region
- Harper Road Branch - Harper Road, Adum, Kumasi
- Suame Magazine Branch - Offinso Road, Suame, Kumasi
- Ashhtown Branch - Dr. Mensah Traffic Light, Kumasi
- Kwashieman Branch - Kwashieman, Accra
- Kissieman Branch - Kissieman, near J. B. Plaza
- Dede Plaza Branch - Spintex Road, Accra
- Kwabenya Branch - Kwabenya, Accra
- Okponglo Branch - Okponglo, Accra
- Kasoa Branch - Kasoa

== Takeover and merger ==
In December 2011, the Bank of Ghana approved the takeover of The Trust Bank by Ecobank Transnational and the merger of the acquired institution with Ecobank Ghana.

== See also ==
- List of banks in Ghana
- Economy of Ghana
