= Abena Osei-Poku =

Ghanaian corporate executive

- Born: 1971 (age 54–55); Ghana
- Education: University of Ghana (Bachelor of Arts in Economics and Statistics); Alliance Manchester Business School (Master of Business Administration)
- Occupations: Banker and Corporate Executive
- Years active: since 2002
- Title: Managing Director, Ecobank Ghana and Regional Executive, AWA Region

Abena Osei-Poku, (née: Abena Osei), is a Ghanaian corporate executive and the Managing Director of Ecobank Ghana and Regional Executive for the Anglophone West Africa (AWA) Region of the Ecobank Group. She was the former managing director and chief executive officer of Absa Bank Ghana (formerly Barclays Bank of Ghana), where she served as the managing Director for five years since September 2018 to December 2023. Before that, she worked at Absa in South Africa, where she was responsible for Corporate & Investment Banking in East and West Africa at the level of Managing Director.

== Background and education ==
She was born in Ghana around 1971. She attended Ghanaian elementary and secondary schools. She was admitted to the University of Ghana, graduating in 1994 with a Bachelor of Arts degree in Economics and Statistics. Later, she received a Master of Business Administration from the University of Manchester in the United Kingdom.

== Career ==
Abena Osei-Poku started her banking career at Standard Chartered Bank in 2002, working there for seven years. In 2009, she transferred to Barclays Bank. She spent part of the next nine years serving as an executive director at Barclays Bank Ghana and the rest of the time in South Africa, serving as an executive of the Barclays Africa Group, responsible for operations in Africa, outside of South Africa. In September 2018, she was appointed as the managing director of Barclays Bank of Ghana, replacing Patience Akyianu, who left the bank. In February 2020, Abena oversaw the transformation of Barclays Bank Ghana to Absa Bank Ghana.

In January 2024, she was appointed as the Managing Director of Ecobank Ghana and the Regional Executive for the Anglophone West Africa (AWA) Region.

== Other considerations ==
She has in the past sat on the boards of several enterprises, including (a) Airtel Mobile Money Limited (b) Barclays Africa Group (c) United Kingdom and Ghana Chamber of Commerce and (d) Country Kitchen Limited.

As at October 2021, she is the chairperson of the advisory board of the College of Health Sciences at the University of Ghana. She also serves as the vice chairperson of the board of the Ghana Stock Exchange, and is a member of the executive councils of the Ghana Association of Banks and the National Banking College. In addition, she is an Honorary Fellow of the Chartered Institute of Marketing Ghana and an honorary member of the Chartered Institute of Bankers.

== See also ==
- List of financial institutions in Ghana
