= Bradfield, Zimbabwe =

Bradfield
- Map of Zimbabwe showing the location of Bradfield; Placement on map is approximate
- Coordinates: 20°10′40″S 28°35′06″E
- Country: Zimbabwe
- Province: Matabeleland North
- District: Bulawayo District
- City: Bulawayo
- Time zone: UTC+2 (CAT)

Bradfield is a neighbourhood in the city of Bulawayo, Zimbabwe.

== Location ==
Bradfield is located in Bulawayo District, Matabeleland North Province, in the city of Bulawayo, the second-largest business and industrial center in Zimbabwe, after the capital, Harare, located approximately 460 kilometres (286 mi), by road, to the northeast.

Bradfield is bordered by 16th Street to the north, Bulawayo Golf Club and Lions Golf Club to the east, 23rd Avenue and Burns Drive to the south and by Angus Road to the west. Matopos Road runs from 16th Street to 23rd Avenue, in a north to south direction in the neighbourhood. Hillside Road also runs in a north to south direction through the Bradfield. The geographic coordinates of the neighbourhood are:20° 10' 40.00"S, 28° 35' 6.00"E (Latitude:-20.177778; Longitude:28.585000).

== Overview ==
Bradfield, Zimbabwe is an upscale residential and commercial neighbourhood in Bulawayo. Commercial enterprises like banks, doctors' and dentists' offices and a shopping mall are located on Hillside Road. Upscale single-family homes occupy the rest of the neighbourhood.

== History ==
The suburb was named after Edwin Eugene Bradfield, one of the first Europeans to settle in the neighbourhood.

== Population ==
The exact population of Bradfield, Zimbabwe is not known as of August 2011.

== Points of interest ==
The points of interest within Bradfield or close to its borders, include the following:

- Hellenic Community Hall
- A branch of Ecobank Zimbabwe
- Mater Dei Hospital – A private hospital, located to the immediate south of Bradfield on Burns Drive
- Bradfield Shopping Center – At the corner of Hillside Road and Burns Drive
- Bulawayo Golf Club – Located to the immediate east of Bradfield
- Bulawayo Golf Club – Located to the immediate east of Bradfield

== See also ==
- Bulawayo
- Matabeleland North
