= Eschenbach in der Oberpfalz =

- Town
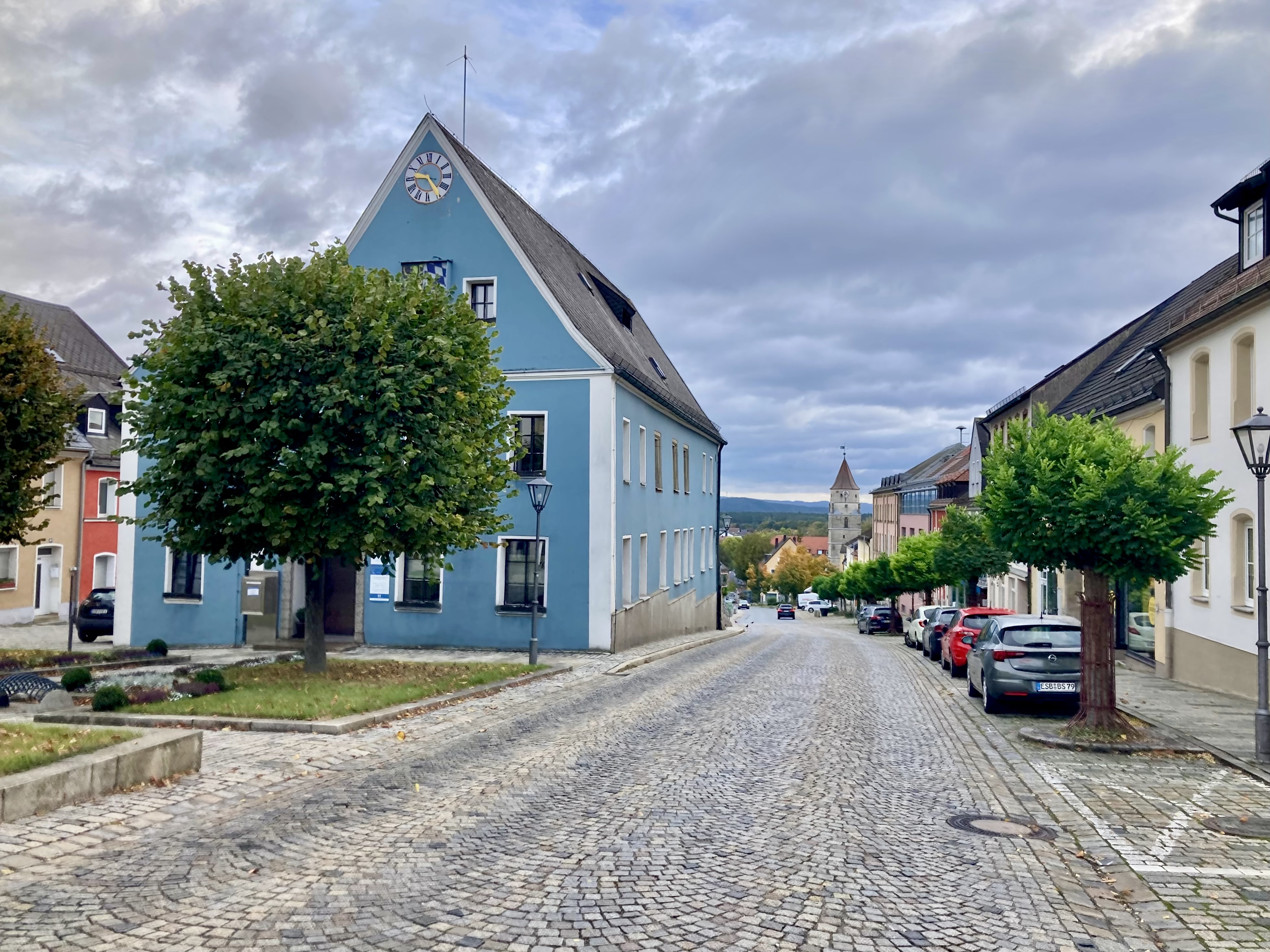
- View of the Main Street with the Rathaus. Eschenbach i.d. Oberpfalz, Germany

- Coat of arms

- Location of Eschenbach in der Oberpfalz within Neustadt a.d.Waldnaab district
- Interactive map of Eschenbach in der Oberpfalz
- Location within Germany Location within Bavaria
- Coordinates: 49°45′N 11°49′E
- Country: Germany
- State: Bavaria
- Admin. region: Oberpfalz
- District: Neustadt a.d.Waldnaab
- Municipal assoc.: Eschenbach in der Oberpfalz
- Subdivisions: 16 Ortsteile

Government
  - Mayor (2020–26): Marcus Gradl (CSU)

Area
  - Total: 35.13 km^{2} (13.56 sq mi)
- Elevation: 440 m (1,440 ft)

Population (2025-12-31)
  - Total: 4,370
  - Density: 124/km^{2} (322/sq mi)
- Time zone: UTC+01:00 (CET)
  - Summer (DST): UTC+02:00 (CEST)
- Postal codes: 92676
- Dialling codes: 09645
- Vehicle registration: NEW, ESB, VOH
- Website: www.eschenbach-opf.de

Eschenbach in der Oberpfalz (German pronunciation: [ˈɛʃnbax ʔɪn deːɐ̯ ˈʔoːbɐˌpfalts], lit. 'Eschenbach in the Upper Palatinate') is a town in the district of Neustadt an der Waldnaab, in Bavaria, Germany. It is situated 25 km west of Neustadt an der Waldnaab, 30 km west of Weiden in der Oberpfalz, and 28 km southeast of Bayreuth. It is also about 1 km north of the large US military base in Grafenwöhr. The church is the most popular site, the carving dedicated to the daughter-in-law of Charles XI of Sweden, Anna Svetl, who drowned in the Rhine in 1752, the carving reading, "Here Lies our Mother: Anna Svetl who died in the waters of the Rhine in the year seventeen hundred and fifty two. Even when the Death angel came for her, she said her final words, "A man shall perish but his memories shant for the rest of the Earth" Bless Her."
