= Efficient Basing-Grafenwöhr =

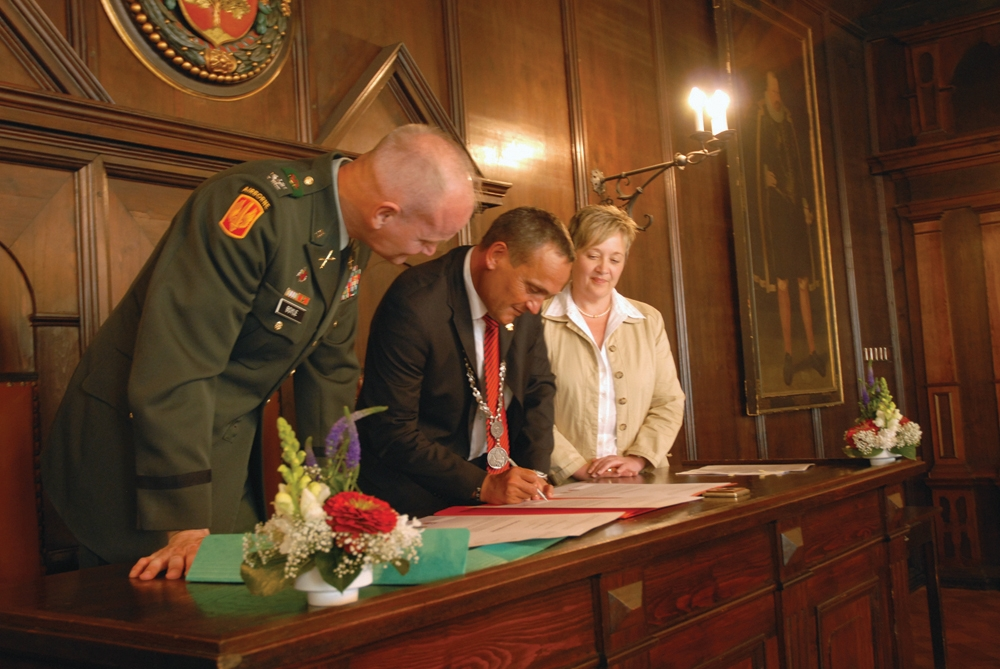
Colonel Brian Boyle, commander of U.S. Army Garrison Grafenwoehr, and the German city of Weiden Lord Mayor Kurt Seggewiß signed a partnership agreement on May 28, 2008

Efficient Basing Grafenwöhr (EBG) was a Seventh United States Army (USAREUR) initiative conducted in Grafenwöhr, Germany, from 2003 to 2011. The purpose was to consolidate command and control headquarters and six battalion-sized elements in support of Army and USAREUR transformation. The goal of the EBG initiative is to enhance training readiness, improve force protection, and provide new or renovated facilities and excellent quality-of-life facilities for Soldiers and families.

The Military Construction Army (MCA) and Payment in kind (PIK) funded portion of EBG encompasses more than 85 projects with a value of $689 million. Construction on the program covers fiscal years 2003-2011. It includes demolition, construction of the new Brigade Combat Team area, troop and operational areas, and renovation/conversion of existing facilities to support the realignment of community functions. Site utility systems will be privatized in accordance with USAREUR and Army policies. Specialized community support facilities, such as community clubs, commissary, medical, post exchange, and schools are provided through their appropriate responsible agencies, at a total value of over $75 million.

The U.S. Army Corps of Engineers, Europe District has established an EBG Program Office on site to more effectively integrate with the local Directorate of Public Works (DPW) office and Bauamt offices. The program support Army transformation in Europe through partnership with the U.S. Garrison Grafenwoehr and the U.S. Army Europe Deputy Chief of Staff for Engineering.

Finally, the program includes a unique initiative to support a Gated community for family housing, known as "Netzaberg Housing Area" in Eschenbach in der Oberpfalz. This community consists of 835 build-to-lease housing units with an integrated military-construction funded village center, including an elementary and middle school, chapel, child development center, youth services center, shoppette (AAFES), and sports fields.
