= Rauher Kulm =

Mountain in Germany

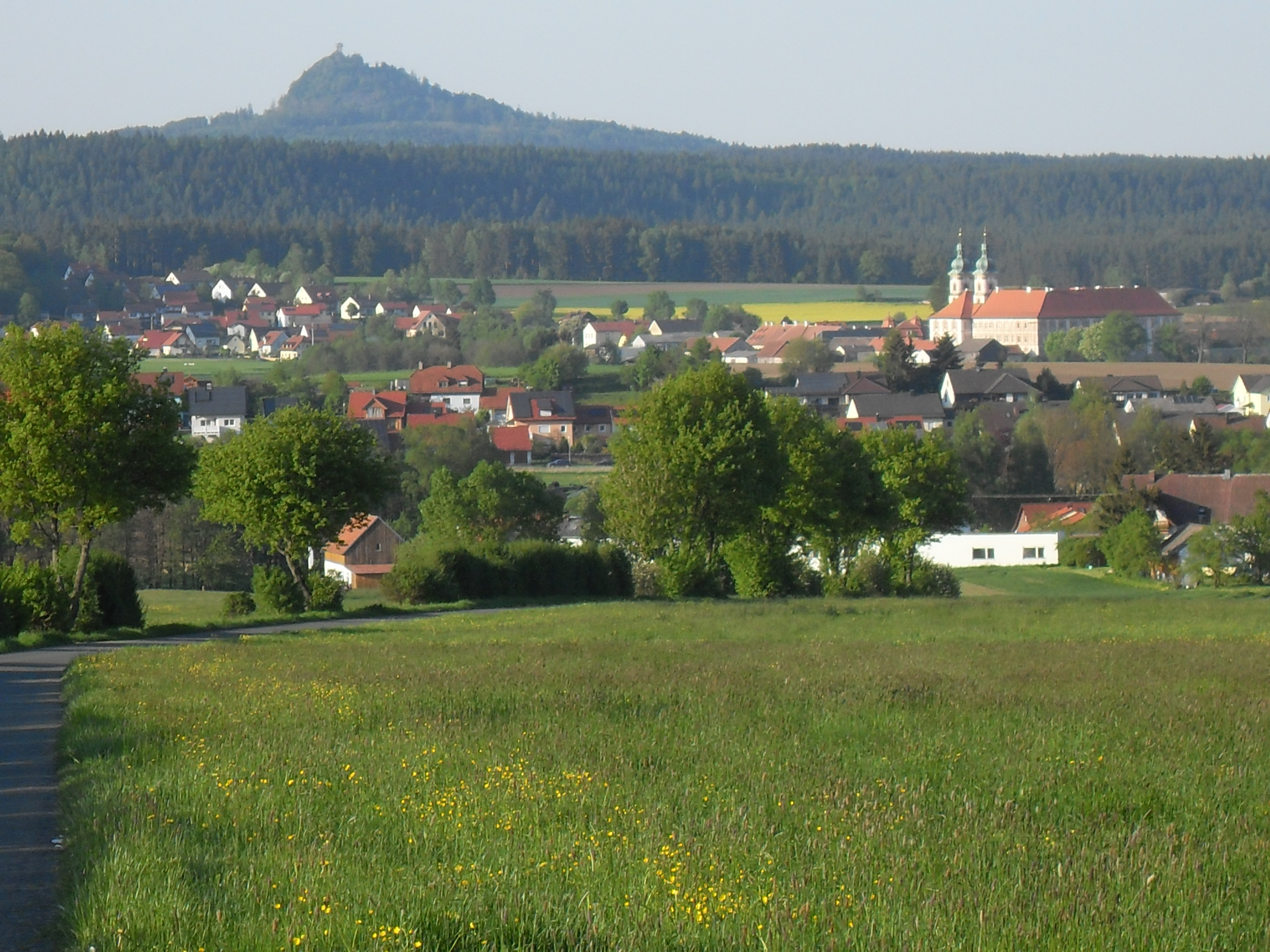
- The Rauher Kulm behind Speinshart, Germany

Highest point
- Elevation: 681 m (2,234 ft)
- Prominence: 219 m (719 ft)
- Parent peak: Muckenreuther Rangen (line parent)
- Isolation: 8.84 km (5.49 mi) to Kühberg
- Coordinates: 49°49′44″N 11°50′58″E

Geography
- Location within Germany
- Location: Germany

Geology
- Mountain type: Basalt

The Rauher Kulm (German pronunciation: [ˈʁaʊɐ ˈkʊlm]) is a small basalt mountain located in the Upper Palatinate (Oberpfalz) region of the state of Bavaria, Germany. It is located 23 kilometers southeast of Bayreuth and 5 kilometers south of Kemnath. The town of Neustadt am Kulm is situated at the base of the western side of the mountain.

The mountain is 681 meters (2,234 ft) tall and has a 25-meter (82 ft) tall observation tower at its peak. The observation tower offers views of the northern Franconian Switzerland, the southern wall of the Fichtel Mountains, and the Upper Palatinate Forest. Since 1949, the mountain has been protected as a federal monument in the Northern Upper Palatinate Forest Nature Park. There are several well marked hiking paths up the mountain and around the surrounding forests.

The mountain is one of the most imposing basalt mountains of Bavaria. According to the Bavarian State Geology Office, during the Tertiary, now also called Paleocene-Pliocene period, a number of active volcanoes produced liquid magma in Northern Bavaria, mostly due to the continental collision of Europe and Africa. As a result, not only the Alps but a number of fissure vents and cracks began to form throughout central Europe where magma could rise. Most of the Rauher Kulm's magma cooled below the surface.

During the Middle Ages a castle was built on top of the Rauher Kulm. During the Second Margrave War the castle was destroyed after a prolonged siege.
