= Grafenwöhr =

- Town
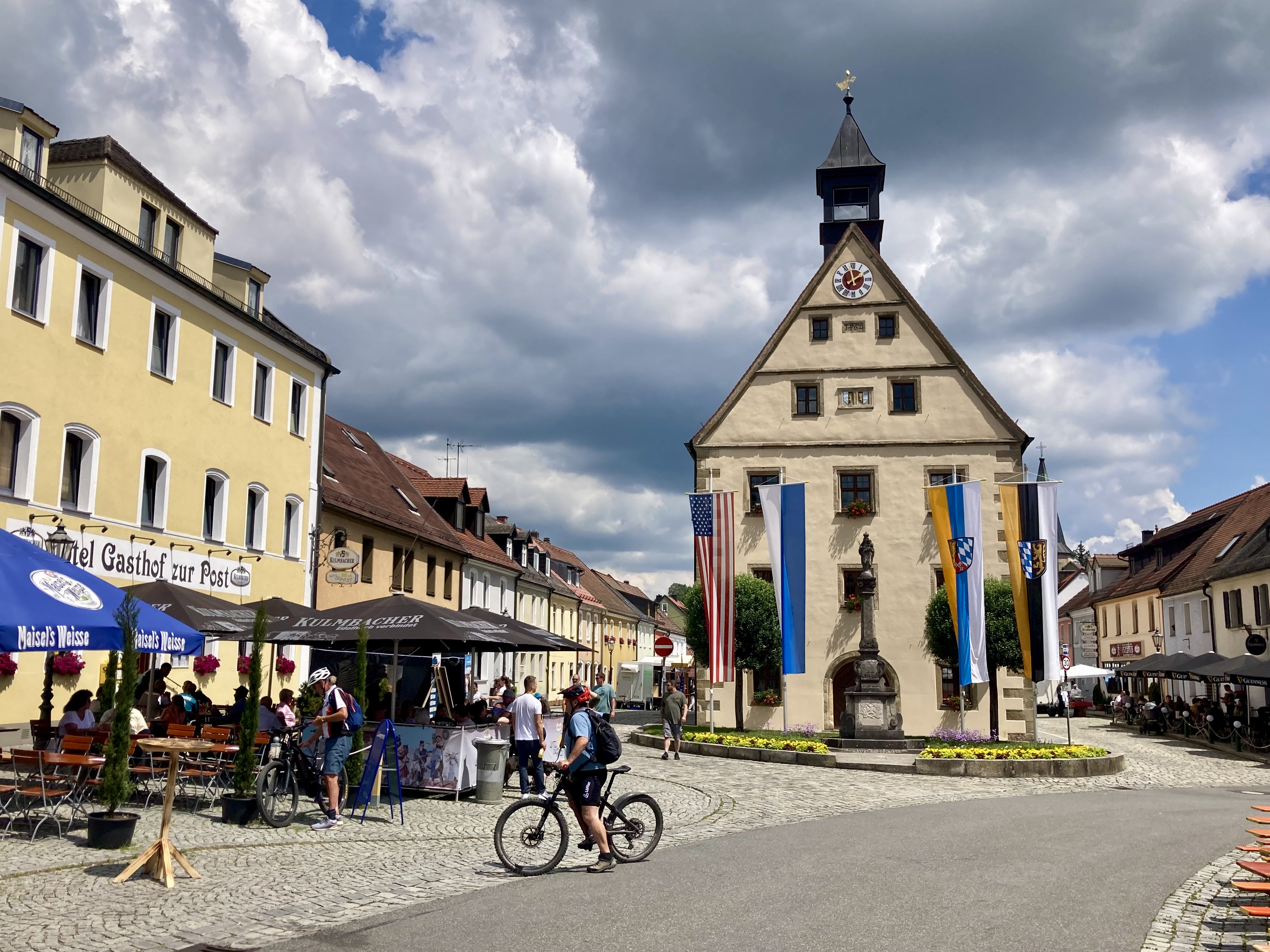
- Grafenwöhr Altstadt, Germany

- Coat of arms

- Location of Grafenwöhr within Neustadt a.d.Waldnaab district
- Interactive map of Grafenwöhr
- Location within Germany Location within Bavaria
- Coordinates: 49°43′N 11°54′E
- Country: Germany
- State: Bavaria
- Admin. region: Upper Palatinate
- District: Neustadt a.d.Waldnaab
- Subdivisions: 12 Ortsteile bzw. Stadtbezirke

Government
  - Mayor (2020–26): Edgar Knobloch (CSU)

Area
  - Total: 216.21 km^{2} (83.48 sq mi)
- Elevation: 410 m (1,350 ft)

Population (2025-12-31)
  - Total: 6,347
  - Density: 29.36/km^{2} (76.03/sq mi)
- Time zone: UTC+01:00 (CET)
  - Summer (DST): UTC+02:00 (CEST)
- Postal codes: 92655
- Dialling codes: 09641
- Vehicle registration: NEW
- Website: www.grafenwoehr.de

Grafenwöhr (German pronunciation: [ɡʁaːfn̩ˈvøːɐ̯], Northern Bavarian: Groafawehr) is a town in the district of Neustadt an der Waldnaab, in the region of the Upper Palatinate (German: Oberpfalz) in eastern Bavaria, Germany. It is widely known for the United States Army military installation and training area, called Grafenwoehr Training Area (Tower Barracks), located directly south and west of the town.

== History ==
=== Early history ===
The town of Grafenwöhr (Island of the Count), was founded in the 9th century on an island (wöhr), located between the river Creussen and the Thum stream. In its early history, the inhabitants and the town of Grafenwöhr proper belonged to nobles from Schweinfurt, Bamberg, and Leuchtenberg.

=== 20th century ===
In 1907, Prince Luitpold, regent of the Kingdom of Bavaria, selected the area near the town of Grafenwöhr as the place best suited for training of the Bavarian Army (1806–1919). Construction began in 1908, and, by 1915, the training reservation was 96 square kilometres (37 sq mi) in area. The first artillery round was fired in the training area at 08:00 on 30 June 1910. Throughout World War I (1914–1918) the Grafenwöhr training area was used for equipping and training army units for combat. After the War, the High Command, Berlin, used Grafenwöhr to train the 100,000–man German army, allowed by the Treaty of Versailles (1919).

In 1936, the Nazi Government expanded the training area to the present size of 230 square kilometres (90 sq mi). On 5 and 8 April 1945, the training camp and the town of Grafenwöhr proper were bombed during Allied air raids. The last German Army Commander of the Grafenwöhr training area surrendered to the U.S. Army on 20 April 1945. Afterwards, during the Cold War (1945–1991), the Grafenwöhr training area was an important combined arms training site for the U.S. Army and Allied forces.

=== Post Cold War ===
The military installation is also home to one of the largest Army construction projects in Europe, called Efficient Basing-Grafenwöhr. The Grafenwöhr Training Area (Tower Barracks) houses the 7th Army Joint Multinational Training Command (JMTC). The 7th Army JMTC owns almost all of the U.S. Army training facilities and assets in Europe. The Grafenwöhr Training Area is one of its largest training areas and includes ranges that can accommodate nearly every weapons system currently used.

Though operated by the U.S. Army, the area is the largest multinational training area in Europe. Grafenwöhr Training Area is (Tower Barracks), also known as the East Camp, is the main post and is located on the north east edge of the training area. The Vilseck military community, also known as Rose Barracks, or the South Camp, is on the southern boundary.

The Grafenwöhr Army Airfield provides air flow to all air traffic requesting services including but not limited C-130's from the 37th Airlift Squadron at Ramstein AB, Germany. The airfield is staffed 24 hours a day by advisory services and at a minimum from 08:00 to 17:00 by air traffic controllers both in a control tower and an approach control. Due to its length and relative proximity to the JMTC training area, it makes for a realistic simulation of short field operations encountered around the world. Bunker Dropzone is also located within the Grafenwöhr Training Area. It is used to practice airdrop of troops, equipment, and supplies, primarily by the 173rd Mobile Brigade Combat Team (Airborne) and the 2nd Air Support Operations Squadron.

== Geography ==
The civilian town of Grafenwöhr rests nestled between low hills. The area is widely forested and the nearby region is mostly used for agricultural purposes. Farms and dairies cover much of the surrounding landscape. Grafenwöhr is positioned geographically such that it seen very mild summers and cold winters.

=== Climate ===
Climate in this area has mild differences between highs and lows, and there is adequate rainfall year-round. The Köppen Climate Classification subtype for this climate is "Cfb" (Marine West Coast Climate/Oceanic climate).

Climate data for Grafenwöhr
Month	Jan	Feb	Mar	Apr	May	Jun	Jul	Aug	Sep	Oct	Nov	Dec	Year
Mean daily maximum °C (°F)	1 (33)	3 (37)	7 (45)	12 (54)	18 (64)	21 (69)	23 (73)	22 (72)	18 (65)	13 (55)	6 (42)	2 (35)	12 (54)
Mean daily minimum °C (°F)	−6 (22)	−5 (23)	−2 (28)	1 (34)	6 (42)	8 (47)	10 (50)	10 (50)	7 (44)	3 (37)	−1 (31)	−4 (25)	2 (36)
Average precipitation mm (inches)	48 (1.9)	38 (1.5)	43 (1.7)	41 (1.6)	56 (2.2)	74 (2.9)	69 (2.7)	61 (2.4)	51 (2)	46 (1.8)	51 (2)	56 (2.2)	630 (24.9)
Average precipitation days	15	12	13	12	14	15	12	12	12	11	15	15	158
Source: Weatherbase

== Sports ==
- Soccer: SV Grafenwöhr. The adults and children mostly all are in either the Kreisliga or Bezirksoberliga.
- Fishing: The area around Grafenwöhr is excellent for fishing. There are many lakes on the training area and the surrounding area that are fished. Common fish landed in the area are Carp, Pike, Rainbow Trout, and Brown Trout.
- Hunting: The area around Grafenwöhr is heavily forested and provides for excellent hunting. Wild boar (Wildschwein), roe deer (Reh) and red deer (Rotwild) are the most commonly hunted animals.
- Other: The U.S. Military hosts a wide variety of sports within the boundaries of the camps.
- CrossFit: Grafenwöhr has an active CrossFit community that take part in local and regional competitions. Their best athletes compete at the national level.

== Transport ==
- Road: Grafenwöhr is located along Bundesstrasse B299. Civilian transportation to, from, in, and around Grafenwöhr is limited to the automobile. There are a limited number of taxi and bus services available.
- Rail: The only railroad in Grafenwöhr is strictly for military use and transport only. However, there are several rail stations nearby where civilian passenger trains run. The closest Bahnhofs (rail stations) are Pressath, Schwarzenbach, Freihung, and Vilseck.
- Air: The only airfield in Grafenwöhr is strictly for military use and transport only. The closest international airport is located in Nuremberg, approximately 90 kilometers away.

== VIPs and important visitors ==
- Prince Luitpold, (1821-1912), gave the approval to build the training area on December 9, 1906.
- Elvis Presley, (1935-1977), was on the military training place from November 3, 1958, for six weeks while he was doing his military service, then visited the base on four occasions, two in 1959, and two in 1960. His father stayed at the Micky Bar when visiting Elvis, whose private show for the bar's staff is claimed as his only concert outside North America.

== Media ==
American Forces Network (AFN) Bavaria broadcasts from the Grafenwöhr Training Area. Bavarian Times Magazine provides news, shopping, dining and other information about the Grafenwohr area. The Bavarian Times is a military magazine for the Grafenwöhr Training Area.

== Photo gallery ==
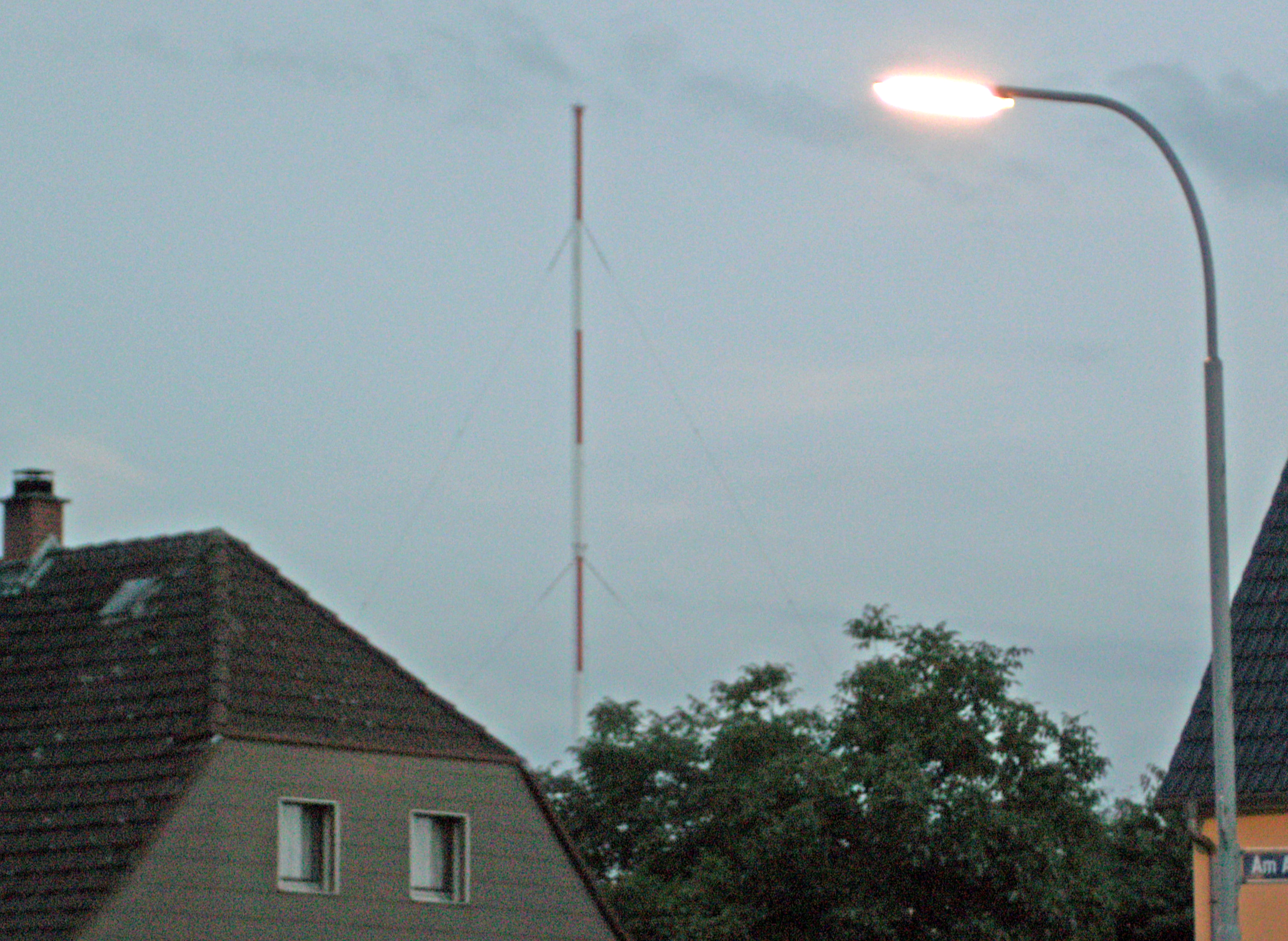
Grafenwöhr AFN FM radio mast

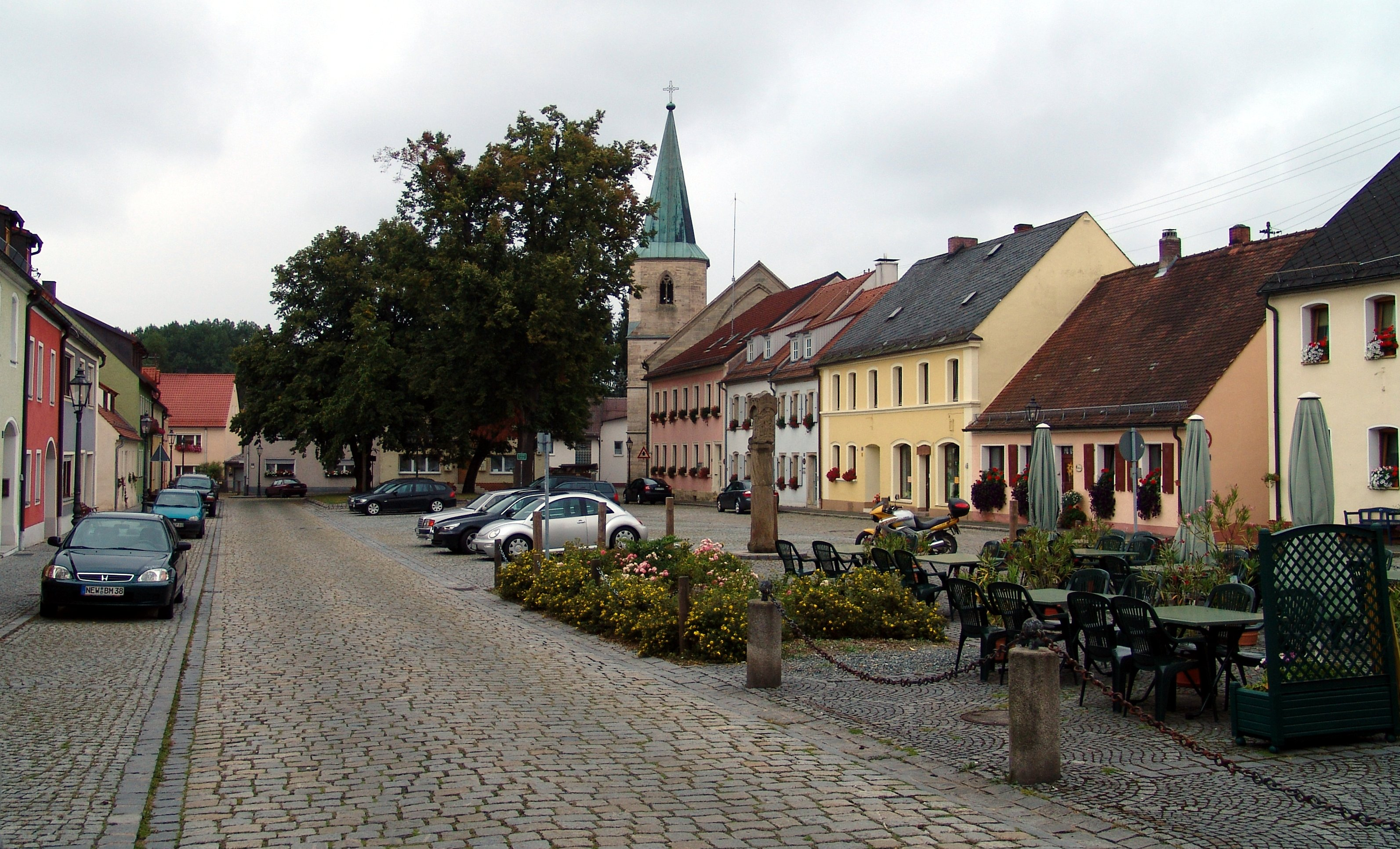
Grafenwöhr town center

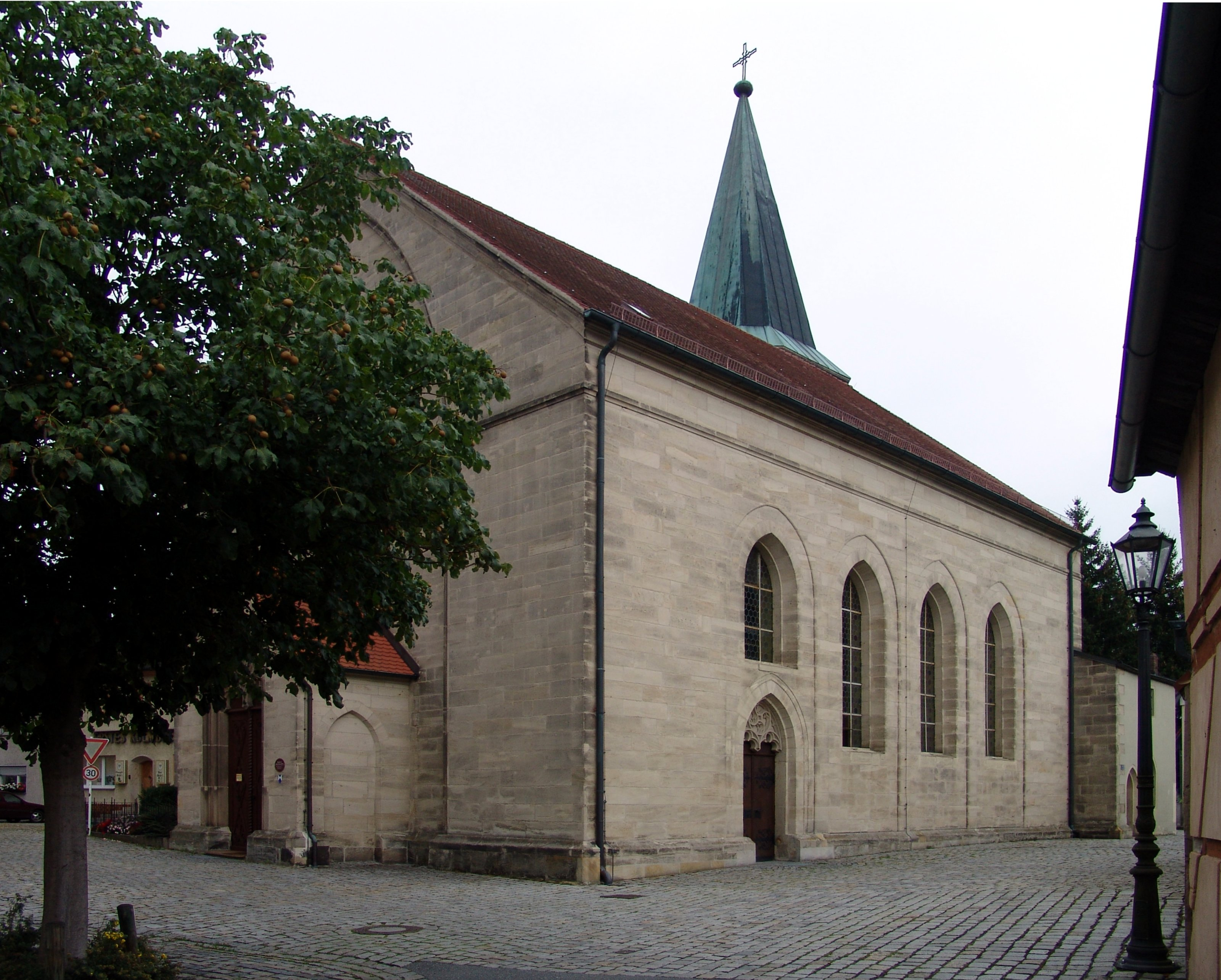
Church Pfarrkirche Mariä Himmelfahrt

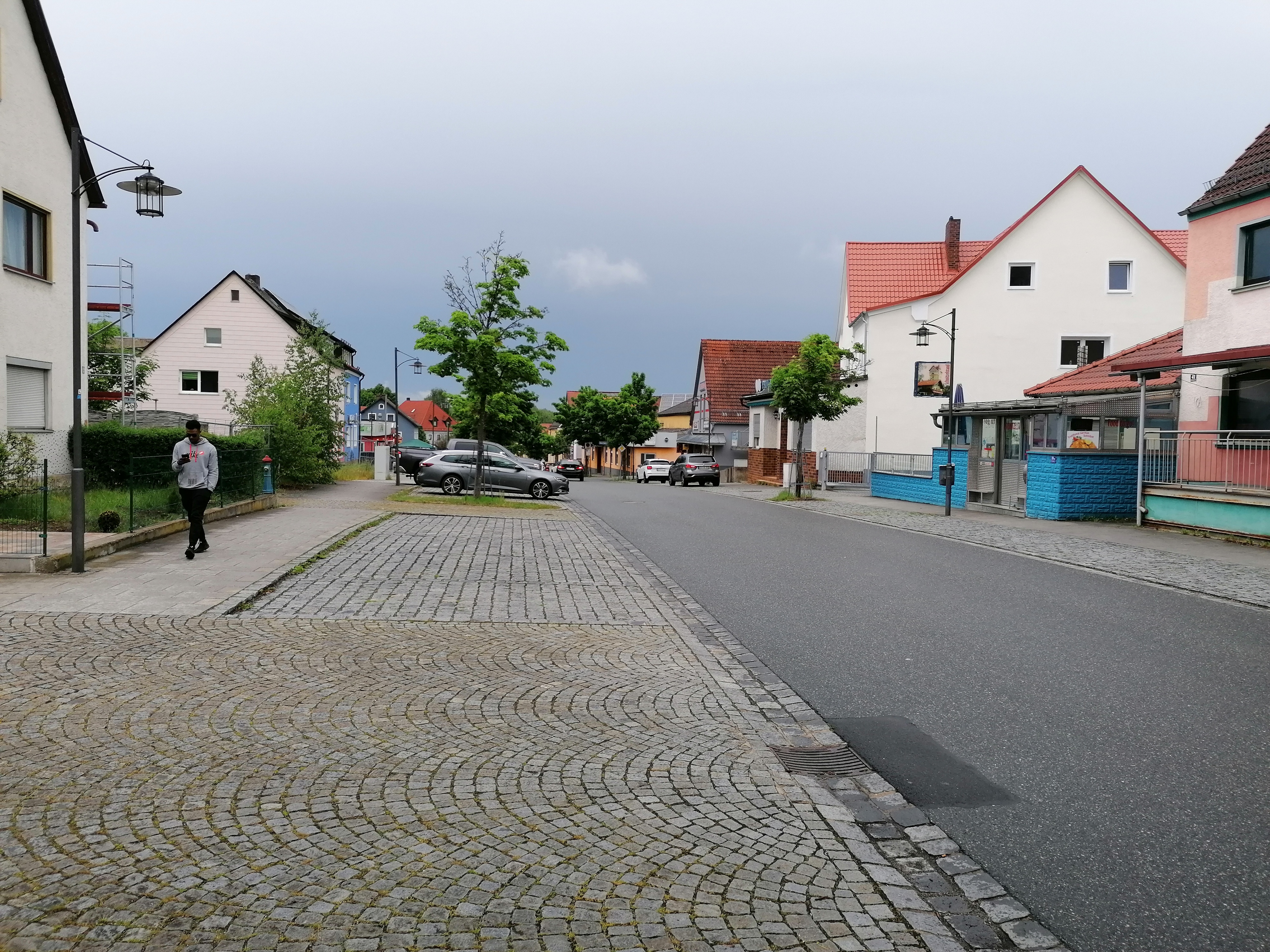
Alte Amberger Straße

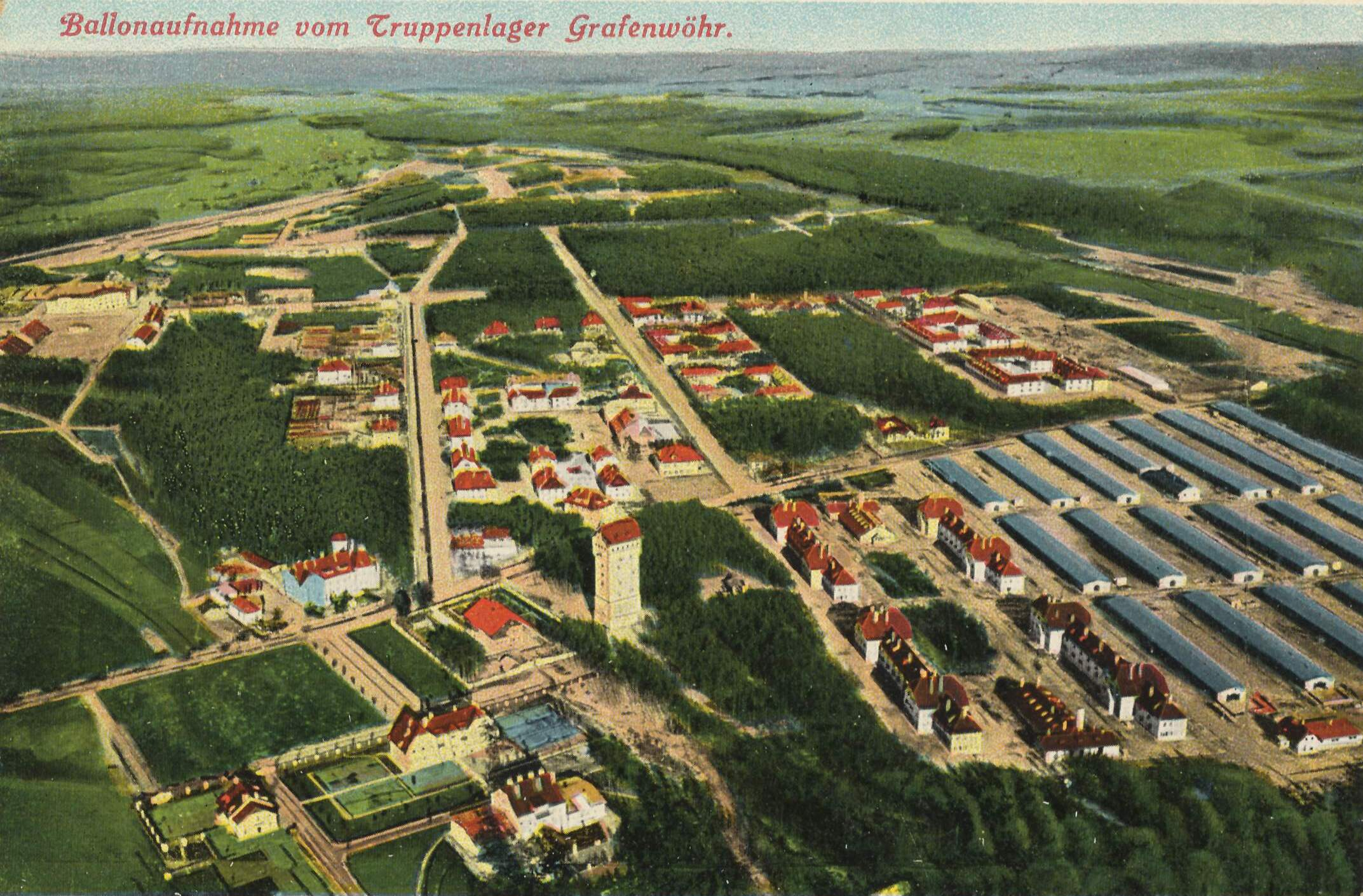
Training camp and area around 1911
