= Speinshart =

- Municipality
- Coat of arms

- Location of Speinshart within Neustadt a.d.Waldnaab district
- Interactive map of Speinshart
- Location within Germany Location within Bavaria
- Coordinates: 49°47′13″N 11°49′15″E
- Country: Germany
- State: Bavaria
- Admin. region: Oberpfalz
- District: Neustadt a.d.Waldnaab
- Municipal assoc.: Eschenbach in der Oberpfalz

Government
  - Mayor (2020–26): Albert Nickl (CSU)

Area
  - Total: 23.77 km^{2} (9.18 sq mi)
- Elevation: 425 m (1,394 ft)

Population (2025-12-31)
  - Total: 1,111
  - Density: 46.74/km^{2} (121.1/sq mi)
- Time zone: UTC+01:00 (CET)
  - Summer (DST): UTC+02:00 (CEST)
- Postal codes: 92676
- Dialling codes: 09645
- Vehicle registration: NEW
- Website: www.speinshart.de

Speinshart (German pronunciation: [ˈʃpaɪnshaʁt]) is a municipality in the district of Neustadt an der Waldnaab in Bavaria, Germany. The municipality gained its name from the monastery Speinshart which was built between 1692 and 1697 by Wolfgang Dientzenhofer.

== Mayor ==
Albert Nickl (* 1963) (CSU) is the mayor since 1996.

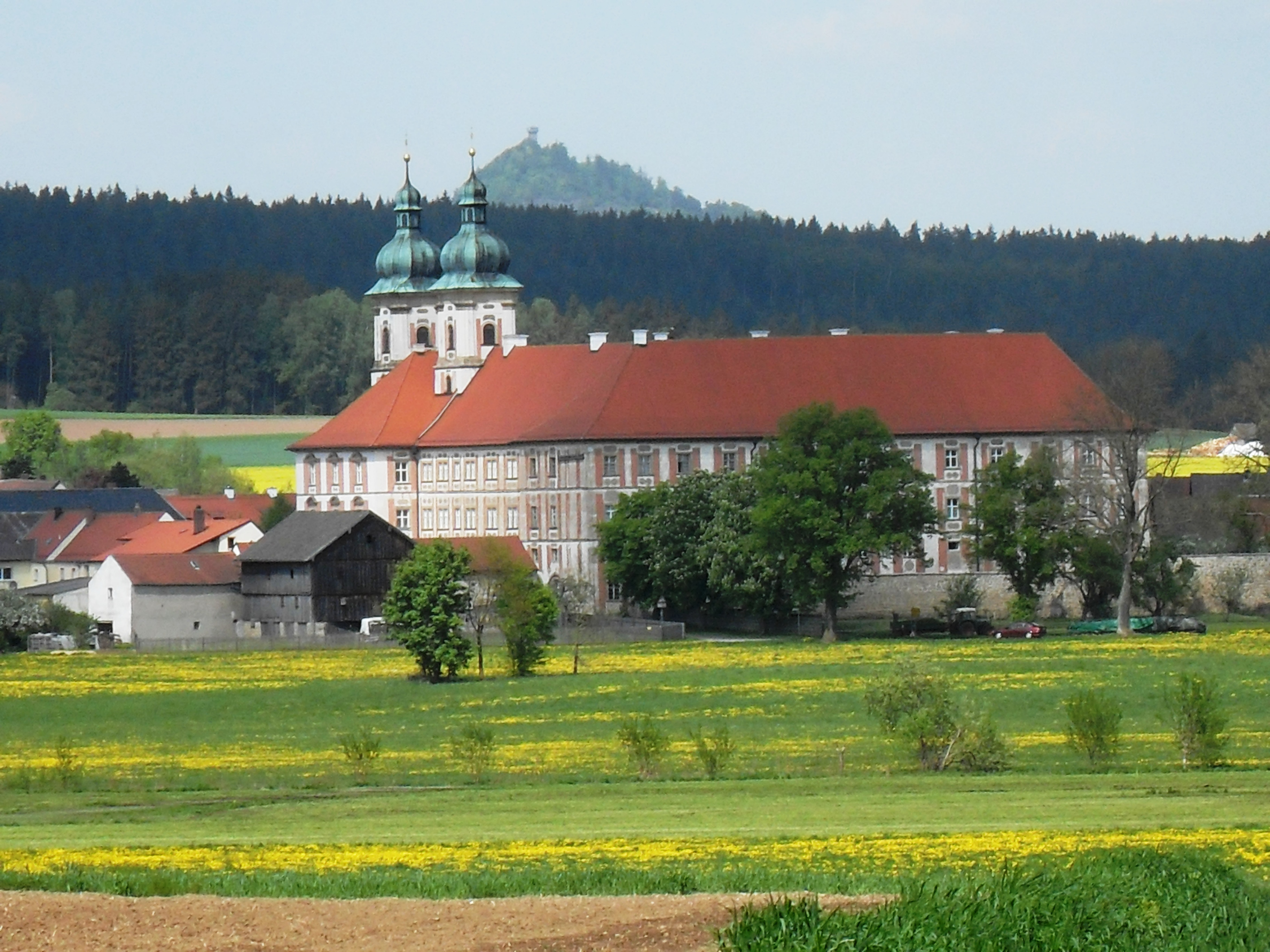
Looking from south to north at the Kloster Speinshart with the Rauher Kulm in the distance

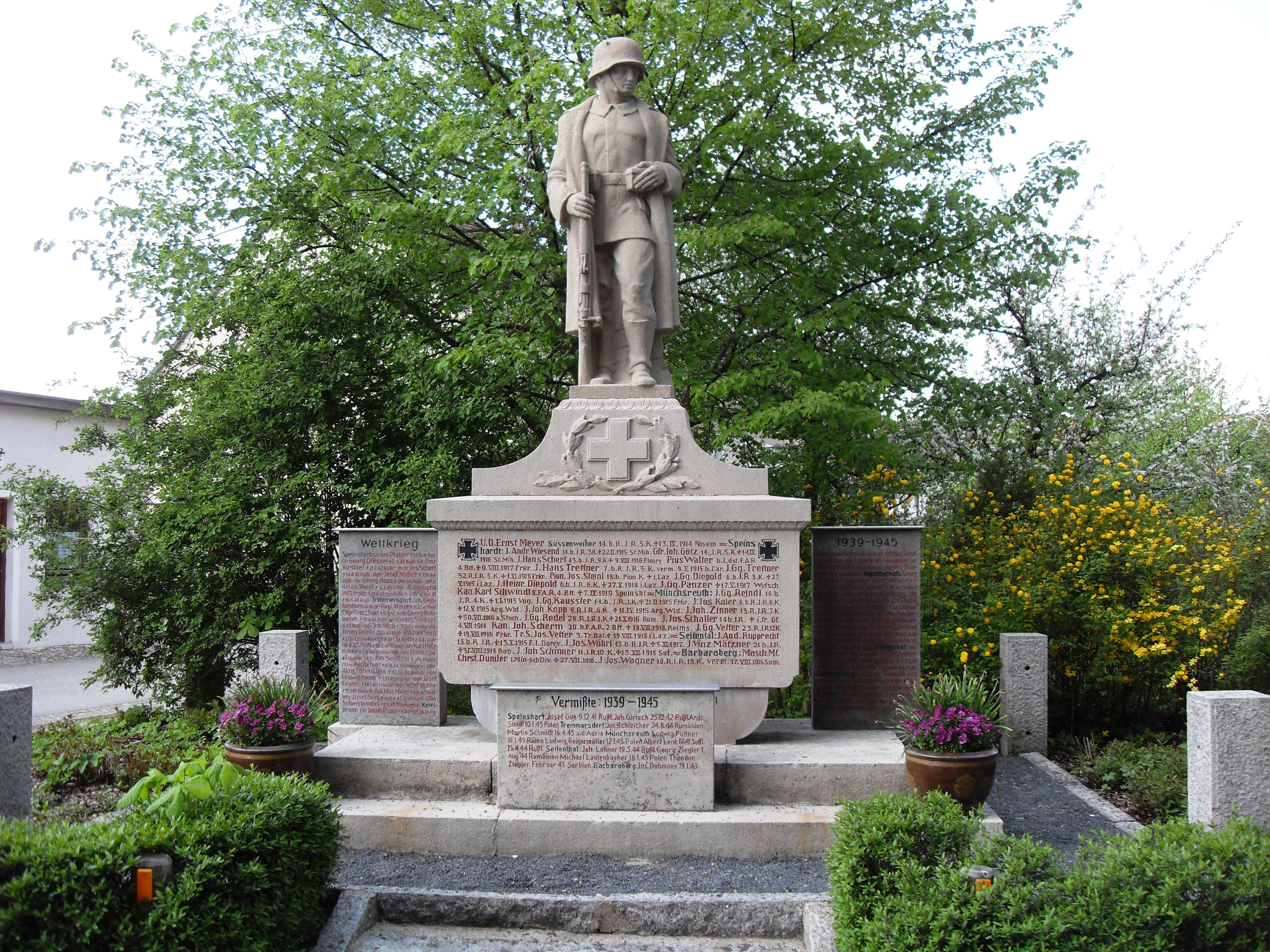
Memorial in Speinshart, Germany to fallen German Soldiers from the Speinshart area during World War I and World War II
