= ʻEneʻio Botanical Garden =

Plant collection in Tonga

Coordinates: 18.6414°S 173.9137°W

The ‘Ene’io Botanical Garden (EBG) is a botanical garden in Tonga and is the first of its kind there. It has the largest and most varied plant collection in the Kingdom of Tonga.

It consists of 22 acres (89,000 m^{2}) of privately owned gardens and was developed in 1972 by Haniteli Fa’anunu, retired Minister of Agriculture and Fisheries. As an agronomist with 38 years of agricultural experience (18 as the Director of Agriculture and Food within the Tongan government), Fa’anunu offers visitors a personalized tour through gardens containing over 100 plant families and 500 plant species, both native and exotic. The garden also has ocean access at ‘Ene’io Beach, a private beach with a camping area.

The garden opened to the public in 2006, and also acts as an unofficial bird sanctuary.
