= Sonatel =

Telecommunications provider in Senegal

Société Nationale des Télécommunications du Senegal
- Trade name: Sonatel Group
- Industry: Telecommunications
- Founded: 1985; 41 years ago
- Headquarters: Dakar, Senegal
- Owner: Orange S.A. (42.33%)
- Website: sonatel.sn

Sonatel (Société Nationale des Télécommunications du Senegal) is the principal telecommunications provider of Senegal. The company was created by Djibo Leyti Ka, when he was Ministry of Telecommunications in 1985 to provide Senegal with its own telecommunications industry, with Ndaly Ndiaye. The company is active in fixed line telephony, mobile telephony, internet service, television and corporate telecommunications. The company is involved in the construction of fiber optics networks in Africa and manages 2,200 kilometers of fiber cable in Senegal.

The headquarters of the company are located in Dakar, the capital of Senegal. Orange S.A. owns a 42.33% controlling stake in Sonatel, which is listed on the Bourse Régionale des Valeurs Mobilières (BRVM).

The company is the second mobile phone service provider in Bamako, Mali, and has 1,000,000 mobile phone customers in that country.

The company is involved in the construction of fiber optics networks in Africa and manages 2,200 kilometers fiber cable in Senegal. Among the other countries it provides network for are as follows: Democratic Republic of Congo, Egypt, Guinea, Guinea-Bissau, Luxembourg, Madagascar, Côte d'Ivoire, Mali and Moldova.

In January 2012, it started providing a 12-channel mobile television service.
