= Ecobank Ghana =

Ghanaian commercial bank

Ecobank Ghana PLC
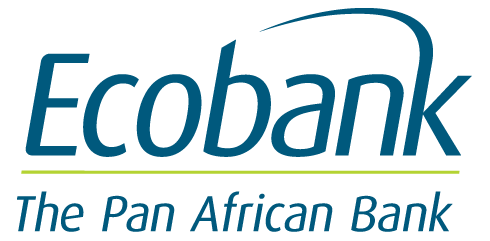

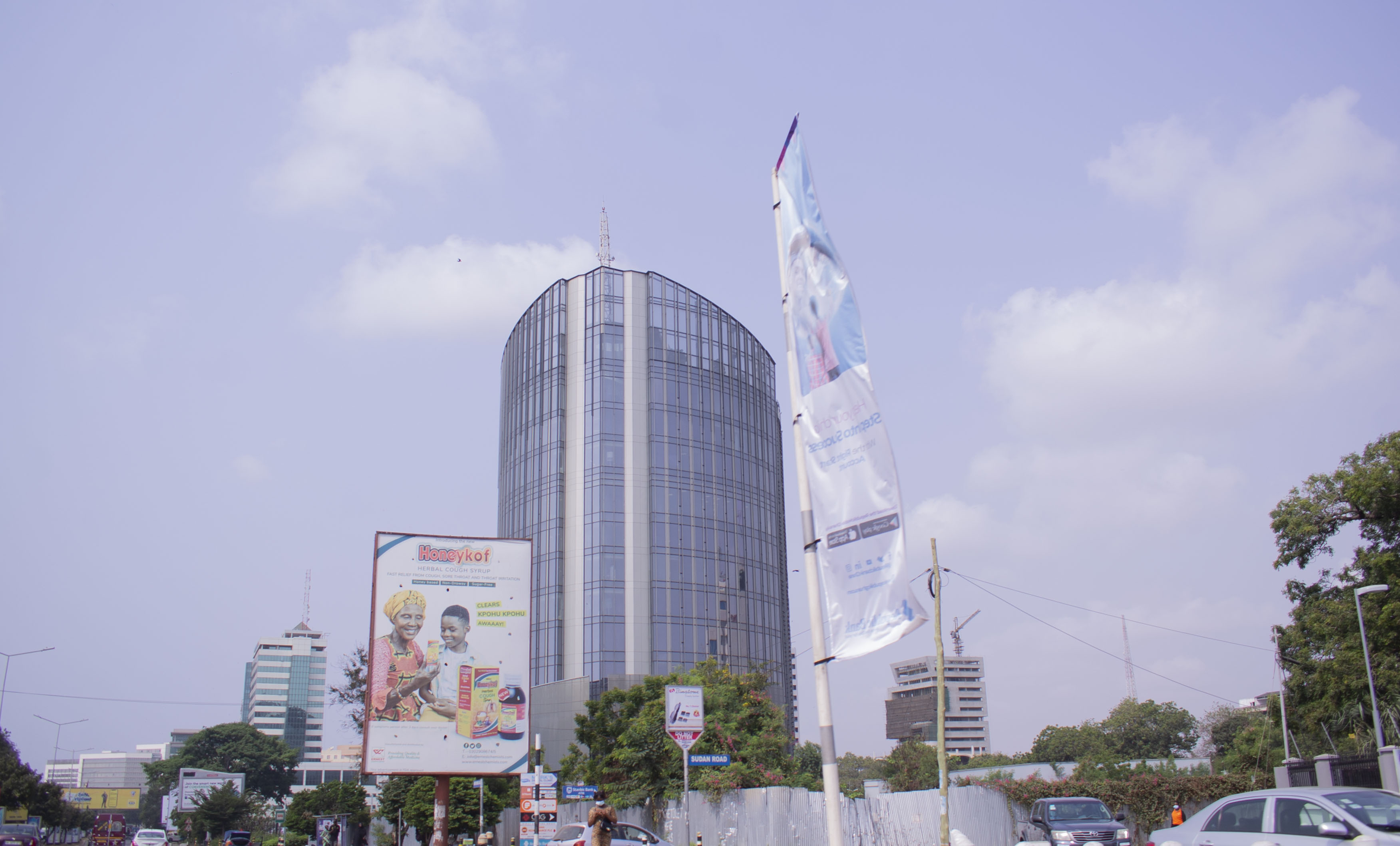
- Ecobank Ghana head office
- Company type: Public limited company
- Traded as: GSE: EGH
- Industry: Financial services
- Founded: 1990
- Headquarters: Accra, Greater Accra, Ghana
- Key people: Mr. Samuel Ashitey Adjei (Chairman); Abena Osei-Poku (Managing Director)
- Products: Loans, savings, investments, debit cards, credit cards, mortgages
- Revenue: US$3.4 billion (2022)
- Total assets: Assets|▲GH¢ 25.90 billion (2022)▲GH¢ 17.92 billion (2021)▲GH¢ 15.95 billion (2020)
- Number of employees: 1,617
- Website: Homepage

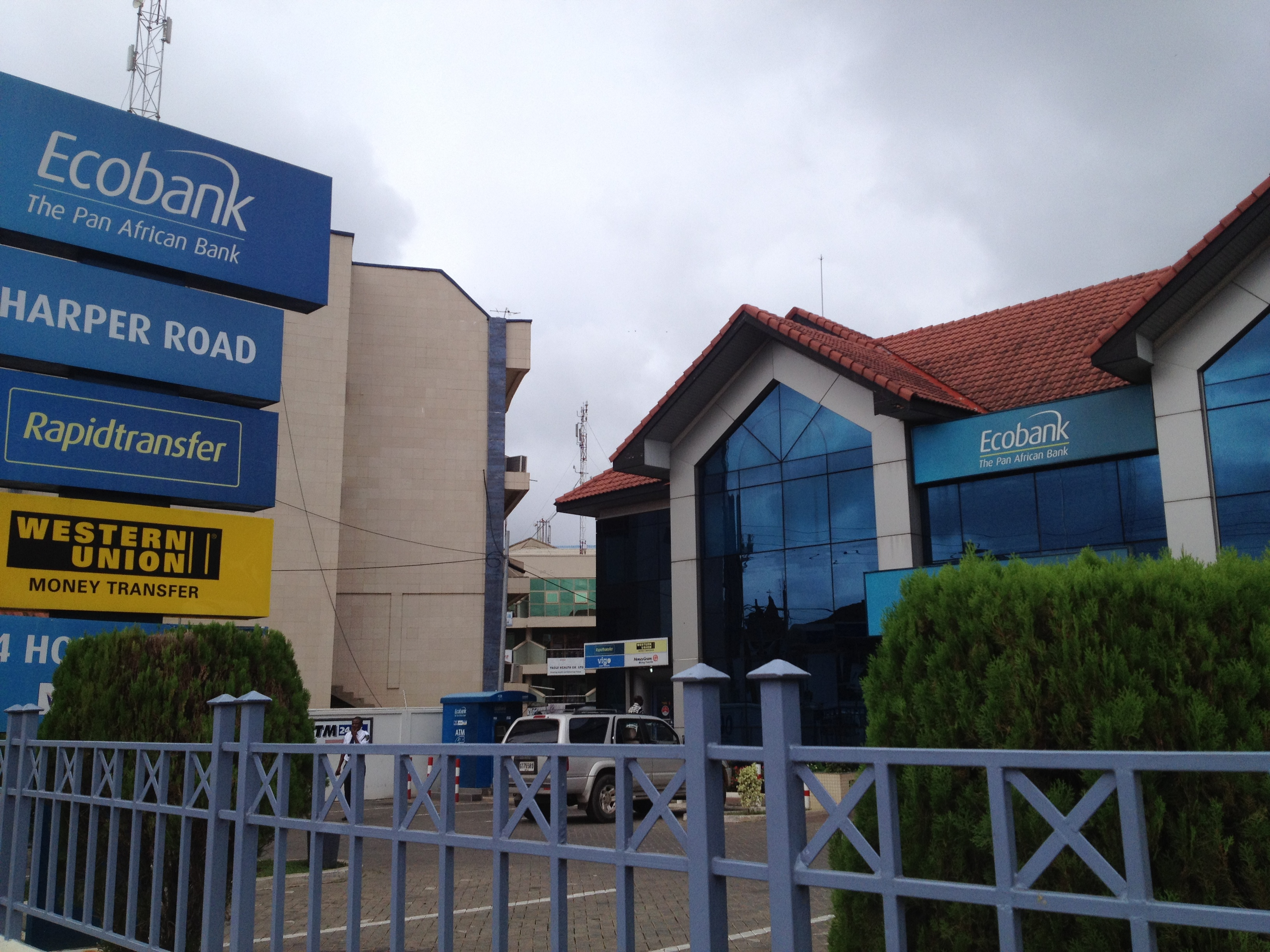
Ecobank in Kumasi

Ecobank Ghana PLC is a commercial bank in Ghana. It is one of the commercial banks licensed by the Bank of Ghana, the national banking regulator. In 2022, the bank retained its position as the largest bank in Ghana in the 2023 Ghana Banking Survey by PricewaterhouseCoopers (PwC). LIMA Partners also named the bank as the biggest bank by total assets in the Ghana Banking Industry Report.

== Overview ==
EBG is a member of the Pan-African Ecobank chain which operates in 32 countries. The stock of Ecobank Ghana is listed on the Ghana Stock Exchange, where its shares are traded under the symbol EGH. The bank is a fully networked commercial bank in Ghana with branches (total of 77 as of December 2016) in almost all regions of the nation. In 2023, the bank introduced two products (asset finance and working capital stream) to help shippers' liquidity challenges.

== History ==
Ecobank Ghana was incorporated on January 9, 1989, as a private limited liability company under the Organizations Code to engage in the business of banking.

The bank was formed on February 19, 1990. In December 2011, Bank of Ghana, the central bank of the country, which also functions as the national banking regulator, gave approval for Ecobank Transnational to acquire 100% interest in The Trust Bank (TTB), another licensed commercial bank. At the time, the total asset valuation of TTB was approximately US$119 million (GH¢ 220 million). Ecobank has successfully merged TTB and EBG. The new bank is known as Ecobank Ghana Limited.

== Operations ==
Ecobank Ghana PLC has a board of directors and an Executive Management team for the running of the West African subsidiary bank in Ghana. The bank's activities are largely organized around three key areas in the banking sector: consumer/retail banking, commercial/business banking and asset management and investment banking.

=== Consumer/retail banking ===
Consumer and retail banking consists of personal banking and other specialized services for clients in premier, advantage, classic and direct categories of customers.

=== Commercial banking ===
In commercial banking, Ecobank Ghana PLC focuses on business banking for large, medium and small scale companies in the country across all industries and sectors and corporate banking for public sector institutions, multinationals, financial institutions and international organizations.

=== Asset management and investment banking ===
The bank's asset management and investment banking activity focuses on wealth management, cash and liquidity management, supply chain solutions, fixed income trading, currencies and commodities and custody business.

== Management ==
The board of directors has eight members, including a chair and company secretary:

1. Mr. Samuel Ashitey Adjei – Chairman
2. Mr. Daniel Nii Kwei Kumah Sackey – managing director
3. Dr. Edward Nartey Botchway – Executive Director
4. Mrs. Patience Enyonam Akyianu – non-executive director
5. Mr. Henry Dodoo-Amoo – non-executive director
6. Dr. John Ofori-Tenkorang – non-executive director
7. Dr. Ohene Aku-Kwapong – non-executive director
8. Mrs. Awura Abena Asafo-Boakye – company secretary

The Executive Management team consists of the managing director, executive director and ten heads of portfolios:;

1. Mr. Daniel Nii Kwei Kumah Sackey – managing director, Ecobank Ghana & Regional Executive, Anglophone West Africa Cluster.
2. Dr. Edward Nartey Botchway – Executive Director & Head, Consumer Banking
3. Mrs. Awura Abena Asafo-Boakye – company secretary & Head, Legal
4. Patrick Bleboo – Head, Operations & Information Technology
5. Joana Mensah – Head, Risk Management
6. Isaac Baah – Business Manager
7. Albert Bartlett-Mingle – Head, Internal Control
8. Philip Baabereyir Bertino – Head, Internal Audit
9. Charlotte Amanquah – Head, Commercial Banking
10. Newlove Kwame Adjei – Head, Finance
11. Rolland Djang – Head, Compliance
12. Nixon Amoah-Awuah – Head, Human Resources

== Awards ==
- SDG Financial Service Award 2023
- Africa's Best Bank for Small and Medium-sized Enterprises (SMEs) 2022
- CIMG Elite Category Hall of Fame (Under 10 Years) – 2019
- Investor of the Year 2012
- The Bank of the Year 2012
- Africa Investor of the Year 2011
- EMEA Finance of the Year 2011
- Trade Finance of the Year 2011

== See also ==
- Ecobank
- Ecobank Nigeria
- Ecobank Uganda
- Ecobank Zimbabwe
- List of banks in Ghana
- Jeremy Awori leads ecobank Group as new chief executive officer.
