= Jeremy Awori =

Kenyan businessman and corporate executive

- Born: 1970 (age 55–56); Kenya
- Education: University of Manchester; McGill University
- Occupations: Businessman and corporate executive
- Years active: 1999–present
- Title: Chief executive officer and managing director of Ecobank Group

Jeremy Awori is a Kenyan businessman who serves as the Group CEO of Ecobank Transnational.

Previously, Awori served as the managing director and chief executive officer of Absa Bank Kenya (formerly Barclays Bank of Kenya), since June 2013. Before that, from 2008 until 2013, he was the CEO of Standard Chartered Tanzania.

== Background and education ==
Awori is a Kenyan national, born in 1970. His father was an engineer and a Kenyan by birth. His mother was British and a lawyer. He has two siblings, one brother and one sister.

He was educated at St. Mary's School, Nairobi, for his elementary and secondary education. In 1989, he was admitted to the University of Manchester in the United Kingdom, graduating in 1991 with a Bachelor of Science degree in Pharmacy. Later in the 1990s, he graduated from McGill University, in Canada with a Master of Business Administration degree, focusing on finance and international business.

== Career ==
After his first degree, Awori practiced as a pharmacist in the United Kingdom, before he moved to Canada for his second degree.

After earning his MBA, he was hired by Standard Chartered Bank, Kenya. His employer was impressed by the work he did there, leading to Awori being hired as the "head of Retail Banking, Standard Chartered Bank Kenya, at the age of 28 years". He concurrently served on the board of Standard Chartered Kenya at that time.

From there, he was transferred to the United Arab Emirates as the head of consumer banking at Standard Chartered United Arab Emirates. After three years in that position, he was promoted to regional sales director, Middle East, South Asia and Africa, based in the United Arab Emirates, serving in that role for two years. In 2008, he was appointed CEO and managing director of Standard Chartered Tanzania, serving there for five years.

In 2013, he left Standard Chartered and transferred to Barclays Bank, taking up a new appointment as CEO of Barclays Bank Kenya (BBK). In 2020, BBK, whose shares are listed on the Nairobi Stock Exchange, rebranded to Absa Bank Kenya, with Awori at the helm.

He retired from Absa Bank Kenya on 31 October 2022 and took up a new position at Ecobank Transnational as director and Group CEO, based in Lome, Togo.
