= BRVM =

West African stock exchange in Abidjan, Côte d'Ivoire

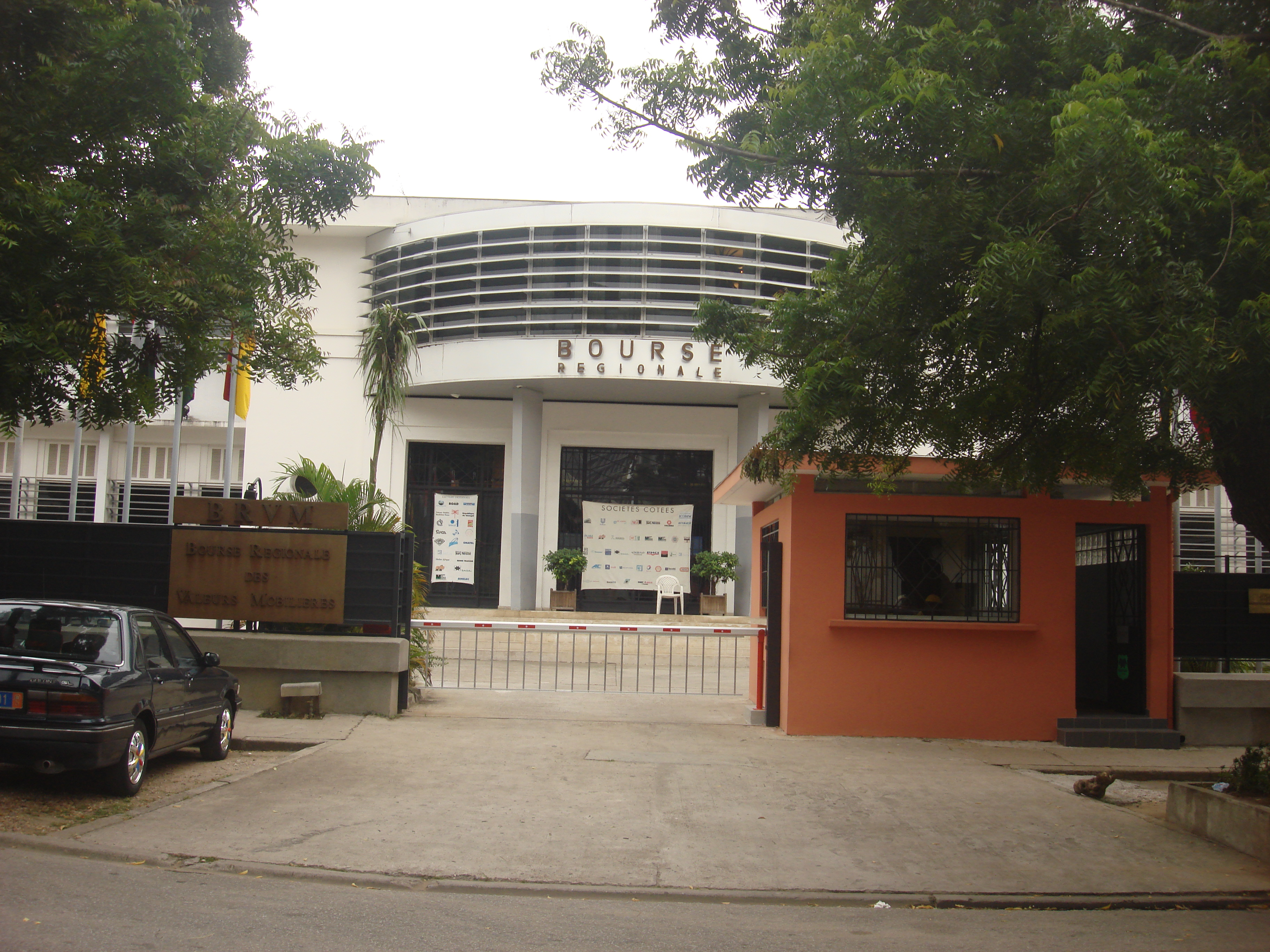
- Location: Abidjan, Ivory Coast
- Key people: Edoh Kossi Amenounve (CEO)
- No. of listings: 45
- Website: www.brvm.org

The Bourse Régionale des Valeurs Mobilières SA ("Regional Securities Exchange SA"), or BRVM, is a regional stock exchange serving the following West African countries:

- Benin
- Burkina Faso
- Côte d'Ivoire
- Guinea Bissau
- Mali
- Niger
- Senegal
- Togo.

The exchange is located in Abidjan, Cote d'Ivoire. Market offices are maintained in each country.

BRVM is a private corporation with 2,904,300,000 CFA francs in capital.

The BRVM Composite Index climbed 18 percent in 2015.

== Mission ==
The mission of the BRVM is to:

- organize the securities market;
- disseminate market information;
- promote the market.

== History ==
Time line Market integration by the BRVM is a political, institutional, and technical success. The Bourse Régionale and Dépositaire Central/Banque de Règlement (DC/BR) were established in several phases:

- November 14, 1973: Treaty signed establishing the West African Monetary Union (WAMU), which created a financial market organized into sub-regions.
- December 17, 1993: WAMU Council of Ministers decides to create a Regional Financial Market and mandates the Central Bank of West African States (BCEAO) to conduct the project.
- December 18, 1996: Various preliminary activities are conducted resulting in the formation in Cotonou of Bourse Régionale des Valeurs Mobilières S.A. (BRVM) and Dépositaire Central/Banque de Règlement S.A. (DC/BR), thus marking the end of the BCEAO mandate and the takeover of project management by its own agencies.
- November 20, 1997: Union's Council of Ministers establishes the Regional Council for Public Saving and Financial Markets.
- September 16, 1998: BRVM and DC/BR begin operations.

== Operations ==
The BRVM is entirely electronic. The central site in Abidjan provides securities quotation and trading services as well as regulation/issuing services.

Agents sitting at workstations in their offices or desks located in national branch offices in WAEMU countries and brokerage firms can:

- enter orders for securities and send them to the central site via the satellite network;
- consult and edit quotation results;
- consult statistical information on the BRVM and Dépositaire Central;
- distribute information.

The principles followed in establishing the BRVM satisfy the requirement for both compliance with international standards and adaptability to the WAEMU socioeconomic environment. Equal access to information and the management of investors and network access costs, regardless of the economic operator's location, are key drivers. The exchange can be described as follows:

A centralized exchange driven by orders, that is, the price of a security is fixed by matching bid and ask orders collected before the quotation.

Three weekly trading sessions with two fixings (single price obtained by matching bid with ask orders). These sessions will evolve rapidly towards daily sessions to implement:

- real-time quotation sessions;
- a spot market with a sliding transaction closing date so operators know exactly when they will have to meet their commitments. At the start, the BRVM closed transactions on D+5 (trading day plus five business days) but this must move towards current international standards, that is, closing on D+3;
- guaranteed transactions, thanks to the establishment of a market guarantee fund supported by brokerage firms to mitigate an eventual default;
- holding and centralization of securities by a central clearing house and their exclusive circulation in a dematerialized form.

== Listing ==
Eligibility The BRVM has, at inception, two sections for stocks and a single section for bond loans.

To be eligible for the first section, a company must satisfy the following conditions:

- demonstrate market capitalization equal to or higher than 500 million CFA francs;
- have a net revenue margin of 3% in each of the past three years;
- demonstrate five years of certified statements;
- agree to sign a market activation contract;
- distribute to the public at least 20% of its capital as soon as it joins the exchange;
- agree to publish semi-annual revenue estimates and results trends.

Eligibility of a company for the second section is subject to the following conditions:

- demonstrate market capitalization equal to or higher than 200 million CFA francs;
- demonstrate two years of certified accounts;
- agree to sign a market activation contract;
- agree to distribute to the public at least 20% of its capital within two years, or 15% in the event of a share capital increase.

The mandatory section-debt instruments-is accessible to bond loans, of which the total number of securities issued is higher than 25,000 and has a face value of at least 500,000,000 CFA francs.

Listing Getting listed on the BRVM is the final link in the financing chain for businesses. It is a strategic long-term decision that requires excellent preparation. A company seeking to be listed on the BRVM must satisfy the following conditions:

- be incorporated;
- sign a written agreement to distribute the information required by the exchange, especially the publication of annual statements in the official newsletter (Bulletin Officiel de la Cote) and participation in organization of the exchange;
- sign a written agreement to obey the rules and regulations of the BRVM.

To apply for listing on the BRVM, the candidate company must mandate a brokerage firm to assist and advise it. Once the complete application has been received, the BRVM will rule on the company's eligibility and send a copy of the application to the Regional Council of Public Saving and Financial Markets for the necessary notification. The listed company has the following responsibilities:

- manage the regulatory framework and relations with investors;
- organize annual shareholders meetings, etc.;
- inform the exchange and the public of any new fact or modification that might significantly influence the prices of its securities.

NB: For further information, please contact the BRVM, its national branch offices or a brokerage firm.

== BRVM Indices ==
Two BRVM market indices represent the activities of stock market shares.

The BRVM Composite comprises all securities listed on the exchange.

The BRVM 10 comprises ten of the most active companies on the exchange (dated as of August 3, 2016).

=== Composition ===
Ticker symbol	Security	GICS Sector	Country	Market capitalization [Bn FCFA]	Freeflow market cap [Bn FCFA]
ETIT	Ecobank	Financials	Togo	487	83.2
SNTS	Sonatel	Telecommunications Services	Senegal	2280	512.3
ONTBF	Onatel	Telecommunications Services	Burkina Faso	442	90.2
UNXC	UNIWAX	Consumer Discretionary	Ivory Coast	99	17.4
SGBC	Société Générale CI	Financials	Ivory Coast	407	73.7
PALC	PALM CI	Consumer Staples	Ivory Coast	88	29.0
CIEC	Compagnie Ivoirienne d'Electricité	Utilities	Ivory Coast	209	40.1
TTLC	Total CI	Energy	Ivory Coast	214	53.5
FTSC	Filtisac	Industrials	Ivory Coast	104	28.6
BOAC	Bank of Africa CI	Financials	Ivory Coast	132	36.3

Formulation and selection criteria for the BRVM Composite and BRVM 10 are based on the leading global market indexes, especially the FCG index of the International Finance Corporation; a World Bank affiliate. The formula for the indexes takes into account market capitalization, transaction volume per session and transaction frequency. Only common shares are used to calculate the indexes.

The concept of liquidity also plays a key role in selecting securities for the BRVM 10. For each one, the average daily transaction volume in the three months preceding the quarterly review must not be less than the median daily transaction volume for all securities. Transaction frequency must always be higher than 50%, and the security must be traded at least one out of two times during the three-month study period.

The indexes are automatically generated by the BRVM trading system and circulated after every trading session. The BRVM 10 is also reviewed four times a year (first Monday of January, April, July and October), and the BRVM Composite after every new listing so it can keep pace with the growth of the Regional Financial Exchange.

== Market information ==
Information concerning the Bourse Régionale des Valeurs Mobilières (prices, volumes, dividend payments, financial statements of listed companies, etc.) is available via many channels, such as:

- the official newsletter (Bulletin Officiel de la Côte - BOC) available at the end of every trading session at the BRVM head office, national branch offices and from brokerage firms;
- the Quarterly Review available at the end of every quarter at the BRVM head office, national branch offices and from brokerage firms;
- information resellers with which the BRVM has signed partnership agreements, such as Reuters, and others to be announced;
- various private Web sites that distribute market information on their own initiative.

== See also ==
- BRVM Composite
- Economy of Africa
- Economy of West Africa
- List of African stock exchanges
- List of stock exchanges
- West African Economic and Monetary Union
