= Ecobank Zimbabwe =

Commercial bank in Zimbabwe

- Type: Subsidiary
- Industry: Financial services
- Founded: 2002
- Headquarters: Harare, Zimbabwe
- Key people: Fortune Chisango (chairman), Moses Kurenjekwa (managing director & CEO)
- Products: Loans, transaction accounts, savings, investments, debit cards
- Revenue: ▲ Aftertax:US$1.2 million (H1:2013)
- Total assets: US$120.2 million (June 2013)
- Parent: Ecobank
- Website: www.ecobank.com

Ecobank Zimbabwe Limited (EZW) is a commercial bank in Zimbabwe. It is one of the commercial banks licensed by the Reserve Bank of Zimbabwe and a subsidiary of Togo-based Ecobank.

Ecobank Zimbabwe is a small financial services provider, serving large corporate clients, upscale retail customers and medium to large business enterprises. Its services include personal banking, business banking, global banking and agricultural finance. As of June 2013, the bank's shareholders' equity was estimated at US$42.8 million, and total assets were valued at US$120.2 million.

== History ==
The bank was established in 2002 as Premier Finance Group, a merchant bank.

In January 2011, Ecobank Transnational acquired majority shareholding in Premier Finance Group, at US$10 million. Following the change in ownership, the institution rebranded to Ecobank Zimbabwe in May 2011. It also requested and was granted permission to change its merchant banking license to a commercial banking license. The Reserve Bank of Zimbabwe granted EBZ a commercial banking license, effective 15 May 2012.

== Ownership ==
Ecobank Zimbabwe is a subsidiary of Ecobank Transnational, the Pan African bank with headquarters in Lomé, Togo and a presence in over 30 African countries. Other shareholders in the Zimbabwean subsidiary are shown in the table below:

Ecobank Zimbabwe stock ownership
Rank	Name of owner	Percentage ownership
1	Ecobank Transnational	62.00
2	Consortium of Zimbabwean investors	38.00
	Total	100.00

== Branch network ==
As of June 2024, the bank maintains a network of 12 operational branches, at the following locations:

- Mutare Branch - 2A Fidelity Centre, Herbert Chitepo Street, Mutare
- Borrowdale Branch & Head Office - 4 Piers Road, Borrowdale, Harare
- Samora Machel Branch - 137 Samora Machel Avenue, Harare
- Msasa Branch - Shop 3, The Colonnade, 70 Mutare Road, Msasa, Harare
- Southerton Branch - Highfield Junction, Corner Paisley Rd/Highfield Rd, Southerton, Harare
- Graniteside Branch - 106 Seke Road, Graniteside, Harare
- Nelson Mandela Branch - 35 Nelson Mandela Avenue, Harare
- Bindura Branch - 57 Robert Mugabe Street, Mutare
- Kwekwe Branch - 61 Calvados Building, Robert Mugabe Way, Kwekwe
- Gweru Branch - 6th Street, Gweru
- Bradfield Branch - Stand 16433, Shops 3&4, Zonkizizwe Shopping Centre, Hillside Road, Bradfield, Bulawayo
- Parkade Centre Branch - 5 Parkade Centre, Fife Street at 9th Avenue, Bulawayo

== See also ==
- List of banks in Zimbabwe
- Economy of Zimbabwe
