= Ecobank Group =

Pan-African banking conglomerate

Ecobank Transnational Inc.
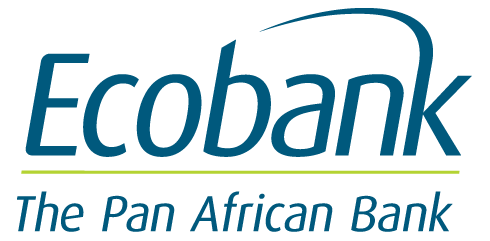

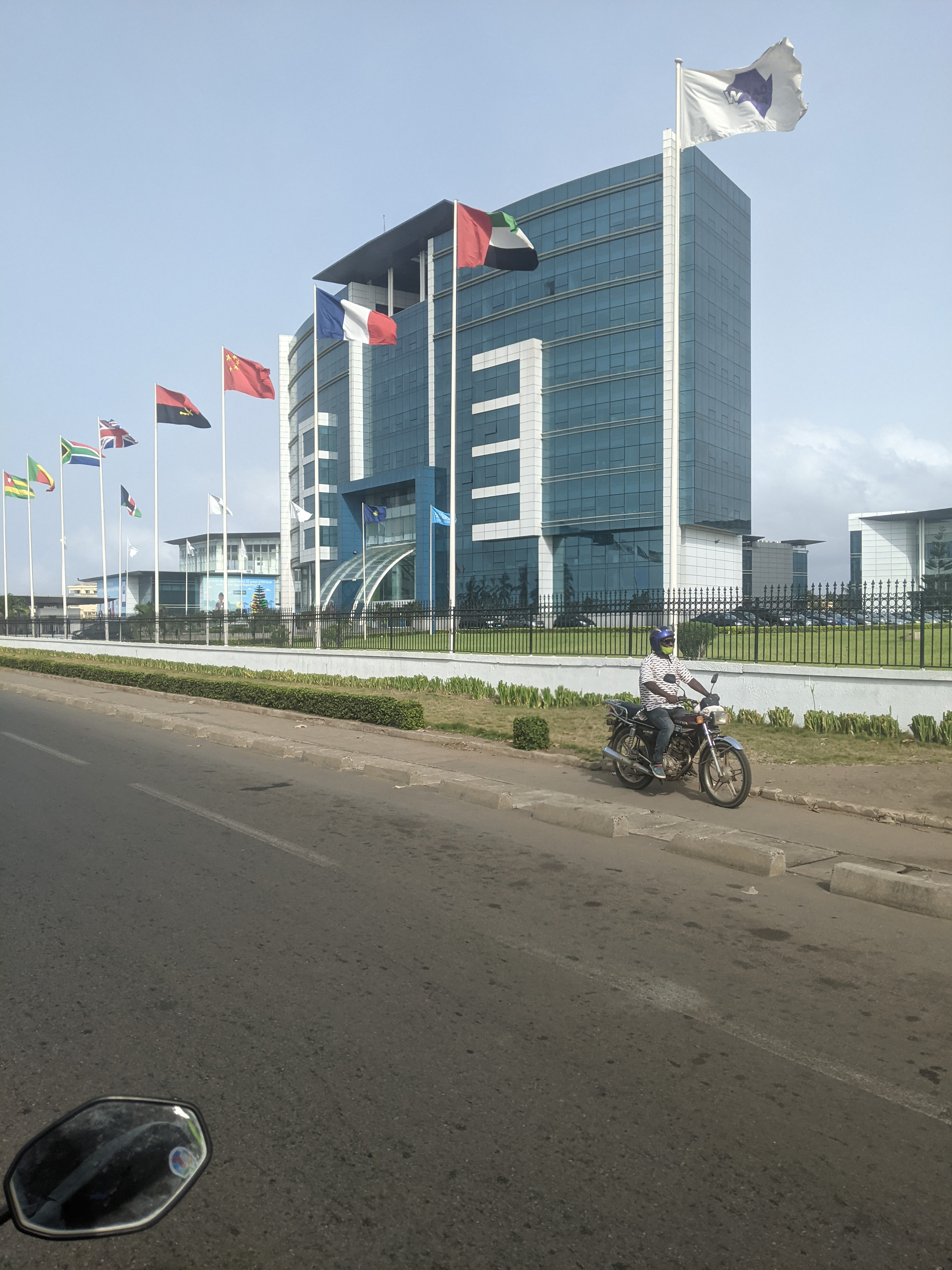
- Headquarters in Lomé
- Type: Public Company
- Traded as: BRVM: ETIT
- Industry: Financial services
- Founded: 1985
- Headquarters: 2365, Boulevard du Mono, B.P.3261, Lomé, Togo
- Key people: Papa Madiaw Ndiaye; Chairman; Jeremy Awori; Group Chief Executive officer
- Products: List: Banking Services, Investments, funds transfers, products and services including pan-African lending, trade services, cash management, internet banking, value-chain finance, treasury services, corporate finance, investment banking and securities and asset management
- Revenue: ▲US$ 2.06 billion (2023); US$ 1.86 billion (2022)
- Net income: ▲US$ 406 million (2023); US$ 366 million (2022)
- Total assets: ▼US$ 27.2 billion (2023); US$ 29 billion (2022)
- Total equity: ▼US$ 1.73 billion (2023); US$ 2.02 billion (2022)
- Number of employees: 13,000 (2022)
- Website: ecobank.com/group

Ecobank, whose official name is Ecobank Transnational Inc. (ETI), is a pan-African banking conglomerate, with banking operations in 33 African countries. It is the leading independent regional banking group in West Africa and Central Africa, serving wholesale and retail customers. It also maintains subsidiaries in Eastern and Southern Africa. ETI has an affiliate in France, and representative offices in China, Dubai, South Africa, and the United Kingdom.

== History ==
Ecobank was founded in 1985 to address the financial needs of West African entrepreneurs. The initiative originated from the Federation of West African Chambers of Commerce, aiming to establish a private regional banking institution. Key figures Gervais Koffi Djondo and Adeyemi Lawson played a crucial role in realizing this vision, which was first discussed in Mali in 1972.

Ecobank Transnational Incorporated (ETI) was incorporated with an authorized capital of $100 million, with an initial paid-up capital of $32 million from over 1,500 investors across West Africa. The ECOWAS Fund for Cooperation, Compensation and Development became its largest shareholder, reinforcing its regional mission.

In 1985, ETI signed a Headquarters Agreement with the Government of Togo, granting it international organization status and the privileges to operate as a regional, non-resident financial institution.

ETI has two key subsidiaries:

- Ecobank Development Corporation (EDC) focuses on investment banking and advisory services across Ecobank's markets. It operates brokerage houses on all three West African stock exchanges and holds licenses for the Douala and Libreville exchanges in Central Africa.
- eProcess International manages the Group's IT operations, aiming to centralize middle and back-office functions to enhance efficiency, improve service quality, and reduce costs.

As of December 2012, ETI's customer base was estimated at 32 million. ETI's branch network numbered 1,305, with 1,981 networked ATMs.

== Group network ==
As of June 2014, Ecobank Transnational had banking operations in 36 African countries, with representative offices in Angola, Beijing, Dubai, Ethiopia, South Africa and the United Kingdom:

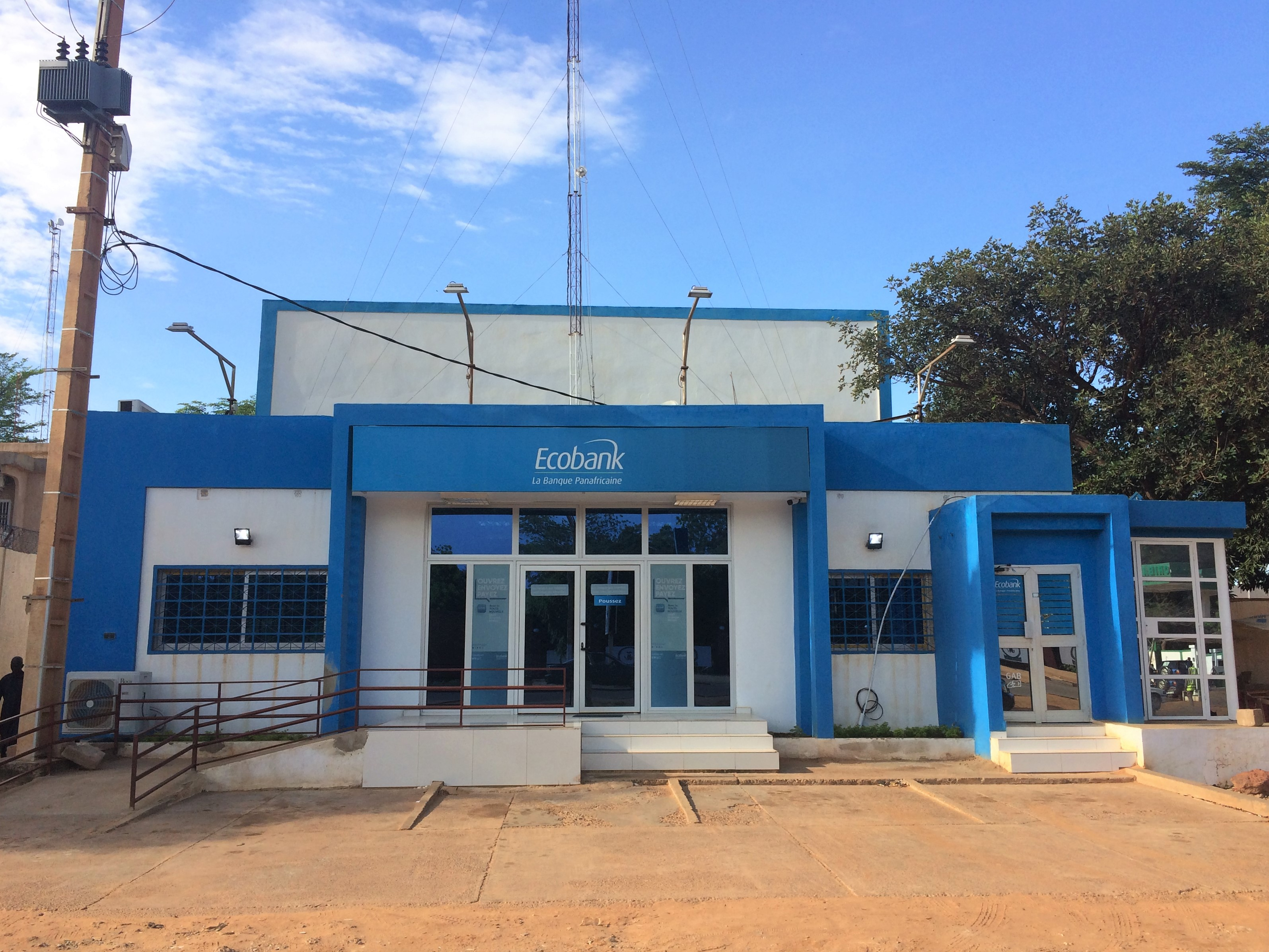
An Ecobank office in Niamey, Niger

Ecobank Transnational has operational bank subsidiaries in the following countries, as of July 2013:

=== Africa ===
- Ecobank Angola - (Representative office in Luanda)
- Ecobank Benin
- Ecobank Burkina Faso
- Ecobank Burundi
- Ecobank Cameroon
- Ecobank Cape Verde
- Ecobank Central African Republic
- Ecobank Chad
- Ecobank Congo Brazzaville
- Ecobank Democratic Republic of the Congo
- Ecobank Ethiopia - (Representative office in Addis Ababa)
- Ecobank Equatorial Guinea
- Ecobank Gabon
- Ecobank Gambia
- Ecobank Ghana
- Ecobank Guinea
- Ecobank Guinea-Bissau
- Ecobank Ivory Coast
- Ecobank Kenya
- Ecobank Liberia
- Ecobank Malawi
- Ecobank Mali
- Ecobank Mozambique
- Ecobank Niger
- Ecobank Nigeria (includes Oceanic Bank)
- Ecobank Rwanda
- Ecobank São Tomé and Príncipe
- Ecobank Senegal
- Ecobank Sierra Leone
- Ecobank South Africa (Representative office in Johannesburg)
- Ecobank South Sudan
- Ecobank Tanzania
- Ecobank Togo
- Ecobank Uganda
- Ecobank Zambia
- Ecobank Zimbabwe

=== Outside Africa ===
- Paris, France - Affiliate office
- London, United Kingdom - France affiliate representative office
- Dubai, United Arab Emirates - Representative office
- Beijing, China - Representative office

== Controversies ==
Ecobank has been marred by several well publicized governance lapses:

The sacking and reinstatement of the CFO in 2014 after she alleged: "... Mrs. Do Rego sent a letter to the SEC alleging that the Chairman, Mr. Lawson and GCEO Mr.Tanoh were attempting to sell non-core assets at values below market, that both individuals ‘attempted’ to manipulate the 2012 results to enable the Group (ETI) to show a much better 2013 growth, and she questioned procedures around the approval of a substantial increase in Mr.Tanoh’s 2012 bonus (which he subsequently opted not to receive). She also alleged that she was asked to write off debts owed by a real estate company Mr. Lawson chairs..."

The Chairman resigned but later sued Ecobank to force them to investigate the allegations backed by an confidential E&Y audit report on serious allegations of Fraud.

"As the Chairman of the Board at the time the EY investigation was commissioned, I instructed my lawyers to write a letter to the Board expressly warning them of the illegality of presenting these accounts to the shareholders without making full disclosure of the facts. This letter was delivered to board members on the 26th June 2014 (See Appendix 1). Unfortunately the letter was ignored by the Board of ETI and this obvious dereliction of duty continues to date."

Ecobank then settled the matter with the chairman and absolved him of any wrongdoing.

In December 2024, a $68 million claim was launched in Dubai against Jeremy Awori, CEO of Ecobank Transnational Inc, and ETI's subsidiaries; ETI Special Resolutions Company (ETISRC), and its Managing Director, Oladele 'Dele' Alabi; Ecobank Nigeria Limited (commonly referred to as Ecobank Nigeria), on allegations of defamation, abusive proceedings, and coercion in Nigeria.

The defendants are alleged to have attempted to coerce Wilben Trade and its CEO, Marcus Wade, into making substantial undue payments to Ecobank Nigeria and ETISRC following a loss suffered in 2015, in what Wilben's legal counsel has described as an extortion attempt.

ETI's leadership, including CEO Awori, has reportedly been aware of ETISRC and its managing director Alabi's alleged extortion against Wilben Trade since August 2023 but has taken no action to stop it.

== Subsidiaries ==
The Specialized subsidiary companies of Ecobank include the following:

- EBI SA Groupe Ecobank - Paris, France
- EBI SA Representative Office - London, United Kingdom
- Ecobank Development Corporation (EDC) - Lomé, Togo
- EDC Investment Corporation - Abidjan, Ivory Coast
- EDC Investment Corporation - Douala, Cameroon
- Ecobank Transnational Incorporated Specialized Resolutions Company - Lagos, Nigeria
- EDC Securities Limited - Lagos, Nigeria
- EDC Stockbrokers Limited - Accra, Ghana
- Ecobank Asset Management - Abidjan, Ivory Coast
- e-Process International SA - Accra, Ghana
- Ecobank Asset Management Company P/L - Harare, Zimbabwe

== The Ecobank Nedbank alliance ==
With more than 1,500 branches in 35 countries, the Ecobank-Nedbank Alliance is the largest banking network in Africa. The alliance was formed in 2008 between the Ecobank Group and the Nedbank Group, one of South Africa's four largest financial services providers, with a growing footprint of operations across the Southern African Development Community.

== Ownership ==
The shares of Ecobank Transnational Inc., the parent company of Ecobank, are traded on three West African stock exchanges, namely: the Ghana Stock Exchange (GSE), the Nigeria Stock Exchange (NSE) and the BRVM stock exchange in Abidjan, Ivory Coast. As of December 2021, the ten largest shareholders in Ecobank Transnational were as follows:

Ecobank Transnational Inc Stock Ownership
| Rank | Name of Owner | Percentage Ownership |
|---|---|---|
| 1 | Nedbank Group Limited | 21.22 |
| 2 | Qatar National Bank | 20.10 |
| 3 | Arise B.V | 14.10 |
| 4 | Government Employees Pension Fund | 13.48 |
| 5 | Social Security and National Insurance Trust | 3.86 |
| 6 | Nkontchou Alain Francis | 1.06 |
| 7 | B.I.D.C | 0.91 |
| 8 | Other Investors | 25.27 |
| | Total | 100.0 |

== See also ==
- Ecobank Ghana
- Ecobank Nigeria
- Ecobank Uganda
- Ecobank Zimbabwe
- List of banks in Africa
