= List of companies of Zimbabwe =

Location of Zimbabwe

Zimbabwe is a landlocked sovereign state located in southern Africa. Mineral exports, gold, agriculture, and tourism are the main foreign currency earners of Zimbabwe.

== Notable firms ==
This list includes notable companies with primary headquarters located in the country. The industry and sector follow the Industry Classification Benchmark taxonomy. Organizations which have ceased operations are included and noted as defunct.

Notable companies Status: P=Private, S=State; A=Active, D=Defunct
| Name | Industry | Sector | Headquarters | Founded | Notes | Status | |
|---|---|---|---|---|---|---|---|
| African Distillers | Consumer goods | Distillers & vintners | Stapleford | 1944 | Distillery, wine | P | A |
| Agricultural Development Bank of Zimbabwe | Financials | Banks | Harare | 1999 | Commercial bank | P | A |
| Air Zimbabwe | Consumer services | Airlines | Harare | 1980 | Flag carrier, airline | S | A |
| ART Holdings | Basic materials | Paper | Harare | 1997 | Paper | P | A |
| Beitbridge Bulawayo Railway | Industrials | Railroads | Beitbridge | 1999 | Railway | P | A |
| Bindura Nickel Corporation | Basic materials | General mining | Bindura | 1971 | General mining | P | A |
| Border Timbers | Basic materials | Forestry | Mutare | 1979 | Forestry, sawmills | P | A |
| Cairns Holdings | Consumer goods | Food & beverage | Harare | 1939 | Food, distillery | P | A |
| CBZ Bank Limited formerly Jewel Bank | Financials | Banks | Harare | 1980 | Bank, part of CBZ Holdings | P | A |
| CBZ Holdings | Financials | Financial services | Harare | 1980 | Multiple financial arms | P | A |
| CFX Bank | Financials | Banks | Harare | 2006 | Commercial bank, defunct in 2009 | P | D |
| Colcom Foods | Consumer goods | Food products | Harare | 1943 | Meat processing | P | A |
| Cotton Company of Zimbabwe | Basic materials | Forestry | Harare | 1994 | Cotton farming, processing | P | A |
| Dairibord | Consumer goods | Food products | Harare | 1997 | Dairy | P | A |
| Delta Corporation | Consumer goods | Beverages | Harare | 1946 | Beverage, beer, soft drink | P | A |
| Ecobank Zimbabwe | Financials | Banks | Harare | 2002 | Commercial bank | P | A |
| Econet Wireless Zimbabwe | Telecommunications | Mobile telecommunications | Harare | 1993 | Wireless telecommunications, core entity founded in Zimbabwe | P | A |
| Fastjet Zimbabwe | Consumer services | Airlines | Harare | 2015 | Low-cost airline | P | A |
| FBC Bank | Financials | Banks | Harare | 1997 | Commercial bank | P | A |
| Hippo Valley Estate | Consumer Goods | Food products | Chiredzi | 1956 | Sugar | P | A |
| Interfin Bank | Financials | Banks | Harare | 1999 | Commercial bank, defunct 2014 | P | D |
| Kingdom Bank Limited | Financials | Banks | Harare | 1997 | Commercial bank, defunct 2013 | P | D |
| MBCA Bank | Financials | Banks | Harare | 1956 | Commercial bank | P | A |
| Meikles | Consumer services | Hotels | Harare | 1915 | Hotels, other real estate | P | A |
| National Railways of Zimbabwe | Industrials | Railroads | Bulawayo | 1980 | National railways | S | A |
| New Limpopo Bridge Ltd | Industrials | Heavy construction | Beitbridge | 1995 | Infrastructure | P | A |
| Royal Bank Zimbabwe | Financials | Banks | Harare | 2001 | Commercial bank, defunct 2012 | P | D |
| Sable Chemicals | Basic materials | Specialty chemicals | Kwekwe | 1965 | Chemicals; ammonium nitrate | P | A |
| Standard Chartered Zimbabwe | Financials | Banks | Harare | 1892 | Commercial bank | P | A |
| Tanganda Tea | Consumer goods | Beverages | Mutare | 1924 | Tea, coffee | P | A |
| Time Bank Zimbabwe | Financials | Banks | Harare | 1997 | Commercial bank | P | A |
| TM Supermarket | Consumer services | Food retailers & wholesalers | Harare | 1978 | Supermarket chain, part of Meikles | P | A |
| Trust Banking Corporation | Financials | Banks | Harare | 1996 | Commercial bank | P | A |
| TSL Limited | Consumer goods | Tobacco | Harare | 1957 | Agricultural, tobacco | P | A |
| Zimbabwe Broadcasting Corporation | Consumer services | Broadcasting & entertainment | Harare | 1963 | State-owned media | S | A |
| Zimbabwe Electricity Supply Authority | Utilities | Conventional electricity | Harare | - | Power | S | A |
| Zimbabwe Iron and Steel Company | Basic materials | Iron & steel | Kwekwe | 1940 | Steel, now NewZim | P | A |
| Zimbabwe flyafrica.com | Consumer services | Airlines | Harare | 2014 | Airline | P | A |
| Zimbabwe Stock Exchange | Financials | Investment services | Harare | 1993 | Stock exchange | P | A |
| Zimbabwe United Passenger Company | Consumer services | Travel & tourism | Harare | 1985 | Bus, transportation | S | A |
| Zimpapers | Consumer services | Media | Harare | 1927 | Newspapers, radio, television | S | A |
| Zimplow Limited | Industrials | Industrial goods & services | Bulawayo | 1939 | Farm equipment | P | A |
| ZimPost | Industrials | Industrial transportation | Harare | 2000 | Postal | S | A |
| Zimswitch | Industrials | Financial administration | Harare | 1994 | Financial transactions | P | A |

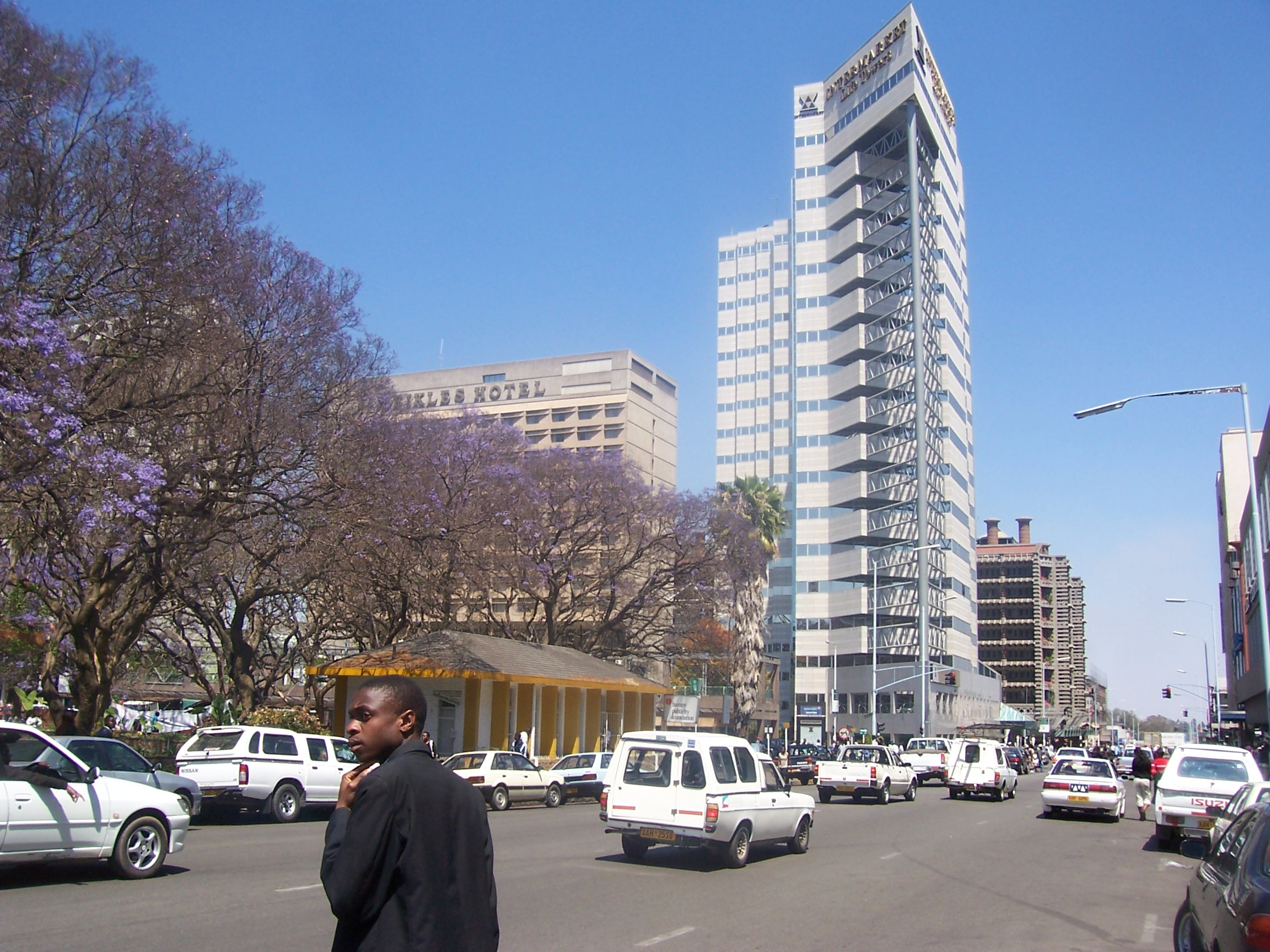
Sam Nujoma Street in Harare.

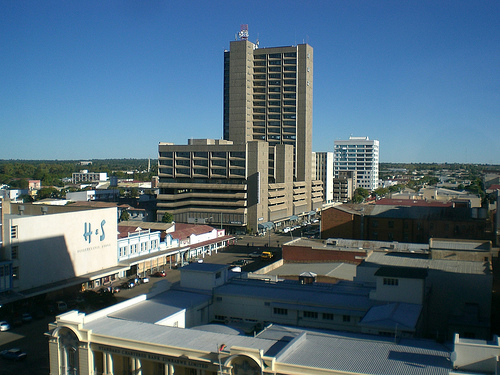
Business district in Bulawayo.

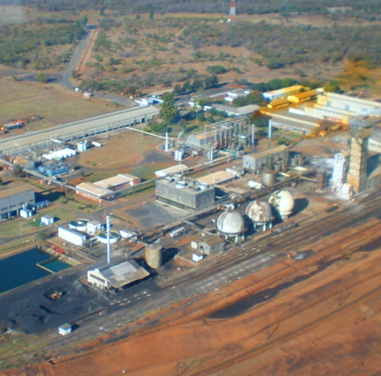
Aerial view of Sable Chemicals in Kwekwe.

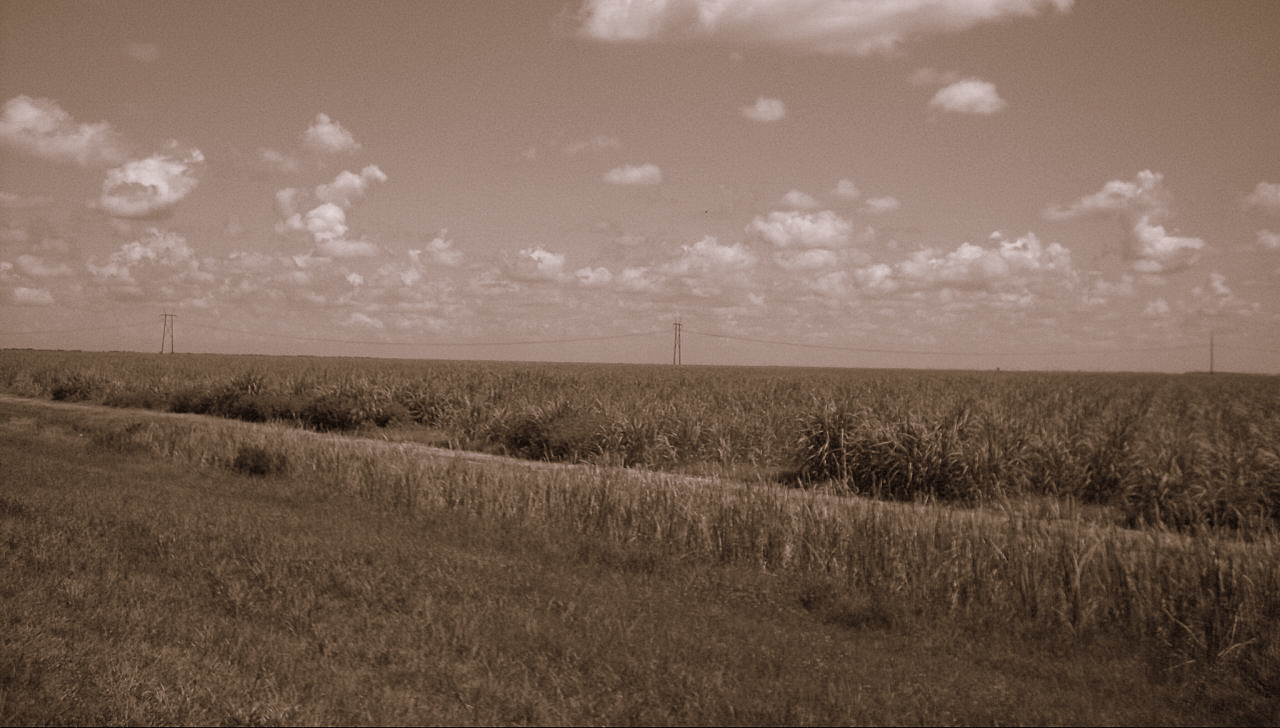
A sugarcane plantation on the Hippo Valley Estate.

== See also ==
- Economy of Zimbabwe
- List of airlines of Zimbabwe
- List of banks in Zimbabwe
