= POSB =

POSB may refer to:

- POSB Bank, a bank in Singapore
- People's Own Savings Bank, a savings bank in Zimbabwe

== See also ==
- Post Office Savings Bank
