= African Distillers =

Zimbabwean producer of alcoholic beverages

- Traded as: ZSE: AFDS
- Industry: Distillery, winery
- Founded: 1944
- Headquarters: Stapleford
- Key people: Stanley Muchenje, Muchaneta Ndachena, Executive directors
- Products: Alcoholic beverages
- Revenue: ▲ZWL$2.76 Billion (2021)
- Website: African Distillers

African Distillers is a company in Zimbabwe. It is one of the largest producers of alcoholic beverages, primarily distilled spirits and wines, in Zimbabwe.

== History ==
The company was founded in 1944 as "P J Joubert Limited", a wine import firm and then purchased a distillery in Mutare in 1946 and began manufacturing beverages in its own right. In 1974, African Distillers moved its headquarters to Stapleford. It was estimated in 1989 that African Distillers produced about 3 million bottles of wine a year, three-quarters of the country's total domestic wine industry. The company's wine production is located at the Green Valley vineyards in Odzi.

== Operations ==
In Zimbabwe, African Distillers maintains 6 supply depots, at Bulawayo, Harare, Kwekwe, Masvingo, Mutare and Victoria Falls. African Distillers operates 3 cash and carry outlet stores, at Harare, Mutare and Bulawayo.

The company's products include

=== Spirit portfolio ===
- whisky: Gold Blend Whisky, Harrier Whisky, Three Ships (3 years and 5 years),
- brandy: Chateau, Viceroy, Heritage,
- gin: Gilberts Gin, Gilbeys Gin
- rum: Admirals Rum
- vodka: Nikolai Vodka, Smirnoff Vodka (1818), Smirnoff Triple Distilled
- ouzo: Hellas Ouzo

=== Wine portfolio ===
- sparkling wines
- fortified wines

== Ownership ==
The stock of African Distillers listed on the Zimbabwe Stock Exchange, where it trades under the symbol AFDS and is part of the Zimbabwe Industrial Index. As of March 2021, the largest shareholders in the company's stock were as depicted in the table below:

African Distillers Stock Ownership
Rank	Name of Owner	Percentage
1	Afdis Holdings (Pvt) Ltd^{1}	70.45
2	Delta Corporation Limited	9.20
3	Stanbic Nominees (Pvt) Ltd	6.21
4	Mining Industry Pension Fund	4.57
5	African Distillers Limited	2.90
6	Local Authorities Pension Fund	1.27
7	Distell International Limited	0.82
8	Others	4.58
	Total	100.00

1→Afdis Holdings is an investment holding company owned by Delta Corporation and Distell Group. Based on direct and indirect shareholding in African Distillers, Delta Corporation and Distell Group's effective control of the company is 50.44% and 30.04% respectively.

== See also ==
- Delta Corporation
- Distell Group Limited
