= Trust Banking Corporation =

Commercial bank in Zimbabwe

- Company type: Private company
- Industry: Financial services
- Founded: 1996
- Headquarters: Harare, Zimbabwe
- Key people: William Nyemba; Group Chief Executive; Nyevero Panyika Hlupo managing director
- Products: Loans, savings, checking, investments, debit cards, credit cards, mortgages
- Revenue: ▼Aftertax:US$3.6 million (2011)
- Total assets: US$38.5 million (2011)
- Website: www.trust.co.zw

Trust Banking Corporation (TBC), commonly referred to as Trust Bank, is a commercial bank in Zimbabwe. It is one of the commercial banks in the country, licensed by the Reserve Bank of Zimbabwe, the national banking regulator.

Trust Bank is a small financial services provider in Zimbabwe. As of December 2011, the bank's total asset valuation was reported as US$38.5 million, with shareholder's equity of $14.8 million.

== History ==
The bank was founded in 1996 as Trust Merchant Bank. It transformed its banking licence to commercial banking licence in 2000, paving the way for its transition to Trust Banking Corporation. The bank grew rapidly, and by 2003, it had become the largest bank in Zimbabwe by balance sheet size. However, its growth came with several problems. As the Zimbabwean economy deteriorated, managers of the bank started in engaging in non-core activities.

In 2004, it was closed down by the Reserve Bank of Zimbabwe (RBZ), the national banking regulator. The assets of the bank were merged with those of Barbican Bank and Royal Bank Zimbabwe, both of which had also been shut down by RBZ, to form Zimbabwe Allied Banking Group (ZABG). The major reason was that the bank was illiquid and its managers had been irresponsible in managing depositors's funds. Prior to this corrective action, Trust has suffered a ZW$7 billion fraud committed by its own staff. This was attributed to weak controls and risk management systems. This worsened its liquidity position, which had hitherto started to deteriorate.

In December 2003, banks such as Standard Chartered Zimbabwe and Stanbic Bank Zimbabwe began rejecting to settle Trust Bank cheques because of its precarious liquidity position. It was kicked out of the central clearing system several times. Following these incidents, Gideon Gono, the RBZ governor, demanded the resignation of William Nyemba (the then CEO), Nyevero Hlupo (who was then the Finance Director) and Chris Goromonzi (who was an executive director). This was a condition for the bank to get liquidity support from the RBZ. A new managing director, Philip Magwada was hired to manage the bank. He was instrumental in getting Trust Bank into ZABG.

Following the dismissal, the dismissed executives challenged the amalgamation of Trust Bank assets into ZABG. Having gone through the litigation route, the cases were dismissed by the High Court and parties appealed to the Supreme Court, which culminated in the Supreme Court also dismissing the cases, but ruled that appellants had overlooked the need to, and must still, appeal to the Reserve Bank in the first instance, as provided by Law, against the alleged "sell" of the two banks' assets to ZABG.

In September 2010, the RBZ reversed itself and re-issued the commercial banking licenses of the three banks that had been closed. ZABG also retained its banking license, bringing the total of commercial banks in the country to seventeen at that time. Trust Bank resumed banking business as a self-sufficient entity on 13 December 2010.

As of April 2012, Trust Bank maintains a network of 10 branches.

== Ownership ==
TBC is a 100% subsidiary of Trust Holdings Limited (THL), a Zimbabwean financial holding company, involved primarily in finance, leasing, insurance and banking. The stock of THL is listed on the Zimbabwe Stock Exchange, where it trades under the symbol: TRUST.

== Affiliated companies ==
Trust Holdings Limited (THL), the holding company, is sometimes referred to as the Trust Group of Companies or simply as the Trust Group. The subsidiaries of THL include the following:

1. Trust Bank
2. Trust Insurance Brokers Limited
3. Trust Properties Limited
4. Trust Agriculture Limited

== See also ==
- List of banks in Zimbabwe
- Reserve Bank of Zimbabwe
- Economy of Zimbabwe
