= Kingdom Bank Limited =

Kingdom Bank Limited may refer to:

- Kingdom Bank Limited (United Kingdom), a bank based in the United Kingdom
- Kingdom Bank Limited (Zimbabwe), a bank based in Zimbabwe, which is a subsidiary of Kingdom Financial Holdings Limited (KFHL), a publicly traded company on the Zimbabwe Stock Exchange
- Kingdom Bank Limited (Kenya), a commercial bank in Kenya, a subsidiary of Cooperative Bank of Kenya.
