= Interfin Bank =

Bank in Zimbabwe

- Company type: Public company
- Traded as: ZSE: INTER
- Industry: Financial services
- Founded: 1999
- Headquarters: Harare, Zimbabwe
- Products: Loans, savings, checking, investments, debit cards, credit cards, mortgages
- Total assets: US$144.5 million (2011)
- Website: Homepage

Interfin Bank, also called Interfin Bank Limited, is a commercial bank in Zimbabwe.

== History ==
The bank was founded in 1999, as Interfin Merchant Bank. In 2009, Interfin Merchant Bank underwrote a rights issue of CFX Financial Services Limited (CFX Financial), a financial services provider with three subsidiary companies in which it held 100% ownership:

1. CFX Bank – A commercial bank
2. CFX Merchant Bank – A merchant bank
3. CFX Asset Management – An asset management company

In 2009, CFX Financial which was formed in 2006, was a publicly traded company on the Zimbabwe Stock Exchange. The rights issue was grossly undersubscribed and Interfin Merchant Bank was left with the equivalent of 40% shareholding in CFX Financial, unsold.

As a result, Interfin acquired a 40% sharehold in CFX Financial. It then began a series of manoeuvres to acquire a controlling ownership interest in its new acquisition, through a share swap. The holding company was renamed Interfin Financial Services Limited, to reflect the new ownership. A reverse merger was executed whereby Interfin became listed on the Zimbabwe Stock Exchange under the slot where CFX Financial used to be. The trading symbol for the new bank holding company became: INTERFIN.

The application was then made to the Reserve Bank of Zimbabwe and the Zimbabwe Ministry of Finance for Interfin Merchant Bank and CFX Financial to merge. The Zimbabwe Ministry of Finance gave its formal approval of the takeover. Subsequently, the Reserve Bank of Zimbabwe also signalled its approval of the merger of the two institutions.

As of August 2011, the bank maintains 11 networked branches:

== Ownership ==
Interfin Bank is a publicly traded company. The shares of stock of its holding company, Interfin Financial Services Limited are listed on the Zimbabwe Stock Exchange, where they trade under the symbol: INTERFIN. An ownership dispute exists, with the former director of ENG Capital Group claiming that assets were illegally acquired by CFX Bank As of August 2011, Interfin Bank's assets were valued at US$144.5 million, with shareholders' equity valued at US$21.2 million.

== Curatorship ==
In June 2012, the Reserve Bank of Zimbabwe placed Interfin Bank under "recuperative curatorship" for a period of six months. This followed the determination by the central bank that Interfin was not in a safe and sound financial condition. Specifically,...."the unsafe and unsound condition of Interfin Bank Limited is attributable to inadequate capitalisation, concentrated shareholding and abuse of corporate structures, high level of non-performing insider and related party exposures, chronic liquidity and income generation challenges, poor board and senior management oversight, as well as violation of banking laws and regulations,"..... The primary purpose of the curatorship is to protect depositors, preserve the assets of Interfin Bank Limited and protect the stability of the financial system, according to the Reserve Bank of Zimbabwe. Peter Bailey of KPMG Chartered Accountants was selected as Curator for the bank. He will determine how the affairs of Interfin will be administered and eventually resolved. Zimbabwean press reports indicate Interfin's capital deficit exceeds US$106 million.

== See also ==
- CFX Bank
- Reserve Bank of Zimbabwe
- Zimbabwe Stock Exchange
- Economy of Zimbabwe
- List of banks in Zimbabwe
