= AFDS =

AFDS may refer to:

== Military ==
- Air Fighting Development Squadron, British Royal Air Force (1950s–1966)
- Airfield defence squadron, Royal Australian Air Force (formed 1941)
- Auxiliary Fighter Directing Ship, a United States Navy hull classification symbol

== Other uses ==
- Academy of Financial Divorce Specialists, the Canadian regulator of Chartered financial divorce analysts
- African Distillers, a Zimbabwean wine and spirit producer (ZSE ticker: AFDS)
- Airforce Delta Strike, a 2004 video game
- Autopilot flight director system, in avionics

== See also ==
- AFD (disambiguation)
