= Cairns Holdings =

Logo

Cairns Holdings is a company of Zimbabwe. It is principally a food company, and is based in Harare. Cairns produces a wide variety of groceries, and produces wine. The company is listed on the Zimbabwe Stock Exchange's industrial index. The company also produces a wide variety of canned food.

== Group structure ==
- Cairns Holdings Limited owns
  - 100% of Paprika Successors Limited;
  - 100% of Cairns Foods Limited; and
  - 60% M E Charhon Limited.
