= Kunle Falodun =

Media expert from Nigeria

- Citizenship: British
- Education: Bachelor's Degree University of Ilorin (1997), MBA University of Bradford United Kingdom
- Occupation: Media expert
- Years active: 2016 - present
- Employer: Sony Pictures Television
- Title: Vice President Distribution Africa for Sony Pictures TV

Kunle Falodun is a Nigerian media expert who currently serves as Vice President Distribution Africa for Sony Pictures Television. Falodun is the first holder of this position following its creation in July 2017. In 2016, Falodun joined a media start up; Econet Media’s Kwese project where he was Head of Business Development. He spent a year at Kwese helping acquire or set up Free TV channels in 8 African countries. He also set up a network of affiliate broadcasters in 30 countries who were receiving Kwese’s premium sports content. He joined Optima Sports Management International (OSMI) in 2004 as Business Development Director and rose to the position of Managing Director before leaving the company.

Falodun graduated from the University of Ilorin with a Bachelor ‘s degree in 1997 and completed an MBA with the University of Bradford in the United Kingdom.
