= Robin Kibuuka =

Ugandan economist

- Born: Uganda
- Citizenship: Uganda
- Education: Yale University (Bachelor of Arts in Economics); Harvard University (Doctor of Philosophy in Economics)
- Occupations: Chairman; Standard Chartered Uganda; Chairman; Uganda Bureau of Statistics
- Years active: 1988 — present
- Known for: Economics, Statistics

Robin Kibuuka is a Ugandan economist. His last name is sometimes spelled Kibuka. He currently serves as the Chairman of Standard Chartered Uganda, the second-largest bank in the country, by assets, valued at about US$965 million (UGX:2.465 trillion), at 31 December 2012. He also serves as he Chairman of Uganda Bureau of Statistics (UBOS), the government-owned statistics evaluation and monitoring agency.

== Education ==
Kibuuka holds the degree of Bachelor of Arts (BA) in Economics from Yale University, in New Haven, Connecticut, United States. His Doctor of Philosophy in economics was obtained from Harvard University, in Cambridge, Massachusetts, United States. He is a graduate from St. Paul's School in Concord, NH.

== Work History ==
Kibuuka spent over 34 years at the International Monetary Fund (IMF), working at the Executive Board of the Institution and in several departments. He also served, at one time, as the Resident Representative for the IMF in Ghana. He has taught Economics at Harvard University and at Makerere University. He has also worked as a Research Assistant at the Yale Economic Growth Centre. He currently serves as the Chairman of both Standard Chartered Uganda and Uganda Bureau of Statistics. He is on the faculty at Strathmore Business School.

== Personal details ==
Kibuuka is married. He has written extensively on a wide range of economic subjects and his work has been widely published in journals and books.

== See also ==
- IMF
- BOU
- AfDB
- World Bank
- Stanchart Uganda
- Uganda Banks
