= Uganda Free Zones Authority =

Government free zones agency in Uganda

Uganda Free Zones Authority UFZA
Agency overview
- Formed: 2014
- Jurisdiction: Government of Uganda
- Headquarters: Colville Street, Kampala, Uganda
- Agency executives: Chairman, Peter Balimunsi; Executive Director, Hez Alinda Kimoomi
- Parent agency: Uganda Ministry of Finance, Planning and Economic Development
- Website: freezones.go.ug

The Uganda Free Zones Authority (UFZA) was a government free zones agency established by the Parliament of Uganda. Operating under the Ministry of Finance, Planning and Economic Development, UFZA was responsible for the establishment, development, management, marketing, maintenance, supervision and control of free zones in Uganda and to provide for other related matters.

== Location ==
The headquarters of UFZA located on 6th Floor, Communications House, Plot 1 Colville Street, in central Kampala is now the headquarters of the merged institution, Uganda Free Zones & Export Promotions Authority (UFZEPA). The coordinates of the head office are: 0° 18' 48.6"N, 32° 35' 3.48"E (Latitude: 0.3135; Longitude: 32.5843).

== Overview ==
UFZA was created by the Ugandan Parliament in 2014 for the establishment, development, management, marketing, maintenance, supervision and control of free zones and other related matters. UFZA works with the government and the private sector to promote the economic growth of Uganda through export oriented investments and infrastructure development.

== Administration ==
In July 2014, Ugandan Finance Minister Maria Kiwanuka appointed economist and private sector development professional Richard Jabo as UFZA's first executive director on a five-year term.

== See also ==
- Free economic zone
- Economy of Uganda
