= Colcom =

Colcom may refer to:

- Colcom Foods, a meat-processing company in Zimbabwe
- Colcom Foundation, a charitable organization in the United States
