= CBZ =

CBZ (or cbz) may refer to:

- Cedric Bixler-Zavala, singer for At the Drive-In, The Mars Volta, Zavalaz, Antemasque
- Carbamazepine, an anticonvulsant and mood stabilizing drug
- Carboxybenzyl, a common amine protecting group in organic synthesis
- CBZ-FM, a CBC Radio 2 station in Fredericton, Canada
- CBZF-FM, a CBC Radio 1 station in Fredericton which had the call sign CBZ until 2004.
- CBZ Holdings, a financial services company of Zimbabwe
- "CBZ (Prime Time)", a song by BSS (Seventeen sub-unit), 2025.
- .cbz, a file extension for the Comic Book Archive file format
- Hero Honda CBZ, a 4-stroke sports oriented bike by Hero Honda Motors India Ltd
