= Border Timbers =

- Traded as: ZSE: BRDR
- Industry: Forestry, sawmilling
- Headquarters: Mutare
- Products: Wood
- Website: http://www.bordertimbers.com/

Border Timbers is a forestry and sawmilling company in Zimbabwe. The company operates five forest estates and three sawmills. Principal products include pine and eucalyptus. Border's stock is listed on the Zimbabwe Stock Exchange and its stock index, the Zimbabwe Industrial Index.

== Operations ==
- Border's forest estates are located in Sheba, Zimbabwe, Imbeza, Charter, Zimbabwe, Tilbury, Zimbabwe and Sawerombe, totalling over 470 square kilometres.
- Border's sawmills are located in Sheba, Charter and Tilbury; annual combined output is over 160,000 cubic meters, 95% percent of which is pine.

Rough sawn timber is either sold directly to customers or processed at one of two Border factories, both located in Mutare:

- The Paulington Factory produces mainly veneer, plywood and blockboard.
- The Nyakamete Factory, also known as Border Timbers International (BTI), is a subsidiary of Border Timbers and produces doors, shelves and other products for the export market, e.g. South Korea and the United States.
