= ART Holdings =

- Traded as: ZSE: ARTD
- Industry: Papermaking
- Founded: 1997
- Headquarters: Harare
- Products: Paper, tissue paper, lead-acid batteries
- Website: http://www.artcorp.co.zw/

ART Holdings (Amalgamated Regional Trading) is a company in Zimbabwe. It is principally a paper manufacturer, including stationery and tissue converting. The ART Group of Companies is active in Zimbabwe, Malawi and throughout Southern Africa.

"ART" stands for "Amalgamated Regional Trading". ART Group is based in Harare and it conducts papermaking operations in Mutare and Kadoma. The company's shares are listed on the Zimbabwe Stock Exchange and is a component of its principal stock index, the Zimbabwe Industrial Index.

== Operations ==
=== Subsidiaries and brands ===
- ART brands include
  - Softex Tissue;
  - Eversharp ball pens and school supplies; and
  - Fleximail paper, board and kraft paper.
- Subsidiaries include:
  - National Waste Collections and Softex, both 50% collaborations between ART and Hunyani Holdings.
  - ART Investments Mauritius, of Mauritius.
  - Chloride Zimbabwe, an ART subsidiary which manufactures lead-acid batteries for the Southern African automotive and tractive industries.
