= Zimplow Limited =

Zimbabwean agro-equipment manufacturer

Zimplow
- Traded as: ZSE: ZIMW
- Industry: Manufacturing
- Founded: 1939
- Headquarters: Bulawayo
- Products: Plows, harrows, cultivators, etc.
- Number of employees: 300
- Website: www.zimplow.com

Zimplow's Mealie Brand logo

Zimplow is a manufacturer based in Zimbabwe. Zimplow makes farm equipment such as plows, harrows, planters, cultivators, hoes, shovels etc. Zimplow is a specialist in animal traction technology and its main equipment brand is the Mealie Brand. Other divisions include C.T.Bolts and Tassburg.

The company's shares are publicly listed on the Zimbabwe Stock Exchange and on its stock index, the Zimbabwe Industrial Index. The company is headquartered in Bulawayo.
