= Afrasia Bank Zimbabwe Limited =

Zimbabwean commercial bank

- Type: Private
- Industry: Financial services
- Founded: 1997
- Defunct: 2015; 11 years ago
- Fate: Closed its banking services in Zimbabwe and moved to Mauritius
- Headquarters: Harare, Zimbabwe
- Key people: Sibusisiwe Bango (Group Chairman)
- Products: Loans, Checking, Savings, Investments, Debit Cards
- Revenue: US$3.3 million (2012)
- Total assets: US$201 million (2012)
- Parent: AfrAsia Bank Limited
- Website: www.afrasiabank.com

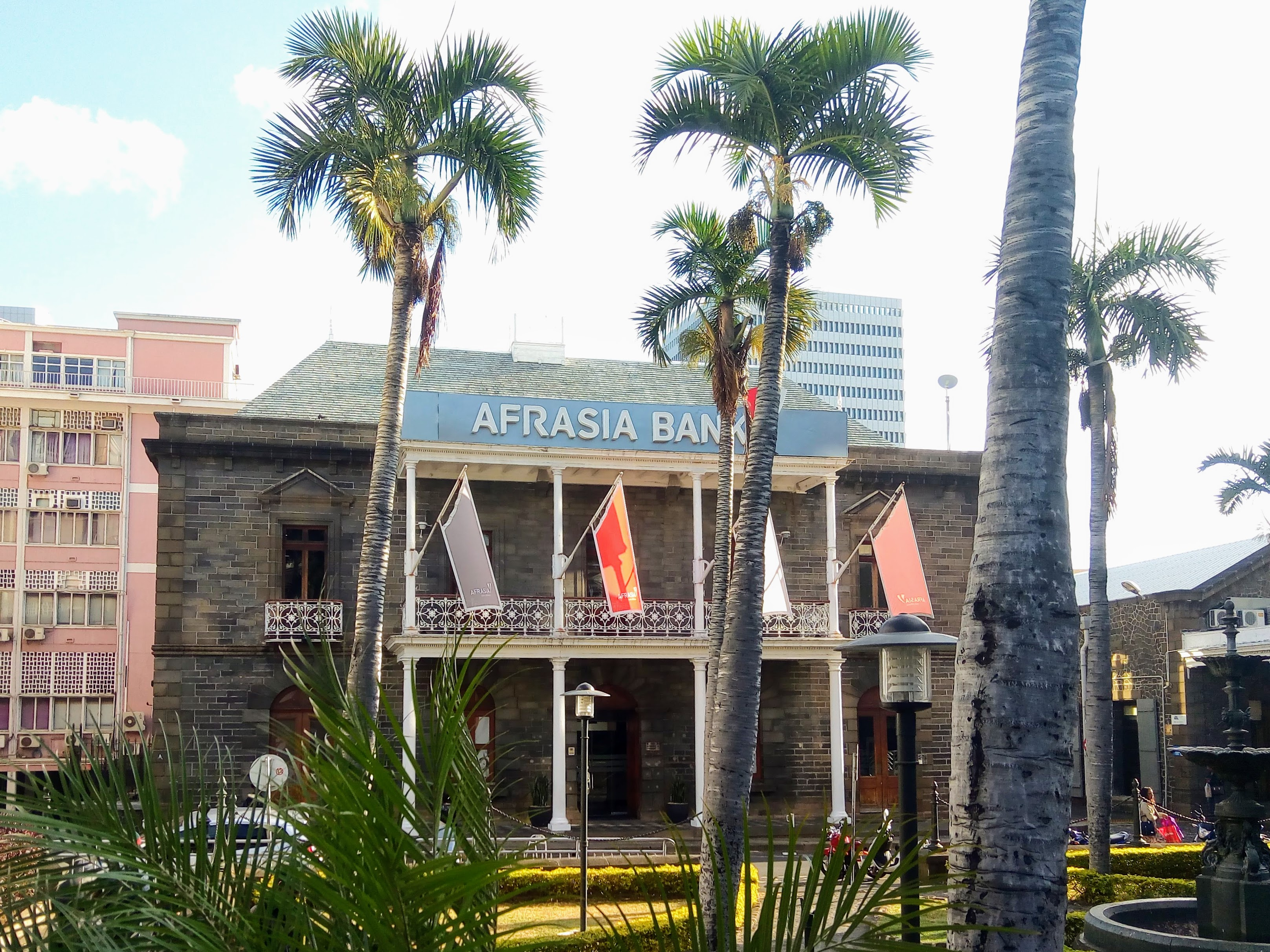
AfrAsia Bank Limited Building Port Louis, Mauritius

Afrasia Bank Zimbabwe was a commercial bank in Zimbabwe that was a subsidiary of AfrAsia Bank Limited. It was one of the regulated banking institutions licensed by the Reserve Bank of Zimbabwe, the country's central bank and national banking regulator.

The bank stopped providing banking services in Zimbabwe in 2015 and the central bank cancelled its license soon afterwards. The bank moved its operations to its parent in Mauritius.

== History ==
The bank was established in 1997, as Kingdom Bank Zimbabwe Limited, by Lysias C Sibanda, Frank Kufa, Nigel Chanakira and Solomon Mugavazi. In January 2012, AfrAsia Bank Limited, a financial services provider, based in Mauritius, invested US$9.5 million in the bank's holding company, thereby acquiring 35% ownership in the Zimbabwean financial group.

Until September 2013, the bank was a subsidiary of Kingdom Financial Holdings Limited (KFHL), a publicly traded company on the Zimbabwe Stock Exchange. In 2013, due to changes in ownership, KFHL rebranded to AfrAsia Zimbabwe Holdings Limited (AZHL). The 35.7% shareholding that the holding company previously held in Kingdom Africa Bank Limited, an investment bank in Botswana, was disposed of in September 2013.

In 2015 AfrAsia Bank Zimbabwe ceased its banking operations in the country to refocus on profitable business lines. James Benoit, CEO of AfrAsia Bank, said: "The difficulties that AfrAsia Bank Zimbabwe was facing arose primarily from legacy issues within the bank and the difficult economic environment within the country."

== Subsidiaries ==
The AfrAsia Bank Zimbabwe Group included the following bank subsidiaries:

1. AfrAsia Capital Management (Private) Limited
2. MicroKing Finance Limited - A microfinance company

== Shareholding ==
As of October 2013, shareholding in the stock of the bank, is as depicted in the table below:

Afrasia Bank Zimbabwe Limited Stock Ownership

Rank	Name of Owner	Percentage Ownership
1	AfrAsia Bank Limited of Mauritius	54.0
2	Others	46.0
	Total	100.00

== See also ==
- List of banks in Zimbabwe
- Reserve Bank of Zimbabwe
- Economy of Zimbabwe
- FDH Bank
