= Cotton Company of Zimbabwe =

Cotton processing and marketing organization in Zimbabwe

The Cotton Company of Zimbabwe
- Traded as: ZSE: COTT
- Industry: Cotton
- Founded: 1994
- Headquarters: Harare
- Key people: Patison Sithole (Director)
- Products: Cotton lint, cottonseed
- Website: http://www.thecottoncompany.com/

The Cotton Company of Zimbabwe, is a large cotton processing and marketing organization in Southern Africa. The company, known as "COTTCO", works with individual cotton farmers, providing agronomic and financial support. Cottco is listed on the Zimbabwe Stock Exchange and its stock index, the Zimbabwe Industrial Index. Its head offices are located in Harare. Cotton, export internationally via COTTCO, is one of the larger generators of foreign currency for Zimbabwe.
