= MBCA =

MBCA may refer to:

- Manitoba Court of Appeal
- Migratory Birds Convention Act - Canadian federal legislation to protect migratory birds in conjunction with the United States.
- Model Business Corporation Act - A model set of law prepared by the Committee on Corporate Laws of the Section of Business Law of the American Bar Association
- MBCA Bank - A commercial bank in Zimbabwe
