= Allied Bank =

Allied Bank may refer to:

- Allied Banking Corporation, a commercial bank in the Philippines
- Allied Bank Limited, a commercial bank in Pakistan
- Allied Bank Zimbabwe Limited, a commercial bank in Zimbabwe
- Allied Bank Uganda Limited, the name of Bank of Africa (Uganda) from 1996 until 2006
