= Pathward =

Federally chartered savings bank

Pathward Financial, Inc.
- Formerly: Meta Financial Group, Inc.
- Type: Public
- Traded as: Nasdaq: CASH; S&P 600 component
- Industry: Financial services
- Founded: 1954; 72 years ago in Storm Lake, Iowa, U.S. Incorporated in Delaware on June 14, 1993; 33 years ago
- Founder: Stanley H. Haahr
- Headquarters: Sioux Falls, South Dakota, U.S.
- Area served: Nationwide
- Key people: Brett Pharr (CEO); Anthony Sharett (president); Greg Sigrist (EVP & CFO)
- Products: Consumer banking Commercial banking Credit cards Finance & Insurance; Mortgage loans Prepaid cards ATM sponsorship ACH origination
- Revenue: ▲US$704.46 million (FY SEP 30 2023)
- Operating income: ▲US$182.13 million (FY SEP 30 2023)
- Net income: ▲US$163.62 million (FY SEP 30 2023)
- Total assets: ▲US$7.54 billion (FY SEP 30 2023)
- Total equity: ▲US$650.63 million (FY SEP 30 2023)
- Number of employees: 1,193 (FY SEP 30 2023)
- Website: www.pathward.com

Pathward Financial, Inc. (formerly known as MetaBank) is a U.S.-based banking and financial services company. It adopted its current name in 2022 after its parent, Meta Financial Group, sold the "Meta" trademark to Meta Platforms.

The bank operates in several segments within the banking and payments industry: banking as a service, commercial finance and tax services.

== History ==
=== Founding ===
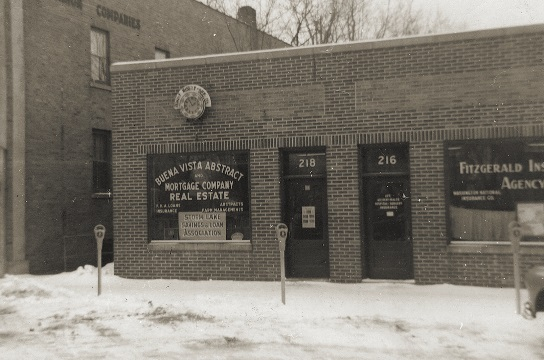
Original Storm Lake Savings and Loan Association building

Pathward was founded as Storm Lake Savings and Loan Association in 1954 by Stanley H. Haahr, who remained on the Board of Directors until 1990 and served as board chairman from 1981 to 1990. The bank purchased the Bradford Hotel property in Storm Lake at Fifth and Erie in 1970, and construction was completed on the bank's new headquarters in 1972. By 1993, the bank changed its name from First Federal Savings and Loan Association of Storm Lake to First Federal Savings Bank of the Midwest, a subsidiary of First Midwest Financial, Inc. On September 20, 1993, 1.9 million shares of stock in First Midwest Financial, Inc., were issued at $10 per share and began trading on the NASDAQ stock market under the symbol “CASH.”

=== Acquisitions ===
In 1994, Brookings Federal Bank, a federal savings bank in Brookings, South Dakota, was acquired and operated as the Brookings Federal Bank Division of First Federal Savings Bank of the Midwest. In December 1995, Iowa Savings Bank in Des Moines was purchased and operated as the Iowa Savings Bank Division of First Federal Savings Bank of the Midwest.

In January 2018, Pathward acquired Crestmark Bank.

In March 2020, Pathward announced the sale of its community bank division to Central Bank, a state-chartered bank headquartered in Storm Lake, Iowa.

=== Expansion ===
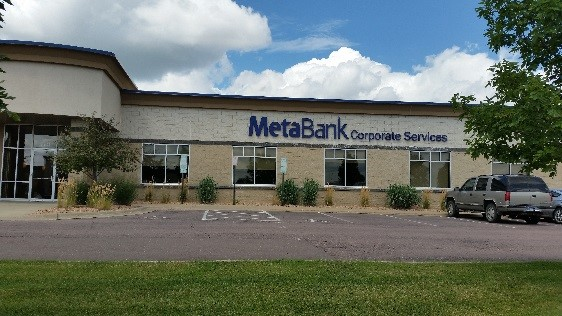
MetaBank Corporate Services Headquarters in Sioux Falls

First Federal opened the doors to its first Sioux Falls office – a temporary facility – on September 6, 2000. In 2004, the Meta Payment Systems (MPS) division was established in Sioux Falls. The next year, in 2005, all bank divisions under First Federal changed their names to MetaBank, inhabiting four market areas: Central Iowa; Northwest Iowa; Brookings; and Sioux Falls. In 2009, MetaBank introduced a new retail product line and the MPS division became a leading issuer of rebate and gift cards in the United States and worldwide and one of the top issuers of Visa, MasterCard and Discover prepaid cards.

In 2014, MetaBank announced the acquisition of AFS/IBEX Financial Services Inc., an insurance premium financing company based in Dallas, Texas.

MetaBank announced the acquisition of Refund Advantage, a tax refund-transfer software company based in Louisville, Kentucky, in 2015.

In 2016, MetaBank announced two acquisitions: EPS Financial in November and Specialty Consumer Services (SCS) in December. EPS provides tax-related financial transaction solutions. They are headquartered in Easton, Pennsylvania SCS provides consumer tax advance services through its underwriting and loan management system. SCS is based in Hurst, Texas.

Pathward issued debit cards of up to $600 sent to millions of Americans as part of the second round of COVID-19 Economic Impact Payments in January 2021. MetaBank acted as the U.S. Treasury's "financial agent" for this purpose.

=== Illegal Activities and Fines ===
In 2024, Pathward Bank has agreed to pay about $700,000 in refunds and penalties stemming from an investigation conducted by the New York Attorney General's Office that revealed the bank unlawfully froze customer accounts and illegally transferred money to debt collectors.

In 2025, a victim of the TreasuryDirect fake website scam reportedly had their funds laundered through Pathward Bank.

=== Corporate leadership ===
James S. Haahr became President and Chief Executive Officer of Meta Financial Group, Inc., in 1993. J. Tyler Haahr took over the position of President and CEO in 2005. In 2011, James Haahr resigned as chairman, and J. Tyler Haahr became chairman and CEO. James and Tyler Haahr are the son and grandson of founder Stanley Haahr.

Brad Hanson served as President of the Meta Payment Systems division beginning with its inception in 2004. He was appointed President of Meta Financial Group and MetaBank in 2013.

In 2021, Hanson announced his plans to retire, and Brett Pharr was named the new CEO and Anthony Sharett was named the new President of Meta Financial and MetaBank.

Glen Herrick joined MetaBank in 2013 and served as Executive Vice President and Chief Financial Officer of Meta Financial Group and MetaBank. In 2023, Herrick retired from Pathward and was succeeded by Greg Sigrist.

Nadia Dombrowski joined MetaBank in 2022 as Executive Vice President, Chief Legal Officer and later her title changed to Executive Vice President, Chief Legal and Administrative Officer as her role expanded.

Charles Ingram joined MetaBank in 2020 as Executive Vice President, Chief Information Officer and in 2021 his title changed to Executive Vice President and Chief Technology and Product Officer as his role expanded.

=== Sale of trademark and rebranding ===
In December 2021, Meta Financial Group sold its "Meta" trademark to Facebook's parent company (now called Meta Platforms) for $60 million. The agreement required Meta Financial Group to phase out the trademark within one year. In March 2022, the financial services company announced it would change its brand to Pathward.

== Locations and divisions ==
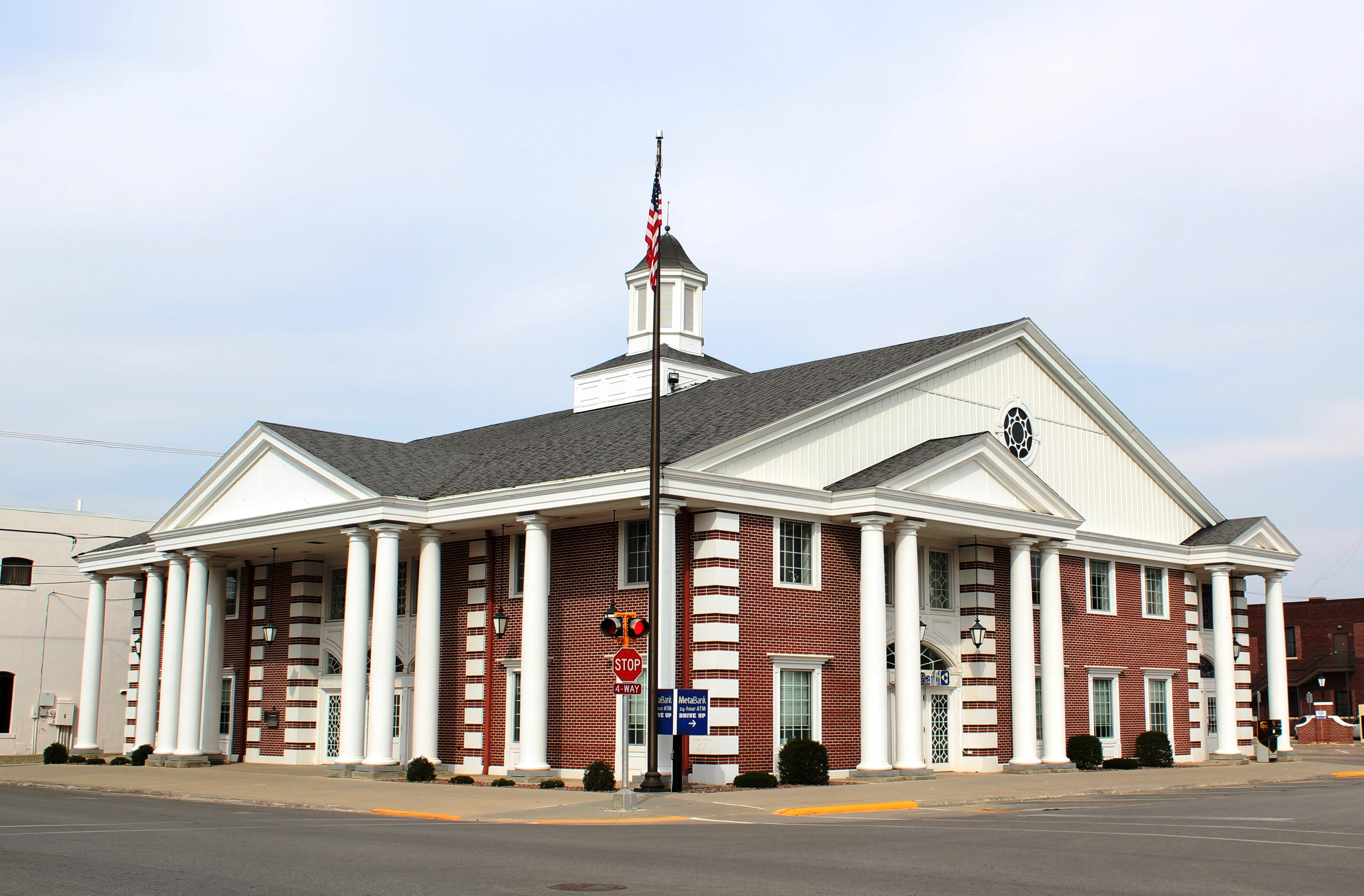
Metabank branch in Storm Lake

Pathward is headquartered in Sioux Falls, South Dakota The Insurance Premium Finance business unit is headquartered in Dallas, Texas, with an additional office in Newport Beach, California. Refund Advantage is headquartered in Louisville, Kentucky. EPS is headquartered in Easton, Pennsylvania. SCS is headquartered in Hurst, Texas.

Pathward's Insurance Premium Finance unit provides short-term, collateralized financing to facilitate the purchase of insurance for commercial property, casualty and liability risk. The business unit originates loans through a network of independent insurance agencies.

Refund Advantage, based in Louisville, Kentucky, provides tax refund-transfer software for Electronic Return Originators (EROs) and their customers.

EPS Financial (EPS) provides refund settlement products, prepaid payroll card solutions and merchant services. EPS is headquartered in Easton, Pennsylvania.

Specialty Consumer Services (SCS) provides consumer tax advance services through its proprietary underwriting model and loan management system. Based in Hurst, Texas, SCS was a pioneer for no-fee refund advance products.

== Awards and honors ==
In 2024 and 2023, Pathward earned a Great Place to Work® certification.

In 2024, Forbes named Pathward to its 2024 list of America's Best Banks, Nacha named Pathward one of the Top 50 financial institution originators and receivers of ACH payments in the country, and Keefe, Bruyette & Woods, Inc. named Pathward Financial to the KBW Bank Honor Roll.

Pathward, N.A., ranks among Investor's Business Daily's (IBD) list of 100 Best ESG Companies for 2023.

Newsweek ranked Pathward among America's Greatest Workplaces; Greatest Workplaces for Women; Greatest Workplaces for Diversity; and Greatest Workplaces for Parents and Families in 2023.

Pathward was included among the Sandler O’Neill and Partners "Bank and Thrift Sm-All Stars – Class of 2012", which ranked the top 25 performing small-cap banks in the country. MetaBank was also named fifth in the nation among top-performing, mid-size banks by the American Banking Association Journal in 2013. MetaBank ranked among the top 25 among the nation's community banks and thrifts, according to American Banker magazine, in 2013 and was named to the Top 200 Community Banks and Thrifts list again in 2014.

Pathward was named one of the top performing banks with assets of $1B to $10B by American Banker in 2015. AFS/IBEX division was selected by the Independent Insurance Agents of Texas (IIAT) to be its exclusive premium finance company of choice in 2015. In 2016, Bank Director Magazine named MetaBank the number one top growth bank of 7,000 banks nationwide. Pathward received an investment grade rating by Kroll Bond Rating Agency in 2016. EPS was named "Business of the Year (25–100 employees) by Lehigh Valley Business in 2016.

Meta Payment Systems division cofounder and Pathward President Brad Hanson received a 2009 Industry Achievement Award from Paybefore in 2009. Pathward's Senior Vice President and Chief Legal Officer John Hagy was named among the Top 10 Payments Lawyers by Paybefore in 2015.
