= TSL Limited =

Zimbabwean company

TSL (formerly Tobacco Sales Ltd) (ZSE: TSL) is a company based in Harare, Zimbabwe. TSL was founded in 1957 as an auction house for tobacco, and in the late 1960s began to diversify into logistics and agronomy. The company's stock is listed on the Zimbabwe Stock Exchange and its stock index, the Zimbabwe Industrial Index.
