= AFD =

AFD or variations may refer to:

== Government and politics ==
=== Germany ===
- Alternative für Deutschland (AfD), a far-right party (formed in 2013)
- Allianz für Deutschland (AfD), a 1990 East German coalition

=== United States ===
- Alexandria Fire Department, in Virginia
- Anaheim Fire & Rescue, in California
- Austin Fire Department, in Texas

=== Elsewhere ===
- Alliance for Freedom and Democracy, Ethiopia (formed in 2006)
- Alliance des forces démocratiques, Ivory Coast (2014–2015)
- Agence française de développement, France (formed in 1941)

== Language ==
- Andai language, spoken on New Guinea (ISO 639-3:afd)

== Online media ==
- Adult Film Database
- Articles for deletion, a process used on Wikipedia
- Australian Faunal Directory

== Technology ==
- Active Format Description, set of codes for television or set-top-box decoders
- Adjustable-frequency drive, to control AC motor speed
- Advanced Format Drive, computer storage device
- AF-D, model designation for Nikon F-mount camera lenses

== Transport and military ==
- Airport/Facility Directory (A/FD), United States
- Auxiliary floating drydock, United States Navy
- Admiralty Floating Dock, a British Navy floating drydock
- Port Alfred Airport, South Africa (IATA:AFD)

== See also ==
- AFDS (disambiguation)
