= NMB =

NMB may stand for:

== Businesses ==
- NMB (Tanzania), a bank
- NMB Technologies, a subsidiary of MinebeaMitsumi
- NMB Bank Nepal
- NMB Bank Limited, Zimbabwe

== Places ==
- Namibia, ITU country code nmb
- Nelson Mandela Bay Metropolitan Municipality, in South Africa
- North Miami Beach, Florida, a city in the U.S.
- North Myrtle Beach, South Carolina
- Daman Airport, Daman and Diu, India, IATA airport code NMB

== Other uses ==
- National Mediation Board, an independent agency of the U.S. government
- The Neal Morse Band, stylized as NMB since 2021
- Neuromedin B, a peptide in mammals
- New methylene blue, an organic staining agent
- Nilgiri Malabar Battalion, British Indian Army battalion
- Big Nambas language, ISO 639 code nmb

== See also ==
- NMB48, a Japanese music group
