= Steward Bank =

Commercial bank in Zimbabwe

Coordinates: 17°49′38″S 31°03′11″E

Steward Bank Limited
- Company type: Private
- Industry: Financial services
- Founded: 2013; 13 years ago
- Headquarters: 79 Livingstone Avenue; Harare, Zimbabwe
- Key people: Bernard Chidzero Jr. (Chairman); Courage Mashavave (Chief Executive Officer)
- Revenue: ▲US$6,155,096 (2017); US$5,412,080 (2016)
- Total assets: ▲US$226,058,440 (2017); US$168,692,986 (2016)
- Number of employees: 325 (2018)
- Parent: Cassava Smartech
- Website: www.stewardbank.co.zw

Steward Bank, whose official name is Steward Bank Limited, is a commercial bank in Zimbabwe. It is one of the regulated banking institutions licensed by the Reserve Bank of Zimbabwe, the central bank and national banking regulator.

== Location ==
The headquarters and main branch of Steward Bank are located at 79 Livingstone Avenue, in Harare, the capital and largest city of Zimbabwe. The geographical coordinates of the bank's headquarters are: 17°49'38.0"S, 31°03'11.0"E (Latitude:-17.827222; Longitude:31.053056).

== Overview ==
The bank is a medium-sized retail bank in Zimbabwe. As of February 2017, the total asset valuation of the bank was US$226,058,440, with shareholders' equity of US$75,046,584. In November 2013, the shareholders' equity was valued at US$76.9 million, making it one of the top five capitalized banks in the country.

== History ==
The bank was established in 2013, as a commercial bank. Prior to that, the company had existed as a finance house since 1999. In 2006, the bank, executed a merger with Trustfin Financial Services Limited. In December 2009, TNFH, the holding company of TN Bank, successfully completed a reverse merger with Tedco, another Zimbabwean enterprise, to form TN Holdings, the parent company of the TN Group of Companies. TN Holdings Limited, besides owning TN Financial Limited, the parent company of TN Bank, also owned TN Medical, an owner-operator of medical facilities including a medical insurance subsidiary, TN Asset Management and TN Harlequin, an upscale home and office furnishings manufacturer and distributor, among other interests.

In July 2012 Econet Wireless, the largest mobile telephone provider in Zimbabwe, acquired 45% shareholding in the bank. In February 2013, Econet acquired the remaining 55% shareholding, thereby turning TN Bank into a 100% subsidiary of the mobile phone company. At that time the shares of the bank were delisted from the ZSE. Following the divestiture from TN Bank, TN Holdings Limited rebranded to Lifestyle Holdings Limited.

In July 2013, TN Bank rebranded to Steward Bank and began a series of reforms to separate itself from its former owners, including setting up a new Board of Directors, creating a new corporate logo, launching a new website and relocating its branches away from Lifestyle Holdings locations.

In June 2019, Dr. Lance Mambondiani resigned and was replaced by former Econet Wireless CFO, Kris Chirairo.

== Ownership ==
During 2012 and early 2013, Econet Wireless the largest communications company in Zimbabwe, whose shares are listed on the Zimbabwe Stock Exchange, acquired controlling shareholding in TN Bank, the predecessor of Steward Bank, thereby making it an Econet subsidiary. In July 2013, TN Bank rebranded to Steward Bank.

== Branches ==
As of May 208, Steward Bank maintained a network of branches at the following locations:

1. Livingstone Branch: 79 Livingstone Avenue, Harare
2. Avondale Branch: 7 King George Road at Corner with Lanark Road, Avondale, Harare
3. Eastgate Branch: Corner of Robert Mugabe Street and 3rd Street, Eastgate, Harare
4. Joina City Branch: Upper Ground Floor, Joina City, Harare
5. Bulawayo Branch: Bambanani Centre, Corner 9th Avenue and Jason Moyo, Bulawayo
6. Gweru Branch: 124 Main Street, Gweru
7. Mutare Branch: 49-51 Second Street, Mutare
8. Masvingo Branch: 33 H. Chitepo Street, Masvingo.

== See also ==
- List of banks in Zimbabwe
- Reserve Bank of Zimbabwe
- Economy of Zimbabwe
- Zimbabwe Stock Exchange
