= Alfred Bentley =

Alfred Bentley or Alf Bentley may refer to:

- Alfred Mulock Bentley (1878–1956), British-born financier
- Alf Bentley (footballer, born 1887) (1887–1940), English football centre-forward
- Alf Bentley (footballer, born 1931) (1931–1996), English football goalkeeper
