= Marianne Mwaniki =

Kenya corporate executive and banker

- Born: 1976 (age 49–50); Kenya
- Citizenship: Kenyan
- Education: London School of Economics (Master of Science in Economics)
- Occupations: Economist, business executive
- Years active: 1998–present
- Title: Senior vice president of Social Impact at Visa Inc.

Marianne Mwaniki, is a corporate executive and banker, who has served as the senior vice president of social impact at Visa, Inc. since 10 September 2018.

== Background and education ==
Mwaniki was born in Kenya. She attended Alliance Girls High School, in the town of Kikuyu in Kiambu District. She graduated from the London School of Economics with a master's degree in 1998.

== Career ==
Mwaniki has an extensive career in banking. For a 10-year period, starting in January 2002, she worked at Standard Chartered, starting out as a general manager, personal loans at Standard Chartered Kenya. She rose through the ranks, over the years, including as head of strategic human resources programmes and as a senior sustainability manager. For the two years from 2010 to 2012, she served as the head of sustainability, stakeholder engagement and reputational risk, based at the banking conglomerates headquarters in London.

In her role as senior vice president of social impact at Visa Inc., she is responsible for the company's strategy in the areas of financial literacy, financial inclusion, corporate social responsibility and corporate philanthropy programmes. In her new role, she is also the head of the Visa Foundation, the company's CSR arm.

== Other considerations ==
Mwaniki serves as a member of the board of directors of the British Chamber of Commerce Kenya. She is a founding member of the Africa Leadership Network. In 2018, she was named among Kenya's Top 40 under 40, by Business Daily Africa, a Nairobi-based English newspaper.
