= NMB Bank Limited =

Zimbabwe commercial bank

Coordinates: 17.784164°S 31.077851°E

- Type: Private
- Traded as: LSE: NMB
- Industry: Financial services
- Founded: 1993; 33 years ago
- Headquarters: 19207 Borrowdale Road, Harare, Zimbabwe
- Key people: Pearson Gowero; Chairman; Gerald Gore; Chief Executive Officer
- Products: Loans, Savings, Checking, Investments, Debit Cards, Credit Cards, Mortgages
- Revenue: ▲Aftertax:US$10.3 million (2017)
- Total assets: US$422.6 million (2017)
- Number of employees: 425 (2024)
- Website: Homepage

NMB Bank Limited, previously known as National Merchant Bank of Zimbabwe Limited, is a commercial bank in Zimbabwe. It is licensed by the Reserve Bank of Zimbabwe, the central bank of that country and the national banking regulator.

== Location ==
The headquarters of this bank and its main branch, are located at 19207 Liberation Legacy Way (formerly Borrowdale Road), Borrowdale, in Harare, the capital and largest city of Zimbabwe. The bank has 14 branches across Zimbabwe as well as over agents in over 130 locations making it the bank with the largest footprint in the country.

== Overview ==
The bank is a medium-sized financial services institution, that serves large corporations, small to medium enterprises (SMEs), as well as individuals. As of December 2017, the bank's total assets were valued at US$422.6 million, with shareholders' equity valued at US$65.65 million.

== History ==
NMB Bank Limited was founded in 1993 by Zimbabweans. At that time it was under the name National Merchant Bank of Zimbabwe. In June 1993, the bank was registered as an accepting house under the Banking Act. In 1997, the NMBZ Group was listed on the Zimbabwe Stock Exchange and simultaneously on the London Stock Exchange. In December 1999, NMB Bank was granted a commercial banking licence. It commenced commercial banking services in July 2000.

In 2013, FMO, Norfund and AfricInvest, jointly invested US$14.8 million in NMB Holdings Limited, the parent company of NMB Bank, for a collective shareholding of 27 percent.

== Ownership ==
The bank is a 100% subsidiary of NMBZ Holdings Limited (NMBZ), a Zimbabwean investment and holding company. NMB Bank Limited is the principal subsidiary of NMBZ. The stock of the holding company is listed on the Zimbabwe Stock Exchange and on the London Stock Exchange. As of December 2017, the shareholding in the stock of the holding company is as illustrated in the table below:

Shareholding in NMB Holdings Limited
Rank	Shareholder	Percentage ownership
1	African Century Financial Investments Limited	18.50
2	Arise BV*	17.96
3	AfricInvest Financial Sector Holding	8.38
4	Old Mutual Life Assurance Company of Zimbabwe Limited	7.45
5	Old Mutual Zimbabwe Limited	6.90
6	Lalibela Limited	5.59
7	Alsace Trust	4.39
8	Cornerstone Trust	4.38
9	Wamambo Investments Trust	3.52
10	Drakmore Investments Private Limited	2.85
6	Others	19.49
	Total	100.00

- Note:Arise BV is a special purpose vehicle company, formed in 2016 and co-owned by Norfund, FMO and Rabobank. Arise invests in African financial institutions.

== Branch network ==
As of December 2024, the bank maintained a network of 14 branches.

== See also ==
- List of banks in Zimbabwe
- Reserve Bank of Zimbabwe
- Economy of Zimbabwe
