= CBZ Holdings =

Zimbabwean financial services conglomerate

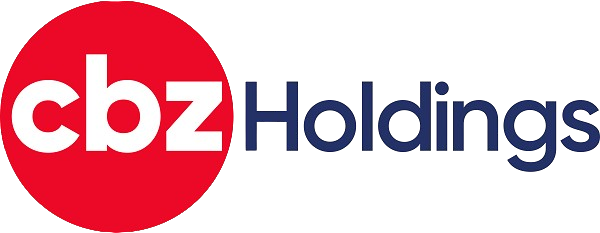
- CBZ Holdings logo
- Type: Public
- Traded as: ZSE: CBZ
- Industry: Financial services
- Founded: 1980; 46 years ago
- Headquarters: Harare, Zimbabwe
- Key people: Luxon Zembe (Group chairman); Lawrence Nyazema (Group chief executive)
- Products: Debit cards, credit cards, mortgages, wealth management, properties
- Revenue: ▲ Aftertax: ZWG 868.1 billion (H1 2025)
- Total assets: ZWG 33.97 trillion (2024)<
- Number of employees: 1,200 (2025)
- Website: cbz.co.zw

CBZ Holdings Limited is a diversified financial services conglomerate in Zimbabwe. The group operates through subsidiaries in banking, insurance, asset management, investments, wealth management, mortgages, and retail finance. Its shares trade on the Zimbabwe Stock Exchange under the symbol CBZ.

== History ==
The flagship business of the Group, CBZ Bank Limited, was founded in 1980 as the Bank of Credit and Commerce Zimbabwe Limited. It was taken over by the Government of Zimbabwe in 1991, to avert looming liquidation after its parent company collapsed and was renamed Commercial Bank of Zimbabwe Limited. Paul Tangi Mhova Mkondo was one of the main principal founders of the bank.

=== Leadership of Gideon Gono ===
Gideon Gono was appointed the Chief Executive of the bank in 1995. The first major action under his tenure was to move the bank's non-performing loans to a spin-off, CBZ Nominees Limited. In 1996, the bank made a record $10 million profit, which would increase to $130,1 million by 1998

CBZ would be then be fully privatized in 1998 with the government selling 55% of its stake in the company on the Zimbabwe Stock Exchange.

=== Leadership of John Mangudya ===
After Gono was elevated to the Governorship of the Reserve Bank of Zimbabwe, John Mangudya would become the Chief Executive. In 2005, the company rebranded, creating CBZ Bank as the main business and CBZ Holdings Limited as the holding company. The company would have also spinoff CBZ Asset Management (Private) Limited trading as Datvest, as a separate business.

Absa Group would divest its share in the bank in 2006. As part of its diversification strategy, The Group would later found Optimal Insurance (Private) Limited in 2006. CBZ would also acquire Beverly Building Society in 2007. It would launch CBZ Properties (Private) Limited that year. In 2010, the Group would consolidate its banking and building society.

=== Post-Mangudya era ===
Never Nyemudzo would be appointed the Chief Executive after John Mangudya would move to the RBZ in 2014. The bank would sell $200 million worth of government bonds, backed by Afreximbank. In 2016, CBZ would launch CBZ Touch, a mobile app which Techzim would describe as "a gateway to its [CBZ] entire service line"

Nyemudzo would leave in 2017, with the bank given a US$385m fine by OFAC for facilitating thousands of transactions on behalf of an entity then on the sanctions list, ZB Bank Limited.

In 2019, CBZ would launch Red Sphere Finance, a microfinance institution.

== Subsidiaries ==
CBZ's subsidiaries are classified into four clusters:

=== Banking ===
- CBZ Bank Limited
- Red Sphere Finance
- CBZ Custodial Services

=== Insurance ===
- CBZ Life
- CBZ Insurance
- CBZ Risk Advisory Services

=== Agri-Business ===
- CBZ Agro-Yield

=== Investment ===
- Datvest (CBZ Asset Management)
- CBZ Properties
- CBZ Asset Management (Mauritius)
- CBZ Capital
