= Econet Zimbabwe =

Zimbabwean telecommunications company

- Company type: Public
- Industry: Telecommunications
- Founded: July 1998
- Founder: Strive Masiyiwa
- Headquarters: Msasa, Harare, Zimbabwe
- Net income: ▲ZWG9.6 billion (2025)
- Parent: Econet Global
- Subsidiaries: EcoCash; EcoSure; Omni AI
- Website: econet.co.zw
- Footnotes / references Financials as of February 28, 2025. References

Econet Wireless, officially known as Econet Wireless Zimbabwe (EWZ) Limited or commonly referred to as just Econet is a Zimbabwean telecom operator that is headquartered at No. 2 Msasa, Harare. It is the largest telecommunications operator with 11,782,975 mobile subscriptions in Q2 2025 and the second largest company by market capitalisation listed on the ZSE.

Econet was incorporated in 1993, and only started to operate in 1998 after a protracted legal battle with the former Postal and Telecommunications Company of Zimbabwe, now called TelOne Zimbabwe. It began operation in July 1998, making it the first privately owned telecom in the country. Three months later, it listed on the Zimbabwe Stock Exchange in September 1998, making it the youngest ZSE Initial Public Offering in its history, with 10% of foreign ownership at listing in 1998.

The company recorded high growth in the following years. It started 3G services in 2007, making Zimbabwe the third country at the time to introduce 3G. In 2005, it expanded into making a payments network for NGOs and other entitites, with it having a 99.8% of the mobile money market share in 2017.

== Overview ==
Econet Wireless Zimbabwe maintained its position as one of ZSE’s big three with a peak evaluation of US$3.2 billion in August 2018. It has a market share of over 70%.

== Market Performance ==
Market capitalization of Econet Wireless Zimbabwe slowed down from a peak of US$3.2 billion in August 2018 to ZWL7.07 trillion (US$785 million) in January 2024.
