= Alfred Beit Road Bridge =

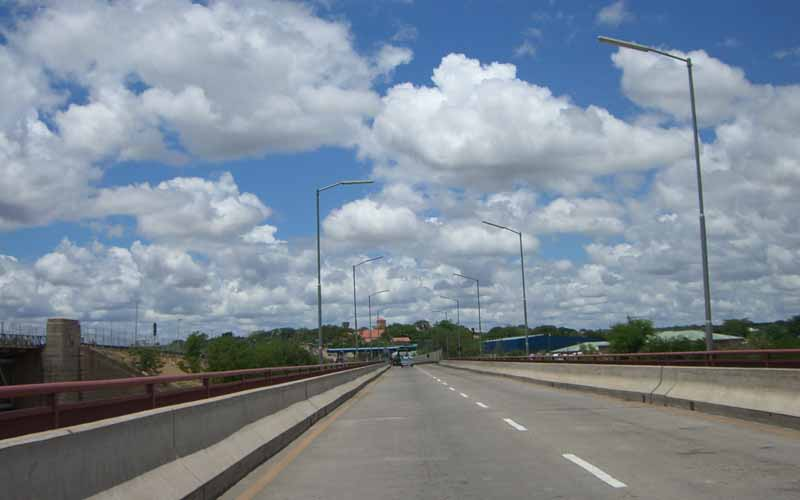
- Coordinates: 22.2244°S 29.9865°E
- Carries: Road
- Crosses: Limpopo River
- Locale: between Musina in South Africa and Beitbridge in Zimbabwe

History
- Construction end: 1995
- Opened: 1995

Location
- Interactive map of Alfred Beit Road Bridge

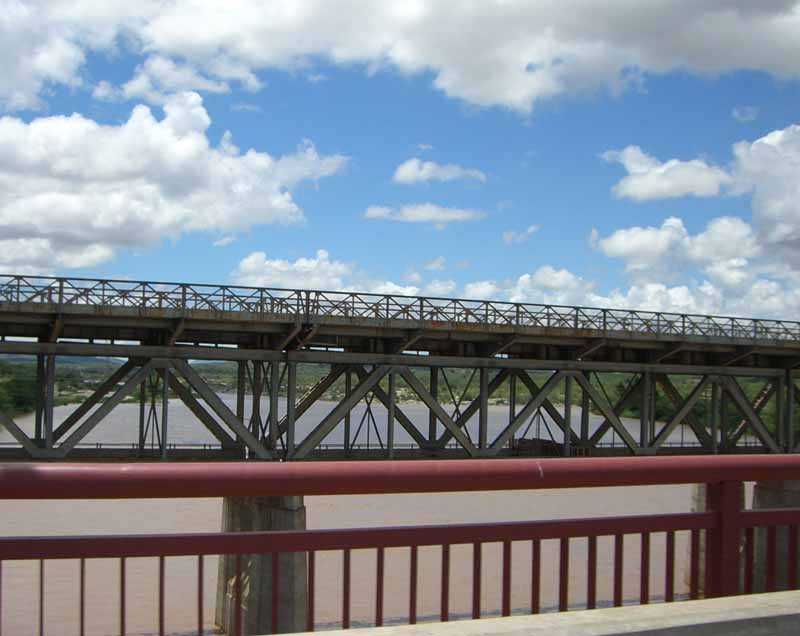
The Old Alfred Beit Bridge (in the background)

The Alfred Beit Road Bridge is a road bridge crossing the Limpopo River between Musina in South Africa and Beitbridge in Zimbabwe.

== History ==
The original Alfred Beit Bridge, which now only carries rail traffic, was completed in 1929 by Dorman Long. Named after Alfred Beit, the gold and diamond magnate, it cost $600,000 and was opened by the Earl of Athlone on 31 August 1929.

The new road bridge, constructed in 1995 parallel to the old bridge, accommodates far heavier traffic than the old bridge could take. It was built by Murray & Roberts on behalf of New Limpopo Bridge Ltd, which now operates the bridge.

== See also ==
- List of international bridges
