= Econet Global =

Zimbabwean telecommunications group headquartered in South Africa

Econet
- Slogan: Inspired to change your world!
- Type: Private
- Traded as: ZSE: ECO (Zimbabwe subsidiary only)
- Industry: Conglomerate
- Founded: 1993; 33 years ago
- Headquarters: Johannesburg, South Africa
- Area served: Africa; Europe; South America; East Asia; Australasia
- Key people: Strive Masiyiwa (Group Founder & Executive Chairman); Hardy Pemhiwa (Group Managing Director & CEO)
- Products: Telecommunications; Internet services; Solar energy; E-commerce; Education; Renewable energy; Banking
- Revenue: ▲US$3 billion (2011)
- Number of employees: 2209 (2023)
- Website: www.econetafrica.com

Econet, officially known as Econet Group, is a diversified telecommunications group with operations and investments in Africa, Europe, South America and the East Asia Pacific Rim, offering products and services in the core areas of mobile and fixed telephony services, broadband, satellite, optical fiber networks and mobile payment.

The group's subsidiaries include Econet Wireless, Cassava Technologies and Cassava Smartech.

== History ==
Econet was created in 1993 in Zimbabwe by Strive Masiyiwa. Initially it was meant to be called "Enhanced Communications Network" but was later abbreviated to Econet.

In 1998, Econet was granted a telephony licence, at a time when 70% of the country inhabitants had never heard a ringtone.

In 2005, Econet developed a mobile payment system to help NGOs make cash transfers to refugees after the Burundi war. The model was extended and integrated in Econet's technology, along with a credit solution. EcoCash was officially launched in 2011 and is operated by Econet Enterprises. Within 18 months of its launch, 31% of Zimbabwe's adult population registered to the service. By November 2017, the service had over 6.7 million registered users, accounting for 80% of adult Zimbabweans or 52% of all citizens.

In February 2013, Econet acquired a controlling interest in the then TN Bank Zimbabwe, one of the local commercial banks in Zimbabwe, and renamed it Steward Bank. The bank, whose shares were previously listed on the Zimbabwe Stock Exchange (ZSE), were delisted when it became a wholly owned subsidiary of Econet.

In October 2014, Econet acquired VimpelCom's Telecel in Burundi (U-COM) and Telecel in the Central African Republic (Telecel RCA) for $65 million.

In 2014, the listed Econet Wireless Zimbabwe announced a 14.7% drop in annual profits, from $140 million down to $119 million. In October 2015, due to dropping profits, following a state regulator-enforced tariff reduction, the company announced a 100-employee layoff to cope with the losses. In 2015, due to increasing losses, the group imposed a 20 percent salary cut to its employees in Zimbabwe, and negotiated a 15 percent discount with its suppliers, even though its service EcoCash continues to prosper in the country. In June 2015, despite the economic turmoil, the company distributed $15 million in dividends to shareholders.

== The group ==
Econet is a privately owned group and is not listed on any stock exchange. One of its subsidiaries, Econet Wireless Zimbabwe, is listed on the Zimbabwe Stock Exchange (ZSE) and its activities are confined only to the Zimbabwe market. The group is controlled by its founder, Strive Masiyiwa, and is headquartered in Johannesburg, South Africa. The holding company of the Econet Group, Econet Global Ltd, is registered in Mauritius.

== Subsidiaries ==
- Econet Wireless Zimbabwe
- Econet Wireless South Africa
- Econet Telecom Lesotho
- Mascom Botswana
- Econet Leo (Burundi)
- Cassava Technologies: Liquid Intelligent Technologies, ZOL, Transaction Payment Solutions, Africa Data Centres, Sasai Fintech, Cassava Remit, Vaya Technologies, Distributed Power Technologies
- Cassava Smartech:
  - TN Cyber-Tech Bank formerly Steward Bank - a Zimbabwean commercial bank
  - EcoCash - A Zimbabwean money transfer/ payment service which provides a savings account, international transfers, banking services, payroll services, and became a solution to pay for public transportation in October 2012. Since March 2013, EcoCash is also available as a payment solution for retailers in Zimbabwe
  - Ownai - a Zimbabwean e-commerce service.
  - EcoFarmer, EcoSure and Moovah - Zimbabwean mobile-phone-based insurance service providers
  - Ruzivo Digital Learning - a Zimbabwean e-learning service that is zero-rated
