= Wanjiku Mugane =

Kenyan businesswoman

Wanjikū Mūgane
- Born: 1964 (age 61–62); Kenya
- Citizenship: Kenya
- Education: Georgetown University (Master of Laws); University of Nairobi (Bachelor of Laws); Kenya School of Law (Diploma in Legal Practice)
- Occupations: Lawyer & Business Executive
- Years active: 1998–present
- Known for: Investment banking
- Title: Managing Director; Fedha Connect Limited

Caroline Wanjikū Mūgane is an attorney and investment banker in Kenya, the largest economy in the East African Community. She is the managing director of Fedha Connect Limited, a company that raises capital for businesses in agribusiness, real estate, oil and gas. She is a member of the board of directors of Kenya Airways, the national airline. She has previously served on the boards of Equity Bank, East African Breweries, and Standard Securities.

== Work history ==
Following her graduation from Georgetown Law School, she worked with SG Warburg in London and Johannesburg. In 1998, she and a partner founded First Africa Capital, a finance advisory company based in Nairobi, with offices in Johannesburg and London. In 2006, Standard Chartered Kenya acquired 25% shareholding in First Africa, where Ms. Mūgane served as the chief executive officer. In 2009, Standard Chartered acquired 100% shareholding in First Africa, renaming the company Standard Chartered Securities (SCS). Ms. Wanjikū Mūgane served as the CEO at SCS from 2006 until Standard Chartered Bank closed the subsidiary in 2013. In 2001, at the age of 37, she was appointed as a non-executive director of East African Breweries, serving in that capacity until she resigned in 2009. For a number of years prior to 2007, Ms. Wanjikū Mūgane served as a non-executive director of Equity Bank.
