= Post Office Savings Bank =

Post Office Savings Bank is a name used by postal savings systems in several countries, including:

- New Zealand, later renamed the PostBank
- United Kingdom, later renamed the National Savings and Investments
- Singapore, later renamed POSB Bank
- Kenya, also known as the Kenya Post Office Savings Bank
- Austra, also known as the Österreichische Postsparkasse
- Zimbabwe, later renamed the People's Own Savings Bank

Note that some of these institutions are no longer affiliated with a postal service, often as a result of privatization.
