= ZB Bank Limited =

Commercial bank in Zimbabwe

ZB Financial Holdings
- Type: Private
- Industry: Financial services
- Founded: 1951; 75 years ago
- Headquarters: Harare, Zimbabwe
- Key people: Charity Manyeruke (chairman Ronald Mutandagayi (managing director)
- Products: Loans, savings, checking, investments, debit cards, credit cards, mortgages
- Revenue: ▲Aftertax ZW$433.6 million (2019)
- Total assets: ZW$3 532.5 million (2019)
- Number of employees: 631 (2018)

ZB Bank Limited (ZBBL), also known as ZB Bank and commonly referred to as Zimbank, is a commercial bank in Zimbabwe. It is licensed by the Reserve Bank of Zimbabwe, the central bank and national banking regulator.

== Location ==
The headquarters and main branch of ZB Bank Limited are in ZB House, at 21 Natal Road, in Avondale, Harare, Harare, the capital and largest city of Zimbabwe. The geographical coordinates of the bank's headquarters are: 17°47'59.0"S, 31°02'30.0"E (Latitude:-17.799722; Longitude:31.041667).

== Business services ==
ZB Bank Limited services cover broad areas which are available either as a package or as an unbundled service. It offers consultancy, pension fund administration, actuarial, underwriting and investment management services.

== Consultancy services ==
ZB Bank Limited offers services relating to the provision of employee and group benefits. These include benefits design and advice on the impact of legislative, demographic as well as economic changes and other relevant social trends on the provision of employee and group benefits.

== Secretarial services ==
ZB Bank Limited offers administration services to all types of pension funds and group life assurance arrangements. These services include the provision of the following:

- Database management (from single or multiple payroll points)
- Accounting services
- Benefits settlement
- Reporting on administration and financial performance
- Compliance management
- Actuarial assessments
- Actuarial services

== Overview ==
ZBBL is the flagship of ZB Financial Holdings Limited, a large Zimbabwean financial services provider whose shares are traded on the Zimbabwe Stock Exchange under the symbol ZBFH.

As of December 2016, ZBBL's total assets were US$439.3 million, with shareholders' equity of US$89.43 million.

== Branch network ==
As of April 2016, ZBBL maintained a network of 49 branches and 10 agencies across Zimbabwe as listed in the 2016 Annual Report.

== ZimBank lottery ==
In January 2000, Fallot Chawaua, the Master of Ceremonies of a promotional lottery organised by the Zimbabwe Banking Corporation, announced that Robert Mugabe had won the Z$100,000 first prize jackpot. The lottery was open to all clients who had kept Z$5,000 or more in their ZimBank accounts.

== History ==
ZBBL's origins can be traced to 1951. Ten years later, the financial services organisation from which the bank originated had grown to nine branches countrywide. That organisation was sold to the Netherlands Bank of Rhodesia in 1961. In 1972, the company changed its name to Rhodesia Banking Corporation, and then to Rhobank in 1979. Following the purchase of majority shareholding by the government, the company changed its name to the Zimbabwe Banking Corporation in 1981.

In 1989, the company was restructured under one holding company, Zimbabwe Financial Holdings Limited. This allowed the bank to operate as a stand-alone subsidiary of a larger financial conglomerate that also owned other non-banking financial services subsidiaries. The acquisition of other subsidiaries over the years allowed the Group to offer a wide range of services which include commercial and merchant banking, hire purchase and leasing, as well as trust and executor services.

On 30 October 2006, the Group adopted a new brand and formally changed its name to ZB Financial Holdings Limited. This change coincided with the merger with former Intermarket Holdings. These new subsidiaries included a bank, two insurance companies and a building society. All subsidiaries adopted the ZB brand across the board.

In June 2014, the financial group merged ZB Bank Limited with ZB Building Society, to meet new capital requirements by the Reserve Bank of Zimbabwe.

== ZB Reinsurance ==
ZB Reinsurance Limited (ZBRe) is the reinsurance arm of ZBFH, offering several reinsurance services.

Established as Intermarket Reinsurance Limited in a joint venture between Hollandia Reinsurance of South Africa and Intermarket Holdings Limited in 1997; the company was renamed ZB Reinsurance subsequent to the acquisition of a majority shareholding in IHL by ZB Financial Holdings Group (ZBFH) in 2006.

ZBRe provides reinsurance services to local and regional insurance companies, reinsurers, medical aid societies as well as special type clients/consortiums.

== Board of directors ==
- Charity Manyeruke: DPhil, MSc, BSc. (chair)
- Peter Baka Nyoni: MBA, MA, BA, Adv. Dip in Theology
- Ronald Mutandagayi: B.Acc, MBL, chartered accountant (CEO)
- Fanuel Kapanje: B.Acc, B.Compt, chartered accountant
- Olatunde Akerele: LLB, MBA (Finance)
- Terekuona Sydney Bvurere: B.Acc.
- Pamela Chiromo: B.Compt, ACCA, MBA
- Jacob Mutevedzi: LLB
- Alexio Zambezi Mangwiro: BSc Public Health

== Shareholding ==
The shareholding in ZB Financial Holdings Limited, the holding company of the bank, is as illustrated in the table below:

ZB Financial Holdings Limited stock ownership
Rank	Name of owner	Percentage ownership
1	National Social Security Authority of Zimbabwe	37.79
2	Transnational Holdings Limited	21.44
3	ZB Financial Holdings Limited	10.08
4	Old Mutual Life Assurance of Zimbabwe Limited	5.50
5	Mashonaland Holdings Limited	3.01
6	Finhold Group Staff Trust	3.01
7	Government of Zimbabwe	2.07
8	LHG Malta Holdings Limited	1.77
9	Guramatunhu Family Trust	1.50
10	Ministry of Finance	1.15
11	Others	12.38
	Total	100.00

== ZB Financial Group ==
The subsidiaries of ZB Financial Holdings Limited include the following:

ZB Financial Holdings Limited subsidiaries
Rank	Name of owner	Percentage ownership	Notes
1	ZB Bank Limited	100.00	Commercial bank
2	ZB Building Society	75.33	Building society
3	ZB Transfer Secretaries	100.00	Transfer secretaries
4	ZB Capital Private Limited	100.00	Private capital
5	ZB Reinsurance Limited	100.00	Reinsurance
6	ZB Life Assurance Limited	64.00	Life insurance
7	ZB Associated Services Private Limited	100.00	Security services
8	Mashonaland Holdings Limited	34.72	Investments
9	Credit Insurance Zimbabwe Limited	42.10	Credit insurance
10	Cell Holdings Private Limited	33.32	Short-term insurance

== See also ==
- List of banks in Zimbabwe
- Reserve Bank of Zimbabwe
- Economy of Zimbabwe
