= Standard Chartered Zambia =

Coordinates: 15°24′33″S 28°16′48″E

Standard Chartered Bank Zambia
- Type: Public
- Traded as: LUSE: SCBL
- Industry: Financial services
- Founded: January 1, 1906; 120 years ago
- Headquarters: Lusaka, Zambia
- Key people: Dr Caleb M Fundanga; Chairman; Sonny Zulu; Managing Director & CEO
- Products: Loans, Checking, Savings, Investments, Debit Cards
- Revenue: ▲ZMW:1,322.3 million (US75.8 million) (2021)
- Net income: ▲ZMW: 355.9 million (US20.4 million) (2021)
- Total assets: ▼ZMW: 13,272.7 million (US761.6 million) (2021)
- Total equity: ▲ZMW: 1,154.0 million (US66.2 million) (2021)
- Number of employees: 706 (2017)
- Parent: Standard Chartered
- Website: www.sc.com/zm/

Standard Chartered Zambia, officially Standard Chartered Bank Zambia Plc, commonly known as is a Stanchart Zambia, is a commercial bank in Zambia and a subsidiary of Standard Chartered. It is licensed by the Bank of Zambia, the central bank and national banking regulator.

The bank serves large corporate clients, upscale retail customers and medium to large business enterprises. It is one of the largest commercial banks in Zambia, by assets. As of 31 December 2017, the total asset valuation of the bank was ZMW:8.851 billion (US$893.8 million), with shareholders' equity of ZMW:873.5 million (US$88.2 million).

Stanchart Zambia in partnership with BongoHive runs a programme for female-led and founded businesses called Standard Chartered Women in Technology. This program won the Best Tech-For-Women Initiative award at The Techtrends Zambia Awards 2021.

== History ==
The bank was established in 1906. The shares of stock of Stanchart Zambia are listed on the Lusaka Stock Exchange (LUSE), where they trade under the symbol: SCBL.

== Ownership ==
Stanchart Zambia is a subsidiary of the Standard Chartered Bank, an International financial services conglomerate, headquartered in London in the United Kingdom, with operations in more than sixty countries and a network of over 1,700 branches, employing in excess of 86,000 people. As of December 2017, the shares of stock of Standard Chartered Bank Zambia Limited was owned by the following entities.

Standard Chartered Zambia stock ownership
Rank	Name of Owner	Percentage Ownership
1	Standard Chartered Holdings (Africa) BV^{1}	90.00
2	Others via the Lusaka Stock Exchange	10.00
	Total	100.00

^{1 → Standard Chartered Holdings (Africa) BV (incorporated in The Netherlands) is a wholly owned subsidiary of Standard Chartered Plc.}

== Location ==
The headquarters and main branch of the bank are located at Stand No. 4642, corner of Mwaimwena Road and Addis Ababa Dr, Lusaka, in the city of Lusaka, the largest city and capital of Zambia.

== See also ==
- List of banks in Zambia
- Lusaka Stock Exchange
- Standard Chartered Bank Plc
- Standard Chartered Kenya
- Standard Chartered Tanzania
- Standard Chartered Uganda
- Standard Chartered Zimbabwe
- Economy of Zambia
