= Delta Corporation =

Zimbabwean beverage company

Delta Corporation Limited
- Type: Public company
- Traded as: ZSE: DLTA
- Industry: Beverages
- Founded: 1946
- Headquarters: Harare
- Key people: Sternford Moyo (Chairman of the Board); Matlhogonolo Mothibedi Valela (CEO); Alex Makamure (CFO)
- Products: Beer, soft drinks
- Number of employees: 4800 (2017)
- Website: https://www.delta.co.zw/

The Delta Corporation is a beer and soft drink company of Zimbabwe. The company is headquartered in Harare and is listed on the Zimbabwe Stock Exchange and its stock index, the Zimbabwe Industrial Index.

== Operations ==
Delta's brand names include:

- Beer
  - Lagers : Castle Lager, Eagle Lager, Lion Lager, Zambezi Lager, Carling Black Label, Golden Pilsener Lager, Bohlingers Lager
  - Traditional Beers: Chibuku, brewed from malted maize and sorghum, available in 1.5-liter plastic containers
- Soft drinks
  - Carbonated soft drinks: Coca-Cola, Fanta, Sprite, Sparletta, Schweppes
  - Non-Carbonated soft drinks: Mr. Juicy fruit drinks and Mahewu sorghum drink

Cultural sponsorship

- Delta promotes its brands through cultural activities including the Jikinya Dance Festival, the Chibuku Neshamwari Traditional Dance Festival and the Chibuku Road to Fame competition which is similar to reality tv shows such as American Idol and the Gulder Ultimate Search in Nigeria, sponsored by Nigerian Breweries.They also host the Lion Lager campus nights meant for university students and Lion lager beer festival.

== Production sites ==
Delta has two lager breweries, one in Southerton in Harare and Belmont in Bulawayo.

There are 14 Sorghum breweries across Zimbabwe to produce Chibuku which has a short shelf-life and consequently needs to be produced closer to the market. Additional investments were of USD 12 million made at the Chibuku brewery in Chitungwiza, to increase annual production to 1,8 million hectoliters.

A maltings plant was built in Kwe-kwe to produce barley malt from locally grown barley. A smaller sorghum maltings plant in Harare was taken over from the municipality to produce sorghum malt for the Chibuku brand.
