= Standard Chartered Tanzania =

Standard Chartered Bank Tanzania
- Company type: Subsidiary
- Industry: Financial services
- Founded: 1917; 109 years ago
- Headquarters: Dar es Salaam, Tanzania
- Products: Loans, Checking, Savings, Investments, Debit Cards
- Total assets: US$793.1 million (TZS:1.24 trillion) (2011)
- Number of employees: 337 (2011)
- Parent: Standard Chartered Bank
- Website: www.sc.com/tz

Standard Chartered Tanzania, whose official name is Standard Chartered Bank Tanzania Limited, but is often referred to as Stanchart Tanzania, is a commercial bank in Tanzania, and is a wholly owned subsidiary of Standard Chartered. It is one of the banks licensed by the Bank of Tanzania, the national banking regulator.

The bank serves retail customers, corporate customer, and medium to large business enterprises. As of December 2011, it was the fifth-largest commercial bank in Tanzania, by assets, with an estimated asset base of US$793.1 million (TZS:1.24 trillion).

== History ==
The bank was established in 1911. In 1967 its assets were nationalized, but was returned to its current owners in 1992. Stanchart Tanzania focuses on the following banking sectors: (a) agriculture (b) trading and (c) manufacturing. It also maintains a department solely devoted to small-to-medium enterprises (SMEs).

== Ownership ==
Stanchart Tanzania is a subsidiary of the Standard Chartered Bank Group, an International financial services conglomerate, headquartered in London in the United Kingdom, with operations in more than seventy countries and a network of over 1,700 branches, employing in excess of 73,000 people. The stock of the Standard Chartered Bank Group is listed on the London Stock Exchange, the National Stock Exchange of India and the Hong Kong Stock Exchange.

== Branch Network ==
As of December 2011, Standard Chartered Bank Tanzania operates a network of seven (7) branches, in the following locations and controls a network of eight (8) Automated Teller Machines (ATMs):

1. Main Branch - International House Building, Shaaban Robert Street at Garden Avenue, Dar es Salaam
2. NIC Branch - NIC Life House Building, Sokoine Drive at Ohio Street, Dar es Salaam
3. Shoppers Plaza Branch - Shoppers Plaza Building, Mikocheni, Old Bagamoyo Road, Dar es Salaam
4. Kariakoo Branch - Narung’ombe Street, Kariakoo, Dar es Salaam
5. Mwanza Branch - Chama Cha Mapinduzi Building, Makongoro Road, Mwanza
6. Moshi Branch - 98 Rindi Lane Road, Moshi
7. Arusha Branch - Sykes Building, Goliondo Road, Arusha

== See also ==
- List of banks in Tanzania
- List of banks in Africa
- Bank of Tanzania
- Standard Chartered Bank
  - Standard Chartered Kenya
  - Standard Chartered Uganda
  - Standard Chartered Zambia
  - Standard Chartered Zimbabwe
- Economy of Tanzania
