= CFX Bank =

Commercial bank in Zimbabwe

- Type: Public: ZSE: INTERFIN
- Industry: Financial services
- Founded: 2006
- Headquarters: Harare, Zimbabwe
- Products: Loans, savings, checking, investments, debit cards, credit cards, mortgages
- Website: www.cfxbank.co.zw

CFX Bank, whose full name is CFX Bank Limited, was a commercial bank in Zimbabwe. It was one of the licensed commercial banks in the country.

== History ==
The bank was founded in 2006, as a 100% subsidiary of CFX Financial Services Limited, its holding company, whose shares trade on the Zimbabwe Stock Exchange. The bank has two affiliated companies: CFX Asset Management and CFX Merchant Bank, both of which are also 100% owned by the holding company. In 2009, as a result of changes in Zimbabwean banking laws, Interfin Holdings Limited, acquired a controlling interest in CFX Financial Services. Subsequently, the holding company was renamed Interfin Financial Services Limited, to reflect the new ownership. The trading symbol for the new bank holding company is INTERFIN. The Government of Zimbabwe gave formal approval of the takeover of CFX Bank by Interfin. The Reserve Bank of Zimbabwe has also signaled its approval of the merger of the two institutions.

== Ownership ==
CFX Bank was a publicly traded company. The shares of stock of its holding company, Interfin Financial Services Limited are listed on the Zimbabwe Stock Exchange, where they trade under the symbol INTERFIN. An ownership dispute exists, with the former director of ENG Capital Group claiming that assets were illegally acquired by CFX Bank.

The five largest shareholders of record in INTERFIN and thus CFX Bank are:

Rank	Name of owner	Percentage ownership
1	Interfin Holdings Limited	32.41
2	Savanna Tobacco Limited	19.10
3	National Social Security Authority of Zimbabwe	17.31
4	Msasa Nominees (Pty) Limited	06.00
5	AFS	04.99
6	Others	20.19
	Total	100.00

== See also ==
- List of banks in Zimbabwe
- Economy of Zimbabwe
