= Time Bank Zimbabwe =

Time Bank of Zimbabwe
- Company type: Private
- Industry: Financial services
- Headquarters: Harare, Zimbabwe
- Key people: Chris Takura Tande; Managing Director
- Products: Loans, Savings, Checking, Investments, Debit Cards, Credit Cards, Mortgages

Time Bank Zimbabwe Limited, also referred to as Time Bank Zimbabwe, but commonly known as Time Bank, is commercial bank in Zimbabwe. It is one of the seventeen licensed commercial banks in the country.

== Overview ==
Time Bank is a small financial services provider in Zimbabwe. As of February 2011, the bank's total asset valuation is not publicly known. The shareholder's equity in the bank is estimated at US$12.5 million, the minimum capital requirement for a commercial bank in Zimbabwe, effective December 2010. Prior to 2004, the bank was primarily a retail bank. Following its re-opening in 2011, Time Bank will focus on investment banking.

== History ==
The bank was founded prior to 2004. That year, it was closed down by the Reserve Bank of Zimbabwe (RBZ), the national banking regulator. The shareholders and management of the bank appealed that decision and the courts reversed it in 2009. The bank then successfully applied for reinstatement of its banking license. Time bank is scheduled to resume full banking activities in March 2011, with two retail branches in Harare, the capital of Zimbabwe and the country's largest city.

== Ownership ==
The shares of stock of Time Bank are privately owned. Detailed shareholding in the bank is not publicly available.

== Branch network ==
As of February 2011, the bank branches are Main Branch at Burrough House, Harare, and Airport Branch at Harare International Airport, Harare.

== See also ==
- List of banks in Zimbabwe
- Reserve Bank of Zimbabwe
- Economy of Zimbabwe
