= Allied Bank Zimbabwe Limited =

- Company type: Private
- Industry: Financial services
- Founded: 2005
- Defunct: 8 January 2015
- Headquarters: Harare, Zimbabwe
- Key people: Florence Gowora (Chief Executive Officer)
- Products: Loans, Transaction accounts, Savings, Investments, Debit Cards
- Total assets: US$40 million (H1:2012)
- Number of employees: 304 (2011)
- Website: www.zabg.co.zw

Allied Bank, was a commercial bank in Zimbabwe that closed in 2015. The bank regulator cancelled its license on 8 January 2015 after determining that the bank was "no longer in a safe and sound condition, grossly undercapitalised and facing chronic liquidity challenges"

The bank was a small financial services provider in Zimbabwe, serving large corporations, small-to-medium enterprises (SMEs), as well as individuals. As of June 2012, its total asset valuation was quoted at US$40 million. At that time its shareholder's equity was estimated at US$18 million.

== History ==
Allied Bank was established in 2005 as Zimbabwe Allied Banking Group (ZABG). At that time, the assets and some of the liabilities of Barbican Bank Limited, Trust Banking Corporation and Royal Bank Zimbabwe were merged to form ZABG. The three banks were in financial distress at the time. In September 2010, the RBZ reversed itself and re-issued the commercial banking licenses of the three banks that had been closed. ZABG also retained its banking license.

In February 2013, ZABG rebranded to the Allied Bank name.

In January 2015 the bank had its licence cancelled by the Reserve Bank of Zimbabwe after it was found to be in an unsafe financial position.

== Ownership ==
Prior to its closure the shares of stock of Allied Bank were privately held by Allied Fund of Mauritius (75%) and Trebor & Khays of Zimbabwe (25%)

== Branch Network ==
As of October 2013, ZABG maintained its headquarters on the 8th Floor, ZB Life Towers, Sam Nujoma Street at Jason Moyo Avenue, in Harare, Zimbabwe's capital and largest city. As of December 2011, the bank had maintained 22 networked branches in all parts of the country. At the time, the bank's customers exceeded 50,000.

== See also ==
- List of banks in Zimbabwe
- List of banks in Africa
- Reserve Bank of Zimbabwe
- Economy of Zimbabwe
- Obert Mpofu
