= Royal Bank Zimbabwe =

- Company type: Private
- Industry: Financial services
- Founded: 2001
- Defunct: 2012
- Fate: Liquidation
- Headquarters: Harare, Zimbabwe
- Key people: Peter Simhanga Chikumba; Chairman; Jeffrey Mzwimbi; Executive Director
- Products: Loans, Savings, Checking, Investments, Debit Cards, Credit Cards, Mortgages
- Website: Homepage

Royal Bank Zimbabwe, commonly referred to as Royal Bank, was a licensed commercial bank in that formerly operated in Zimbabwe. It operated between 2001 and 2012, when it was shut down by its Board due to accumulated losses, liquidity challenges and high level of non-performing loans.

Royal Bank was a small privately owned financial institution and financial services provider in Zimbabwe. As of June 2010, the shareholder's equity in the bank was estimated at US$12.5 million, the minimum capital requirement for a commercial bank in Zimbabwe.

== History ==
The bank was founded in 2001. In 2004, the Reserve Bank of Zimbabwe (RBZ), the national banking regulator, closed the bank down, together with Barbican Bank and Trust Banking Corporation. The assets of the three shuttered banks, were merged, to form Zimbabwe Allied Banking Group (ZABG).

In September 2010, the RBZ reversed its decision and reissued the commercial banking licences of the three banks that had been closed. Royal Bank reopened in February 2011, after six years of enforced closure. ZABG also retained its banking licence. As of December 2010, the number of licensed commercial banks in Zimbabwe, was nineteen.

In March 2012, Zimbabwean media reported that Commercial Bank of Africa Group, a Kenyan financial services conglomerate, had agreed to acquire a 62% stake in Royal Bank of Zimbabwe. However, both parties failed to finalise on the deal within the allowed regulatory time frame thus the deal lapsed.

=== Closure and liquidation ===
On July 27, 2012, the board of directors of Royal Bank Zimbabwe resolved to surrender the institution's banking licence to the Reserve Bank of Zimbabwe and shut down its business in the country. This followed the determination by the Reserve Bank of Zimbabwe that Royal Bank was no longer in a "safe and sound financial condition". The board of directors' resolution was due to under capitalization of the bank, accumulated of losses, liquidity challenges and high level of non-performing loans. The central bank is in the process of liquidating Royal bank and reimbursing depositor funds.

== Branch network ==
As of June 2012, Royal Bank maintained a network of branches at the following locations:

1. Main Branch - 8th Floor Takura House, 67 Kwame Nkrumah Avenue, Harare
2. Karoi Branch - 9 Harris Street, Karoi
3. Gwanda Branch - 6 Fourth Avenue & Lawley Street, Gwanda
4. Nyanga Branch - 18 Rochdale Road, Nyanga
5. Chegutu Branch - 110 Queen Street, Chegutu
6. Lobengula Branch - 9 & 10 Lobengula Mall, 6th Avenue Extension, Bulawayo
7. Hwange Branch - Coronation Drive, Hwange
8. Rusape Branch - 13 Robert Mugabe Street, Rusape
9. Kadoma Branch - 156 Herbert Chitepo Street & Mukwati Street, Kadoma
10. Ascot Branch - Shop 7 Ascot Complex, Bulawayo
11. Chipinge Branch - 75 Main Street, Chipinge
12. Marondera Branch - 253 Shop 2, The Green, Marondera
13. Kwekwe Branch - 35 North Mandela Way at 3rd Street, Kwekwe

== See also ==
- List of banks in Zimbabwe
- Reserve Bank of Zimbabwe
- Economy of Zimbabwe
