= Standard Chartered Zimbabwe =

Zimbabwean subsidiary of Standard Chartered

Coordinates: 17°49′43″S 31°03′02″E

Standard Chartered Bank Zimbabwe
- Type: Private company
- Industry: Financial services
- Founded: 1892; 134 years ago
- Headquarters: Africa Unity Square Building; Harare, Zimbabwe
- Key people: L T Manasta; Chairman; Ralph Watungwa; Managing Director & CEO
- Products: Loans, checking, savings, investments, debit cards
- Revenue: ▲ Aftertax: US$13.33 million (2017)
- Total assets: US$815.8 million (2017)
- Number of employees: 582 (2018)
- Parent: FBC Holdings; (2024–present)
- Website: www.sc.com/zw

Standard Chartered Zimbabwe (officially Standard Chartered Bank Zimbabwe Limited) is a commercial bank in Zimbabwe and a subsidiary of FBC Holdings since 2024. It is licensed by the Reserve Bank of Zimbabwe, the central bank and national banking regulator.

== Overview ==
Stanchart Zimbabwe is a large commercial bank, serving large corporate clients, upscale retail customers and medium to large business enterprises. As of December 2017, it had total assets that were valued at US$815.8 million with shareholders equity of US$84.6 million.

The headquarters and main branch of Standard Chartered Zimbabwe are located on the First Floor of the Africa Unity Square Building, at 68 Nelson Mandela Avenue, in downtown Harare, the capital and largest city of Zimbabwe. As of May 2018, Standard Chartered Bank Zimbabwe employed 582 personnel.

== History ==
Standard Chartered Bank Zimbabwe is the oldest financial institution in Zimbabwe, having been established as Standard Bank in 1892. The current bank was created when Standard Bank merged with Chartered Bank in 1969. According to the bank's website, Stanchart Zimbabwe served in excess of 90,000 account holders, as of May 2018.

Until 2024, Stanchart Zimbabwe was a subsidiary of Standard Chartered Bank Group, a London-based international financial services conglomerate with operations in more than sixty countries, having a network of more than 1,700 branches and 86,000 people. The company shares of Standard Chartered Zimbabwe were owned by three corporate entities as illustrated in the table below, according to the bank's website.

Stanchart Zimbabwe stock ownership
Rank	Name of Owner	Percentage Ownership
1	Standard Chartered Holdings Africa	88.00
2	Standard Chartered Bank Plc	09.00
3	Standard Chartered Holdings International	03.00
	Total	100.00

In May 2024, it was announced that FBC Holdings had completed its acquisition of the bank.

== Branches ==
As of May 2021, the bank maintained branches at the following locations:

1. Africa Unity Square Branch: Corner of Sam Nujoma Street and Nelson Mandela Avenue, Harare Main Branch
2. Bulawayo Branch: Corner of 8th Avenue and Fife Street, Bulawayo

== Governance ==
As of December 2017, the chairman of the seven-person board of directors was L T Manasta, one of the non-Executive Directors. Ralph Watungwa serves as the bank's managing director and chief executive officer.

== See also ==
- List of banks in Zimbabwe
- Standard Chartered Kenya
- Standard Chartered Bank
- Standard Chartered Tanzania
- Standard Chartered Uganda
- Standard Chartered Zambia
- Zimbabwe Stock Exchange
- Economy of Zimbabwe
