= New Limpopo Bridge =

Company of Zimbabwe

New Limpopo Bridge (Pvt) Ltd.
- Type: Private
- Headquarters: Zimbabwe
- Subsidiaries: NLPI

New Limpopo Bridge (Pvt) Ltd., is a private company, incorporated and registered in Zimbabwe, and is a subsidiary of NLPI Ltd, an investment holding company whose main investment focus is infrastructure projects in Africa. Under a build–operate–transfer (BOT) concession agreement—one of the first BOT schemes in Africa—New Limpopo Bridge (Pvt) Ltd constructed the Alfred Beit Road Bridge over the Limpopo River between Musina, South Africa, and Beitbridge, Zimbabwe, in 1994.

New Limpopo Bridge Ltd recovered costs by charging user tolls, and upon the expiry of the twenty-year BOT agreement in mid-2014, the Zimbabwean government took ownership of the bridge.
