= Colcom Foods =

Meat-processing company in Zimbabwe

- Traded as: ZSE: COLC
- Industry: Food
- Headquarters: Harare, Zimbabwe
- Products: Meat, pork, beef, chicken
- Website: www.colcomfoods.com

Colcom Foods Limited is a long established meat-processing company in Zimbabwe. Products under the Colcom brand include: fresh pork, hams, bacons, fresh and cooked sausages, pies, cooked cold meat, and polonies. It also has Colcom country style boerewors, Colcom chipolata sausages, Colcom park lion chops, and Colcom boneless rib burgers. Colcom is Zimbabwe's leading pork producer, with a joint venture (Associated Meat Packers (AMP)) producing beef products. Colcom Foods is part of the Colcom Holdings Group, which in turn is majority owned by Innscor Africa. Both Innscor and Colcom are listed on the Zimbabwe Stock Exchange. In 2017 Innscor announced its intention to delist Colcom and offered to exchange Colcom shares belonging to minority shareholders for Innscor shares. Colcoms was above prior comparable period on increased volumes traded and 34 percent growth in pigs delivered. In the period under review, additional delivery of pigs allowed volume growth in carcasses and fresh pork.

== History ==
Colcom's origins are in a farmer-owned cooperative established in late 1943 in Southern Rhodesia to assist with the marketing of their pigs. The then Cold Storage Commission acted as their agents until 1961, when the Cooperative's first processing factory was built on the present site in Harare. In 1993 Colcom was successfully floated on the Zimbabwe Stock Exchange and became a publicly quoted company. Colcom supplies wholesalers and retailers nationwide and operates its own and franchised outlets, including a Training Centre at “The Colcom Kitchen”.

== Products ==
Colcom produces fresh pork, fresh and smoked ribs, ham, bacon, fresh and cooked sausages, pies, cold meats, polony and canned meats. In 2015 it reduced the size of its flagship product, the Colcom pork pie, leading to accusations from customers that the quality of the product had deteriorated. Colcom's parent company, Innscor, claimed in 2018 that Zimbabweans ate over 109,000 Colcom pork pies every day.
