= Kingdom Bank =

Kingdom Bank Africa Limited (KBAL) was a bank in Botswana established in the 1990s. It was closed down in 2015 when it was found to have become insolvent; the central bank of Botswana found that its liabilities exceeded its assets by around $17 million and withdrew its license.
