= Zimswitch =

- Company type: Subsidiary
- Industry: Financial services
- Founded: 1994; 31 years ago
- Parent: Zimswitch Technologies Private Limited

Zimswitch, operated by Zimswitch Technologies Private Limited, is a Zimbabwean third-party transaction-acquiring business launched in 1994. Zimswitch is affiliated with 19 commercial banks and two building societies, which operate a network of 2900 point-of-sale terminals and 393 automated teller machines throughout Zimbabwe.

== Background ==
ZimSwitch was established in 1994 through a partnership of six financial institutions: Beverley, Barclays, CABS, Founders Building Society (ZBBs), Stanbic and Zimbank (ZB Bank). CBZ joined in 1995, followed by Time Bank in 1997. The late Wengesai Mhuriro was the first employee of ZimSwitch, as a messenger (Sept 1994).

== Services ==
ZimSwitch offers Zimbabweans the ability to transfer up to US$10,000 with a flat transaction fee of $0.20 (plus $100 2-cent tax for every $10). It is an instant transfer, so money can be accessed faster.

== The Role of ZimSwitch ==
ZimSwitch is the sole national electronic funds switch for Zimbabwe. The company processes domestic card-based ATM and POS transactions between member financial institutions in real time online. ZimSwitch has recently enabled its member banks to process person-to-person payments through the switch using a variety of delivery channels, including mobile phones. ZimSwitch serves not only the financial institutions who are its members and users, but also provides an essential service to their customers, the Zimbabwean public. Below are some of the benefits of the ZimSwitch platform to the financial sector, business and the Zimbabwean public.

== See also ==
- eCommerce
