= Metbank =

Commercial bank in Zimbabwe

- Type: Private
- Industry: Financial services
- Founded: 1999; 27 years ago
- Headquarters: Harare, Zimbabwe
- Key people: Darlick E. Marandure (Chairman); Belmont Ndebele (Managing Director)
- Products: Loans; savings; checking; investments; debit cards; credit cards; mortgages
- Revenue: ▲US$660,288 (2016)
- Total assets: US$200.7 million (2016)
- Number of employees: 251 (2018)
- Website: www.metbank.co.zw

Metbank, formerly known as Metropolitan Bank of Zimbabwe, is a commercial bank in Zimbabwe. It is licensed by the Reserve Bank of Zimbabwe, the central bank and national banking regulator.

== Location ==
The headquarters and main branch of Metbank are located in Metropolitan House, at 3 Central Avenue, in Harare the capital and largest city of Zimbabwe. The geographical coordinates of the bank's headquarters are: 17°49'31.0"S, 31°03'02.0"E (Latitude:-17.825278; Longitude:31.050556).

== Overview ==
Metbank serves large corporations, small to medium enterprises (SMEs), as well as individuals. The bank partners with MasterCard to issue debit and credit cards. As of December 2016, Metbank was a medium-sized financial services provider, with an asset base of US$200.7 million, with shareholders' equity of US$55.9 million.

Metbank Limited has been involved with the introduction of digital banking, branchless banking, and internet banking and agency banking, while keeping the number of brick-and-mortar branches low. As of February 2018, Metbank had a network of banking agents numbering over 150, both inside and outside Zimbabwe. Many of these agents are women and youth, who otherwise would be unemployed.

== Ownership ==
According to the website of the Reserve Bank of Zimbabwe, the major shareholders in the stock of the bank include the following:

Shareholding in Metbank
Rank	Shareholder	Percentage Ownership
1	Loita Finance Holdings Limited	60.00
2	Blisford Investments Private Limited	10.00
3	Crudge Investments Private Limited	10.00
4	Metropolitan Bank Trust	7.20
5	Rhinemead Investments Private Limited	6.40
6	Knopfler Investments Private Limited	2.80
7	Equestrian Trading Private Limited	2.80
8	CAI Pension Fund	0.80
Total		100.00

== Branch network ==
as of January 2021, Metbank maintains a network of branches at the following locations:

1. Main Branch: Metropolitan House, 3 Central Avenue, Harare
2. Bulawayo Branch: Meikles Building, Corner Jason Moyo/ Leopold Takawira Bulawayo
3. Gweru Branch: Shop No. 1 & 2 Bahadaur Centre, Main Street, Gweru
4. Mutare Branch: Shop 1, Zimre Centre, Corner of Herbert Chitepo Street and 5th Street, Mutare

== Governance ==
The chairperson of the bank's board of directors is Dr. Linda Chipunza, a non-executive director. The managing director is Belmont Ndebele.

== See also ==
- List of banks in Zimbabwe
- Reserve Bank of Zimbabwe
- Economy of Zimbabwe
