= Port Alfred Airport =

- IATA: AFD; ICAO: FAPA

Summary
- Airport type: Public
- Serves: Port Alfred, Eastern Cape, South Africa
- Elevation AMSL: 272 ft / 83 m
- Coordinates: 33°33′15″S 26°52′47″E

Map
- Location of airport in Eastern Cape province Location of Eastern Cape in South Africa

Runways
Direction	Length		Surface
Direction	m	ft	Surface
	1,828	5,997

Port Alfred Airport (IATA: AFD, ICAO: FAPA) is an airport in the seaside town of Port Alfred, located in the Eastern Cape province on the southern coast of South Africa.

== Facilities ==
The airport resides at an elevation of 272 feet (83 m) above mean sea level. It has three runways, the longest of which is 1,828 metres (5,997 ft).
