= Agricultural Development Bank of Zimbabwe =

Zimbabwean commercial bank

- Company type: Parastatal
- Industry: Financial services
- Founded: 1999
- Headquarters: Harare, Zimbabwe
- Key people: Joel Mutizwa (Chairman), Francis Macheka (Group Chief Executive Officer)
- Products: Loans, Savings, Transaction accounts, Investments, Debit Cards, Credit Cards, Mortgages
- Revenue: ▼Aftertax:US$286,409 (2011)
- Total assets: US$102.8 million (2011)
- Number of employees: 1,000+ (2012)
- Website: www.agribank.co.zw

Agricultural Development Bank of Zimbabwe (ADBZ), also referred to as Agricultural Bank of Zimbabwe, but commonly known as Agribank, is a commercial bank in Zimbabwe. It is one of the commercial banks licensed by the Reserve Bank of Zimbabwe, the national banking regulator.

Agribank is middle-tier financial services provider that provides commercial, retail, corporate, and international banking services in Zimbabwe. It offers agricultural loans, in addition to other retail, advisory, treasury and investment services, including foreign currency and money transfer services. As of December 2011, the valuation of the bank's total assets was reported to be US$102.8 million, with shareholders' equity of US$15.1 million.

In 2021, Agribank rebranded to Agricultural Finance Company (AFC).

== History ==
Agricultural Development Bank of Zimbabwe was established as a commercial bank in 1999, according to the website of the Reserve Bank of Zimbabwe. Before that it was known as Agricultural Finance Corporation, which was formerly known as Land and Agricultural Bank, an institution that was established in 1925. In 2003, Agribank transformed into an agricultural development bank, with emphasis on making agricultural loans, but it kept its commercial bank license and function.

== Ownership ==
Agribank is 100% owned by the Government of Zimbabwe. The table below outlines the shareholding in the bank between the various government ministries:

Agribank Zimbabwe Stock Ownership

Rank	Name of Owner	Percentage Ownership
1	Zimbabwe Ministry of Finance	50.00
2	Zimbabwe Ministry of Agriculture	50.00
	Total	100.00

== Branches ==
The bank maintains its headquarters at Hurudza House, 14-16 Nelson Mandela Avenue, in Harare, Zimbabwe's capital. It also has 47 networked branches in all provinces of the country.

== See also ==
- List of banks in Zimbabwe
- Economy of Zimbabwe
