= Alfred Mulock Bentley =

Irish-born financier (1878–1956)

Alfred Bentley
- Born: 30 May 1878; Dublin, Ireland
- Died: 3 June 1959 (aged 81); Southern Rhodesia
- Known for: Founding the Rhodesian Stock Exchange
- Spouse: Marie Marguerite Ross
- Parent(s): Mark Cumberland Bentley and Anna Maria Mulock

Alfred Mulock Bentley (1878–1956) was an Irish-born financier who founded the Rhodesian Stock Exchange in Bulawayo in 1946. He served in the Boer War from 1899 to 1902.

Alfred was born on 30 May 1878 in Dublin, Ireland to Mark Cumberland Bentley and Anna Maria Mulock. He was the 11th child and 7th son. In 1911, he married Marie Marguerite Ross.

In 1896 Alfred Mulock Bentley set out from Ireland to explore Africa, in particular Northern & Southern Rhodesia, now known as Zambia & Zimbabwe where he was involved in setting up the first copper mines in Zambia.

In 1912, they were one of the first families to travel across the iconic Victoria Falls Bridge over the Zambezi River, to Zimbabwe where he later founded the Rhodesian Stock Exchange in Bulawayo.
