= Standard Chartered Uganda =

Commercial bank in Uganda

Standard Chartered Bank Uganda Limited
- Type: Private
- Industry: Financial services
- Founded: August 1, 1912; 114 years ago
- Headquarters: 5 Speke Road, Kampala, Uganda
- Key people: Maria Kiwanuka; Chairperson; Sanjay Rughani; CEO
- Products: Loans, checking, savings, investments, debit cards
- Revenue: ▲ Aftertax: USh72 billion (US$20.3 million) (2020)
- Total assets: USh3.8 trillion (US$1.072 billion) (2020)
- Number of employees: 600+ (2018)
- Parent: Standard Chartered
- Website: www.sc.com/ug

Standard Chartered Uganda, whose official name is Standard Chartered Bank Uganda Limited but is often referred to as Stanchart Uganda, is a commercial bank in Uganda. It is one of the banks licensed by the Bank of Uganda, the central bank and national banking regulator.

== Overview ==
Stanchart Uganda is a large bank serving large corporate clients, upscale retail customers, and medium to large business enterprises. As of December 2020, it was the third largest commercial bank in Uganda by assets, with an asset base of UGX:3.8 trillion (US$1.072 billion), with shareholders' equity of UGX:937 billion (US$264 million), behind Stanbic Bank Uganda and Centenary Bank. As of June 2013, Stanchart Uganda owned an estimated 16.2 percent of total bank assets in the country.

== History ==
Founded in August 1912, Stanchart Uganda is the oldest commercial bank in the country and has maintained a continuous banking presence in the country since its founding. In 1998, Stanchart Uganda acquired four branches of the former Uganda Cooperative Bank. As of May 2018, Stanchart Uganda had 9 branches and 29 automated teller machines and employed over 600 people.

In June 2026, the Bank of Uganda approved the sale of Standard Chartered Uganda's Wealth and Retail Banking portfolio to Absa Bank Uganda, a move initiated in October 2025 to prioritise corporate banking.

== Ownership ==
Stanchart Uganda is a wholly owned subsidiary of the Standard Chartered Bank Group, an international financial services conglomerate, headquartered in London in the United Kingdom.

== Branch network ==
As of May 2018, the bank had a network of interconnected branches at the following locations, arranged alphabetically:

1. Lugogo Branch: Forest Mall, 2-8 Lugogo Bypass Road, Lugogo, Kampala
2. Acacia Branch: Acacia Shopping Mall, Kololo, Kampala
3. City Branch - 9 William Street, Kampala
4. Jinja Branch - 2-4 Grant Road, Jinja
5. Freedom City Branch - 4010 Kampala-Entebbe Road, Namasuba, Kampala
6. Garden City Branch - Garden City Shopping Mall, 64-84 Yusuf Lule Road, Kampala
7. Speke Road Branch - 5 Speke Road, Kampala Head Office
8. Kikuubo Branch - Kikuubo Lane, Kampala
9. Village Mall Branch - Village Mall, 3 Bandali Rise, Bugolobi, Kampala

== Governance ==
As of July 2024, the chairperson of the board of directors is Maria Kiwanuka, a former minister of finance in Uganda's cabinet. The managing director is Sanjay Rughani.

== Other considerations ==
As of July 2024, Stanchart Uganda was contemplating financing (a) the Uganda government's take-over of Umeme in March 2025 (b) the construction of several high voltage transmission lines and (c) the construction of several "oil roads".

== See also ==
- List of banks in Uganda
- Banking in Uganda
- Standard Chartered Kenya
- Standard Chartered Tanzania
- Standard Chartered Zambia
- Standard Chartered Zimbabwe
- Economy of Uganda
- James Mulwana
