= Kingdom Bank (United Kingdom) =

Christian bank in the United Kingdom

Kingdom Bank Limited
- Formerly: Kingdom Banking Limited (3–30 January 2002)
- Type: Private limited company
- Industry: Financial services
- Founded: 2005
- Headquarters: Beeston, Nottingham, United Kingdom
- Area served: United Kingdom
- Products: Mortgages; Savings; Insurance
- Owner: UK charity Stewardship and a consortium of individuals.
- Website: kingdom.bank

Kingdom Bank Limited is a Christian bank in the United Kingdom. They provide deposit accounts, mortgages, and insurance brokering, with the vision of helping UK churches to grow.

== History ==
It was founded in the early 1950s by Pastor George Oldershaw as an informal fund to finance the development of churches within the Assemblies of God movement in Great Britain and Ireland. In 1954 the fund became a Registered Charity known as Assemblies of God Property Trust. The organisation saw slow but steady growth and was authorised by the Bank of England in the 1980s and subsequently by the Financial Services Authority.

On 1 January 2005 Kingdom Bank Limited was launched as a wholly owned subsidiary of the Assemblies of God Property Trust.

In May 2009, Kingdom Bank expanded its insurance business by purchasing the insurance business of Stewardship, a Christian charity. Kingdom Bank Insurance Brokering is primarily designed for Churches and Christian charities.

In September 2019, Kingdom Bank announced that the Assemblies of God Property Trust intended to allow Stewardship, with a group of Christian philanthropists, to purchase the bank. The deal was approved by the regulators and confirmed in March 2020.

== See also ==
- List of banks in the United Kingdom
