= Standard Chartered Kenya =

Commercial bank in Kenya

Standard Chartered Bank Kenya
- Type: Public
- Traded as: KN: SCBK
- Industry: Financial services
- Founded: 1910
- Headquarters: Nairobi, Kenya
- Key people: Patrick Obath (chairperson), Kariuki Ngari (chief executive officer)
- Products: Loans, transaction accounts, savings, investments, debit cards
- Revenue: ▲ Aftertax: US$108.7 million (KES: 9.26 billion) (2013)
- Total assets: US$2.539 billion (KES: 220.39 billion) (2013)
- Number of employees: 1,040+ (2011)
- Parent: Standard Chartered
- Website: www.sc.com/ke

Standard Chartered Kenya, whose official name is Standard Chartered Bank Kenya Limited, but is sometimes referred to as Stanchart Kenya, is a commercial bank in Kenya. It is a subsidiary of the British multinational financial conglomerate headquartered in London, United Kingdom, known as Standard Chartered. Stanchart Kenya is one of the banks licensed by the Central Bank of Kenya, the central bank and national banking regulator, in the largest economy in the East African Community.

Standard Chartered Kenya is a large financial services provider in Kenya. As of December 2013, the bank's total assets were valued at about US$2.539 billion (KES:220.39 billion), with shareholders' equity of about US$417.1 million (KES:36.2 billion). At that time, Standard Chartered Kenya was the 4th largest bank, by assets, out of the 43 licensed banks in the country.

== History ==
According to the website of the Central Bank of Kenya, the Standard Bank of British South Africa received its commercial banking license in 1910 to start banking operations in British East Africa. In January 1911, it opened its first two branches, one in the national capital, Nairobi, and another in the port city of Mombasa.

In 1969, the bank's name was changed to Standard Chartered Bank of Kenya when its parent company, the Standard Bank of South Africa, merged with the Chartered Bank of India, Australia and China, forming the Standard Chartered Bank. In 1987, Standard Chartered sold all its shareholding in Standard Bank of South Africa, entirely divesting from the group.

The stock of Standard Chartered Kenya was listed on the Nairobi Securities Exchange (NSE) in 1989, offering 21 million shares to the public. This was the largest single placing at the NSE at the time. As of August 2014, the bank had a network of 34 branches, 90 automated teller machines and nearly 1,700 employees.

== Ownership ==
The stock of the bank is listed on the Nairobi Stock Exchange, where it trades under the symbol: SCBK. The shareholding in the bank is summarized in the table below:

Stanchart Kenya stock ownership

Rank	Name of owner	Percentage ownership
1	Standard Chartered Group	74.00
2	32,000+ Institutional & Individual Investors on the Nairobi Stock Exchange	26.00
	Total	100.00

== Subsidiaries ==
In 2006, Standard Chartered Kenya acquired 25% shareholding in First Africa Capital, a financial services advisory company with headquarters in Nairobi and offices in London and Johannesburg, co-founded by Wanjiku Mugane, a Kenyan attorney and investment banker, who served as its CEO. In 2009, Standard Chartered acquired 100% of First Africa stock, renaming the company Standard Chartered Securities (SCS), to reflect the new ownership. Caroline Wanjiku Mugane served as the chief executive officer at SCS from 2006 until Standard Chartered Bank closed the subsidiary in 2013.

== See also ==
- Standard Chartered
- Standard Chartered Tanzania
- Standard Chartered Uganda
- Standard Chartered Zambia
- Standard Chartered Zimbabwe
- Economy of Kenya
- List of banks in Kenya
