= TM Supermarket =

Supermarket chain in Zimbabwe

TM Supermarket is a chain of supermarkets in Zimbabwe. They have branches in all cities and in most Zimbabwean towns. They are a part of the Meikles group of companies, though Pick n Pay Stores, a South African retailer, took control of 49% of TM Supermarkets. They are mostly found in Zimbabwe.
