= CBZ Bank Limited =

Zimbabwean commercial bank

- Type: Private
- Industry: Financial services
- Founded: 1980; 46 years ago
- Headquarters: Harare, Zimbabwe
- Key people: Chairman; Dr Alex Marufu Managing Director; Valeta Mthimkhulu
- Products: Retail Banking, Digital Banking, Mortgage Finance, Commercial Banking, Investment Banking, Small to Medium Enterprise (SME) Financing, Treasury Management, Lease Financing, Custodial Services
- Revenue: ▲ Aftertax: ZWG 997.2 billion (H1, 2025)
- Website: www.cbz.co.zw/banking/

CBZ Bank Limited, also CBZ Bank, is a commercial bank in Zimbabwe. It is one of the financial services institutions licensed by the Reserve Bank of Zimbabwe, the central bank and national banking regulator.

== Location ==
The headquarters and main branch of the bank are located on the 3rd Floor of Union House, at 60 Kwame Nkrumah Avenue, in Harare, the capital and largest city in Zimbabwe. The geographical coordinates of the bank's headquarters are: 17°49'40.0"S, 31°02'55.0"E (Latitude:-17.827778; Longitude:31.048611).

== Overview ==
As of June 2025, CBZ Bank is one of the largest financial institutions in Zimbabwe. The bank is the flagship subsidiary of CBZ Holdings Limited, which is listed on the Zimbabwe Stock Exchange (ZSE: CBZ). At that date, the group reported total assets of ZWG 1.76 trillion and a profit after tax of ZWG 398 billion, with CBZ Bank contributing the majority of earnings. The bank operates a network of 37 branches nationwide and offers services across retail banking, corporate banking, trade finance, treasury, mortgages, digital banking, and diaspora banking.

== History ==
The bank was founded in 1980 as the Bank of Credit and Commerce Zimbabwe Limited (BCCZL). In 1991, after the collapse of its parent, BCCI, the Government of Zimbabwe acquired full ownership to protect depositors and restructured the institution as the Commercial Bank of Zimbabwe (CBZ). Paul Tangi Mhova Mkondo was one of the main principal founders of the bank.

In 2005, CBZ Holdings Limited was created as a holding company for the group’s growing financial services operations, with CBZ Bank as its flagship subsidiary. In 2010, the bank rebranded as CBZ Bank Limited to align with the group’s identity. Since then, it has expanded into insurance, investments, and property services while modernising through digital platforms such as CBZ Touch and the Zikimall.

== Ownership ==
CBZ Bank is wholly owned by CBZ Holdings Limited, a publicly traded company on the Zimbabwe Stock Exchange.

Shareholding in CBZ Bank Group Limited
Rank	Shareholder	Percentage Ownership
1	CBZ Holdings Limited	24.58
2	Government of Zimbabwe	16.01
3	Libyan Foreign Bank	14.06
4	National Social Security Authority of Zimbabwe	11.71
5	PIM Nominees (Private) Limited	6.70
6	Old Mutual Life Association Company Zimbabwe Limited	5.45
7	Stanbic Nominees (Private) Limited–NNR	4.34
8	PIM Nominees–NNR	1.72
9	SCB Nominees	1.53
10	Stanbic Nominees (Private) Limited	1.42
11	Others	12.48
Total		100.00

== Branches ==
CBZ Bank operates a network of 37 branches across Zimbabwe, making it one of the largest branch networks in the country. Its presence covers all major cities, including Harare, Bulawayo, Mutare, Gweru, Masvingo, and Victoria Falls, as well as medium-sized towns and growth points.

In addition to its physical footprint, CBZ Bank has expanded its reach through digital banking platforms such as CBZ Touch and the Zikimall, allowing customers to access a wide range of financial services remotely. This hybrid model of physical and digital channels enables the bank to serve both urban and rural communities effectively.

== See also ==
- List of banks in Zimbabwe
- Reserve Bank of Zimbabwe
- Economy of Zimbabwe
