= Maria Kiwanuka =

Ugandan economist, businesswoman and politician (born 1955)

- Born: 12 May 1955 (age 71); Kampala, Uganda
- Citizenship: Uganda
- Education: Makerere University (Bachelor of Commerce); London Business School (Master of Business Administration)
- Occupations: Economist, politician, businesswoman
- Years active: 1984–present
- Known for: Entrepreneurship
- Title: Senior Presidential Advisor on Finance

Maria Kiwanuka (born 12 May 1955) is a Ugandan economist, businesswoman and politician who served as Minister of Finance in the Cabinet of Uganda from 27 May 2011 to 1 March 2015. Since 2015 she has been Senior Advisor to the President of Uganda on financial matters, responsible for the Bretton Woods Institutions.

== Overview ==
Prior to her appointment to cabinet, she was the managing director of Radio One and its sister station Radio Two known locally as Akaboozi FM, in Uganda, in which her family owns majority shareholding. She also served as a non-Executive board member on the board of directors of the Aga Khan Foundation (East Africa), the Nabagereka Development Trust, Nkumba University, Uganda Development Bank and Stanbic Bank Uganda Limited.

She served on the board of Stanbic Bank Uganda Limited from 2009 until 2011. After serving as the chairperson of the board of directors at United Bank for Africa Uganda Limited, for a number of years, Maria was appointed to the board of Standard Chartered Uganda in May 2021.

== Background and education ==
She was born in Kampala, the capital of Uganda on 12 May 1955. Maria Kiwanuka attended Gayaza High School, a prestigious all-girls boarding high school, located about 26 kilometres (16 mi), by road, northeast of Kampala, graduating in 1973. In 1974 she entered Makerere University, Uganda's oldest institution of higher education. She graduated in 1977 with the degree of Bachelor of Commerce (BCom). She later pursued further education at the London Business School in the United Kingdom, graduating with the degree of Master of Business Administration (MBA).

== Work experience ==
Beginning around 1980, she worked for more than ten years with the World Bank, as an Economist and Financial Analyst for the East Asian and Southern African regions. Specifically she covered projects in Burma, Malawi, Swaziland and Uganda. After she left the World Bank, she returned to her native Uganda and went into private business. Together with members of her family, she founded businesses in the areas of broadcasting, publishing, real estate and economic consulting. She has served as a financial adviser to the Nabagereka of Buganda since the early 2000s. In a cabinet reshuffle on 1 March 2015 she was dropped from Cabinet and appointed Senior Financial Advisor to the President.

She has over the years served as a non-executive director of the board at Stanbic Bank Uganda Limited, the Agha Khan Foundation, Nkumba University and Uganda Development Bank. Since leaving the Ugandan cabinet in 2015, she has served as chairperson of the board of United Bank for Africa Uganda Limited. As of May 2022, she sits on the board of Standard Chartered Uganda, as a non-executive member, since May 2021. In May 2022, Maria Kiwanuka was appointed chairperson of the board at Airtel Mobile Commerce Uganda Limited (AMCUL), an affiliate of Airtel Uganda and the provider of Airtel Money Uganda.

== Personal details ==
She is married to Mohan Kiwanuka, the managing director of Oscar Industries Limited. In 2007, four years prior to her being appointed Finance Minister, her husband was listed as one of the wealthiest people in Uganda. On September, her last born son Nsereko Kyamukungubya Kiwanuka also called Kyamu, former worker at DFCU Uganda and later relocated to US for further studies, was found dead in his apartment where he was living alone.

== See also ==
- KCCA
- Uganda Parliament
- Uganda Cabinet
- Uganda Economy
