= Stapleford, Zimbabwe =

Village in Zimbabwe

Coordinates: 18°44′S 32°48′E

Stapleford is a village in the province of Manicaland, Zimbabwe, located northeast of Penhalonga. The village is the centre of the local timber industry and is on the edge of the Stapleford Forest near Lake Alexander. Stapleford Forest was established in 1920 and sawmilling began in 1940.
