= People's Own Savings Bank =

- Type: Parastatal
- Industry: Financial services
- Founded: 1904
- Headquarters: Harare, Zimbabwe
- Key people: Mathilda Dzumbunu; Chairperson; Admore Kandlela; CEO
- Products: Loans, savings, investments, debit cards, credit cards, mortgages
- Revenue: ▲Aftertax: US$7.9 million (2015)
- Total assets: US$133.7 million (2015)
- Number of employees: 453 (2016)
- Website: www.posb.co.zw

People's Own Savings Bank (POSB), is a savings bank in Zimbabwe. It is one of the financial institutions, licensed and supervised by the Reserve Bank of Zimbabwe, the national banking regulator.

As of 31 December 2015, POSB had total assets valued at US$133.7 million, with $63.81 million in customer deposits and made an after-tax profit of US$7.9 million in the calendar year 2015.

As at that time, the bank had over 500,000 savings accounts, maintained 34 brick and mortar branches, operated 220 agency branches through Zimpost, and another 18 agency branches through Meikles Supermarkets. That same month POSB started offering mortgages at 12 percent annual interest, with maximum terms of 10 years.

== History ==
POSB was formed in 1904, as the Post Office Saving Bank.

In 1999 the People’s Own Savings Bank Act was established as a corporate body in accordance with the People’s Own Savings Bank of Zimbabwe Act. In 2001, the Zimbabwe Posts & Telecommunications Corporation (PTC) was split into four independent entities: (a) Net-One, an Internet service provider, (b) Tel-One, a voice communication service provider (land-line and cellular) (c) Zimpost, a postal letter carrier and (d) POSB, a savings bank.

== Ownership ==
The People's Own Savings Bank is 95 percent owned by the Government of Zimbabwe.

== See also ==
- List of banks in Zimbabwe
