= Nedbank Zimbabwe Limited =

Commercial bank in Zimbabwe

- Type: Private
- Industry: Financial services
- Founded: 1956; 70 years ago
- Headquarters: Harare, Zimbabwe
- Key people: Innocent Dutiro; Chairman; Betty Murambadoro; Managing Director
- Products: Business and personal loans, savings, vehicle asset finance, investments, debit cards, mobile banking, mortgages, Internet banking, Bancassurance
- Revenue: ▲ Aftertax: historical ZWL386.011 million (2021); Total assets historical ZWL19.956 billion; Inflation adjusted ZWL20.007 billion (June 2021)
- Number of employees: 312 (2021)
- Website: www.nedbank.co.zw

Nedbank Zimbabwe Limited, also Nedbank Zimbabwe, is a commercial bank in Zimbabwe. It is licensed by the Reserve Bank of Zimbabwe, the central bank and national banking regulator. The bank was previously known as MBCA Bank, prior to rebranding to its present name.

== Location ==
The headquarters of the bank and its min branch are located on the 14th Floor of Old Mutual Centre, at the corner of Third Street and Jason Moyo Avenue, in Harare, the capital and largest city in Zimbabwe. The geographical coordinates of the bank's headquarters are: 17°49'46.0"S, 31°03'12.0"E (Latitude:-17.829444; Longitude:31.053333).

== Overview ==
As of December 2014, the bank is a medium-sized financial services provider in Zimbabwe, with an asset base of nearly ZWL19.956 Billion (historical terms)and ZWL20.007 Billion (Inflation adjusted terms), and shareholders' equity amounting to ZWL1 956 989 405 (historical) and ZWL1 957 136 131 (Inflation-adjusted).

The bank is a subsidiary of the Nedbank Group, an established financial services provider, headquartered in Johannesburg, South Africa, with total assets of almost ZAR1 188 005, as at June 2021.

== History ==
The bank was founded in 1956 by Rhodesia Selection Trust (RST) as the Merchant Bank of Central Africa. Following the issuance of a commercial banking license by the Reserve Bank of Zimbabwe, the national banking regulator, the bank rebranded to MBCA Bank Limited in 2004. Significant to the development of Southern Rhodesia and to the failing Central African Federation is at much the same time RST's competitor Anglo-American joined with Lazard Brothers of London to found Rhodesian Acceptances Limited (RAL). RAL, now known as RAL Merchant Bank (Zimbabwe) was part of Anglo-America until reorganisation/rationalisation, now in the Nedbank/Old Mutual Group.

== Subsidiaries ==
The bank has 100% ownership in the following subsidiaries:

- Melbek Holdings (Private) Limited - Real estate investments - Zimbabwe
- MBCA Nominees (Private) Limited - Nominee company - Zimbabwe
- MBCA Leasing (Private) Limited - Leasing - Zimbabwe

== Ownership ==
According to the website of the Reserve Bank of Zimbabwe, the major shareholders in the stock of the bank include the following:

Shareholding in MBCA Bank
| Rank | Shareholder | Percentage Ownership |
|---|---|---|
| 1 | Nedbank Group of South Africa | 66.02 |
| 2 | Old Mutual Zimbabwe Limited | 20.46 |
| 2 | Rothschild & Sons of the United Kingdom | 03.26 |
| 4 | Banca de Credito Finanziaio of Italy | 01.05 |
| 5 | MBCA Employee Share Trust | 4.87 |
| 6 | Others | 02.03 |
| Total | | 100.00 |

== Branch network ==
Nedbank Zimbabwe maintains a network of branches at the following locations:

1. Main Branch: 99 Jason Moyo Avenue, Harare
2. Southerton Branch: Shop 3, 11 Highfield Junction Road, Southerton, Harare
3. Borrowdale branch, Shop 112, Sam Levy's Village, Borrowdale, Harare
4. JMN Branch: Merchant Bank Chambers, 74 Joshua Mqabuko Nkomo Street, Bulawayo
5. Belmont Branch, 61 Plumtree Road, Belmont, Bulawayo
6. Gweru Branch, 55A Main Street, Gweru
7. Mutare Branch: Windsor Msasa House, 75 Herbert Chitepo Street, Mutare
8. Victoria Falls Branch: Shop 2, Sawanga Mall, Victoria Falls
9. Zvishavane Branch: 100 Ireland Road, Zvishavane.

== See also ==
- List of banks in Zimbabwe
- Reserve Bank of Zimbabwe
- Economy of Zimbabwe
