= List of banks in Zimbabwe =

This is a list of commercial banks in Zimbabwe, as updated mid-2024 by the Reserve Bank of Zimbabwe.

== List of commercial banks ==
- AFC Commercial Bank Ltd, state-owned
- African Banking Corporation Zimbabwe Ltd (BancABC), part of Atlas Mara Group
- CBZ Bank Ltd
- Ecobank Zimbabwe Ltd, part of Ecobank Group
- FBC Bank Ltd, part of the FBC Group
- First Capital Bank Zimbabwe Ltd, part of First Capital Bank Group
- Metbank Ltd
- Nedbank Zimbabwe Ltd, part of Nedbank Group
- NMB Bank Ltd
- Stanbic Bank Zimbabwe Ltd, part of Standard Bank Group
- Standard Chartered Bank Zimbabwe Ltd, part of Standard Chartered Group
- Steward Bank Ltd
- ZB Bank Ltd (Zimbank)
- Central Africa Building Society (CABS), part of Old Mutual Group
- FBC Building Society, part of the FBC Group
- National Building Society, state-owned
- People's Own Savings Bank (POSB), state-owned
- African Century Ltd, part of the African Century Group (Mauritius)
- EmpowerBank Ltd, state-owned
- GetBucks Microfinance Bank Ltd
- InnBucks Microbank Ltd
- Lion Microfinance Ltd
- Success Microfinance Bank
- Zimbabwe Women Microfinance Bank, state-owned
- Infrastructure Development Bank of Zimbabwe (IDBZ), state-owned
- Small and Medium Enterprises Development Corporation (SMEDCO), state-owned
- AFC Land & Development Bank of Zimbabwe Ltd, state-owned

== See also ==
- Economy of Zimbabwe
- List of banks in Africa
