= New Industrial Index (Zimbabwe) =

Zimbabwean stock index

The Zimbabwe New Industrial Index is a stock index derived from the values of industrial company shares publicly listed on the Zimbabwe Stock Exchange. The Zimbabwe Mining Index is a separate stock index, composed of mining companies.

== Index listing ==
October 2022

Symbol	Company	Notes
CAFCA.ZW	Cafca	Electrical cable manufacturing
GBH.ZW	General Beltings Holdings	Conveyor belt manufacturing
MSHL.ZW	Masimba Holdings	Engineering
NPKZ.ZW	Nampak Zimbabwe	Packaging
UNIF.ZW	Unifreight Africa	Logistics
ZECO.ZW	Zeco Holdings	Construction Machinery and Heavy Transportation Equipment
ZIMW.VX	Zimplow Holdings	Agricultural equipment manufacturing
