= Zimbabwe Stock Exchange =

Stock exchange in Harare, Zimbabwe

- Type: Stock exchange
- Location: Harare, Zimbabwe
- Founded: 1894
- Key people: Caroline Sandura (Board Chairperson); Nkomo L Compliance; Mubaiwa R Trading; Mushanguri L Business Development; Bgoni J CEO
- Currency: Zimbabwe Gold
- No. of listings: 45
- Indices: ZSE All Share Index; ZSE Top 10 Index; ZSE Industrial Index; ZSE Mining Index
- Website: zse.co.zw

The Zimbabwe Stock Exchange (ZSE) is the official stock exchange of Zimbabwe. Its history dates back to 1896 but has only been open to foreign investment since 1993. The exchange has about a dozen members, and currently lists 63 equities. There are two primary indices, the ZSE All Share and the ZSE Top 10.

== History ==
The first stock exchange in Zimbabwe opened shortly after the arrival of the Pioneer Column in Bulawayo in 1896. However, it only operated for about six years. Other stock exchanges were established in Gwelo (Gweru) and Umtali (Mutare). The Mutare Exchange, also opened in 1896, thrived on the success of local mining, but with the realization that deposits in the area were not extensive, activity declined and it closed in 1924. After World War II, a new exchange was founded in Bulawayo by Alfred Mulock Bentley and dealing started in January 1946.

A second floor was opened in Salisbury (Harare) in December 1951 and trading between the two centers took place by telephone. Traders continued working by telephone until it was decided that legislation should be enacted to govern the rights and obligations of the members of the exchange and the general investing public.

The Rhodesia Stock Exchange Act reached the statute book in January 1974. The members of the exchange continued to trade as before and for legal reasons it became necessary to create a new exchange coincidental with the passing of the legislation. The exchange dates from the passing of the act in 1974, and is operated and regulated in accordance with the act and its amendments, including 1996's Zimbabwe Stock Exchange Act: Chapter 24:18.

On achieving independence from Britain in 1980, the exchange changed its name from the Rhodesia to the Zimbabwe Stock Exchange.

With the decline of the Zimbabwean economy, hyperinflation rendered the Zimbabwean dollar useless and the US-Dollar was adopted as the legal tender for trading on the exchange in February 2009.

As of March 2009, trade has been very thin, with very few foreign investors willing to risk trading on the market. Most stocks trade in the US-cent range, with at least 26 different stocks not trading at all.

On 26 June 2020, the Zimbabwean government announced that the stock exchange would suspend trading from 29 June in order to impose measures that were expected to address the RTGS dollar, which has been experiencing high inflation since its introduction. The exchange resumed operations on 3 August 2020.

== Victoria Falls Stock Exchange ==
Victoria Falls Stock Exchange is a stock exchange established in 2020 as a subsidiary of the ZSE to operate in the Victoria Falls special economic zone.

== See also ==
- Economy of Zimbabwe
- List of stock exchanges
- List of African stock exchanges
- Zimbabwe Industrial Index
- Zimbabwe Mining Index
