= The Amazing Race 27 =

Season of television series

- Season 27
- Region 1 DVD cover
- Presented by: Phil Keoghan
- No. of teams: 11
- Winners: Kelsey Gerckens & Joey Buttitta
- No. of legs: 12
- Distance traveled: 34,000 mi (55,000 km)
- No. of episodes: 12

Release
- Original network: CBS
- Original release: September 25 – December 11, 2015

Additional information
- Filming dates: June 22 – July 14, 2015

Series chronology
- ← Previous; Season 26 Next → Season 28

The Amazing Race 27 is the twenty-seventh season of the American reality competition show The Amazing Race. Hosted by Phil Keoghan, it featured eleven teams of two, each with a pre-existing relationship, competing in a race around the world to win US$1,000,000. This season visited five continents and ten countries and traveled over 34,000 miles (55,000 km) during twelve legs. Starting in Los Angeles, racers traveled through Brazil, Argentina, Zambia, Zimbabwe, France, the Netherlands, Poland, India, Hong Kong, and Macau before returning to the United States and finishing in Southampton, New York. New twists introduced in this season include an Express Pass that had to be given to another team after it was used and a U-Turn placed at the Detour decision point. The season premiered on CBS September 25, 2015, and concluded on December 11, 2015.

Dating news reporters Kelsey Gerckens and Joey Buttitta of KEYT-TV were the winners of this season, while engaged couple Justin Scheman and Diana Bishop finished in second place, and dating paparazzi Logan Fazio and Chris Gordon finished in third place.

== Format ==
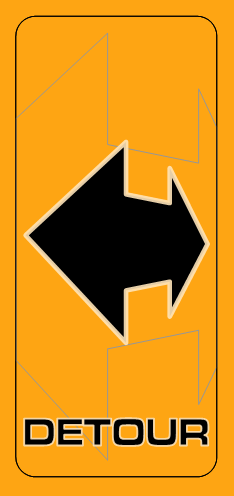
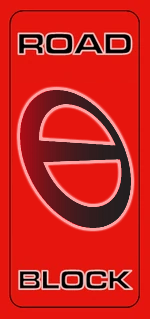
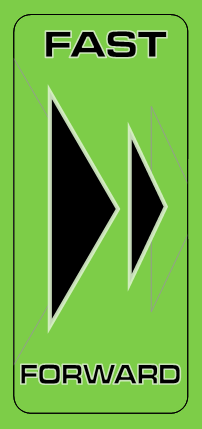
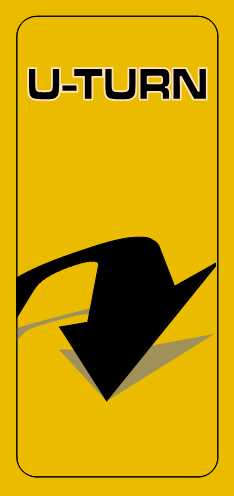
The clues which contestants receive during the course of the race generally fall into five categories: Route Info, Detour, Roadblock, Fast Forward, and U-Turn.

The Amazing Race is a reality television show created by Bertram van Munster and Elise Doganieri, and hosted by Phil Keoghan. The series follows teams of two competing in a race around the world. Each leg of the race requires teams to deduce clues, navigate foreign environments, interact with locals, perform physical and mental challenges, and travel on a limited budget provided by the show. At each stop during the leg, teams receive clues inside sealed envelopes, which fall into one of these categories:

- Route Info: These are simple instructions that teams must follow before they can receive their next clue.
- Detour: A Detour is a choice between two tasks. Teams may choose either task and switch tasks if they find one option too difficult. There is usually one Detour present on each leg.
- Roadblock: A Roadblock is a task that only one team member can complete. Teams must choose which member will complete the task based on a brief clue they receive before fully learning the details of the task. There is usually one Roadblock present on each leg.
- Fast Forward: A Fast Forward is a task that only one team may complete, which allows that team to skip all remaining tasks on the leg and go directly to the next Pit Stop. Teams may only claim one Fast Forward during the entire race.
- U-Turn: The U-Turn allows teams to force another team to complete both options of the Detour before they can continue the race.
- Speed Bump: A penalty for teams who finished in last place on a non-elimination leg. It required the team to complete an additional task in the following leg that only they had to complete.

Most teams who arrive last at the Pit Stop of each leg are progressively eliminated, while the first team to arrive at the finish line in the final episode wins the grand prize of US$1,000,000.

== Contestants ==
The cast included TMZ editor Kelly Berning and post production supervisor Shevonne Sullivan, former New York Jets cheerleaders Tiffany Torres and Krista DeBono, former America's Best Dance Crew contestants Ernest "E-Knock" Phillips and Jayjion "Jin Lao" Greer, Justin Scheman and Diana Bishop, who were known for their viral Amazing Race proposal video, and reporters Kelsey Gerckens and Joey Buttitta from KEYT-TV.

Contestants	Age	Relationship	Hometown	Status
Kelly Berning	37	Co-Workers (Team TMZ)	Los Angeles, California	Eliminated 1st (in Rio de Janeiro, Brazil)
Shevonne Sullivan	31	Co-Workers (Team TMZ)	Los Angeles, California	Eliminated 1st (in Rio de Janeiro, Brazil)
Alex Manard	22	Cousins (The Cousins)	Champaign, Illinois	Eliminated 2nd (in Buenos Aires, Argentina)
Adam Dingeman	24	Cousins (The Cousins)	Des Moines, Iowa	Eliminated 2nd (in Buenos Aires, Argentina)
Ernest Phillips	29	Brothers (The Dancers)	Boston, Massachusetts	Eliminated 3rd (in San Antonio de Areco, Argentina)
Jin Lao Greer	26	Brothers (The Dancers)	Boston, Massachusetts	Eliminated 3rd (in San Antonio de Areco, Argentina)
Jazmine Lewis	23	Best Friends & Athletes (The Track Stars)	Los Angeles, California	Eliminated 4th (in Victoria Falls, Zimbabwe)
Danielle Littleton	22	Best Friends & Athletes (The Track Stars)	Los Angeles, California	Eliminated 4th (in Victoria Falls, Zimbabwe)
Cindy Chac	36	Newlyweds (Chac Attack)	San Diego, California	Eliminated 5th (in The Hague, Netherlands)
Rick Chac	38	Newlyweds (Chac Attack)	San Diego, California	Eliminated 5th (in The Hague, Netherlands)
Tanner Kloven	26	Best Friends (Team Texas)	Dallas, Texas	Eliminated 6th (in Agra, India)
Josh Ahern	28	Best Friends (Team Texas)	Dallas, Texas	Eliminated 6th (in Agra, India)
Denise Williams	51	Mother & Son (Team Alabama)	Prattville, Alabama	Eliminated 7th (in Agra, India)
James Earl Corley	26	Mother & Son (Team Alabama)	Prattville, Alabama	Eliminated 7th (in Agra, India)
Tiffany Torres	28	Former NFL Cheerleaders (The Cheerleaders)	Hoboken, New Jersey	Eliminated 8th (in Macau)
Krista DeBono	28	Former NFL Cheerleaders (The Cheerleaders)	Staten Island, New York	Eliminated 8th (in Macau)
Logan Fazio	36	Dating Paparazzi (The Paparazzi)	Miami Beach, Florida	Third place
Chris Gordon	46	Dating Paparazzi (The Paparazzi)	Miami Beach, Florida	Third place
Justin Scheman	39	Engaged (The Green Team)	Philadelphia, Pennsylvania	Runners-up
Diana Bishop	30	Engaged (The Green Team)	Philadelphia, Pennsylvania	Runners-up
Kelsey Gerckens	25	Dating News Anchors (The Reporters)	Santa Barbara, California	Winners
Joey Buttitta	26	Dating News Anchors (The Reporters)	Santa Barbara, California	Winners

Future appearances

After the season aired, Kelsey & Joey got engaged during their interview on Home and Family, and eventually married on August 25, 2017. On January 22, 2020, they both appeared on an episode of CBS's Let's Make a Deal while Kelsey was pregnant with their oldest son.

On May 25, 2016, Kelsey & Joey and Tiffany & Krista appeared on an Amazing Race-themed primetime special episode of The Price Is Right.

On November 1, 2017, Krista DeBono appeared as the Pit Stop greeter for Leg 2 of HaMerotz LaMillion 6, the Israeli version of The Amazing Race, at Times Square in New York City.

Justin & Diana appeared on season 30 in attendance at the starting line.

On March 1, 2020, Alex Manard appeared on an episode of Discovery Channel's Naked and Afraid and lasted the full 21 days in the Amazon rainforest of Yasuni, Ecuador.

== Contestant progress ==
The following teams are listed with their placements in each leg. Placements are listed in finishing order.

- A red placement with a dagger (†) indicates that the team was eliminated.
- An underlined blue placement with a double-dagger (‡) indicates that the team was the last to arrive at a Pit Stop in a non-elimination leg, and had to perform a Speed Bump task in the following leg.
- An italicized and underlined placement indicates that the team was the last to arrive at a Pit Stop, but there was no rest period at the Pit Stop and all teams were instructed to continue racing. There was no required Speed Bump task in the next leg.
- A purple ε indicates that the team used an Express Pass on that leg to bypass one of their tasks.
- A brown ⊃ indicates that the team used the U-Turn and a brown ⊂ indicates the team on the receiving end of the U-Turn.

Team placement (by leg)
Team	1	2	3	4	5	6	7	8	9	10	11	12
Kelsey & Joey	8th	7th	3rd	4th	4th	3rd	2nd	2nd	2nd⊃ (Note: Kelsey & Joey chose to use the U-Turn on Tanner & Josh.)	2nd	2nd	1st
Justin & Diana	9th	1st	2nd	1st	2nd	1st	1st	1st	1st	1st⊃ (Note: Justin & Diana chose to use the U-Turn on Logan & Chris.)	3rd	2nd
Logan & Chris	5th	4th	5th	6th	6th	6th	5th	4th	3rd	4th⊂	1st	3rd
Tiffany & Krista	10th	6th	8th	8th (Note: This team arrived last at the Pit Stop, but they were instructed to continue racing.)	5th	2nd	3rd	5th	4th	3rd	4th†	
Denise & James Earl	4th	3rd	6th (Note: Denise & James Earl initially arrived 5th, but were issued a 30-minute penalty after Denise verbally helped James Earl during the Roadblock. Logan & Chris checked in during this penalty time, dropping Denise & James Earl to 6th.)	3rd	1stε (Note: Denise & James Earl used their Express Pass to bypass the Detour on this leg.)	7th	6th	3rd	5th	5th†		
Tanner & Josh	1st	2nd	1st	2ndε (Note: Tanner & Josh used their Express Pass to bypass the Roadblock on this leg.)	3rd	4th	4th	6th‡	6th†⊂			
Cindy & Rick	3rd	5th	7th	5th	7th	5th	7th†					
Jazmine & Danielle	2nd	8th	4th	7th	8th†							
Ernest & Jin	7th	9th	9th†									
Alex & Adam	6th	10th†										
Kelly & Shevonne	11th†											

== Race summary ==
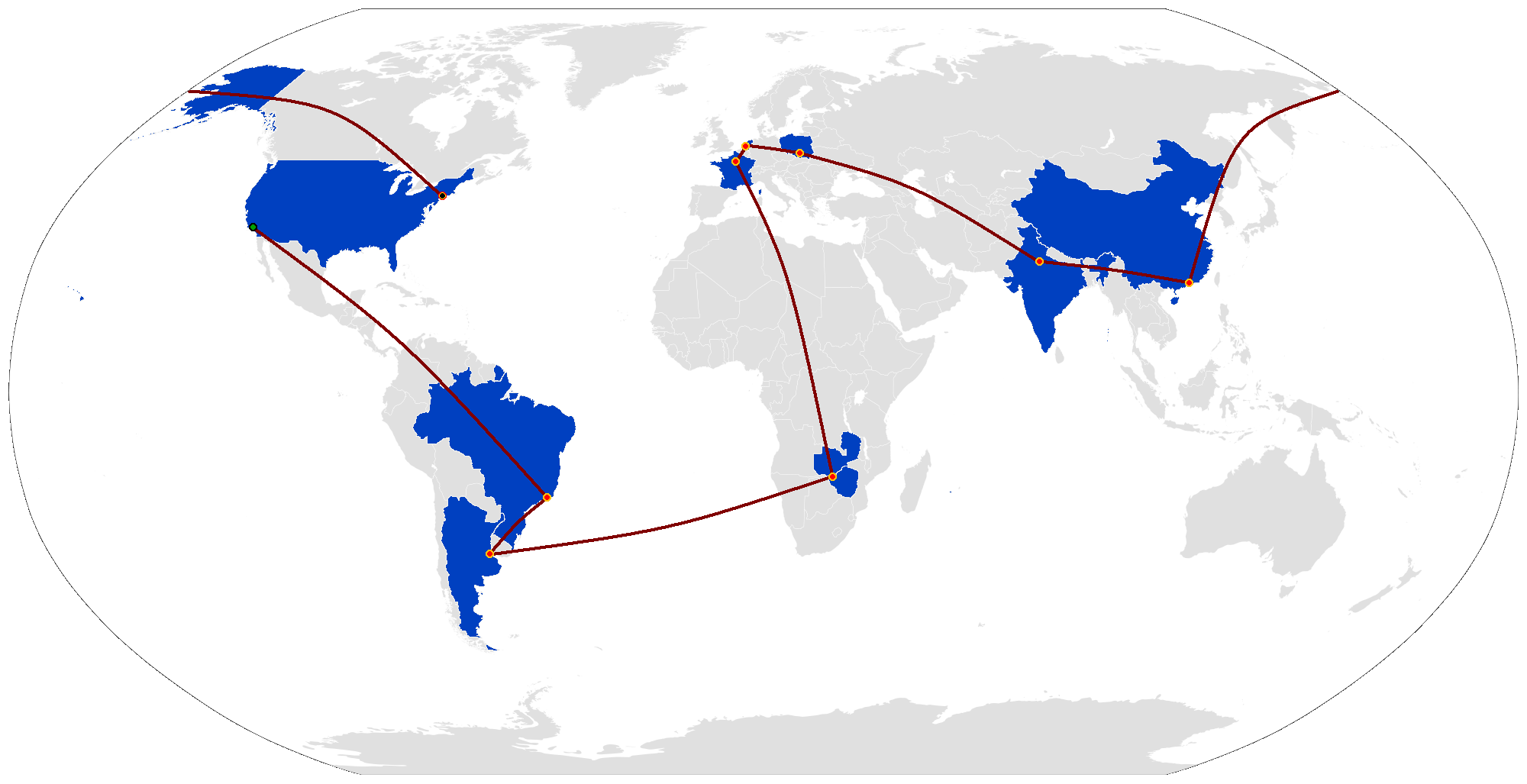
The route of The Amazing Race 27.

Destinations	Air travel Rail travel Water travel Bus travel Helicopter travel Bicycle travel Gondola travel
Route Markers	Detour Roadblock Fast Forward U-Turn Speed Bump Pit Stop

=== Leg 1 (United States → Brazil) ===
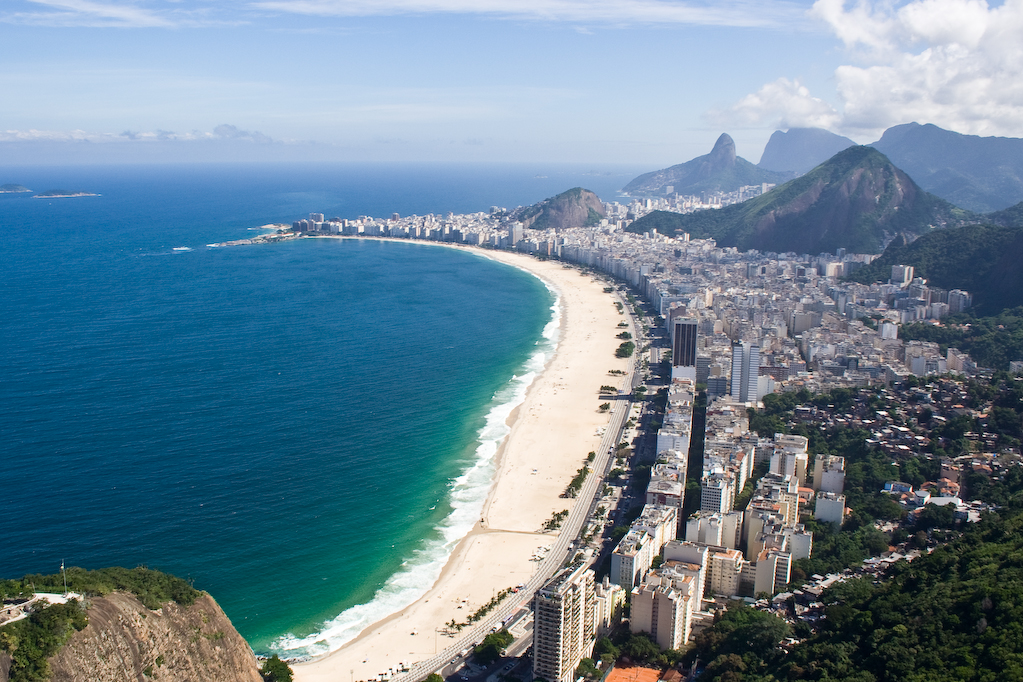
The Detour in Rio de Janeiro had teams take part in beach-related tasks on Copacabana Beach.

- Episode 1: "A Little Too Much Beefcake" (September 25, 2015)
- Prize: Express Pass (awarded to Tanner & Josh)
- Eliminated: Kelly & Shevonne

Locations

- Los Angeles, California (Venice Beach) (Starting Line)
- Marina del Rey (Mother's Beach → Burton Chace Park)
- Los Angeles → Rio de Janeiro, Brazil
- Rio de Janeiro (Lagoa Heliport → Urca Hill)
- Rio de Janeiro (Clube São Conrado Free Flight)
- Rio de Janeiro (Copacabana Beach)
- Rio de Janeiro (Arpoador Lookout)

Episode summary

- From Venice Beach, teams had to travel by taxi to Mother's Beach, choose a water-bike, and then pedal it to Phil Keoghan in Burton Chace Park, where they received plane tickets to their first destination: Rio de Janeiro, Brazil. The first team to complete this task received the only tickets on the first flight, while all of the other teams departed a half-hour later on the second flight. Once there, teams had to travel to Lagoa Heliport in order to find their next clue.
- In this season's only Fast Forward, one team would have had to ride a hang glider from Pedra Bonita and soar above the city. Due to windy weather conditions, no teams won the Fast Forward, since they did not want to wait until weather conditions might have improved.
- Teams who chose to not attempt the Fast Forward had to travel by helicopter to Urca Hill, flying past Christ the Redeemer en route. After landing, the heliport manager asked the teams the name of the monument they passed during the flight, and if teams answered correctly, they received their next clue.
- This season's first Detour on Copacabana Beach was a choice between Sand or Sidewalk. In Sand, teams had to play footvolley against local professional players, who could not use their hands while the racers could, and score six points before the pros scored 18, in order to receive their next clue. In Sidewalk, teams had to solve a giant geometric slide puzzle derived from the Portuguese pavement style of the Copacabana pavement in order to receive their next clue.
- After the Detour, teams had to check in at the Pit Stop: Arpoador Lookout.

Additional note

- Kelly & Shevonne completed the Detour, but never made it to the Pit Stop. After all of the other teams had already checked in, Phil came to Copacabana Beach to inform them of their elimination.

=== Leg 2 (Brazil → Argentina) ===
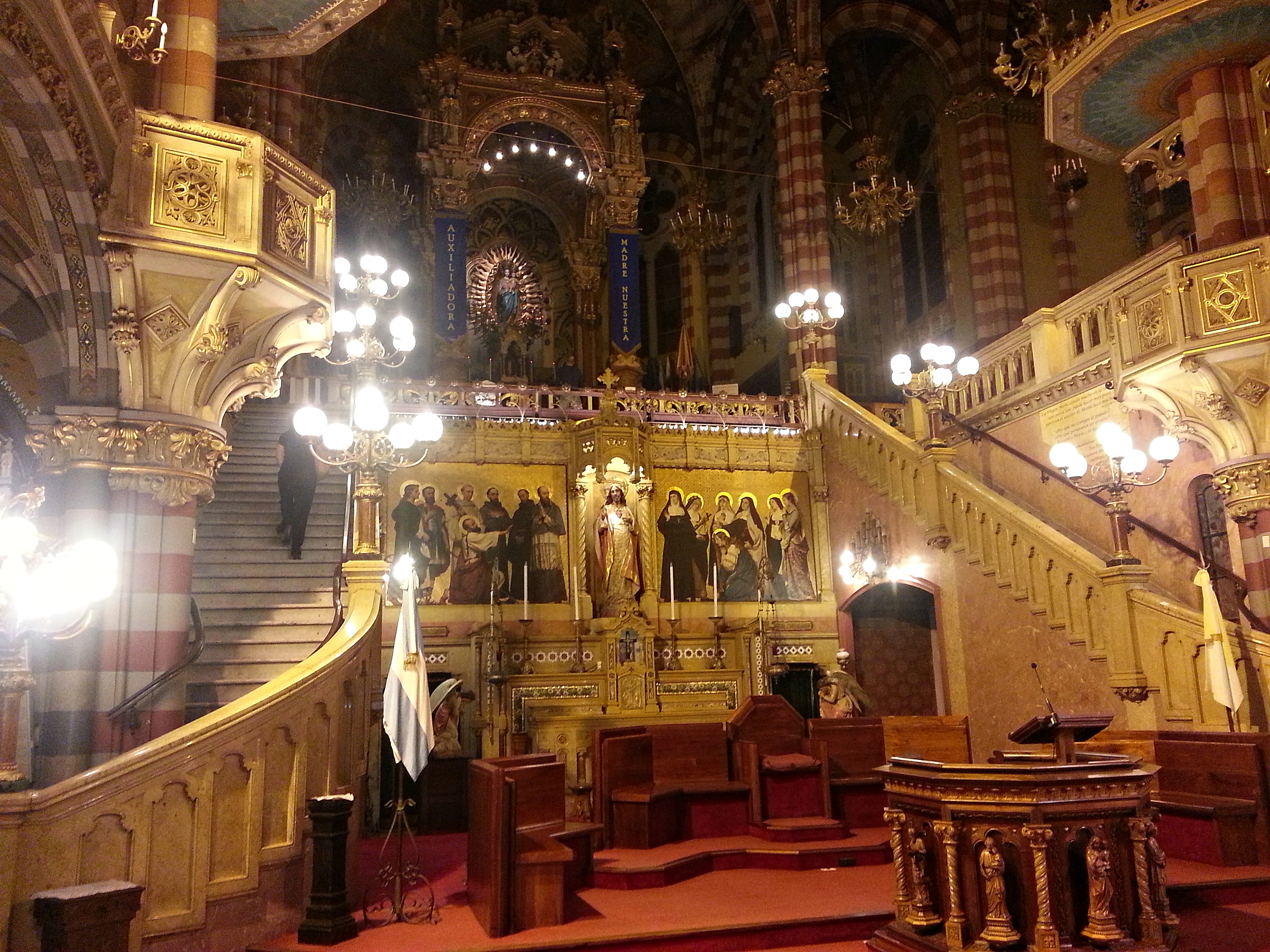
After arriving in Buenos Aires, teams visited the room where Pope Francis was baptized inside the Basílica María Auxiliadora y San Carlos.

- Episode 2: "Get in There and Think Like a Dog" (October 2, 2015)
- Prize: A trip for two to El Jadida, Morocco (awarded to Justin & Diana)
- Eliminated: Alex & Adam

Locations

- Rio de Janeiro (Arpoador Lookout)
- Rio de Janeiro → Buenos Aires, Argentina
- Buenos Aires (Basílica María Auxiliadora y San Carlos)
- Buenos Aires (Palermo Neighborhood or Gabriel del Campo Antiques & Lezama Park)
- Buenos Aires (Bartolomé Mitre 4272)
- Buenos Aires (Campo Argentino de Polo)

Episode summary

- At the start of this leg, teams were instructed to fly to Buenos Aires, Argentina. Once there, teams had to locate the church where Pope Francis was baptized, which teams had to figure out was the Basílica María Auxiliadora y San Carlos. The next morning, teams entered the church, one at a time and in the order in which they had arrived, where a priest gave them their next clue.
- This leg's Detour was a choice between Cartoneros or Fletero. In Cartoneros, teams traveled to the Palermo Neighborhood, where they had to select a cart, collect cardboard from recycling bins, and transport it to a truck to be weighed. Once they'd collected at least 100 kilograms (220 lb), teams received their next clue. In Fletero, teams traveled to Gabriel del Campo Antiques near Plaza Dorrego, picked up the pieces of a statue, and brought them to a truck. One team member sat in the front and give the driver directions, while the other held the pieces in the back until they reached the gazebo at Plaza Intendente Sebeer. At the park, teams had to properly reassemble the statute in order to receive their next clue.
- After the Detour, teams had to travel to Bartolomé Mitre 4272 in order to find their next clue.
- In this season's first Roadblock, one team member had to properly perform a tango routine, including a portion where they were harnessed and danced on the wall, in order to receive their next clue.
- After the Roadblock, teams were instructed to find the Pit Stop at "The Cathedral of Polo", which they had to figure out was the Campo Argentino de Polo.

=== Leg 3 (Argentina) ===
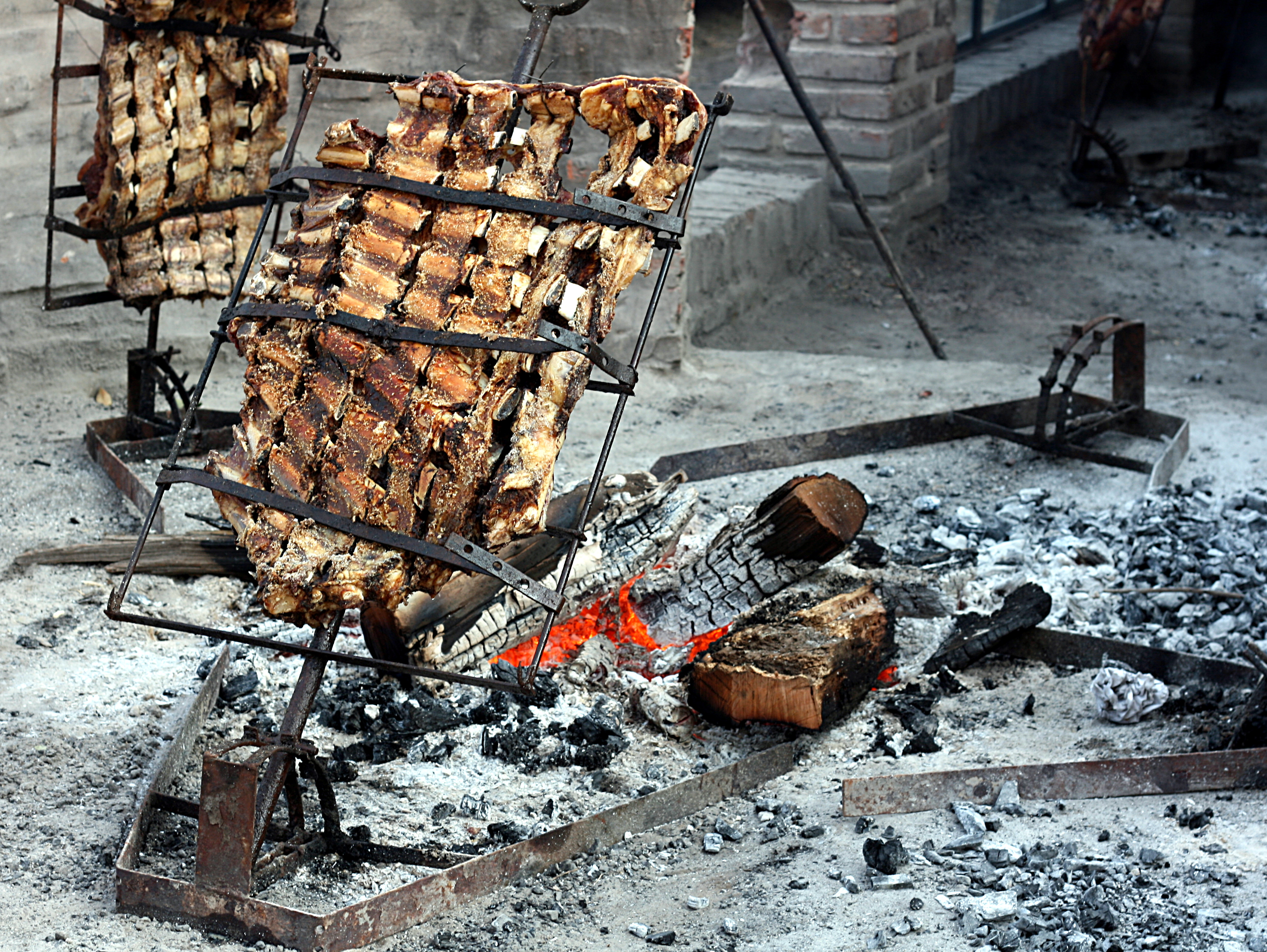
For the Roadblock, team members had to properly hang racks of lamb and beef to make asado: an Argentine national dish.

- Episode 3: "Where My Dogs At?" (October 9, 2015)
- Prize: A trip for two to Siem Reap, Cambodia (awarded to Tanner & Josh)
- Eliminated: Ernest & Jin

Locations

- Buenos Aires (Campo Argentino de Polo)
- Buenos Aires → San Antonio de Areco
- San Antonio de Areco (La Porteña)
- San Antonio de Areco (Plaza Principal)
- San Antonio de Areco (Boliche de Bessonart & Riverside or La Cinacina Estancia)
- San Antonio de Areco (Parque Criollo y Museo Gauchesco Ricardo Güiraldes)

Episode summary

- At the start of this leg, teams were instructed to travel by bus to San Antonio de Areco. Once there, teams were driven to La Porteña, where they found their next clue.
- In this leg's Roadblock, one team member had to properly hang two racks of lamb and one rack of beef ribs onto a set of metal grills to cook the meat asado-style, with the bones oriented in the correct direction and properly skewered on all sides, in order to receive their next clue.
- After the Roadblock, teams had to deliver a roasted lamb to a festival at Plaza Principal in order to receive their next clue.
- This leg's Detour was a choice between Horse or Carriage. In Horse, teams had to pick a polo mallet from the plaza and walk to Boliche de Bessonart, where they changed into polo gear. They then had to walk to the riverside and pick out a fake horse that needed to be properly tacked and pushed back to the plaza. In Carriage, teams had to pick a buggy whip from the plaza and travel by foot to La Cinacina Estancia. There, they had to don gaucho clothing, clean a carriage, and then push it to a team of waiting horses. Once the horses were harnessed to the buggy, they had to ride back to the plaza. At the end of both Detour tasks, teams had to present either the fake horse or the buggy whip to the judges in order to receive their next clue.
- After the Detour, teams were instructed to travel by foot to the Pit Stop: the Parque Criollo y Museo Gauchesco Ricardo Güiraldes.

=== Leg 4 (Argentina → Zambia → Zimbabwe) ===
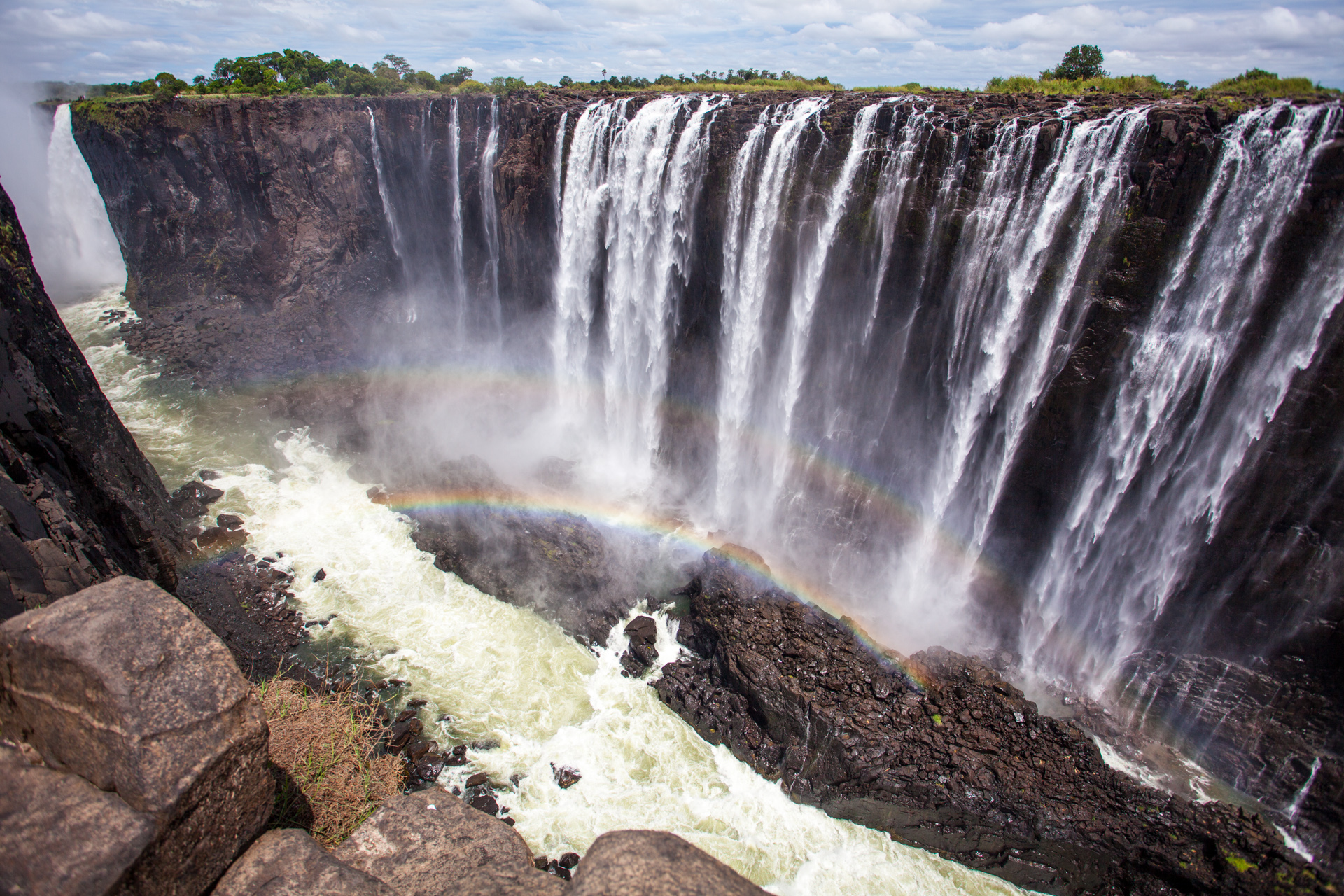
While in Zambia, teams visited Victoria Falls, the largest sheet of falling water in the world.

- Episode 4: "Good Old Fashioned Spit in the Face" (October 16, 2015)

Locations

- San Antonio de Areco (Plaza Principal)
- San Antonio de Areco → Buenos Aires
- Buenos Aires → Livingstone, Zambia
- Kazungula District (Mukuni Village)
- Livingstone (Batoka Aerodrome)
- Mosi-oa-Tunya National Park (Victoria Falls – Knife's Edge Bridge)
- Victoria Falls, Zimbabwe (Shoestrings Backpackers Lodge)
- Victoria Falls (The Big Five Co-Op or Victoria Falls Hotel)
- Victoria Falls (Rose of Charity Orphanage)

Episode summary

- At the start of this leg, teams had to find a specific travel agency and pick up tickets for one of two flights to Livingstone, Zambia, each carrying four teams and arriving fifteen minutes apart. Once there, teams had to travel to Mukuni Village and take part in a traditional welcome ceremony before receiving their next clue, which directed them to the Batoka Aerodrome.
- In this leg's Roadblock, one team member had to fly above Victoria Falls in a microlight plane and spot a route marker below on the Knife's Edge Bridge. After landing, they could reunite with their partner and travel to the bridge, where they found their next clue. Tanner & Josh used their Express Pass to bypass this Roadblock, and then bequeathed the Express Pass to Denise & James Earl.
- After the Roadblock, teams had to travel to the Shoestrings Backpackers Lodge in Victoria Falls, Zimbabwe, where they had to pick one of three departure times for the next morning and spend the night.
- This leg's Detour was a choice between Co-Op or Croquet. In Co-Op, teams traveled to The Big Five Co-Op and had to stain and polish a carved wooden giraffe. Once the carving was properly painted and dried, teams received their next clue. In Croquet, teams traveled to the Victoria Falls Hotel and had to play croquet, scoring five points against professional players, in order to receive their next clue.
- After the Detour, teams had to check in at the Pit Stop: the Rose of Charity Orphanage.

Additional notes

- The Detour options on the teams' clues were listed as Co-Op and Croquet; however, the graphics on the show listed the Detour options as Wood and Croquet.
- Tiffany & Krista chose to use the U-Turn on Justin & Diana. However, Justin & Diana had already passed the U-Turn by that point and were therefore unaffected.
- There was no elimination at the end of this leg; all teams were instead instructed to continue racing.

=== Leg 5 (Zimbabwe) ===
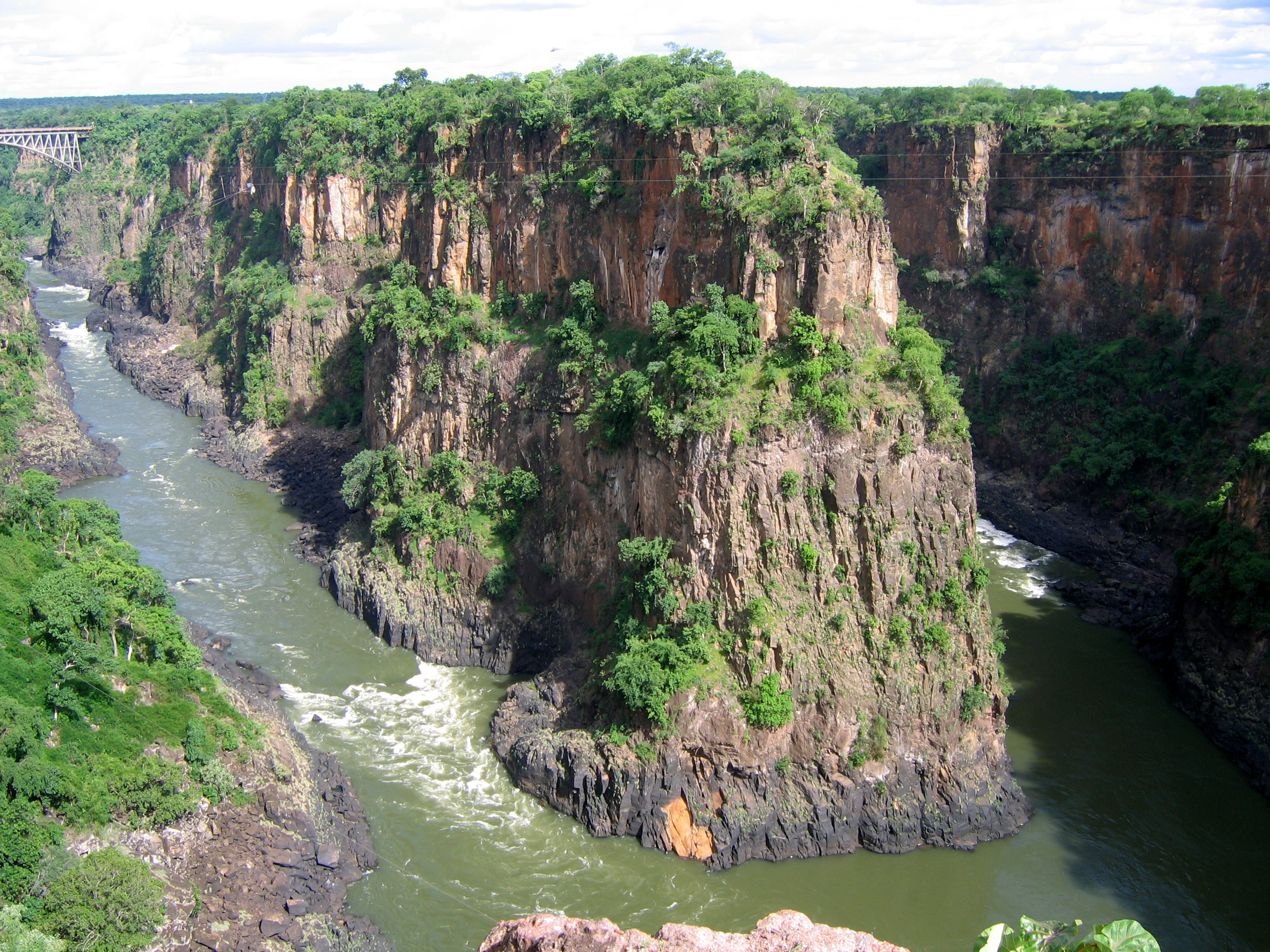
This leg revisited the first challenge of season 1, where team members had to swing across Batoka Gorge.

- Episode 5: "King of the Jungle" (October 23, 2015)
- Prize: A trip for two to Bratislava, Slovakia (awarded to Denise & James Earl)
- Eliminated: Jazmine & Danielle

Locations

- Victoria Falls (The Lookout Café)
- Victoria Falls National Park (Batoka Gorge)
- Victoria Falls (Elephants Walk Shopping and Artist Village – Crocodile Cage Diving or A'Zambezi River Lodge)
- Victoria Falls (Masuwe Private Game Reserve – The Lion Encounter)
- Victoria Falls (Masuwe Private Game Reserve – Masuwe Lodge)

Episode summary

- At the start of this leg, teams had to travel to The Lookout Café and find their next clue.
- This leg's Roadblock was a Switchback to the very first Detour from season 1. One team member had to strap on a harness and free-fall 200 feet (61 m) into the Batoka Gorge and swing above the Zambezi River. Once racers returned to the top, they received their next clue.
- This leg's Detour was a choice between Crocs or Canoes. In Crocs, teams had to travel to Crocodile Cage Diving at the Elephants Walk Shopping and Artist Village. Teams had to don wetsuits and were submerged in a metal cage, where they had to use poles to feed meat to three Nile crocodiles before receiving their next clue. In Canoes, teams had to travel to the A'Zambezi River Lodge, where they had to get an inflatable canoe and paddle together across the river. Once on the island, one team member had to hoist their partner up a tree in order to retrieve their next clue from a nest. Teams then had to paddle back across the river. Denise & James Earl used their Express Pass to bypass this Detour.
- After the Detour, teams had to travel to The Lion Encounter at the Masuwe Private Game Reserve. Accompanied by safari instructors and two lions, they walked through the bush to find their next clue hidden in a skull. Both team members then received a large cloth that was tied around their heads and a basket of fruit that they had to carry on their heads while walking to the nearby Pit Stop: Masuwe Lodge.

=== Leg 6 (Zimbabwe → Zambia → France) ===
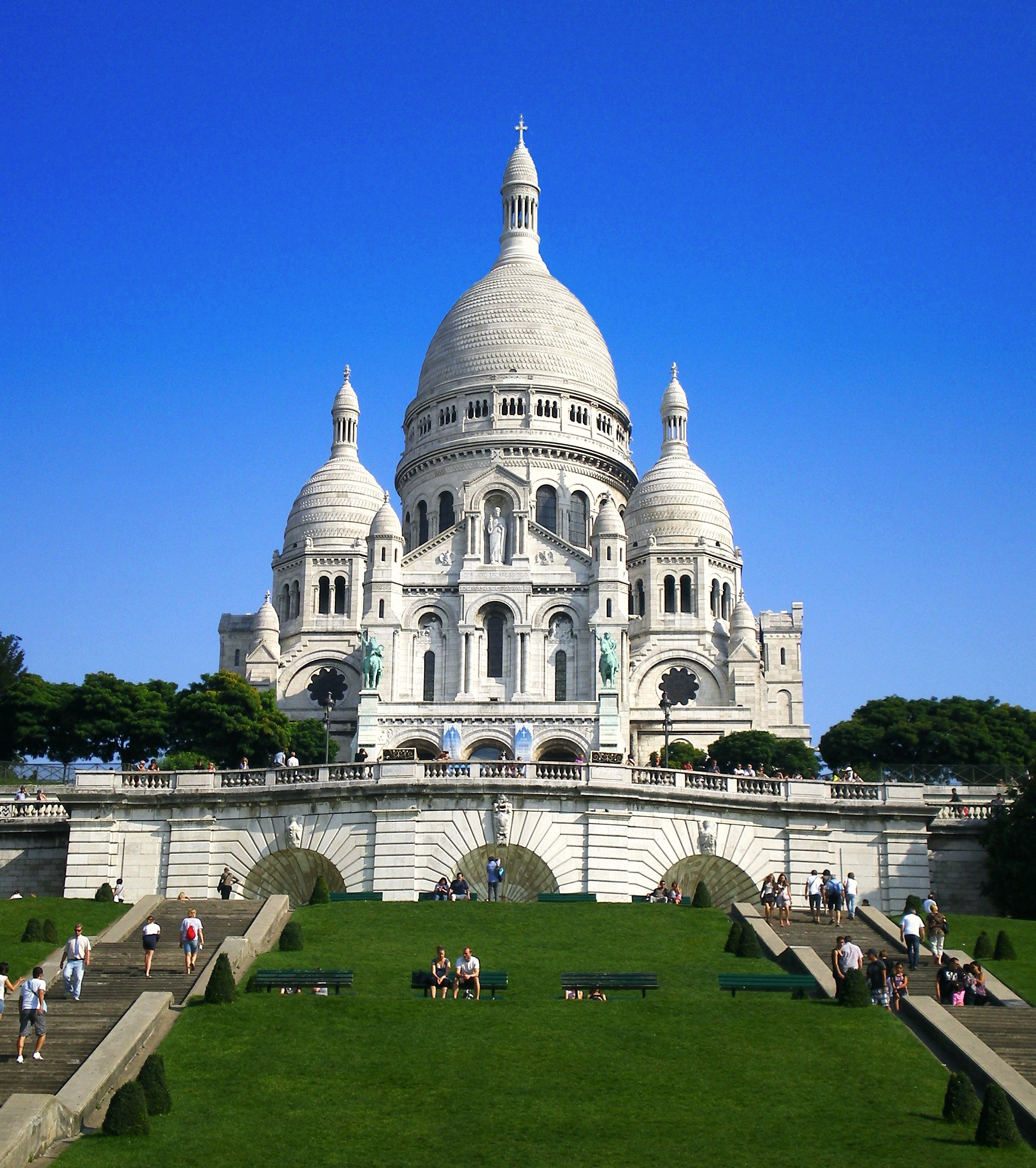
Teams found a clue in front of the Sacré-Cœur Basilica in Paris.

- Episode 6: "My Tongue Doesn't Even Twist That Way" (October 30, 2015)

Locations

- Victoria Falls (Victoria Falls Safari Lodge)
- Victoria Falls National Park (Victoria Falls Bridge)
- Livingstone, Zambia → Paris, France
- Paris → La Ferté-Alais
- Cerny (Aérodrome Musée Volant Salis)
- La Ferté-Alais → Paris
- Paris (Montmartre – Square Louise-Michel)
- Paris (Port de la Tournelle or La Coupole)
- Paris (Pont Alexandre III)
- Paris (Place Charles de Gaulle)

Episode summary

- In this leg's first Roadblock, one team member had to bungee jump 364 feet (111 m) from the Victoria Falls Bridge. After returning to the top of the bridge, they had to record their heart rate on their fitness watch before receiving their next clue.
- After the first Roadblock, teams were instructed to fly to Paris, France. Once there, teams had to travel by train to La Ferté-Alais and then travel to the Aérodrome Musée Volant Salis in Cerny, where they found their next clue.
- In this leg's second Roadblock, the team member who did not perform the previous Roadblock had to fly in a vintage Boeing-Stearman biplane over the French countryside, spot three words on the ground – LIBERTÉ, ÉGALITÉ, FRATERNITÉ – and then recite them to a biplane pilot after landing in order to receive their next clue. The team member that flew on the biplane then had to record their heart rate on their fitness watch.
- After the second Roadblock, teams had to return to Paris and then search the Square Louise-Michel beneath the Sacré-Cœur Basilica for Le Fantôme Blanc, who handed them their next clue.
- This leg's Detour was a choice between Drops Mic or Bust a Crab. In Drops Mic, teams had to travel to the Port de la Tournelle and perform the French rap song "79 à 99" by Passi with correct pronunciation, rhythm, and vibes in order to receive their next clue. In Bust a Crab, teams had to travel to La Coupole Restaurant and prepare a signature dish – the Royal Platter – by properly shucking and cracking crabs to the chef's standards in order to receive their next clue.
- After the Detour, teams received a postcard depicting the Pont Alexandre III. There, they found their next clue, which instructed teams to go "across from the iconic monument where the first team will triumph", referring to Place Charles de Gaulle across from the Arc de Triomphe, where teams checked in at the Pit Stop.

Additional note

- There was no elimination at the end of this leg; all teams were instead instructed to continue racing.

=== Leg 7 (France → Netherlands) ===
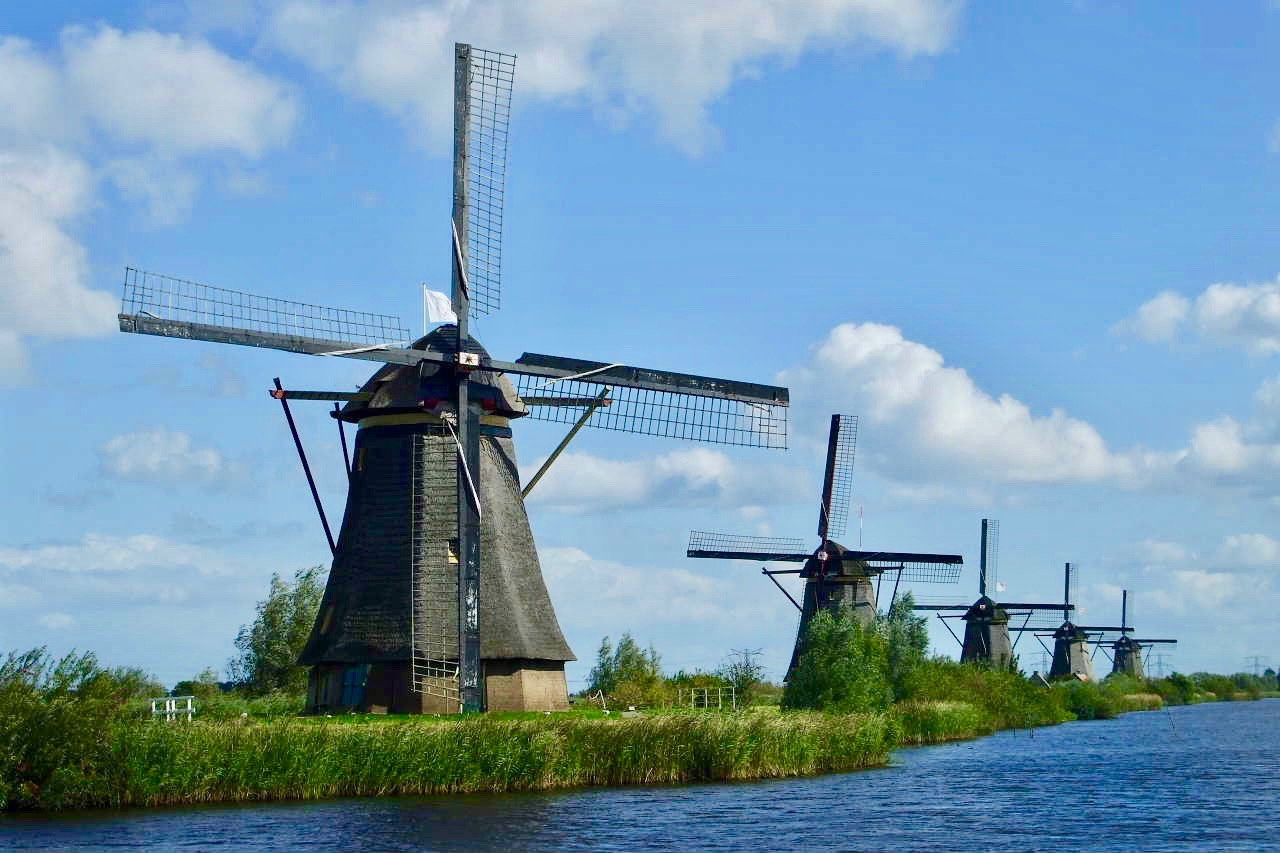
The windmills at Kinderdijk were the site of this leg's Roadblock, where racers searched for a duplicate of Van Gogh's Sunflowers.

- Episode 7: "Full Speed Ahead, Captain!" (November 6, 2015)
- Prize: A cash prize of $31,873 (awarded to Justin and Diana)
- Eliminated: Cindy and Rick

Locations

- Paris → Rotterdam, Netherlands
- Rotterdam (Leuvehaven – Lightvessel No. 11)
- Rotterdam (Kop van Zuid) → Molenwaard (Kinderdijk Windmills)
- Schiedam (Nolet Distillery)
- Rotterdam (Millennium Tower or Leuvehoofd)
- Rotterdam → The Hague
- The Hague (Peace Palace)

Episode summary

- At the start of this leg, teams were instructed to travel by train to Rotterdam, Netherlands. In addition, they received a picture of a ship and had to figure out that their next location was Lightvessel No. 11, docked in Leuvehaven. Teams picked a departure time the next morning and then spent the night on the ship. The next morning, teams took a water taxi to the windmills in Kinderdijk, where they found their next clue.
- In this leg's Roadblock, one team member had to find an exact duplicate of Vincent van Gogh's Sunflowers, placed amongst numerous similar versions with minor differences, located around the nearby windmills in order to receive their next clue.
- After the Roadblock, teams had to record their highest heart rate from the previous leg and their heart rate from this leg's Roadblock and subtract the difference. The solution determined the number of tulips they had to deliver to the Spakenburgermeisje (the girl from Spakenburg) in order to receive their next clue, which instructed them to take a water taxi to the Nolet Distillery.
- This leg's Detour was a choice between Ship or Skip. For both Detour options, teams had to travel by tram back in Rotterdam. In Ship, teams traveled to the Millennium Tower and used a training simulator that simulated navigating Rotterdam Harbor in stormy weather. The simulation was a two-part mission: teams had to first deliver a pilot to a ship and then go to the aid of a distressed ship. They had to successfully complete the mission within five minutes in order to receive their next clue. In Skip, teams traveled to Leuvehoofd Park and had to complete a 45-second Double Dutch clapping routine on a jump rope in order to receive their next clue.
- After the Detour, teams had to travel by train to The Hague and then by tram to the Pit Stop at the Peace Palace.

Additional note

- The cash prize that Justin & Diana received matched the total sum of their footsteps on this leg: $31,873. Fitbit also awarded them an 89-minute massage at the Pit Stop, which matched the time of the higher heart rate of the pair (Justin) at the end of this leg.

=== Leg 8 (Netherlands → Poland) ===
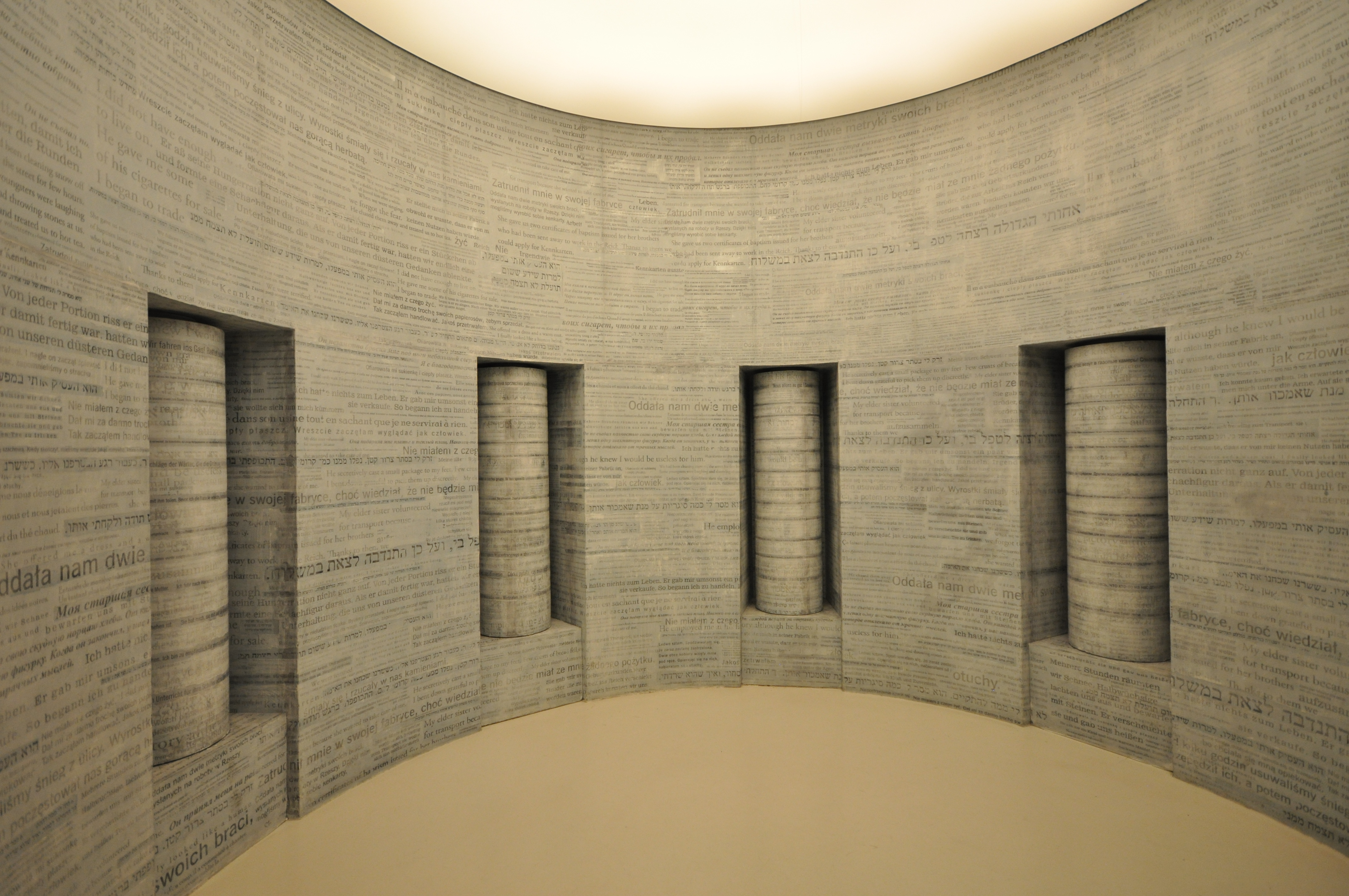
In Kraków, teams visited the Oskar Schindler Factory, where Jews killed during the Holocaust were memorialized.

- Episode 8: "Krakow, I'm Gonna Get You" (November 13, 2015)
- Prize: A trip for two to Shanghai, China (awarded to Justin & Diana)

Locations

- The Hague (Peace Palace)
- The Hague → Amsterdam
- Amsterdam → Kraków, Poland
- Kraków (Plaża Kraków)
- Wieliczka (Wieliczka Salt Mine) or Kraków (Main Square)
- Kraków (Oskar Schindler Factory)
- Kraków (Kazimierz – Szeroka 22)
- Kraków (Klezmer-Hois)

Episode summary

- At the start of this leg, teams were instructed to use a mobile app to book a flight to Kraków, Poland before traveling by train to Amsterdam and then flying to the city. Once there, teams had to travel to Plaża Kraków, where one team member had to dive into the swimming pool and retrieve their next clue.
- This leg's Detour was a choice between Mine or Music. In Mine, teams traveled to the Wieliczka Salt Mine and descended 1,000 feet (300 m) into the mine. They then had to carry a large timber support beam to a loading area, fill a mine cart with salt, and push the cart back through the tunnel to a miner, who gave teams their next clue. In Music, teams traveled to Kraków's Main Square, where they had to choose a professional pianist, learn a musical piece, and then roll a piano through the streets to a performance area. Teams had to perform a duet with a violinist and earn 100zł (roughly $25) from passersby in order to receive their next clue.
- After the Detour, teams had to travel to the Oskar Schindler Factory, where they were given a tour of the factory before receiving their next clue. Teams then found their next clue in the Kazimierz.
- In this leg's Roadblock, one team member had to identify seven traditional Jewish dishes on a dinner order from a vast spread and deliver the correct quantity of dishes to the Klezmer-Hois restaurant. If racers brought the correct dishes, they would receive their next clue, which directed them to the Pit Stop inside the restaurant.

Additional note

- This was a non-elimination leg.

=== Leg 9 (Poland → India) ===
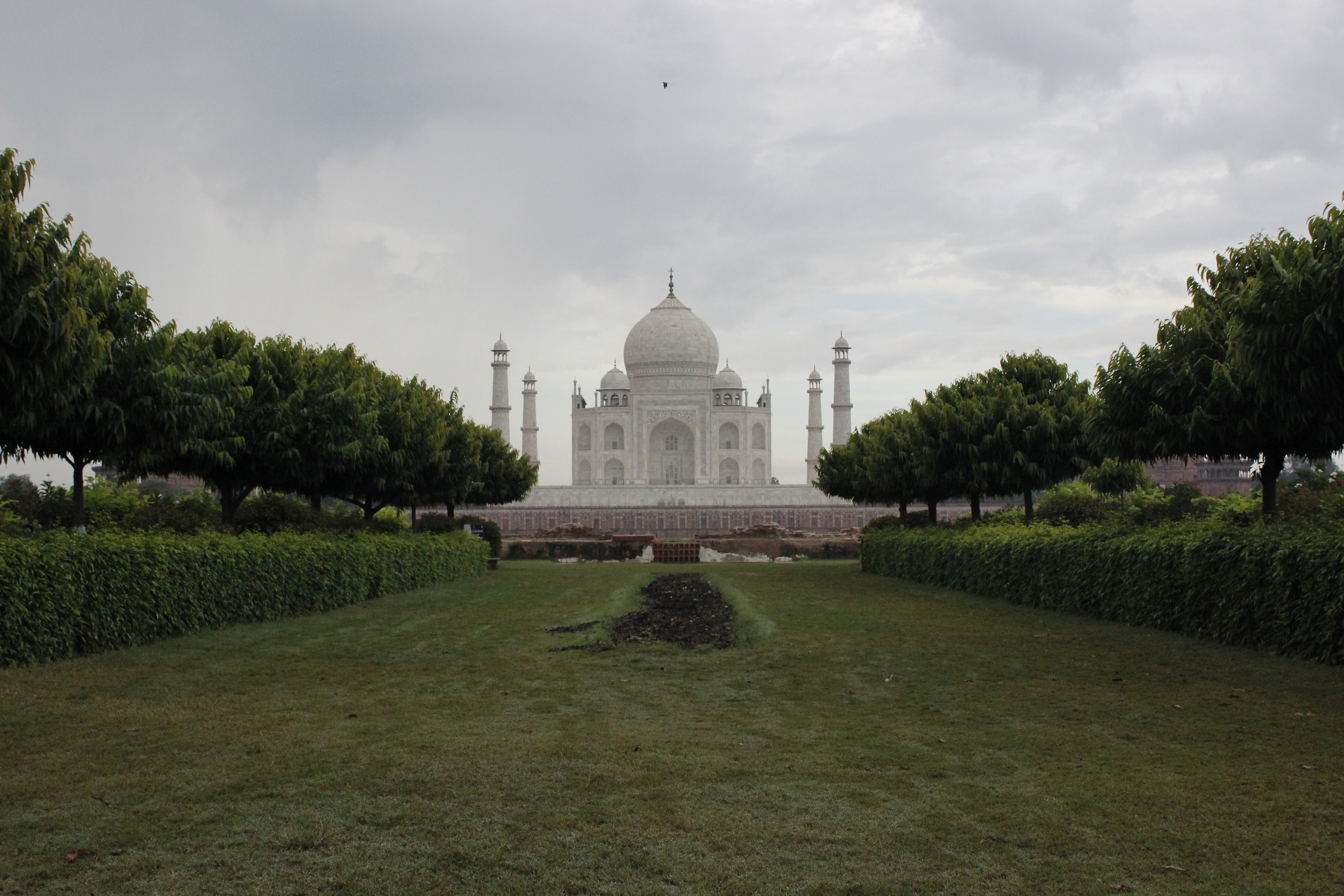
Mehtab Bagh in Agra, across the river from the Taj Mahal, served as the Pit Stop for this leg.

- Episode 9: "It's Always the Quiet Ones" (November 20, 2015)
- Prize: A trip for two to Honolulu, Hawaii (awarded to Justin & Diana)
- Eliminated: Tanner & Josh

Locations

- Kraków (Klezmer-Hois)
- Kraków → Delhi, India
- New Delhi → Agra
- Agra (Yamuna River – Hathi Ghat)
- Agra (Johri Bazar – Hanuman Temple)
- Mathura District (Chhata Bazar)
- Agra (Bijli Ghar Chauraha Roundabout)
- Agra (Mehtab Bagh)

Episode summary

- At the start of this leg, teams were instructed to fly to Delhi, India, and then travel by train to Agra. Once there, teams had to travel to Hathi Ghat along the Yamuna River in order to find their next clue.
- In this leg's Roadblock, one team member had to use a bicycle to transport a bundle of Indian saris to the bank of the Yamuna River, where they were shown how to tie them in a traditional manner for washing by a dhobi. Once all of the saris were correctly tied, racers had to wash them in a basin, transport them across the beach, and lay them out to dry in order to receive their next clue.
- For their Speed Bump, Tanner & Josh both had to perform the Roadblock, one after the other.
- After the Roadblock, teams had to travel to the Hanuman Temple in Johri Bazar, where they received a traditional Indian blessing before receiving their next clue.
- This leg's Detour was a choice between Cans or Candy. In Cans, teams had to load and secure 120 metal cooking-oil cans onto a flatbed bicycle and pedal to the New Taj Oil Company, where they had to unload the cans in order to receive their next clue. In Candy, teams had to cut small pieces from winter melons, which are used to make an Indian candy called petha. Once the pieces weighed in at one maund (90 lbs.), they had to deliver prepackaged petha to the Panchhi Petha Candy Store in order to receive their next clue.
- After the Detour, teams had to travel to the Bijli Ghar Chauraha Roundabout in order to find their next clue, which directed teams to travel to the Moonlight Garden – known locally as Mehtab Bagh – across the river from the Taj Mahal in order to find the Pit Stop.

Additional note

- Kelsey & Joey chose to use the U-Turn on Tanner & Josh.

=== Leg 10 (India) ===
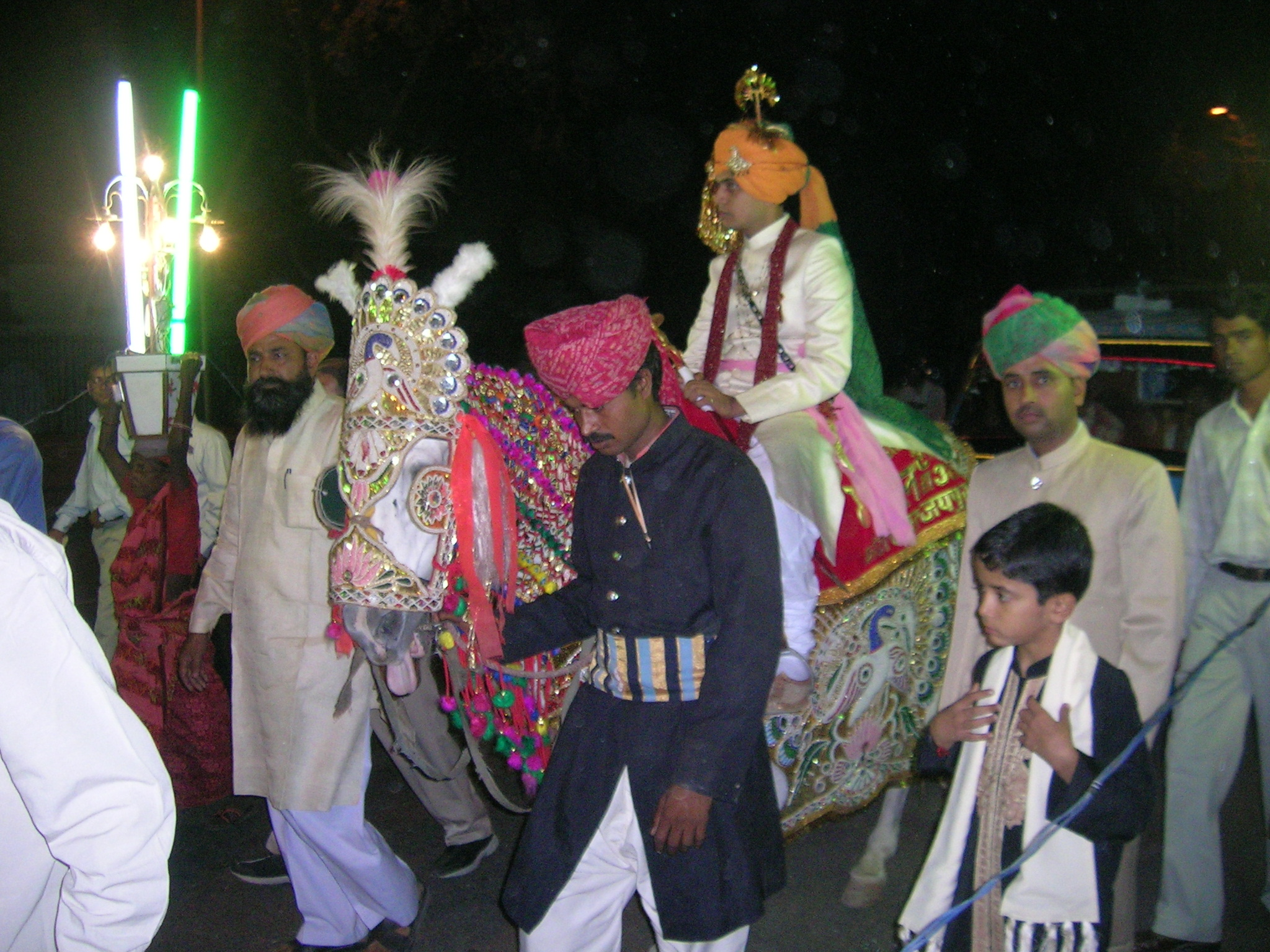
This leg paid tribute to the tradition of Indian Hindu wedding rituals, including the baraat.

- Episode 10: "Bring the Fun, Baby!" (November 27, 2015)
- Prize: US$5,000 each (awarded to Justin & Diana)
- Eliminated: Denise & James Earl

Locations

- Agra (Mehtab Bagh)
- Agra (Kachora Bazaar)
- Agra (Shri Raj Complex – Goyal Book Store)
- Agra (Shree Raj Complex or Rajeshwar Mandir)
- Agra (Shree Ramchandra Farm House)

Episode summary

- At the start of this leg, teams had to travel to the Kachora Bazaar in order to find their next clue.
- In this leg's Roadblock, one team member had to use a pump to inflate enough balloons to fill a net attached to the back of a bicycle. Once the net was full, they had to ride across the Yamuna Bridge, deliver the balloons to a wedding planner, receive their next clue, and then bicycle back to reunite with their partner.
- After the Roadblock, teams had to travel to the Goyal Book Store in order to find their next clue.
- This leg's Detour was a choice between Bring the Groom or Bring the Fun. In Bring the Groom, teams had to hand-crank a portable generator until it produced enough power to light up a cumbersome candelabrum. Teams then had to join a baraat procession through the streets, with one team member carrying the candelabrum while the other carried the generator, escorting a groom to his wedding party at the Shree Ramchandra Farm House in order to receive their next clue. In Bring the Fun, teams had to push a mobile amusement swing through the crowded streets, deliver it to the outside playground at the same wedding party, and give eight children a ride in the swing in order to receive their next clue.
- After the Detour, teams had to check in at the nearby Pit Stop.

Additional note

- Justin & Diana chose to use the U-Turn on Logan & Chris.

=== Leg 11 (India → Hong Kong → Macau) ===
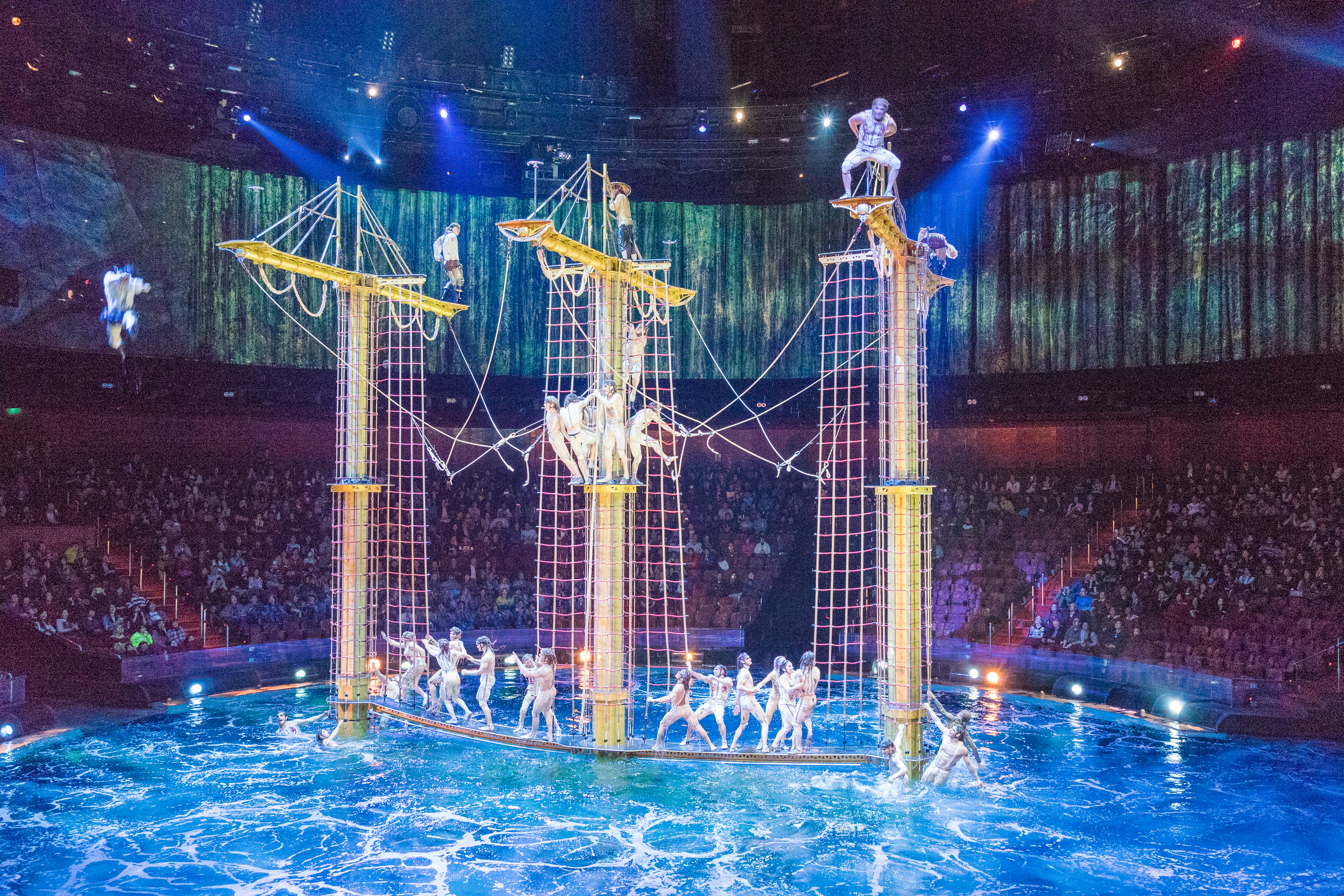
At the Dancing Water Theater in Macau's City of Dreams Casino, teams took part in a performance of The House of Dancing Water.

- Episode 11: "It's Not Easy Beating Green" (December 4, 2015)
- Prize: A trip for two to Cusco, Peru (awarded to Logan & Chris)
- Eliminated: Tiffany & Krista

Locations

- Agra (Four Points by Sheraton)
- Delhi → Hong Kong
- Hong Kong (The Peninsula Hong Kong)
- Hong Kong (Sam's Tailor & Sam's Workshop or Apliu Street & Kweilin Street)
- Hong Kong → Macau
- Macau (City of Dreams Casino & Dancing Water Theater)
- Macau (Centro Náutico da Praia Grande)

Episode summary

- At the start of this leg, teams were instructed to fly to Hong Kong. Once there, teams had to search outside the airport for a Rolls-Royce limousine to take them to The Peninsula Hong Kong, where teams found their next clue.
- This season's final Detour was a choice between Sam's or Cells. In Sam's, teams traveled to Sam's Tailor, where they picked up measurements for a suit jacket. Teams then headed to Sam's Workshop to properly cut out six template pieces of a matching design. They then had to deliver a finished suit back to Sam's Tailor in order to receive their next clue. In Cells, teams traveled to a marked store on the crowded Apliu Street and searched through boxes of used cell phones to find one that turned on. After dialing a number displayed on the phone, a message instructed them to travel to Kong Wah Telecom (HK) Limited on Kweilin Street in order to find their next clue.
- After the Detour, teams had to travel by ferry to Macau, and then travel to the City of Dreams Casino, where they had to search for a performer named Iago with their next clue.
- In this leg's Roadblock, one team member had to participate in a performance of The House of Dancing Water. After diving from the central platform into the surrounding pool, racers had to search underwater for a golden fish, swim across the pool, and deliver it to a fisherman on a raft in exchange for their next clue. If they could not complete the task before the music stopped, they had to wait twenty minutes for the next performance.
- After the Roadblock, teams had to check in at the Pit Stop: the Centro Náutico da Praia Grande, overlooking Nam Van Lake.

=== Leg 12 (Hong Kong → United States) ===
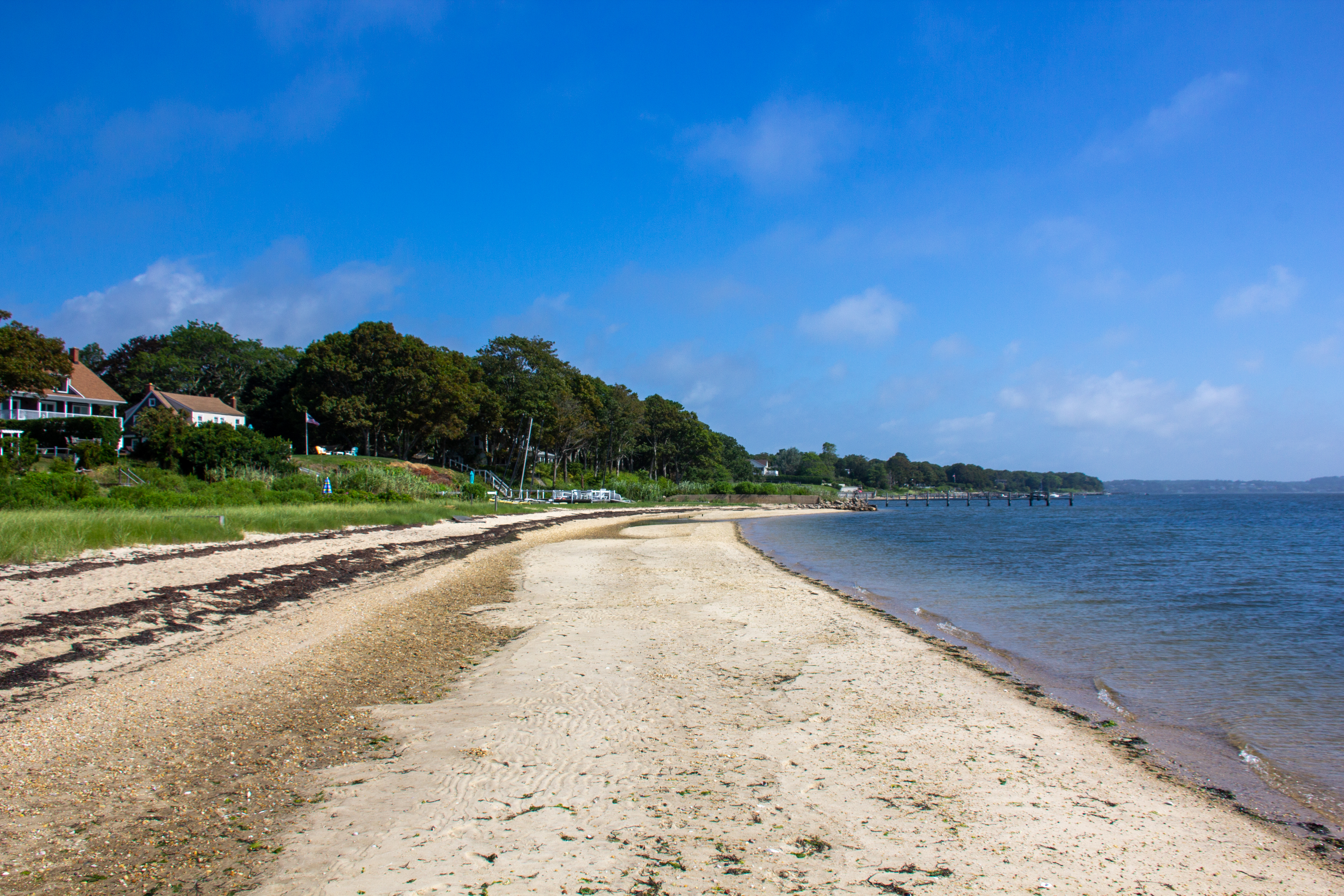
The final tasks of The Amazing Race 27 were set in the Hamptons of Long Island.

- Episode 12: "We Got a Chance, Baby!" (December 11, 2015)
- Prize: US$1,000,000
- Winners: Kelsey & Joey
- Runners-up: Justin & Diana
- Third place: Logan & Chris

Locations

- Hong Kong (Conrad Hong Kong)
- Hong Kong → New York City, New York
- New York City (Randall's Island – FDNY Fire Academy)
- Elmont (Belmont Park) → Southampton (Southampton Heliport)
- Southampton (Shinnecock East County Park)
- Southampton (Shinnecock Bay)
- Southampton (Cooper's Beach)
- Southampton (1620 Meadow Lane)

Episode summary

- At the start of this leg, teams were instructed to fly to Long Island, New York. Once there, teams had to travel to the FDNY Fire Academy at Randall's Island and find their next clue.
- In this season's final Roadblock, one team member had to don a New York City Fire Department uniform and take part in a training exercise. They first had to carry a fire hose to a fire engine, and then climb a ladder to the open window of a burning building, where they had to search inside for a dummy. Once they exited the building with the dummy, they had to place it onto a waiting stretcher. Afterwards, racers had to arrange firefighters' helmets, each labeled with the capital cities of the countries they'd visited, in chronological order, in order to receive their next clue.

Country	Capital
Brazil	Brasília
Argentina	Buenos Aires
Zambia	Lusaka
Zimbabwe	Harare
France	Paris
Netherlands	Amsterdam
Poland	Warsaw
India	New Delhi
China	Beijing

- After the Roadblock, teams were instructed to travel to the location of the final race of the Triple Crown: Belmont Park. There, teams traveled by helicopter to Southampton in the Hamptons. After landing at Southampton Heliport, teams found their next clue, which directed them to Shinnecock East County Park. Teams had to drive a Sea-Doo to a lobster boat, where they had to pull seven lobster traps from the water, empty them, and replace them with new traps. Once this was completed, teams received a box containing the flags of all of the countries they'd visited (along with one decoy flag), which they had to arrange in chronological order in order to receive their next clue and head back to shore.

Order	Flag
1	United States
2	Brazil
3	Argentina
4	Zambia
5	Zimbabwe
6	France
7	Netherlands
8	Poland
9	India
10	China

- When the lobster boats neared the shore, teams had to swim to shore and drive a dune buggy down the beach. They had to properly assemble six Adirondack chairs painted with objects encountered during the season and arrange them in chronological order – water bike, tango dancers, lion, windmill, Taj Mahal, and Rolls-Royce – in order to receive their final clue, which directed teams to travel on foot to the nearby finish line.

== Production ==
=== Development and filming ===
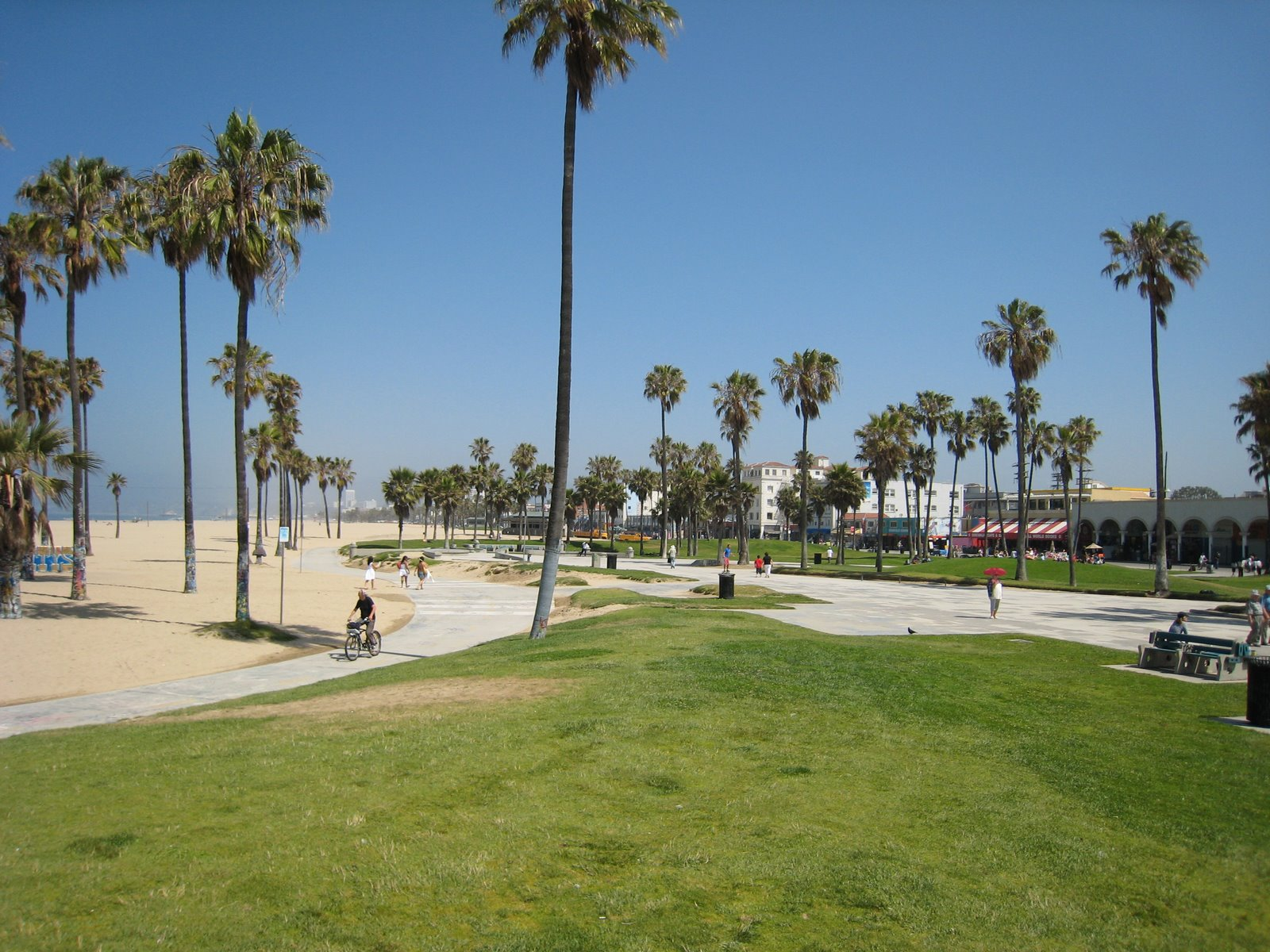
The 27th season of The Amazing Race started filming on June 22, 2015, at Venice Beach in Los Angeles.

Similar to The Amazing Race 25, the show's Twitter page announced an open start at Venice Beach in Los Angeles, California, and invited fans to join in sending the new teams off on June 22, 2015. The open start revealed that teams would first head to Rio de Janeiro, Brazil. Filming concluded on July 14 in the Hamptons of Long Island in New York.

This season covered 34,000 miles (55,000 km) across five continents and 10 countries, including a first-time visit to Zimbabwe.

== Reception ==
=== Critical response ===
The Amazing Race 27 received mixed reviews. Jodi Walker of Entertainment Weekly called this season "a pretty odd season of The Amazing Race." Whitney McIntosh of Uproxx called this season "subpar at best, with many of the teams boring audiences or just completely botching the race tasks altogether". Luke Gelineau of TV Equals called it "one of the most frustrating seasons in recent memory, with some of the dumbest and most clueless teams in Race history". In 2016, this season was ranked 19th out of the first 27 seasons by the Rob Has a Podcast Amazing Race correspondents. In 2024, Rhenn Taguiam of Game Rant placed this season within the bottom 13 out of 36.

=== Ratings ===
U.S. Nielsen ratings

No.	Title	Air date	Rating/share (18–49)	Viewers (millions)	DVR (18–49)	DVR viewers (millions)	Total (18–49)	Total viewers (millions)	Ref
1	"A Little Too Much Beefcake"	September 25, 2015	1.2/5	5.82	0.8	2.29	2.0	8.11	
2	"Get in There and Think Like a Dog"	October 2, 2015	1.2/5	5.98	—N/a	—N/a	—N/a	—N/a	
3	"Where My Dogs At?"	October 9, 2015	1.1/5	5.92	—N/a	—N/a	—N/a	—N/a	
4	"Good Old Fashioned Spit In The Face"	October 16, 2015	1.1/5	5.92	—N/a	—N/a	—N/a	—N/a	
5	"King of the Jungle"	October 23, 2015	1.2/5	5.94	—N/a	—N/a	—N/a	—N/a	
6	"My Tongue Doesn't Even Twist That Way"	October 30, 2015	1.2/5	6.07	—N/a	—N/a	—N/a	—N/a	
7	"Full Speed Ahead, Captain!"	November 6, 2015	1.1/4	5.83	—N/a	—N/a	—N/a	—N/a	
8	"Krakow, I'm Gonna Get You"	November 13, 2015	1.1/4	5.68	—N/a	—N/a	—N/a	—N/a	
9	"It's Always the Quiet Ones"	November 20, 2015	1.0/4	6.03	0.7	—N/a	1.7	—N/a	
10	"Bring the Fun, Baby!"	November 27, 2015	1.0/4	5.53	—N/a	—N/a	—N/a	—N/a	
11	"It's Not Easy Beating Green"	December 4, 2015	1.1/5	5.75	0.6	1.76	1.7	7.51	
12	"We Got a Chance, Baby!"	December 11, 2015	1.0/4	6.16	0.6	—N/a	1.6	—N/a	

Canadian ratings

Canadian broadcaster CTV also airs The Amazing Race on Fridays. Episodes air at 8:00 p.m. Eastern and Central (9:00 p.m. Pacific, Mountain and Atlantic).

Canadian DVR ratings are included in Numeris's count.

No.	Air date	Episode	Viewers (millions)	Rank (Week)	Ref
1	September 25, 2015	"A Little Too Much Beefcake"	1.42	23	
2	October 2, 2015	"Get in There and Think Like a Dog"	1.51	19	
3	October 9, 2015	"Where My Dogs At?"	1.52	21	
4	October 16, 2015	"Good Old Fashioned Spit In The Face"	1.46	23	
5	October 23, 2015	"King of the Jungle"	1.53	21	
6	October 30, 2015	"My Tongue Doesn't Even Twist That Way"	1.64	15	
7	November 6, 2015	"Full Speed Ahead, Captain!"	1.69	14	
8	November 13, 2015	"Krakow, I'm Gonna Get You"	1.55	19	
9	November 20, 2015	"It's Always the Quiet Ones"	1.52	22	
10	November 27, 2015	"Bring the Fun, Baby!"	1.59	14	
11	December 4, 2015	"It's Not Easy Beating Green"	1.69	8	
12	December 11, 2015	"We Got a Chance, Baby!"	1.64	10	

== Works cited ==
- Castro, Adam-Troy (2006). My Ox Is Broken!. BenBella Books. ISBN 978-1-932100-91-4.
