= List of hotels: Countries Y-Z =

This is a list of what are intended to be the notable top hotels by country, five or four star hotels, notable skyscraper landmarks or historic hotels which are covered in multiple reliable publications. It should not be a directory of every hotel in every country:

== Yemen ==
- Gold Mohur Hotel, Aden
- Sultan Palace Hotel, Sanaa

== Zimbabwe ==
- Harare International Conference Center
- Meikles
- Victoria Falls Hotel
