= Strathaven, Harare =

Strathaven
- Interactive map of Strathaven
- Coordinates: 17.7951654°S 31.0109115°E
- Country: Zimbabwe
- Province: Harare
- Municipality: City of Harare
- Main Place: Harare
- Established: 1902

Area
  - Total: 5.21 km^{2} (2.01 sq mi)

Population (2012)
  - Total: 19,197
  - Density: 3,680/km^{2} (9,540/sq mi)

Racial makeup (2012)
  - Shona people: 85.9%
  - Coloured: 3.4%
  - Indian/Chinese: 1.5%
  - White: 7.0%
  - Other: 1.3%

First languages (2012)
  - English: 28.6%
  - Shona: 71.0%
  - Other (mostly Ndebele): 0.4%
- Time zone: UTC+2 (CAT)
- Postal code (street): 52X-625X
- PO box: 4

Strathaven is a hilly suburb of Harare, Zimbabwe. Strathaven is an affluent north-west suburb, largely known for its retail and shopping amenities and is bounded to the west by the suburb of Sentosa, Monovale to the south and to the east and the north by Avondale and Avondale West.

Like much of the northwest, the streets feature tree-lined avenues, which give the area a distinctive, garden suburb feel.

== History ==
Strathaven was established in 1902 and named by Thomas Meikle of the prominent Scottish-Zimbabwean, Meikle family, after his hometown of Strathaven in Scotland. Thomas Meikle was one of the members of the infamous ‘Looting Committee’, created to steal Ndebele cattle, as punishment after the 1893 War of Dispossession or First Matabele War.

The majority of the cattle awarded to Meikle was used as capital for the Meikles business ventures which including the Meikles Hotel in Harare, Cape Grace in Cape Town and what was to become Strathaven. More than 350 000 cattle were looted by Meikle and his Looting Committee from the Ndebele people.

== Retail ==
There are several shopping centres and office parks in the area, especially along Suffolk Drive, which connects the suburb with the larger, Avondale. These include such as the Strathaven Shopping Centre, Amor Christian Trade Shopping Centre and the TM Supermarket head offices. Strathaven also has an emerging restaurant scene, with most restaurants and cafes amid the antique shops on Suffolk and Browing Drives. There is also an annual Spring festival on the opening weekend of September.
