= Sam's Tailor =

Hong Kong tailor

Sam's Tailor is a tailor in Hong Kong. It is noted for the roster of its clientele, which includes British royalty, American presidents, and international celebrities.

== History ==
The shop was founded by Sam Melwani in 1957, after he signed a contract to produce the uniforms of British soldiers stationed in Hong Kong. The shop is still run by his sons, Manu and Sham Melwani, as well as his grandson Roshan Melwani. It is located in Burlington Arcade on 94 Nathan Road, Tsim Sha Tsui, Kowloon, Hong Kong.

Clientele have included Queen Elizabeth II, Ronald Reagan, Prince Philip, King Charles, U.S. Presidents Gerald Ford, George H. W. Bush, George W. Bush and Bill Clinton, UK Prime Ministers Margaret Thatcher and Tony Blair. The tailoring shop also dressed celebrities such as Naomi Campbell, Bruno Mars, Russell Crowe, John McEnroe, George Michael, Michael Jackson, Boris Becker, Bob Hawke, Kylie Minogue, David Bowie, Mike Kane, Richard Gere, Michael McElligott and Luca Marchesi. Until the handover in 1997, it was one of the few official uniform tailors for British troops in Hong Kong, along with Yuen's Tailor, etc. Sam's Tailor was honoured with a postage stamp on the 50th anniversary of its founding.

During the COVID-19 pandemic, the shop began utilizing social media, to showcase their product, with comedic videos often featuring Roshan Melwani ripping the suits off young clients and smacking their buttocks. The shop currently has 1.6 million followers on TikTok and nearly 350K followers on Instagram.

== In popular culture ==
Michael Palin had his suit made there while doing his travel documentary, Around the World in 80 Days with Michael Palin.

The location was a site of the Detour in the eleventh leg of the reality TV show The Amazing Race 27 with Roshan Melwani making an appearance.

Richard Ayoade visited the shop and had a suit made with Jon Hamm in Travel Man.

== See also ==
- Hong Kong tailors
