= Shingi Munyeza =

Zimbabwean businessman (born 1966)

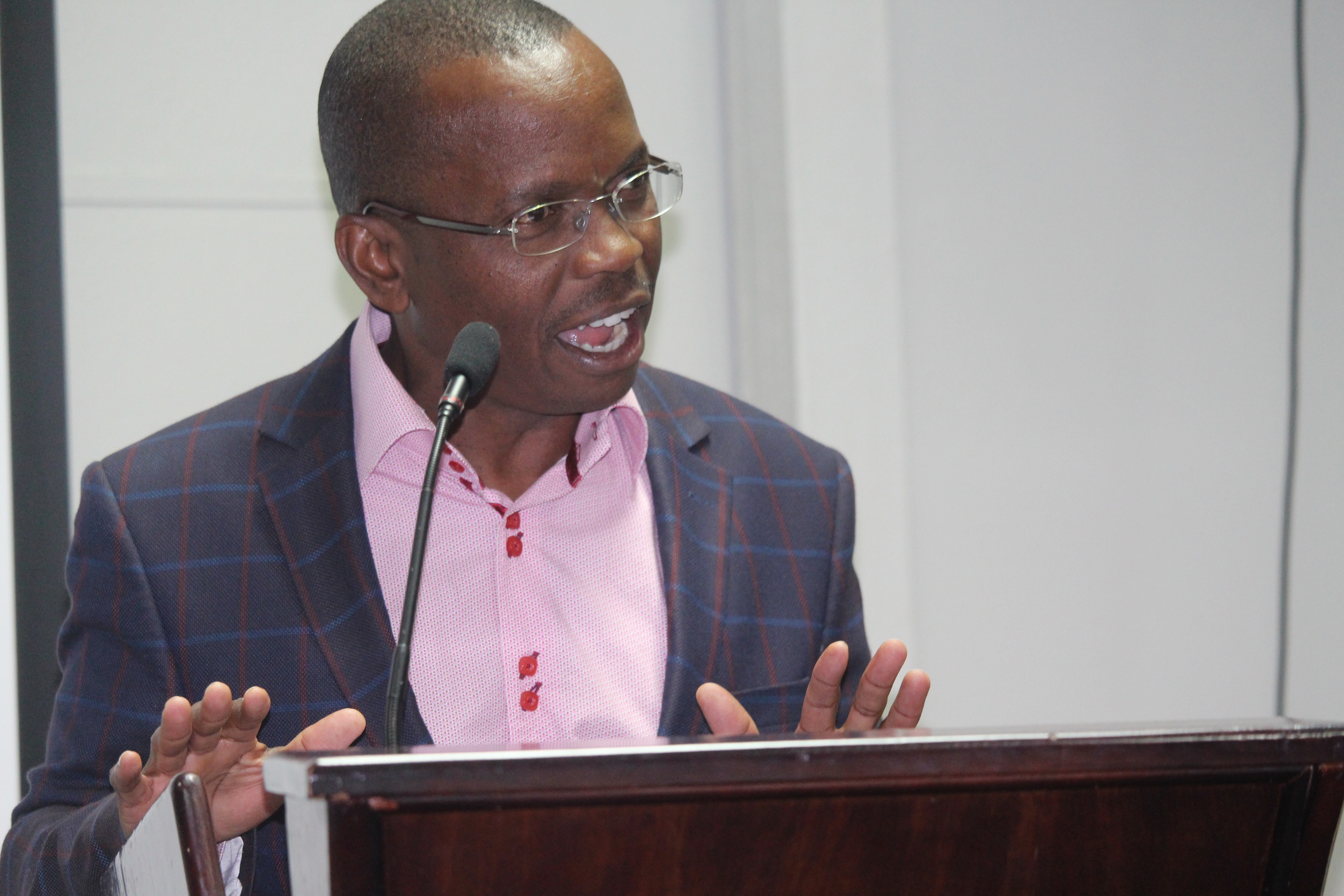
- Born: September 17, 1966 (age 59); Mazowe, Rhodesia
- Citizenship: Zimbabwean
- Education: Cornell University, Solusi University, University of South Africa
- Occupation: Businessman
- Organization: Vinal Investments
- Known for: Entrepreneurship, mentorship and business apostleship
- Spouse: Wilma Munyeza
- Children: 1
- Website: www.shingimunyeza.com

Shingi Albert Munyeza (born 17 September 1966) is a Zimbabwean businessman. He was the head of the Zimbabwean hotel chain, African Sun and stepped down in 2015 to pursue personal interests as part of his calling as a "marketplace apostle in advancing the kingdom of God".

== Early life and education ==
Munyeza was born to Fredrick Munyeza and Damaris Gwata, where he was the first born of six children. At the age of two, he moved to Inyanga to reside with his grandmother, later on attending primary school there at Tamunesa Primary School.

Munyeza moved to the capital city, Salisbury (now Harare) in 1978 where his parents had relocated to the neighbourhood of Marimba Park. He attended the rest of his primary school education at Mhizha Primary School in Highfield, Harare. Later, he went to St. John's High School in Emerald Hill, and then later Prince Edward School, both in Harare.

During his high school, he was head boy at St John's High School and later served as Junior Mayor of Harare.

He has diplomas in marketing and hotel management strategy, and was awarded an honorary business doctorate by Solusi University in 2010.

== Business career ==
After completing high school, he did his articles of clerkship under Ernst and Young, at the same time enrolled for a B.Compt in accounting with University of South Africa and also completed a Diploma in Applied Accountancy with the Institute of Accountants, Zimbabwe. He later went into advertising where he studied for an IMM Diploma in Marketing.

After a while, he moved to Zimbabwe Sun (now African Sun). While there, he studied for a Diploma in Hotel Management Strategy with Cornell University, New York. He was later conferred an honorary doctorate in Business Administration and Development by Solusi University in March 2010 in recognition of his contribution to business development in the tourism sector.

He trained as an accountant with Ernst and Young, then made a career change to advertising and worked as an Executive Director in an advertising agency, CM & A Advertising. He moved from advertising to tourism when he got a job at Cresta Hospitality Zimbabwe, where he became Group Commercial Director. After a while, he moved to then Zimbabwe Sun Limited (now African Sun) where he assumed the role of Group Chief Executive.

He introduced international food franchises in Zimbabwe before focusing on entrepreneurship. He established an enterprise incubator to support entrepreneurs in the country. He has also invested in the ICT, solar, and telecommunications sectors.

=== African Sun ===
Munyeza led a consortium of business persons into buying a stake in the largest hotel management company in Zimbabwe, ZimSun Limited, becoming the Chief Executive Officer in the process in 2002. He later purchased shares in the firm to become the major shareholder, and in the process renamed the company to African Sun Limited (ASL). The company began to expand regionally and it bought properties in South Africa, Botswana and Mozambique between 2009 and 2010. Some hotels in Ghana and Nigeria also became part of ASL during the same period. Munyeza secured about US$25 million to redevelop these hotels. Some of the hotels under African Sun Limited include Troutbeck Inn Resort in Nyanga, Holiday Inn Resorts and Hotels in Zimbabwe, Monomotapa Crowne Plaza in Harare, Elephant Hills Hotel in Victoria Falls, and the Cape Grace in South Africa. He was at Africa Sun Limited for 13 years (2002 – April 2015).

== Other positions ==
Past board seats:

- African Sun board
- Zimbabwe Council for Tourism President (2003–2005)
- FBC Bank board
- National Arts Council of Zimbabwe board
- Zimbabwe Tourism Authority board

Current board seats:

- Evangelical Fellowship Zimbabwe president
- University of Zimbabwe board member
- Southern Africa AIDS Trust Zimbabwe board member
- Patron of Harare Business Forum

== Recognition ==
- In 2017, he was awarded Lifetime Leadership Achievement Award by the Zimbabwe Institute of Management in recognition of contribution and dedication to developing and promoting best practices in management and leadership
- He was awarded as one of the most influential entrepreneurs after independence in 2013 by Empretec Zimbabwe. He is a recipient of the prestigious "Industry Mover and Shaker" award by the Hospitality Investment Conference Africa (HICA) in 2010 for his outstanding contribution to the hospitality industry across the African continent.
- Zimbabwe Tourism Authority Personality of the year (2008-2012)
- He was conferred an honorary Doctorate in Business Administration and Development by Solusi University in 2010, in recognition of his immense contribution to the development of tourism in Zimbabwe and across the African continent. He was also recipient of "Investing in Zimbabwe's future" debut Corporate Social Responsibility Award 2010 by American Business Association of Zimbabwe (ABAZ)
- CEO of the year 2008 (Institute of People Management Zimbabwe)
- He is the Institute of Directors award winner for 2008 and won the Tourism Personality of the Year for four years running from 2002 to 2005.
- Zimbabwe Outstanding young person award 2004

== Personal life ==
Munyeza is married to Wilma and they have a daughter, Nomsa.

== Religion and social responsibility ==
Munyeza has made notable contributions toward community transformation and has been a leader in initiating sustainable youth programs in disadvantaged communities in Zimbabwe targeted at young people through Faith Ministries Church where he was the senior pastor for 11 years (2006-2017). He is also involved in charity work under his church. He has assisted disadvantaged youths in various ways including giving bursaries to school children.

In January 2021, Munyeza was caught in an adultery controversy which shocked the country after his daughter exposed him on social media. This forced him to step down as the church's Senior pastor.
