= Southampton Heliport =

Airport in New York, United States of America

- IATA: none; ICAO: none; FAA LID: 87N

Summary
- Airport type: Public
- Owner: Incorporated Village of Southampton
- Operator: Mac Quarie Aviation
- Serves: The Hamptons
- Location: Southampton, New York
- Elevation AMSL: 5 ft (1.5 m)
- Coordinates: 40.846236°N 72.466363°W

Map
- Interactive map of Southampton Heliport

Helipads
Number	Length		Surface
Number	ft	m	Surface
1	44	13	Asphalt
- Source: Airnav

Southampton Heliport (FAA LID: 87N), also known as the Meadow Lane Helipad, is a public heliport in the village of Southampton, New York.

== Operations ==
Southampton Heliport is located at 2075 Meadow Lane near the western end of the peninsula. It is used in the summer by the wealthy to travel from Manhattan to their summer homes in The Hamptons.

== Airlines ==
Airlines	Destinations
Blade	Manhattan–W 30th St

== See also ==
- List of airports in New York
