= Thomas Meikle =

Thomas Meikle (4 December 1861 – 8 February 1939), born in Scotland, was a businessman and pioneer in Southern Rhodesia, the African country now known as Zimbabwe.

He travelled to Durban, Natal (in present-day South Africa), in December 1869 with his parents, his brothers John and Stewart and his sister Jeannie. He worked initially as a transport rider, then as a gold prospector, finally settling as a trader in Mashonaland. In 1894 he set up stores in Bulawayo and Gwelo (present-day Gweru) with his brother John, who pulled out of the venture two years later. He took over his brother Stewart's original idea to set up a chain of hotels, which culminated in the present day Meikles Hotel in Salisbury, today Harare.

He died at Hillside, Bulawayo on 8 February 1939 after a long illness, and was survived by his widow and four daughters.
