= Meikles Limited =

Conglomerate in Zimbabwe

Meikles
- Company type: Public
- Traded as: ZSE: MEIK
- Industry: Retail
- Founded: November 15, 1915 in Harare, Zimbabwe
- Headquarters: Harare, Zimbabwe
- Number of locations: 60 stores (2024)
- Revenue: ▼ZWG12,5 billion (2025)
- Website: www.meiklesltd.com
- Footnotes / references Financials as of February 28, 2025. References

Meikles Limited is a Zimbabwean national retail corporation that operators a chain of grocery stores, Meikles department stores, Meikles Mega Market stores, along with the Victoria Falls Hotel and security services. The company formerly owned the historic Hyatt Regency Harare The Meikles Hotel in central Harare.

Meikles runs the second biggest retail chain in the country, operating as TM Pick n Pay, which accounts for 99.6% of the company's revenue in 2024.

== History ==
In the late nineteenth century three brothers, John Meikle (1868-1949), Stewart Meikle and Thomas Meikle (1862-1939) emigrated from Strathaven, Scotland to South Africa. In 1892 the brothers opened a successful trading business in Fort Victoria in Victoria Province in Rhodesia. In 1915 Thomas Meikle opened a hotel in present-day Harare. Meikles had social and cultural prominence as the premier hotel in Harare.

=== H. M. Barbours ===
Barbours or H. M. Barbours, which continues as a department store in Harare, was founded by Irishman H.M. Barbour in 1917 as the first department store in the city then known as Salisbury, then capital of Rhodesia. Originally, the store was one story, and later two additional floors were added. After the death of Barbour in the early 1990s, his son inherited the store who sold it a year later to the Meikles family, who own the Meikles stores and other retail stores in the country. The Zimbabwe Business Times called the store "iconic". Customers have included former presidents Robert Mugabe and Canaan Banana as well as Renamo leader Afonso Dhlakama when visiting Zimbabwe the 1990s. The department store closed in 2019.

== Operations ==
Hotels

The company owned the Meikles Hotel until 2020, when it was sold for $20 million to Dubai-based Albwardy Investments. It also operates the Victoria Falls Hotel, in partnership with African Sun Limited.

Retail

Meikles Africa Ltd owns several department stores in Zimbabwe operating as Meikles. The company operates TM Supermarkets, operating under the name TM Pick n Pay, after its joint venture with South African retailer Pick n Pay. It has 60 stores nationwide, which supply everyday goods, and fresh produce to its customer base. It is the second biggest retailer in Zimbabwe, with new shops in Shurugwi and Hogerty Hill in Harare, with the company closing branches in Chegutu, Harare Street, and Southwold this year.

== Sources ==
- Bridger, P., House, M., and others, 1973. Encyclopaedia Rhodesia, College Press, Salisbury, Rhodesia.
