= Lightvessel No. 11 =

Lightvessel

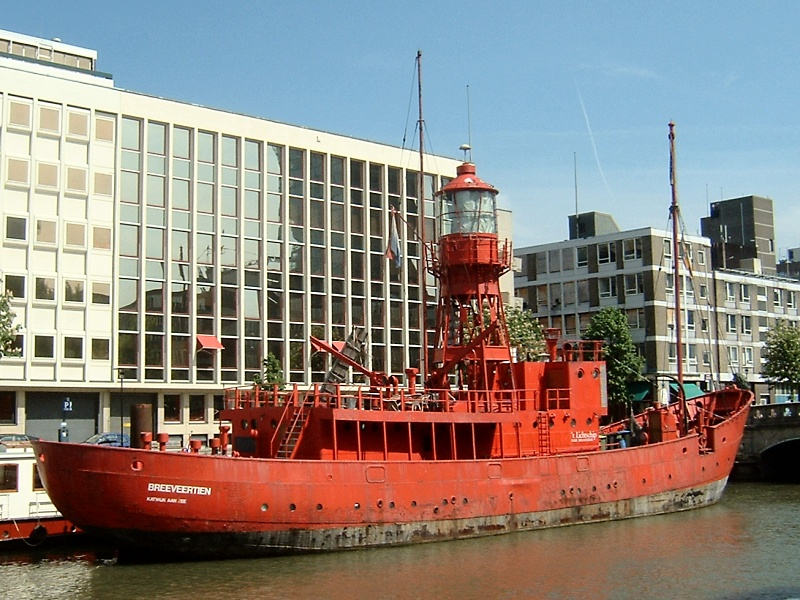
- Lightship No.11 Breeveertien in 2005

History
- Name: Gastro pub Vessel 11 (2013 - present); Restaurant Tinto (2009 – 2013); Breeveertien (1998-2008); Lightvessel No. 11 (1951-1995)
- Owner: Trinity House (1951-1991); Pounds Marine Shipping (1991-1995); Gus van der Loodt (1995-2008); Daniel Berg & Pottasch (2008 – present)
- Ordered: March 1950
- Builder: Philip and Son, Dartmouth
- Cost: £67,269
- Yard number: 1223
- Launched: 15 August 1951
- Status: Restored as a floating restaurant

General characteristics
- Length: 41.94 m (137.6 ft)
- Beam: 7.56 m (24.8 ft)
- Draught: 4.24 m (13.9 ft)

Lightvessel No.11 was a lightvessel that was in service in the Irish Sea from 1951 to 1988. She was built in 1951 for Trinity House by Philip & Son Ltd in Dartmouth, England.

She was used as a lightvessel near St Gowans Banks and Morecambe Bay before being retired on 21 October 1988. She was sold to Pounds Marine in 1991 for £20,000, arriving in Portsmouth on 16 July 1991. She was later sold to Gus van der Loodt in 1995, who had her towed to Rotterdam to convert her to a floating restaurant, opening as Breeveertien in 1999, moored in the Wijnhaven, Rotterdam, except for a brief period in April/May 2009 where she underwent a refit and restoration under new owners. On 1 November 2009 she became the Restaurant Tinto, and in 2014 a "British gastropub", now named "V11" or "Vessel 11", and still in the Wijnhaven.

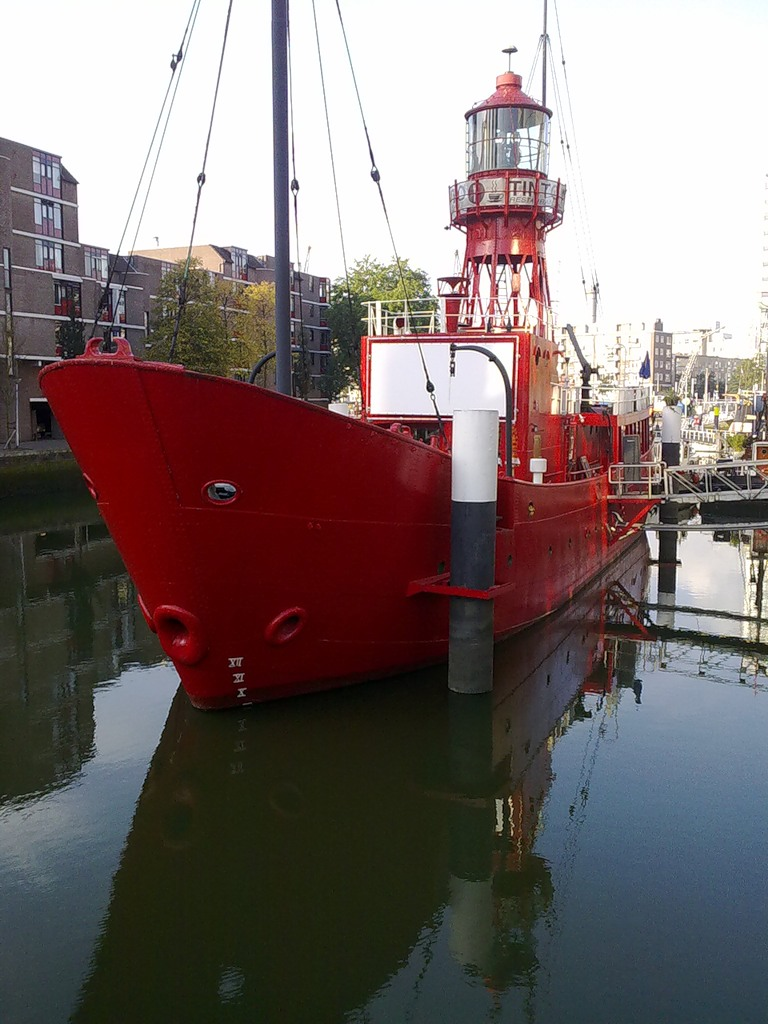

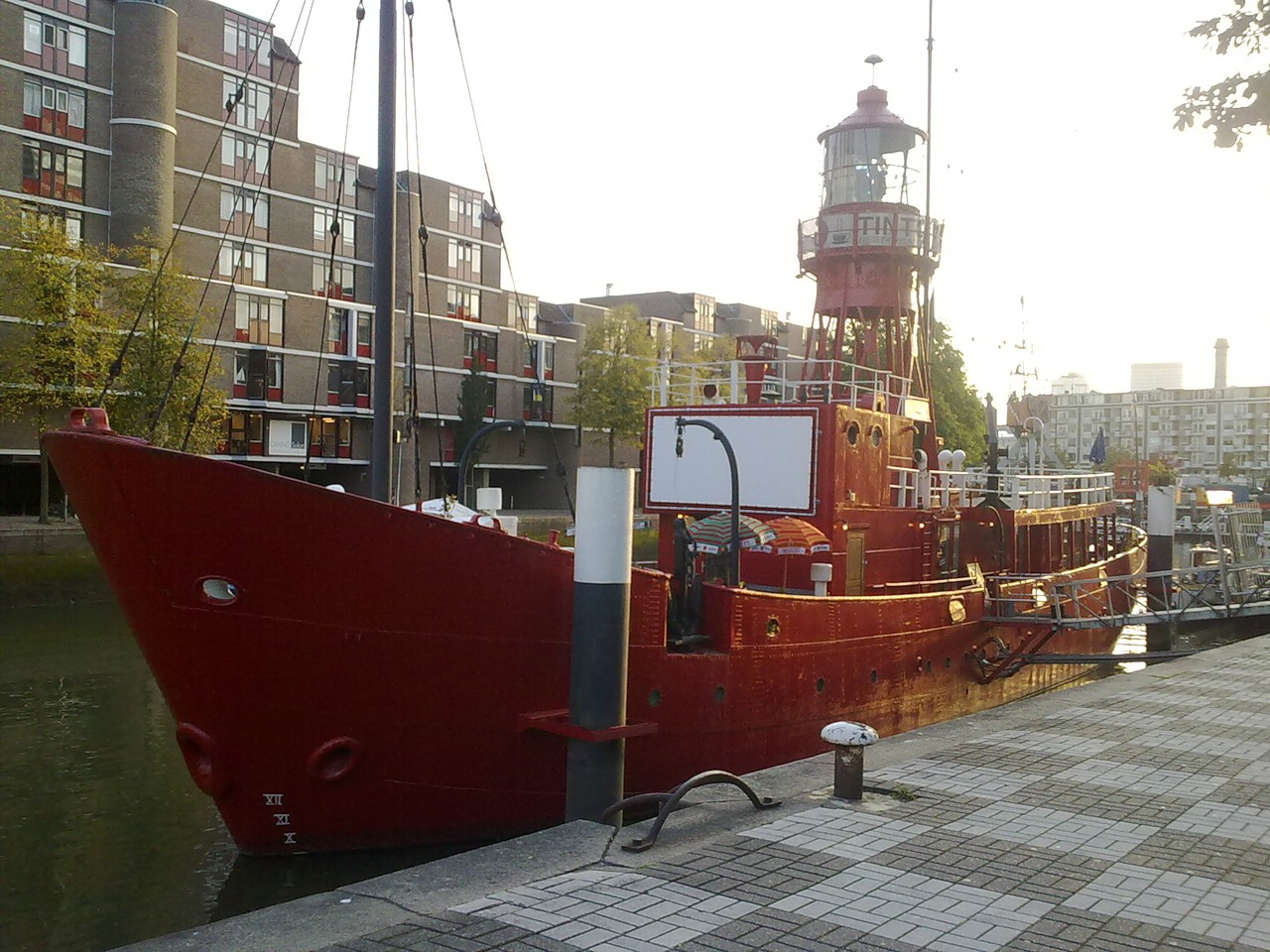

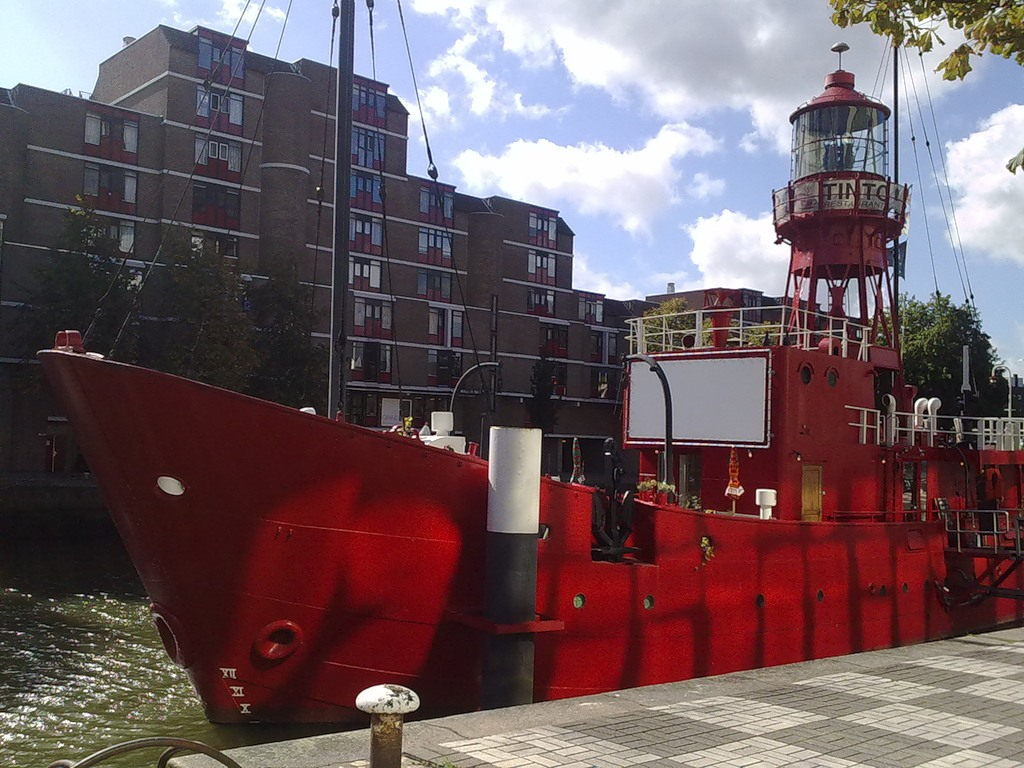
