= Victoria Falls Hotel =

Hotel in Zimbabwe

The Victoria Falls Hotel

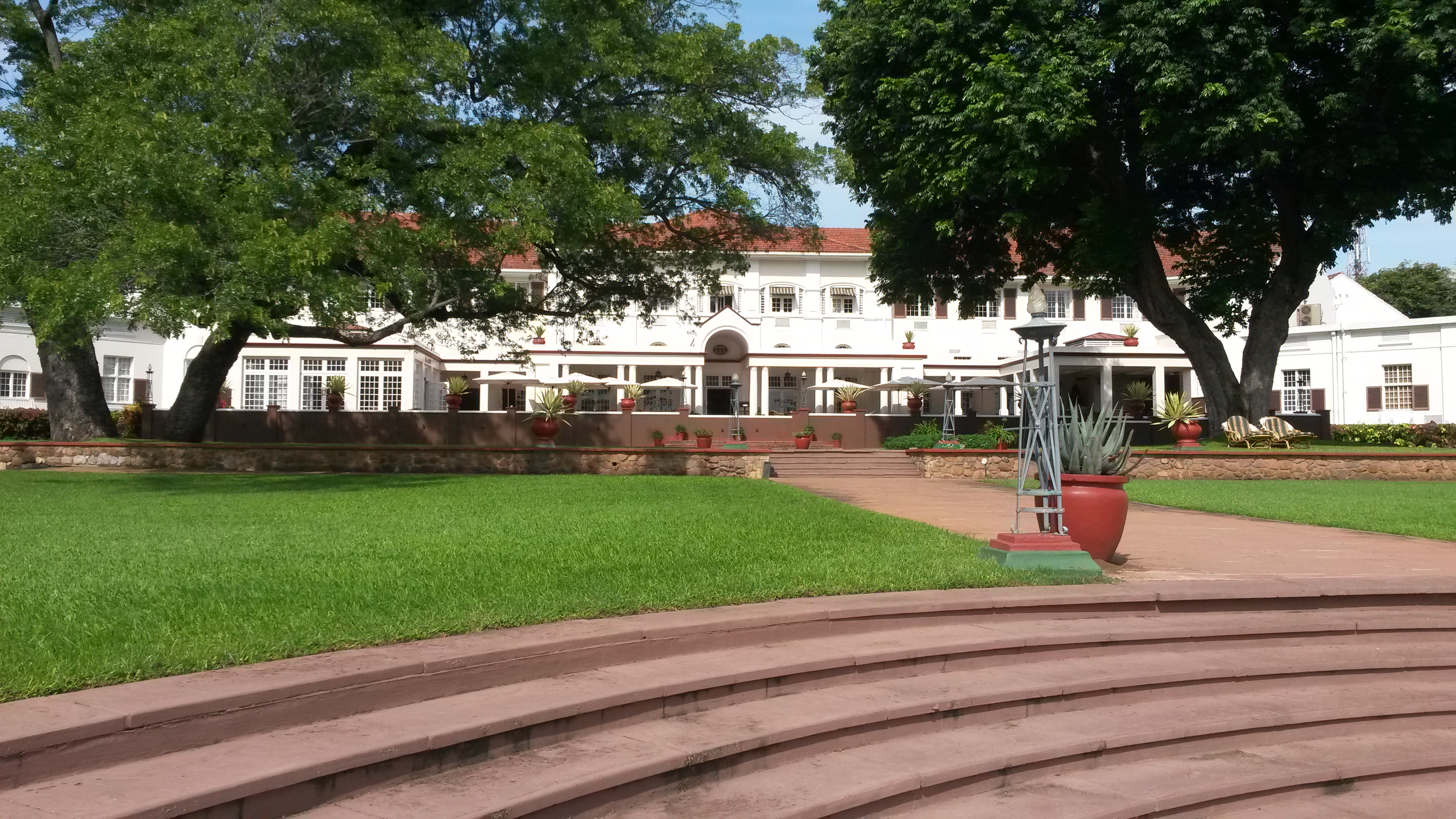
- Interactive map of the The Victoria Falls Hotel area

General information
- Location: 1 Mallet Drive, PO Box 10, Victoria Falls, Zimbabwe, Zimbabwe
- Coordinates: 17.9307°S 25.8426°E
- Opened: 1904
- Owner: National Railways of Zimbabwe
- Management: African Sun Limited & Meikles

Other information
- Number of rooms: 161

Website
- www.victoriafallshotel.com

The Victoria Falls Hotel is a historic luxury hotel at Victoria Falls, Zimbabwe, dramatically situated with a view of the Second Gorge and the Victoria Falls Bridge from its terrace.

It is a member of The Leading Hotels of the World marketing organisation and managed by African Sun Limited and Meikles.

== History ==
The hotel was opened in 1904 to accommodate passengers on the newly built railway of Rhodesia Railways Ltd, part of the planned Cape to Cairo Railway. Later it was a staging post for the BOAC flying boat service between Southampton and South Africa. In September 1904, Princess Christian of Schleswig-Holstein and her daughter, Princess Helena Victoria became the first royal guests of the newly opened hotel. The hotel has accommodated royal visitors on several occasions, including King George VI and his family in April 1947.

The hotel has been the site of a number of important political meetings. In 1949 Roy Welensky organised a conference there to discuss the creation of the Federation of Rhodesia and Nyasaland, and in 1963, the Victoria Falls Conference at the hotel led to the breakup of the federation.

It hosted the 1975 Victoria Falls Conference to try to sort out Rhodesia's Unilateral Declaration of Independence that followed the break-up of the Federation.

In 2022, the Anglican Church of the Province of Central Africa presented an award to the hotel for its stewardship of its in-house chapel, where weekly masses are held in addition to special services such as weddings.

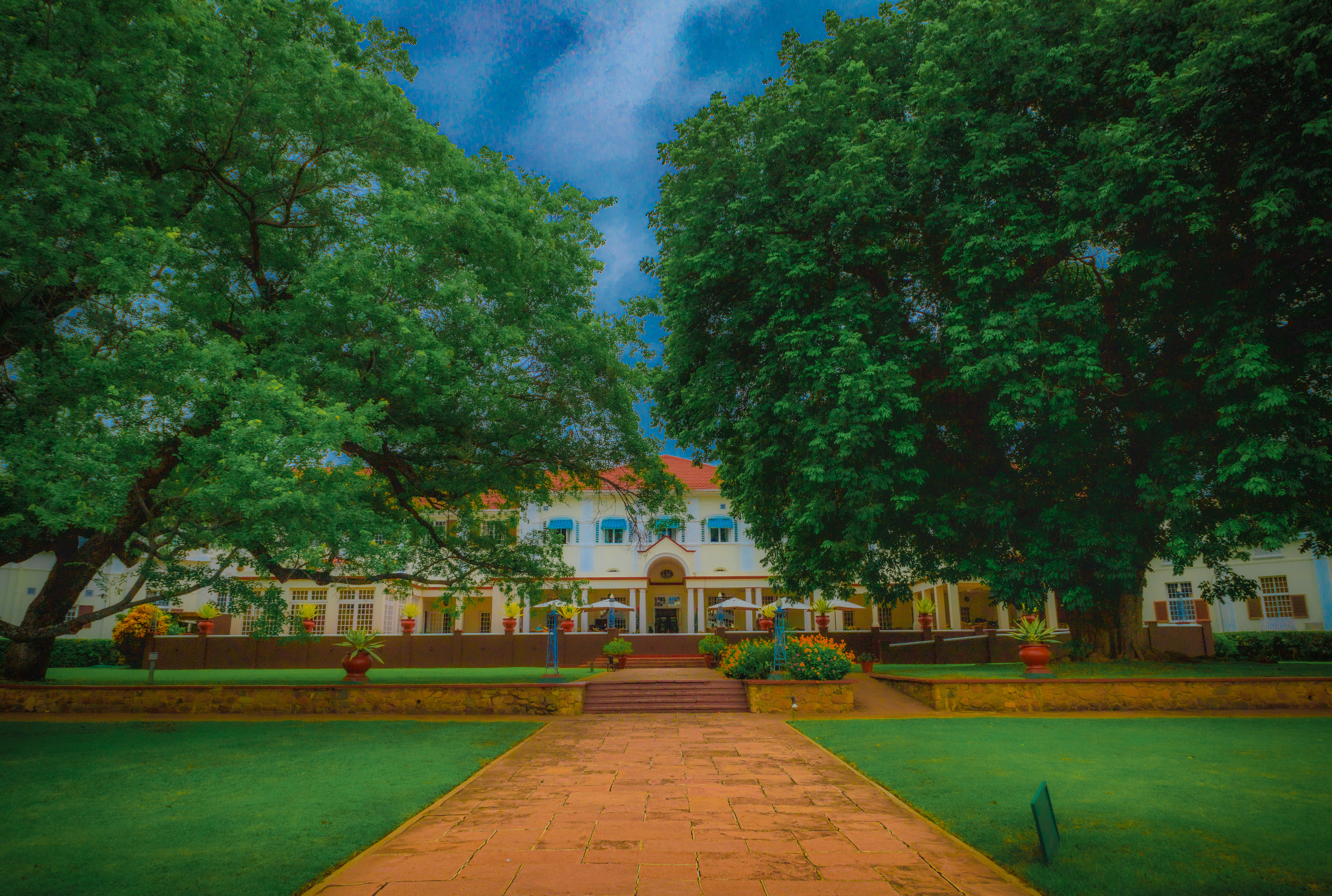
The Victoria Falls Hotel
