= African Sun =

Company based in Zimbabwe

AfricanSun
- Type: Public
- Traded as: ZSE: ASUN; Zimbabwe Industrial Index
- Industry: Hotels
- Founded: 1968
- Headquarters: Harare, Zimbabwe
- Key people: E.T Shangwa, CEO. Alex Makamure, Chairman
- Revenue: USD 35.2 million (2009)
- Number of employees: 2250
- Website: Africansunhotels.com

African Sun Limited, is a Zimbabwe based hospitality management company established in 1968. It operates in the hospitality and leisure industry through a number of hotels, resorts, casinos and timeshare operations throughout Zimbabwe and South Africa. It is listed on the Zimbabwe Stock Exchange and is a constituent of the Zimbabwe Industrial Index.

== History ==
The group spun off from the Delta Corporation in 2003 with Shingi Munyeza as CEO.

In 2011, African Sun retrieved from the management of The Grace hotel in Rosebank, Cape Town. By 2012, it managed 1,000 rooms. In 2009, Africa Sun welcomed the US President Barack Obama in its Holiday Inn-managed hotel at the Accra airport (in Ghana).

In January 2015, the company sold its hotels in Ghana and Nigeria, and announced a year later its withdrawal from regional operations to focus on its domestic market. In March 2015, Shingi Munyeza left and E.T Shangwa became the CEO.

In February 2016, African Sun paid a 200,000-dollar water bill to the municipality of Victoria Falls to clear its outstanding 383,000-dollar debt. In July 2016, African Sun bought 2,050 m2 of the Harare Gardens to extend the Crowne Plaza Momomotapa Hotel, a deal that was in the pipes since 2010. In October 2017, Brainworks, African Sun's holding company, was introduced in the JSE, the first Zimbabwe-based company to be indexed on the South African stock exchange. In July 2018, Nkala stepped down, and Alex Makamure was appointed new chairman of the board.

In 2018, the group's revenue grew 32% to 68.5 million dollars, and it spent 5.8 million dollars in refurbishments. In 2019, the Zimbabwe fuel protests led to revenue drops for African Sun.

In May 2019, African Sun terminated its deal with the South-African Legacy Hospitality regarding the management of 5 of its hotels. The deal was running since October 2015, and implied that Legacy Hospitality would refurbish the properties it would manage. The deal cancellation was justified by "disagreements", and African sun assured that Legacy Hospitality was actually not in charge of refurbishing the hotels under management. Two months later, Legacy Hospitality appealed the cancellation in court.
