= African women in engineering =

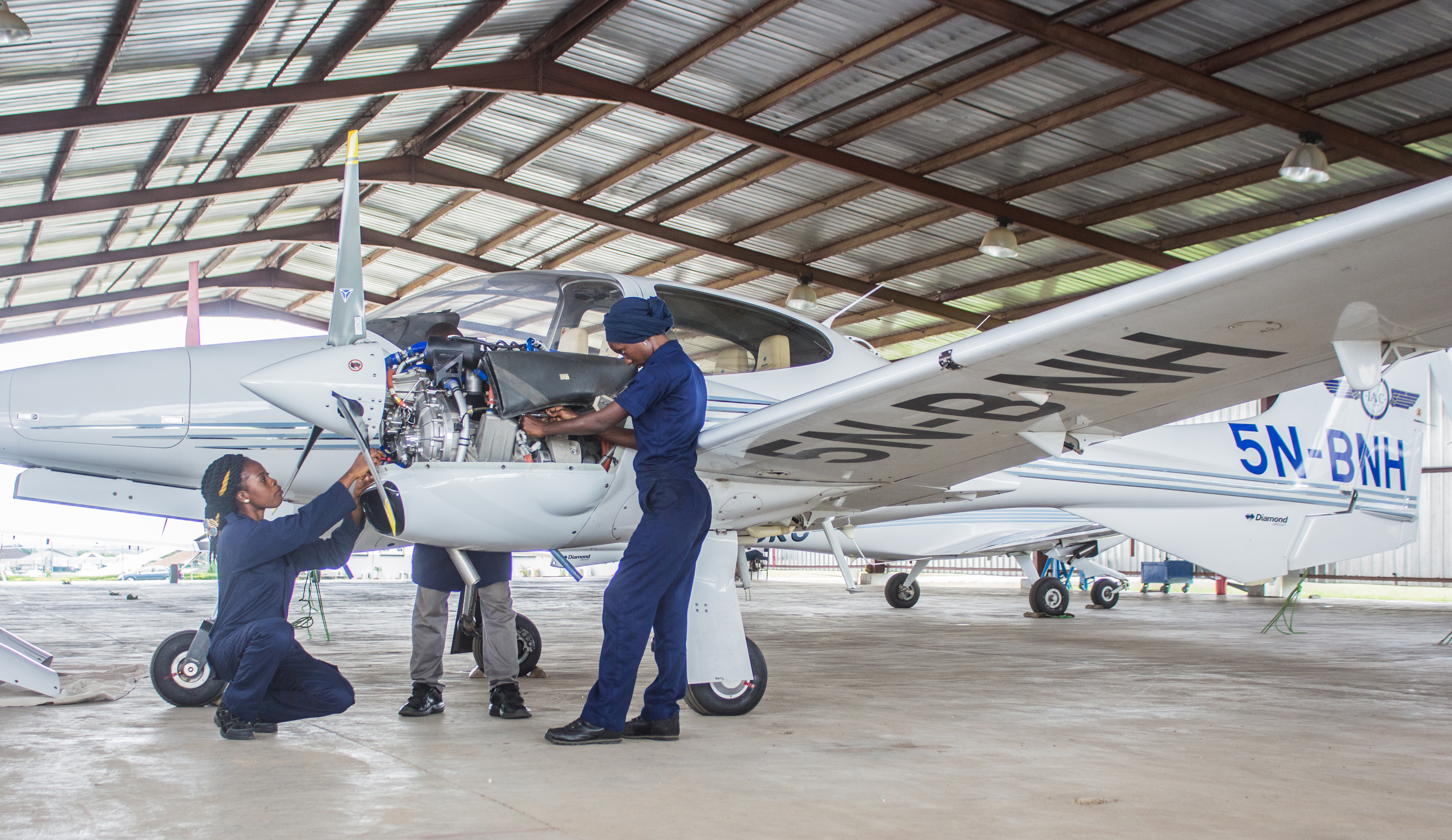
Female aircraft engineers, Kwara State, Nigeria.

Globally, women are largely under-represented in STEM-related fields; this under-representation is especially prevalent in Africa where women represent less than 20% of the workforce in these fields. African women in engineering and STEM related fields are more susceptible to discrimination and to be devalued in African countries. Regardless of this lack of representation in STEM-related work, there are many important female engineers from across the continent. Furthermore, a number of organizations within and out of Africa are working towards minimizing the disparity within the workforce.

== Notable African women in engineering ==
=== Northern Africa ===
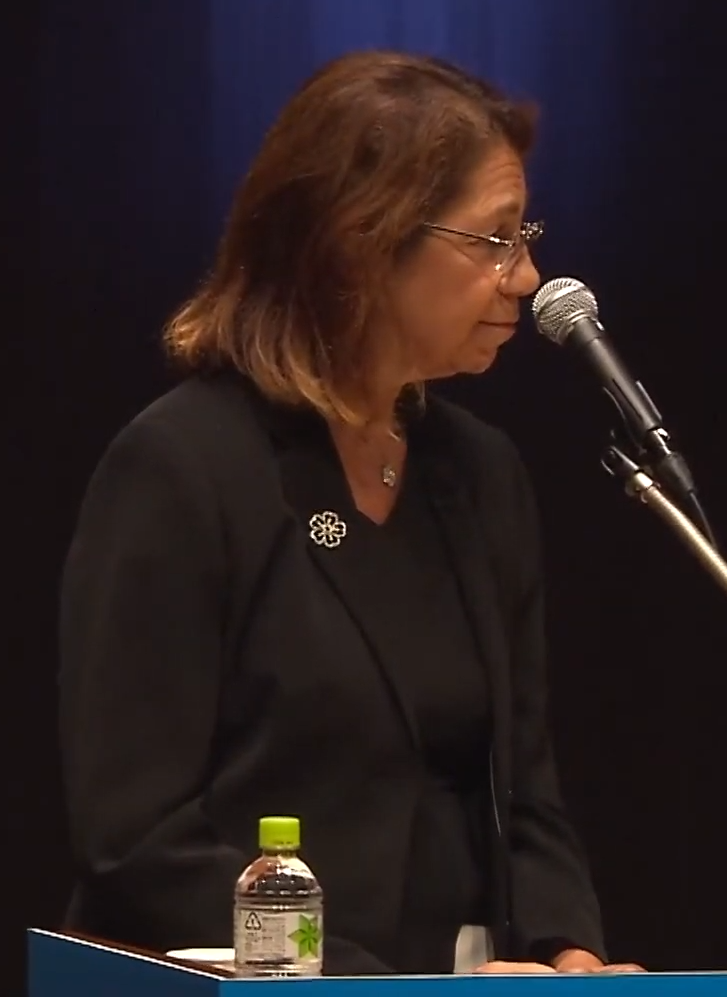
Akissa Bahri

Tyseer Aboulnasr is an Egyptian electrical engineer. She received her bachelor's degree from Cairo University and her master's and Ph.D. from Queen's University, Kingston, Canada. She was formerly the Dean of the Faculty of Applied Sciences at the University of British Columbia School of Engineering, as well as the Dean of the Faculty of Engineering at the University of Ottawa.

Akissa Bahri is a Tunisian agricultural engineer and previously a professor at the National Agricultural Institute of Tunisia. She studied at the National Polytechnic Institute of Toulouse to get her engineering doctorate, then obtained her Ph.D. from Lund University in Sweden in Water Resources Engineering.

Najla Bouden is a Tunisian geoscientist and current Prime Minister of Tunisia. She earned her Ph.D. in geological engineering from École des Mines de Paris. The president named her prime minister, and she took office on October 11, 2021, becoming the first woman to be a prime minister in the Arab World.

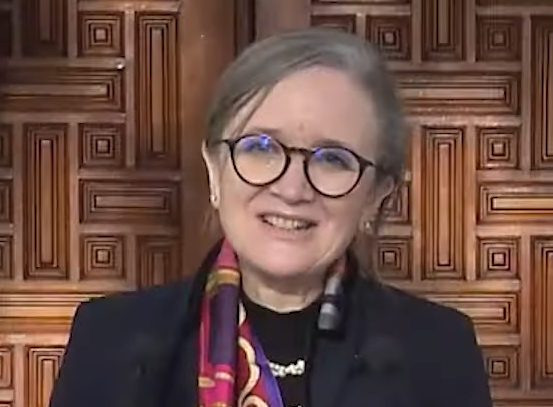
Najla Bouden

Zeinab Elobeid Yousif was a Sudanese aircraft engineer. She obtained her master's degree in aeronautical engineering from Kingston University in 1995. She was the first woman to receive this degree.

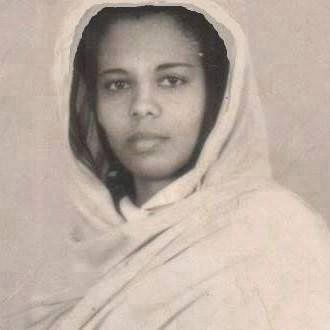
Zeinab Elobeid Yousif

Awatef Hamed is an Egyptian aerospace engineer. She is currently a researcher at the University of Cincinnati, studying jet-engine technology. Dr. Hamed is the first woman to head a college aerospace department. She began as the head of the University of Cincinnati's Aerospace Systems School in 2001 after studying there herself in 1968. She has received international recognition for her research examining turbine fan blades and their erosion due to air particles. She received over 25 million dollars in funding with the Ohio Research Scholar awards in 2008.

=== Eastern Africa ===
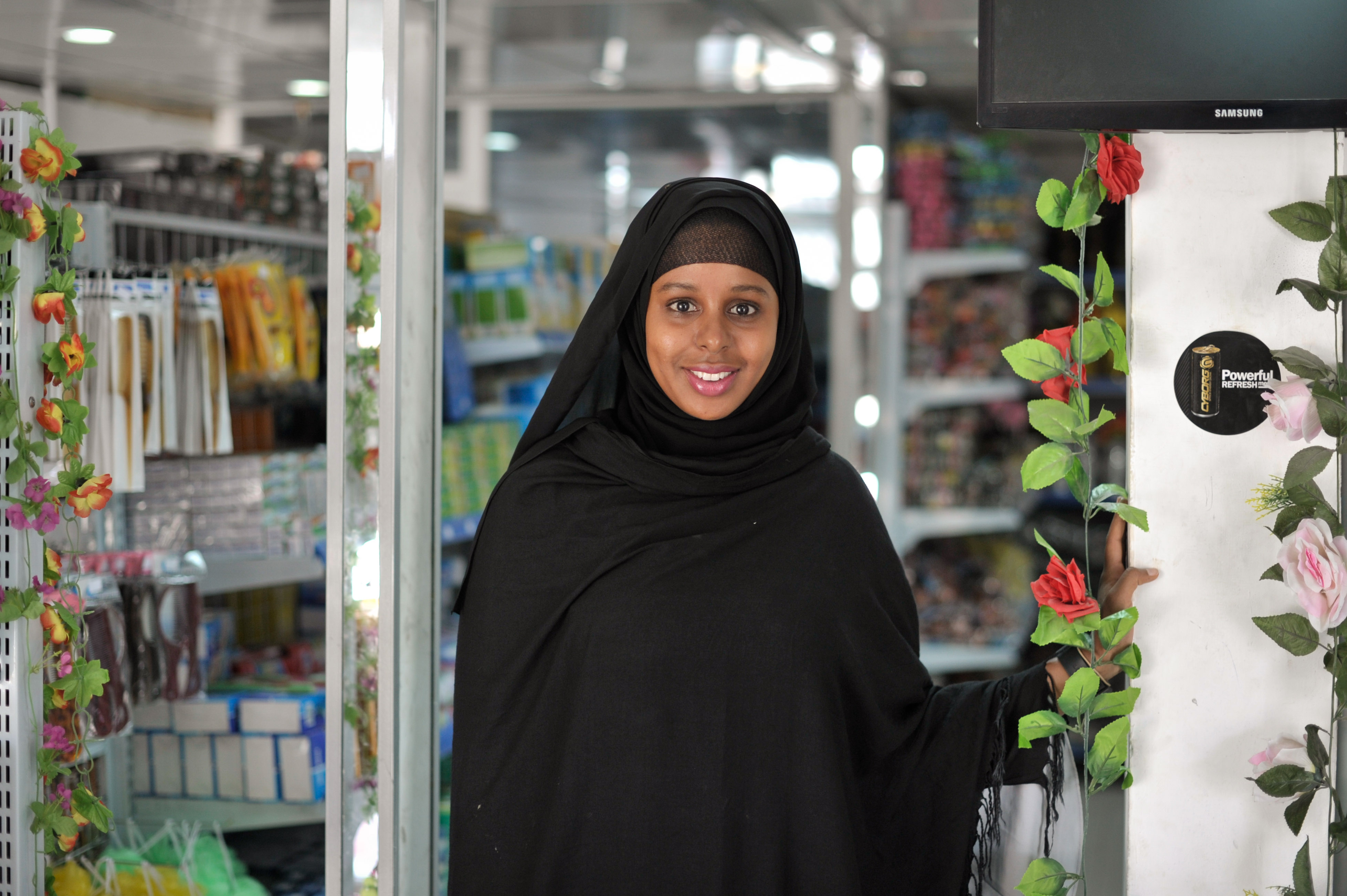
Nasra Agil

Nasra Agil is a Somali-Canadian civil engineer. She obtained a bachelor's degree in civil engineering from Ryerson University, marking one of the first recorded instances of a woman of Somali descent getting a degree in engineering in Canada.

Dr. Gertrude Mwangala Akapelwa is a Zambian IBM Systems Engineer. She obtained a bachelor's degree in mathematics and education from the University of Zambia, a master's degree in public administration from Harvard University, and a doctorate in higher education from the University of Liverpool. She helped establish and currently serves as Vice-Chancellor of Victoria Falls University of Technology.

Winnie Byanyima is a Ugandan aeronautical engineer. She obtained her bachelor's degree in aeronautical engineering from the University of Manchester. She became the first Ugandan woman to get a degree in this field; she received a master's degree in mechanical engineering from Cranfield University. She currently serves as the executive director for UNAIDS after being appointed in 2019.

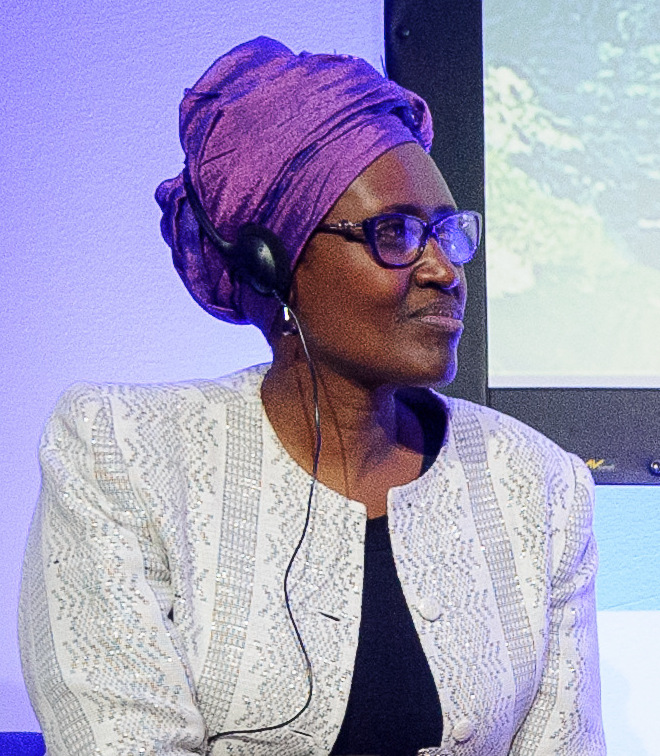
Winnie Byanyima

Natalie Payida Jabangwe is a Zimbabwean computer engineer. She obtained a bachelor's degree in computer engineering from Middlesex University and a master's degree in business administration from Imperial College London. A French institute named her one of the "100 Africa Economic Leaders for Tomorrow" in 2018.

Germaine Kamayirese is a Rwandan electromechanical engineer. She obtained a bachelor's degree in electrical mechanical engineering from the Kigali Institute of Science and Technology and was awarded a master's in communications management by KIST and Coventry University. In 2014, she was appointed as Minister of State for Infrastructure for Energy, Water, and Sanitation; she managed sanitation efforts, power production, and other aspects of Rwanda's infrastructure.

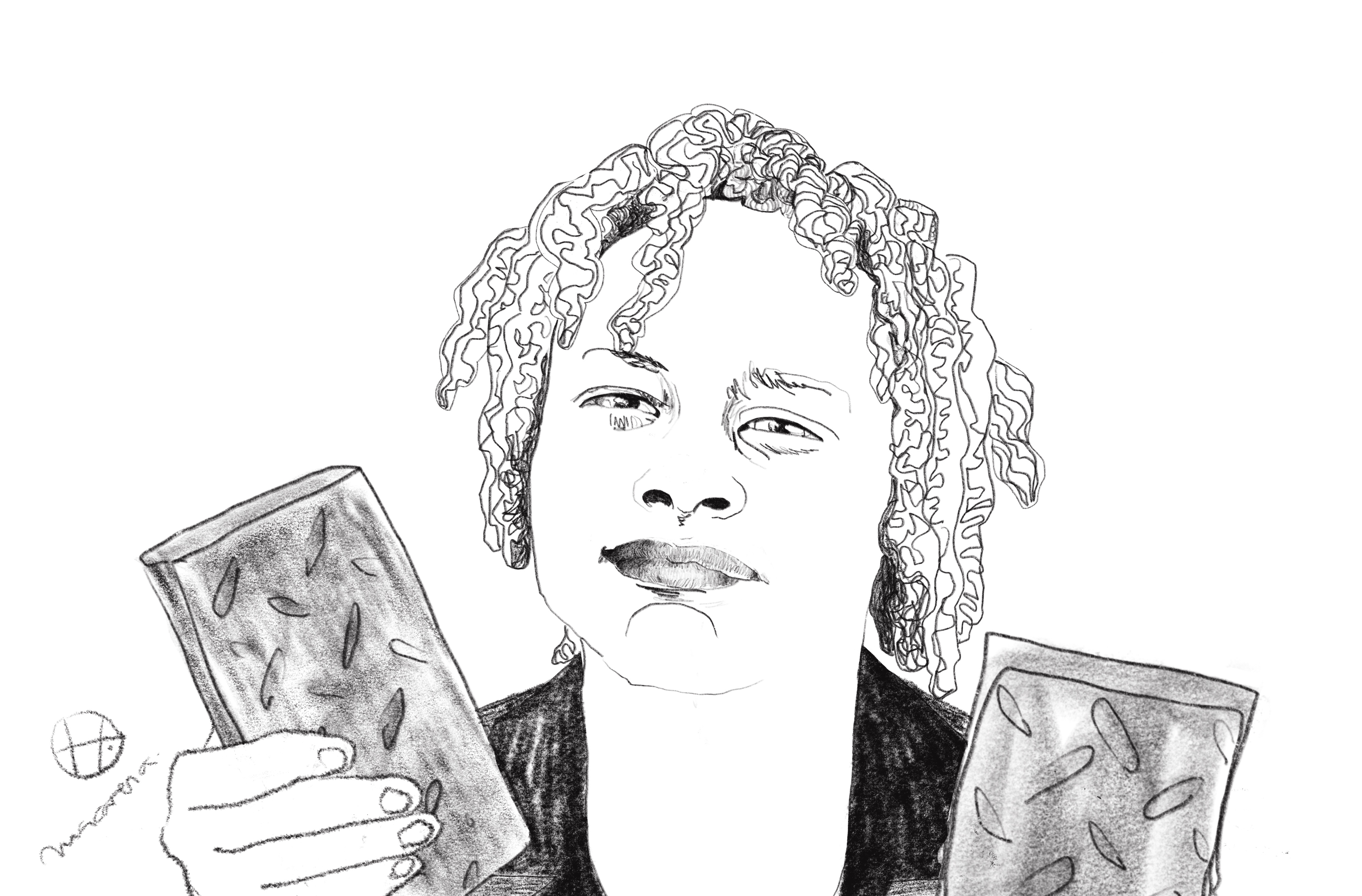
Nzambi Matee

Frannie Léautier is a Tanzanian civil engineer. She obtained her bachelor's degree in civil engineering from the University of Dar es Salaam, her master's in transportation, and her Ph.D. in Civil Engineering from the Massachusetts Institute of Technology. From the early 90s to the late 2000s, she worked for the World Bank taking charge of the World Bank Institute in the last six years.

Nzambi Matee is a Kenyan civil engineer. She obtained her bachelor's degree in applied physics at the Jomo Kenyatta University of Agriculture and Technology. In 2017, she quit her job as a data analyst and founded Gjenge Makers, which focuses on turning difficulty to recycle plastics into bricks stronger than concrete.

Dr. Marie Chantal Cyulinyana currently holds the position of Science and Technology Foresight Analyst at the Rwanda National Council for Science and Technology (NCST). In this role, she analyzes current trends and future needs in Science and Technology (S&T) and provides policy recommendations in the field. Before joining NCST, Dr. Cyulinyana served as a Physics lecturer at the University of Rwanda (UR) College of Science and Technology (UR-CST) from 2011 to 2021. She remains affiliated with UR-CST as an honorary lecturer in the Physics Department.

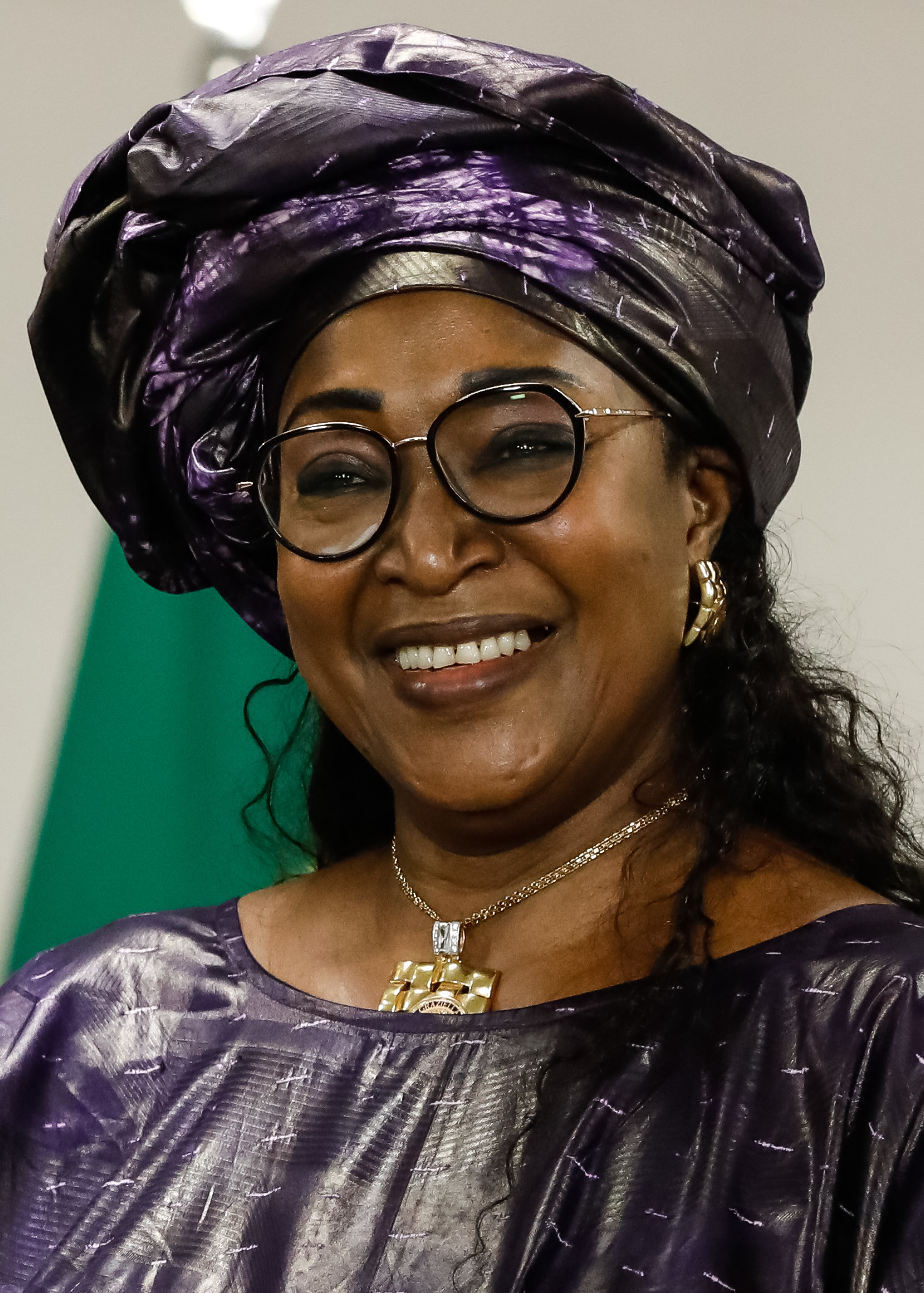
Ndèye Tické Ndiaye Diop

=== Central Africa ===
Therese Izay-Kirongozi is a Congolese industrial engineer. She studied at the Higher Institute of Applied Techniques. She is best known as the creator of humanoid traffic robots that aid with traffic regulation in Kinshasa, the capital of the Democratic Republic of the Congo.

Dr. Ngalula Mubenga is a Congolese electrical engineer. She obtained her bachelor's, master's, and doctoral degrees in electrical engineering from the University of Toledo. In 2017 she was appointed by the president of the Democratic Republic of the Congo as a member of the board of directors for the country's national electric utility company, Société Nationale d'Électricité.

Mbu Waindim is a Cameroonian woman who obtained her advanced level certificate from Saker Baptist College. She then went on to earn a bachelor's degree in aerospace engineering and mathematical science in 2012. After, she obtained a master's and Ph.D. from Ohio State University in aerospace engineering and became the first Cameroonian woman to do so. She has worked at NASA and for the United States Airforce.

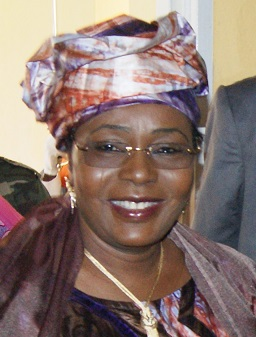
Aissata Issoufou

=== Southern Africa ===
Veliswa Boya is one of South Africa's first cloud engineers. She serves as the senior developer advocate and developer relations lead in the Sub-Saharan sector of Africa at Amazon Web Services. She works with and targets developers in the sub-Saharan Africa region - to help the area develop many more engineers. Boya's background stems from various areas such as engineering, architecture, consulting, and analyzing. She has written her first Associate level (Solution Architect) and passed a second Associate level Developer award. She received the opportunity when Standard Bank partnered with AWS, allowing Boya to help with everything cloud, including the strategies, migration planning, and cloud architecture design.

Bavelile Hlongwa practiced chemical engineering in South Africa and became the Deputy Minister of Mineral Resources and Energy in 2019. In addition to her engineering career, she was active in politics as a member of the African National Congress. She became a member of the National Assembly of South Africa in 2019 and continued her service until her death later that year.

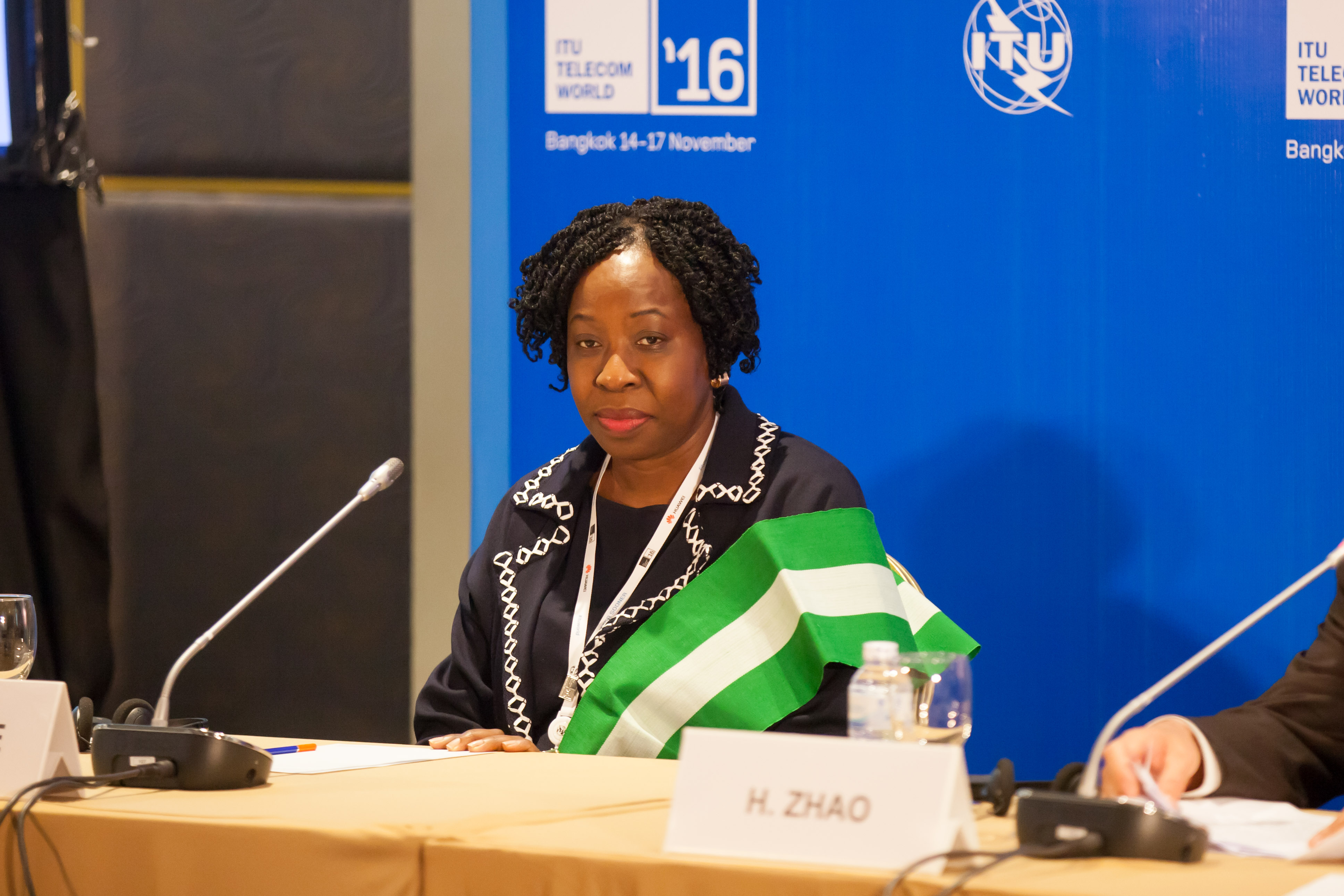
Funke Opeke

Hilary Kahn (1943–2007). Born and grew up in South Africa but moved to Newcastle, England to start her university education, initially in the classics but graduated 1965 in computing, from the University of Newcastle. She learned to work with the KDF 9 computer and ALGOL and later worked for Manchester University on COBOL and computer-aided design and software engineering, which she continued to do for the rest of her career, leading to her involvement with the design of the Manchester MU5 computer system. Kahn headed several research projects on computer-aided design and information modeling, and died in 2007.

Naadiya Moosajee was born in South Africa in 1984 and earned her bachelor's degree in Civil Engineering and master's degree in Transportation Engineering from the University of Cape Town. She later studied at the University of Edinburgh, earning her master's degree in business administration. Early in her career, she was hired to coordinate transportation for VIP and Media members for the 2010 FIFA World Cup. She was appointed as a global leadership fellow by Youth Action Network and spent the next few years as a Pegasys Strategy and Development consultant. In 2016, she co-founded WomHub, an innovative company supporting high-growth female founders in STEM through their imagineering labs, co-working space, and fund. WomHub contributes to a more inclusive technological future by advancing AI and Cyber Security. That year, she co-funded Turkish Treasures, which owns several high-end Turkish restaurants in Cape Town. Also, in 2016, she began her role at the World Economic Forum as Global Shaper.

Donna Auguste is an African entrepreneur, philanthropist, and computer scientist. She was the founder of Freshwater Software in 1996, a company that provided tools that help them enhance their presence on the Internet (citation). She was the CEO of the company until she sold Freshwater in 2000. She studied at University of California at Berkeley and earned a bachelor's degree in electrical engineering and computer science. She became the first African American woman in the PhD program at Carnegie Mellon University. Auguste has a background in computer science has many technologies related careers, as well as philanthropic. She founded Leave a Little Room foundation, which provides housing, electricity, and vaccinations to low-income families around the world.

=== Western Africa ===
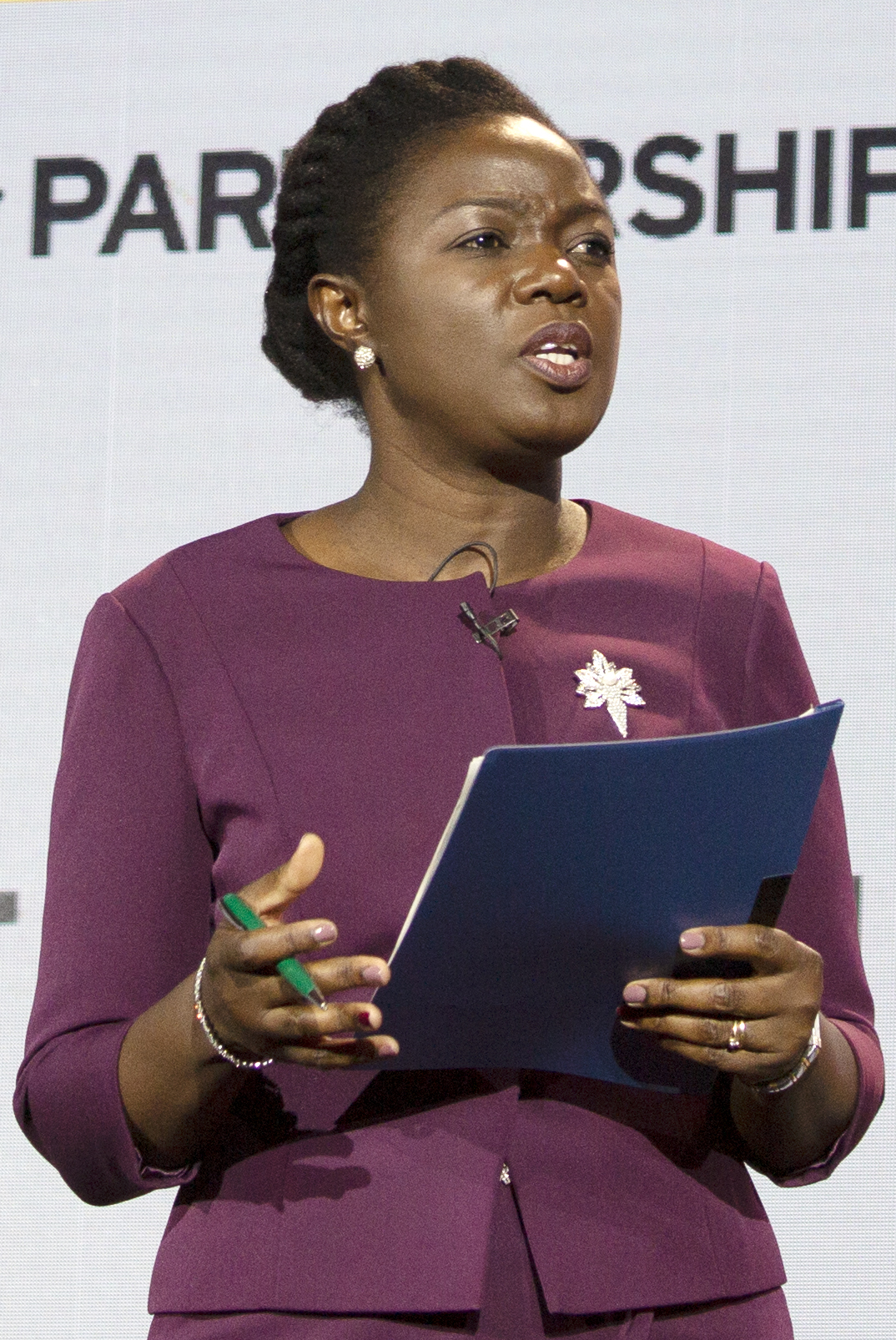
Lucy Quist

Mila Aziablé was born in Togo and is the youngest minister of the new government. She was accepted to the University of Lomé, the national university for engineering. She was awarded a scholarship for her academic excellence, which led to her studying at École Nationale d'Ingénieurs de Metz. There, she earned her degree in mechanical engineering. She later went on to study at Ecole Nationale Supérieure des Mines de Paris and studied gas engineering. In 2018, she began studying at the Paris Institute of Political Studies and earned her master's degree in development and management policies.

Ndèye Tické Ndiaye Diop is a Senegalese engineer and politician. Her engineering background centers around the technology used in fisheries. This enabled her to begin her career as the Secretary-General to the Ministry of Fisheries and continue as the head of the Senegal National Agency for Maritime Affairs. She is currently the Minister of Digital Economy and Telecommunication in Senegal and the spokeswoman for the government. Diop was also awarded the Icone award in 2016 for her contributions as an accomplished woman in Senegal.

Aïssata Issoufou Mahamadou, Niger's first lady, is a Nigerian chemical engineer and backer of healthcare. She is one of the first Nigerian women to chase the scientific engineering field. She gained a degree in mineral exploration and development from the National School of Geology and obtained her master's in chemistry from Abdou Moumouni University.

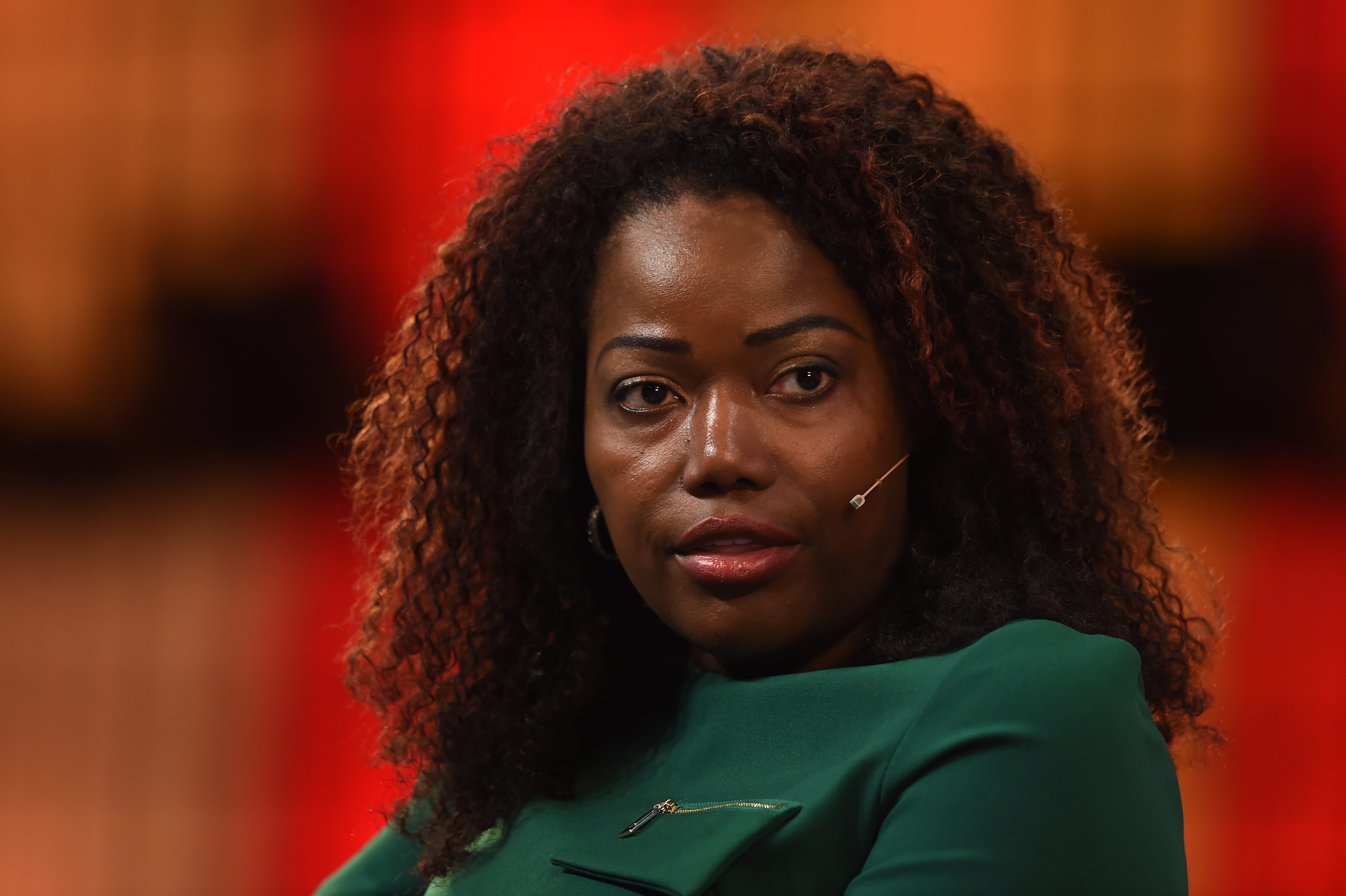
Mary Spio

Ayorkor Korsah is a Ghanaian professor of computer science and robotics at Ashesi University. She earned her bachelor's degrees in engineering and computer science from Dartmouth College and her Ph.D. in robotics and artificial intelligence from Carnegie Mellon University. She is the co-founder of the African Robotics Network (AFRON) which offers a "$10 Robot Design" challenge. With members from 25 countries across Africa, AFRON's mission is to promote collaborations relating to robotics education and research in the continent.

Funke Opeke is a Nigerian-born electrical engineer who obtained bachelor's and master's degrees from Obafemi Awolowo University and Columbia University, respectively. Upon graduation, she worked for Verizon Communications in the Information and Communications technology segment. Opeke's primary engineering contribution to Nigeria is founding OneMain Cable Company which provides communication services and network solutions. OneMain Cable built the first private open-access cable spanning 7,000 km that connects Portugal to South Africa via connections in several western African companies, including Nigeria.

Lucy Quist is a Ghanaian-British electrical engineer and business executive. She graduated from the University of East London with first-class honors in Electrical and Electronic Engineering and pursued an MBA at the Institut Européen d'Administration des Affaires in France. Throughout her career, Quist worked at Ford Motor Company, the Royal Bank of Scotland, Millicom International Cellular, Vodafone, and Airtel Ghana. Additionally, she contributed to founding Quist Blue Diamond, the Executive Women Network, and FreshPay, a payment service in the Democratic Republic of Congo. Quist is currently the managing director at Morgan Stanley and has recently released a book titled "The Bold New Normal: Creating The Africa Where Everyone Prospers (2019) ". Some of her accomplishments include being named part of: BBC's Power Women, the 8th Most Influential Public Figures (Ghana Social Media Rankings), Top 50 Women Corporate Leaders in Ghana (WomanRising), 58th Most Influential Person in Ghana, and Ghana's Most Influential Awards (2016).

Mary Spio is a Ghanaian astronautical engineer and entrepreneur. After being born and raised in Ghana, Spio pursued a bachelor's degree in electrical engineering at Syracuse University in New York, and a master's in electrical engineering at the Georgia Institute of Technology. Throughout her career, she served in the United States Air Force, worked on a NASA project, contributed innovations to companies like Microsoft Xbox, and became the head of satellite systems at Boeing. She also founded her own company CEEK Virtual Reality with the mission to make Virtual Reality more accessible. Spio is also a renowned author with publications such as "It's Not Rocket Science: 7 Game-Changing Traits for Achieving Uncommon Success".

Elsie Akosua Biraa Effah Kaufmann FGA, FBSE, FGhIE, PE is a Ghanaian academic, academic administrator, biomedical engineer, and current host of the National Science and Maths Quiz. She was born on 7 September 1969 in Ghana where she began her secondary education at the Aburi Girls' Senior High School, and obtained her International Baccalaureate Diploma from the United World College of the Atlantic in Wales in 1988. She proceeded to the University of Pennsylvania where she obtained her Bachelor of Science in Engineering (BSE), Master of Science in Engineering (MSE), and a doctorate (PhD) in Bioengineering.

Prof. Kaufmann was a research supervisor at the Department of Chemistry at Rutgers University in New Jersey, United States of America from May 1998 to June 2001 and also served as a Teaching Assistant at the Department of Bioengineering at the University of Pennsylvania, United States of America. Prof Kaufmann then moved to the University of Ghana (2006–2012, 2014–2016) where she served as a Senior Lecturer and the first Head of the Department of Biomedical Engineering. Elsie Effah Kaufmann is a visiting scholar and Founding Head of the Department of Orthotics and Prosthetics at the University of Health and Allied Sciences in Ho, Ghana. Aside from these, she is a University Council Member at Ghana Communication Technology University and also serves on the board of the African Gifted Foundation Ghana (African Science Academy) as well as the British International School-Ghana. Elsie Akosua Biraa Effah Kaufmann is the first woman to be appointed dean of the School of Engineering Sciences, University of Ghana, taking up the post on 1 August 2022. She was part of the members who established the School of Engineering Sciences. Currently, she serves as the President of the Ghana Society of Biomedical Engineers not forgetting how exciting she is as the current host of one of Ghana's cherished academic competitions, the National Science and Math Quiz.

Regions of Africa

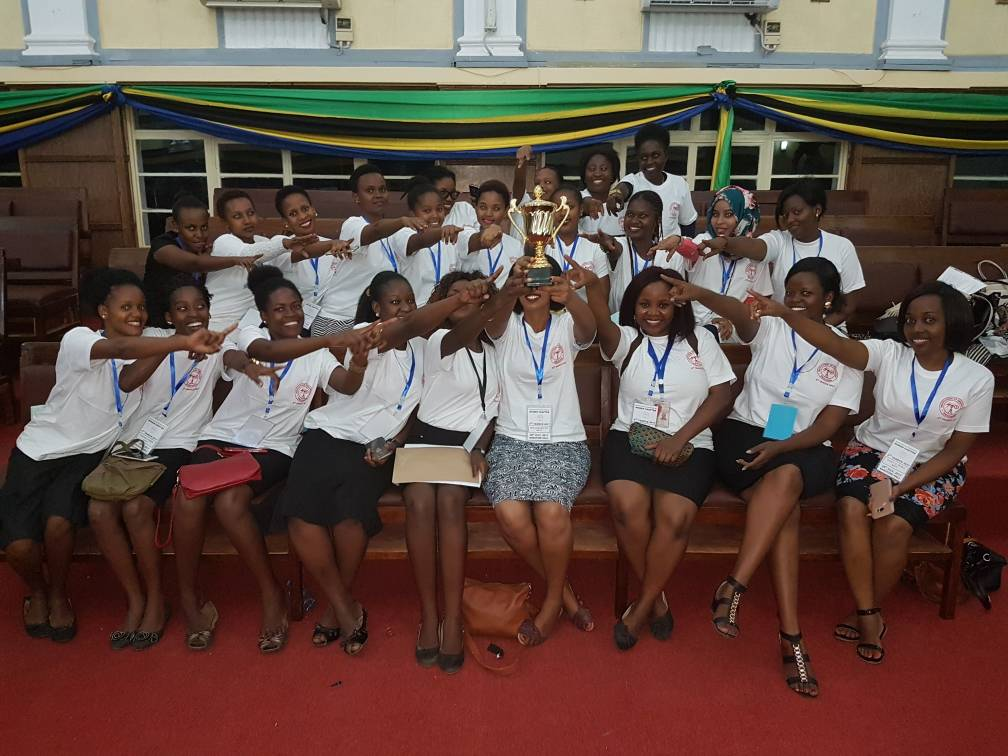
Women engineering graduate students at St.Joseph College of Engineering and Technology in Tanzania.

== Professional organizations ==
Organization	Country
African Women in Science and Engineering (AWSE)	Kenya, Tanzania, Uganda
Association of Professional Women Engineers of Nigeria (APWEN)	Nigeria
Association of South African Women in Science and Engineering	South Africa
Women in Engineering (WomEng)	South Africa
WomHub	South Africa
African Union Development Agency (AURA-NEPAD)	South Africa
