= Ammah (surname) =

Ammah is a surname. Notable people with the surname include:

- Rabiatu Dienyo Ammah, Ghanaian Islamic theologian
- Raquel Naa Ayorkor Ammah (born 1987), Ghanaian musician

== See also ==
- Ammah (Book of Mormon), Nephite missionary
