= Ayorkor =

Ayorkor is a given name. Notable people with the name include:

- Ayorkor Korsah, Ghanaian computer scientist
- Shirley Ayorkor Botchwey (born 1963), Ghanaian politician
- Raquel Naa Ayorkor Ammah (born 1987), Ghanaian musician
