= Korsah =

Korsah is a surname. Notable people with the surname include:

- Ayorkor Korsah, Ghanaian computer scientist
- Dennis Nkrumah-Korsah (born 1996), Ghanaian footballer
- Kobina Arku Korsah (1894–1967), first Chief Justice of Ghana
- Martin Kwaku Adjei-Mensah Korsah, Ghanaian politician
