= 47th People's Choice Awards =

Pop culture award show held in 2021

2021 People's Choice Awards
- Date: December 7, 2021
- Location: Barker Hangar; Santa Monica, California
- Country: United States
- Hosted by: Kenan Thompson

Highlights
- Most wins: BTS, Dwayne Johnson (3)
- Most nominations: Film; F9: The Fast Saga (8); Television; This Is Us (6); Music; Justin Bieber (10)
- Website: votepca.com

Television/radio coverage
- Network: NBC; E!
- Produced by: Barb Bialkowski; Jesse Ignjatovic; Evan Prager

The 47th ceremony of the People's Choice Awards was held on December 7, 2021, at the Barker Hangar in Santa Monica, California. Hosted by Kenan Thompson, the show was the first to be presented before an in-person audience since 2019. The television broadcast marked the first time the show was aired live simultaneously on both NBC and E! after airing solely on E! for the past three years, and on CBS prior to that.

In October, over 300 nominees spanning 40 entertainment categories across film, television, music, and pop culture were announced. F9: The Fast Saga and This Is Us were the most-nominated entries in the Film and Television categories respectively with eight and six nominations each. Justin Bieber led the Music nominations with 10 to his name. The most-awarded nominees of the night were BTS and Dwayne Johnson, who won three awards each: the former won Group, Song, and Music Video of 2021, while the latter won Male and Comedy Movie Star, and was additionally honored with the People's Champion Award, one of three Icon awards given on the night. Black Widow won Movie of 2021, while Loki won TV Show of 2021. Christina Aguilera was honored with the show's first-ever Music Icon Award, in recognition of her career and contributions to the music industry.

== Performers ==
Christina Aguilera was the first performer announced for the show on December 1, 2021. H.E.R. and Blake Shelton were announced as additional performers on December 6, with H.E.R. slated to perform a tribute to R&B singer Marvin Gaye in honor of his life and musical legacy. As the recipient of the inaugural Music Icon Award, Aguilera performed a medley of her most popular songs, including the single "Somos Nada" from her then-upcoming studio album Aguilera (2022). Backed by a group of violinists, the singer opened with a gothic-style rock rendition of "Genie in a Bottle" while wearing a "floor-length black ruffled gown". She then segued into selections from her Back to Basics (2006) and Stripped (2002) albums. Aguilera's performance featured three wardrobe changes, including a black and yellow leather outfit—reminiscent of the one she wore for MTV's TRL Presents: Christina Aguilera Stripped in NYC in 2002, and the original red version from the "Dirrty" music video—for her second segment, and a yellow dress for the finale.

List of musical performances
Artist(s)	Song(s)
Christina Aguilera	Medley "Genie in a Bottle" "Dirrty" "Ain't No Other Man" "Fighter" "Can't Hold Us Down" "Somos Nada" "Beautiful"
H.E.R.	Marvin Gaye Tribute "What's Going On" "Inner City Blues (Make Me Wanna Holler)"
Blake Shelton	"Come Back as a Country Boy"

== Presenters ==
Kenan Thompson was announced as the show's host in November. The full lineup of celebrity presenters was announced on December 6. Laverne Cox hosted the red carpet pre-show.

- Becky G – presented the Music Icon Award to Christina Aguilera
- Cardi B – presented the People's Icon Award to Halle Berry
- Jeff Bezos – presented the People's Champion Award to Dwayne Johnson
- Eliza Coupe, Ginnifer Goodwin, and Maggie Q – presented the award for Male TV Star of 2021
- Laverne Cox – introduced H.E.R.
- Mike Epps
- Paris Jackson – presented the award for Reality Show of 2021
- Leslie Jones – presented the award for Male Movie Star of 2021
- Lil Rel Howery
- Jack Quaid and Sydney Sweeney – presented the award for Country Artist of 2021
- Lili Reinhart
- Tracee Ellis Ross – presented the Fashion Icon Award to Kim Kardashian
- Jojo Siwa – presented the award for Daytime Talk Show of 2021
- Chase Stokes
- Wanda Sykes

== Winners and nominees ==
Nominations were announced on October 27, 2021. Voting opened that same day and took place on the PCAs website and Twitter until November 17. In the film categories, F9: The Fast Saga received eight nominations, while Black Widow and Coming 2 America garnered six each. For television, This Is Us led with six nominations across five categories while Grey's Anatomy, Law & Order: SVU, Loki, Outer Banks, Ted Lasso, and WandaVision tied with four apiece. Justin Bieber led the music categories with ten nominations, followed by Lil Nas X with six. Christina Aguilera received the inaugural Music Icon Award.

Winners are listed first and highlighted in bold. BTS and Dwayne Johnson won three awards each and were the most-awarded nominees of the night.

=== Film ===
The Movie of 2021	The Comedy Movie of 2021
**Black Widow**; Coming 2 America; Dune; F9: The Fast Saga; No Time to Die; Shang-Chi and the Legend of the Ten Rings; The Tomorrow War; Venom: Let There Be Carnage	**Free Guy**; Coming 2 America; He's All That; Hitman's Wife's Bodyguard; Jungle Cruise; Space Jam: A New Legacy; Thunder Force; Vacation Friends
The Action Movie of 2021	The Drama Movie of 2021
**Shang-Chi and the Legend of the Ten Rings**; Black Widow; F9: The Fast Saga; Godzilla vs. Kong; No Time to Die; The Suicide Squad; The Tomorrow War; Venom: Let There Be Carnage	**Cruella**; Dune; Fatherhood; Halloween Kills; In the Heights; Old; A Quiet Place Part II; Respect
The Family Movie of 2021	The Male Movie Star of 2021
**Luca**; The Boss Baby: Family Business; Cinderella; The Mitchells vs. the Machines; Raya and the Last Dragon; Tom & Jerry; Vivo; Yes Day	**Dwayne Johnson – Jungle Cruise**; John Cena – F9: The Fast Saga; Daniel Craig – No Time to Die; Vin Diesel – F9: The Fast Saga; Simu Liu – Shang-Chi and the Legend of the Ten Rings; Eddie Murphy – Coming 2 America; Chris Pratt – The Tomorrow War; Ryan Reynolds – Free Guy
The Female Movie Star of 2021	The Drama Movie Star of 2021
**Scarlett Johansson – Black Widow**; Awkwafina – Shang-Chi and the Legend of the Ten Rings; Salma Hayek – Hitman's Wife's Bodyguard; Jennifer Hudson – Respect; Leslie Jones – Coming 2 America; Florence Pugh – Black Widow; Margot Robbie – The Suicide Squad; Charlize Theron – F9: The Fast Saga	**Kevin Hart – Fatherhood**; Emily Blunt – A Quiet Place Part II; Timothée Chalamet – Dune; Jamie Lee Curtis – Halloween Kills; Jennifer Hudson – Respect; Jason Momoa – Dune; Anthony Ramos – In the Heights; Emma Stone – Cruella
The Comedy Movie Star of 2021	The Action Movie Star of 2021
**Dwayne Johnson – Jungle Cruise**; Emily Blunt – Jungle Cruise; Salma Hayek – Hitman's Wife's Bodyguard; Leslie Jones – Coming 2 America; Melissa McCarthy – Thunder Force; Eddie Murphy – Coming 2 America; Ryan Reynolds – Free Guy; Octavia Spencer – Thunder Force	**Simu Liu – Shang-Chi and the Legend of the Ten Rings**; John Cena – F9: The Fast Saga; Daniel Craig – No Time to Die; Vin Diesel – F9: The Fast Saga; Scarlett Johansson – Black Widow; Chris Pratt – The Tomorrow War; Florence Pugh – Black Widow; Charlize Theron – F9: The Fast Saga

=== TV ===
The Show of 2021	The Drama Show of 2021
**Loki**; Cobra Kai; Grey's Anatomy; Law & Order: Special Victims Unit; The Bachelor; Saturday Night Live; This Is Us; WandaVision	**Grey's Anatomy**; 9-1-1; Cobra Kai; The Equalizer; Law & Order: Special Victims Unit; Outer Banks; This Is Us; The Walking Dead
The Comedy Show of 2021	The Reality Show of 2021
**Never Have I Ever**; Brooklyn Nine-Nine; Grown-ish; Only Murders in the Building; Saturday Night Live; Ted Lasso; The Upshaws; Young Rock	**Keeping Up with the Kardashians**; 90 Day Fiancé; Bachelor in Paradise; Below Deck; Jersey Shore: Family Vacation; Love & Hip Hop: Atlanta; The Real Housewives of Atlanta; The Real Housewives of Beverly Hills
The Competition Show of 2021	The Male TV Star of 2021
**The Voice**; America's Got Talent; American Idol; The Bachelor; The Bachelorette; Dancing with the Stars; The Masked Singer; RuPaul's Drag Race	**Tom Hiddleston – Loki**; Sterling K. Brown – This Is Us; Dwayne Johnson – Young Rock; Anthony Mackie – The Falcon and the Winter Soldier; Norman Reedus – The Walking Dead; Chase Stokes – Outer Banks; Jason Sudeikis – Ted Lasso; Kenan Thompson – Saturday Night Live
The Female TV Star of 2021	The Drama TV Star of 2021
**Ellen Pompeo – Grey's Anatomy**; Angela Bassett – 9-1-1; Kathryn Hahn – WandaVision; Mariska Hargitay – Law & Order: Special Victims Unit; Mandy Moore – This Is Us; Elizabeth Olsen – WandaVision; Queen Latifah – The Equalizer; Yara Shahidi – Grown-ish	**Chase Stokes – Outer Banks**; Angela Bassett – 9-1-1; Sterling K. Brown – This Is Us; Mariska Hargitay – Law & Order: Special Victims Unit; Mandy Moore – This Is Us; Ellen Pompeo – Grey's Anatomy; Queen Latifah – The Equalizer; Norman Reedus – The Walking Dead
The Comedy TV Star of 2021	The Daytime Talk Show of 2021
**Selena Gomez – Only Murders in the Building**; Dwayne Johnson – Young Rock; Steve Martin – Only Murders in the Building; Andy Samberg – Brooklyn Nine-Nine; Yara Shahidi – Grown-ish; Jason Sudeikis – Ted Lasso; Wanda Sykes – The Upshaws; Kenan Thompson – Saturday Night Live	**The Ellen DeGeneres Show**; Good Morning America; The Kelly Clarkson Show; Live with Kelly and Ryan; Red Table Talk; Today; The View; The Wendy Williams Show
The Nighttime Talk Show of 2021	The Competition Contestant of 2021
**The Tonight Show Starring Jimmy Fallon**; The Daily Show with Trevor Noah; Full Frontal with Samantha Bee; Jimmy Kimmel Live!; Last Week Tonight with John Oliver; Late Night with Seth Meyers; The Late Late Show with James Corden; The Late Show with Stephen Colbert	**JoJo Siwa – Dancing with the Stars**; Gottmik – RuPaul's Drag Race; Matt James – The Bachelor; JoJo – The Masked Singer; Cody Rigsby – Dancing with the Stars; Symone – RuPaul's Drag Race; Katie Thurston – The Bachelorette; Wiz Khalifa – The Masked Singer
The Reality TV Star of 2021	The Bingeworthy Show of 2021
**Khloé Kardashian – Keeping Up with the Kardashians**; Joe Amabile – Bachelor in Paradise; Kandi Burruss – The Real Housewives of Atlanta; Kim Kardashian West – Keeping Up with the Kardashians; Erica Mena – Love & Hip Hop: Atlanta; Nicole "Snooki" Polizzi – Jersey Shore: Family Vacation; Lisa Rinna – The Real Housewives of Beverly Hills; Mike "The Situation" Sorrentino – Jersey Shore: Family Vacation	**Squid Game**; Cobra Kai; Loki; Mare of Easttown; Outer Banks; Sex/Life; Ted Lasso; The White Lotus
The Sci-Fi/Fantasy Show of 2021
**Lucifer**; The Falcon and the Winter Soldier; The Flash; La Brea; Loki; Shadow and Bone; Superman & Lois; WandaVision

=== Music ===
The Male Artist of 2021	The Female Artist of 2021
**Lil Nas X**; Bad Bunny; Justin Bieber; Luke Combs; Drake; Shawn Mendes; Ed Sheeran; The Weeknd	**Adele**; Cardi B; Doja Cat; Billie Eilish; Halsey; Megan Thee Stallion; Olivia Rodrigo; Saweetie
The Group of 2021	The Song of 2021
**BTS**; Coldplay; Dan + Shay; Imagine Dragons; Jonas Brothers; Maroon 5; Migos; Twenty One Pilots	**"Butter" – BTS**; "Bad Habits" – Ed Sheeran; "Easy on Me" – Adele; "Good 4 U" – Olivia Rodrigo; "Montero (Call Me By Your Name)" – Lil Nas X; "Peaches" – Justin Bieber featuring Daniel Caesar and Giveon; "Stay" – The Kid Laroi and Justin Bieber; "Up" – Cardi B
The Album of 2021	The Country Artist of 2021
**Sour – Olivia Rodrigo**; Certified Lover Boy – Drake; Culture III – Migos; Happier Than Ever – Billie Eilish; Justice – Justin Bieber; Montero – Lil Nas X; Planet Her – Doja Cat; Star-Crossed – Kacey Musgraves	**Blake Shelton**; Kane Brown; Luke Bryan; Luke Combs; Dan + Shay; Miranda Lambert; Kacey Musgraves; Carrie Underwood
The Latin Artist of 2021	The New Artist of 2021
**Bad Bunny**; Anuel AA; Becky G; Daddy Yankee; J Balvin; Karol G; Maluma; Natti Natasha	**Olivia Rodrigo**; 24kGoldn; Rauw Alejandro; Giveon; The Kid Laroi; Tate McRae; Bella Poarch; Tomorrow X Together
The Music Video of 2021	The Collaboration Song of 2021
**"Butter" – BTS**; "Easy on Me" – Adele; "Good 4 U" – Olivia Rodrigo; "Location" – Karol G, Anuel AA, J Balvin; "Montero (Call Me By Your Name)" – Lil Nas X; "My Universe" – Coldplay and BTS; "Peaches" – Justin Bieber featuring Daniel Caesar and Giveon; "Stay" – The Kid Laroi and Justin Bieber	**"Stay" – The Kid Laroi and Justin Bieber**; "Best Friend" – Saweetie featuring Doja Cat; "Industry Baby" – Lil Nas X and Jack Harlow; "Kiss Me More" – Doja Cat featuring SZA; "Leave the Door Open" – Silk Sonic (Bruno Mars and Anderson .Paak); "Peaches" – Justin Bieber featuring Daniel Caesar and Giveon; "Way 2 Sexy" – Drake featuring Future and Young Thug; "You Right" – Doja Cat, The Weeknd

=== Pop culture ===
The Social Star of 2021	The Pop Special of 2021
**Britney Spears**; Justin Bieber; Charli D'Amelio; Kylie Jenner; Dwayne Johnson; Kim Kardashian West; Lil Nas X; Addison Rae	**Friends: The Reunion**; Billie Eilish: The World's a Little Blurry; Demi Lovato: Dancing with the Devil; Justin Bieber: Our World; Olympic Highlights With Kevin Hart and Snoop Dogg; Oprah with Meghan and Harry; Pink: All I Know So Far; Savage X Fenty Show Vol. 3
The Comedy Act of 2021	The Game Changer of 2021
**Vaccinated and Horny Tour – Chelsea Handler**; Back to Abnormal Tour – Trevor Noah; Bo Burnham: Inside – Bo Burnham; From Scratch Tour – John Mulaney; Sorry, Harriet Tubman – Phoebe Robinson; The King's Jester Tour – Hasan Minhaj; The Milk & Money Tour – Ali Wong; You Know What It Is – Marlon Wayans	**Simone Biles**; Sunisa Lee; Patrick Mahomes; Alex Morgan; Carl Nassib; Naomi Osaka; Bubba Wallace; Serena Williams
The Pop Podcast of 2021
**Anything Goes with Emma Chamberlain**; Armchair Expert; Call Her Daddy; Chicks in the Office; Conan O'Brien Needs a Friend; Couple Things with Shawn and Andrew; SmartLess; Why Won't You Date Me? with Nicole Byer

=== Other ===
Social Star France 2021	African Social Star 2021
**Noholito**; The Doll Beauty; Jessica Errero; Mayadorable; Johan Papz; Honey Shay; Style Tonic; Rose Thr	**Tyra Chikocho AKA Madamboss**; Lasizwe Dambuza; Falz; Azziad Nasenya; Mihlali Ndamase; The Odditty; Witney Ramabulana; Boitumelo "Boity" Thulo
People's Icon Award of 2021
**Halle Berry**
Music Icon Award of 2021
**Christina Aguilera**
Fashion Icon Award of 2021
**Kim Kardashian**
People's Champion Award of 2021
**Dwayne Johnson**
