= Zhao Jiaotong =

- Born: 16 December 1984 (age 41)
- Known for: Alleged mastermind of E-Creator Ponzi scheme
- Status: Awaiting trial
- Criminal charges: Fraud, money laundering

Zhao Jiaotong is a Chinese national who is the alleged founder and mastermind of the E-Creator Ponzi scheme in Zimbabwe. He faces charges of fraud and money laundering amounting to US$1 million, following the collapse of the investment platform in July 2023.

== E-Creator Ponzi Scheme ==
In January 2023, Zhao Jiaotong is alleged to have devised a plan to defraud Zimbabwean nationals through an online investment scheme. On 7 February 2023, a company named E-Creator Electronic Commerce (Private) Limited was registered with the Zimbabwean Registrar of Companies. The company operated from offices in Joina City, Harare.

From February to July 2023, the company promoted an online e-commerce investment platform that promised investors substantial monthly profits based on their level of investment. The scheme attracted thousands of investors who deposited an estimated US$1 million through various EcoCash numbers. To enhance its credibility, the scheme used national television, social media, and prominent Zimbabwean socialites such as Tarisai Cleopatra Munetsiwa (Madam Boss) and Admire Mushambi (Mama Vee) for promotion.

== Arrest ==
In early July 2023, investors began experiencing difficulties withdrawing their funds. Company representatives initially claimed this was due to a system upgrade. However, on 5 July 2023, a notice appeared on the E-Creator website stating the company had ceased operations and alleging that Zhao Jiaotong had fled to China with investor funds.

Zhao Jiaotong was arrested on 12 July 2023 at the Robert Gabriel Mugabe International Airport while attempting to board a flight to Dubai. The investigating officer, Detective Brighton Samaneka, opposed bail, stating Zhao was a flight risk and possessed large sums of fraudulently obtained money.

== Legal Proceedings ==
Zhao Jiaotong first appeared in the Harare Magistrates Court on 14 July 2023. On 22 July 2023, Magistrate Marehwanazvo Gofa denied him bail, citing the severity of the charges and flight risk.

In February 2025, the State withdrew charges against several co-accused, leaving Zhao Jiaotong as one of the two defendants. The trial against Zhao Jiaotong and William Chui commenced in July 2025, with both defendants pleading not guilty. Zhao Jiaotong remains in remand prison as the trial proceeds.
