= Disu =

Disu is a surname. Notable people with the surname include:

- Abdul Karim Disu (1912–2000), Nigerian journalist
- Adiat Disu (born 1987), American businesswoman
- Dylan Disu (born 2000), American basketball player
