= InnBucks MicroBank Limited =

Financial services companies in Zimbabwe

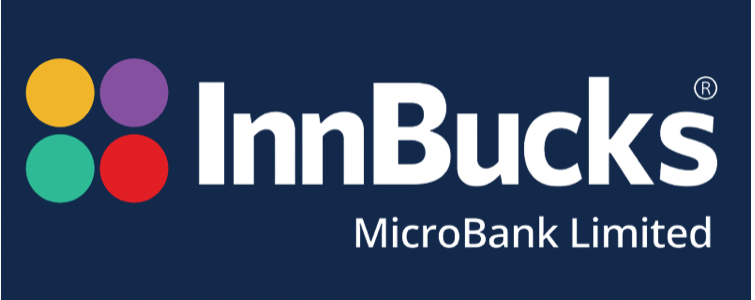
InnBucks MicroBank Limited official logo

InnBucks MicroBank Limited is a deposit taking micro-finance registered and regulated in terms of Zimbabwean law. It offers banking and financial services to individuals and public. It was formed as registered corporate after acquiring and renaming of Ndoro Micro-finance in 2022.

InnBucks MicroBank Limited is owned by a publicly traded company called Simbisa Brands and is part of Innscor Africa network of companies.

== InnBucks ==
InnBucks is money transfer service regulated by Zimbabwean laws and owned by InnBucks MicroBank. Its primary purpose is providing remittances transfer services to the general public. It was first popularised among patrons of restaurant chains franchised under Simbisa like Nando's as way of enabling small change transactions rendered impossible by Zimbabwe's overall demonetization.

=== Background ===
InnBucks was formulated as loyalty program by Simbisa Brands, it later on expanded into remittances platform before it was banned by Reserve Bank of Zimbabwe. It came back some time later as a licensed product after Simbisa Brands acquired Ndoro micro-finance and renamed it, to InnBucks MicroBank Limited.

=== Competitors ===
- EcoCash
- Omari
- Mukuru
- World Remit
- Western Union
- Mama Money
- Mojo Mula
- Senditoo

== Products and services ==
- Personal banking
- Business banking
- International banking
- International remittances
- Personal and business Loans
- Treasury and structured finance
