= Naadiya Moosajee =

South African engineer, social entrepreneur

- Born: 1984 (age 41–42); Cape Town, South Africa
- Citizenship: South Africa
- Occupations: Engineer, Social Entrepreneur and Business Executive
- Title: Founder and Chief Executive Officer of Women in Engineering.

Naadiya Moosajee, is a South African engineer, social entrepreneur and co-founder of Women in Engineering (WomEng), a non-profit organization that aims to develop engineering talent among girls in multiple African countries.

== Background and education ==
She was born in South Africa in 1984. She attended the University of Cape Town (UCT), graduating in with a Bachelor of Science (BSc) degree in Civil Engineering. She continued her studies at UCT, graduating with a Master of Science (MSc) degree in Transport Engineering in 2009. During her final year while pursuing the master's degree, she spent 12 months as an international exchange student at the University of Stuttgart in Germany. In 2013, she graduated from the University of Edinburgh with a Master of Business Administration (MBA) degree.

== Career ==
For one year, immediately after her first degree, she was hired as a Project Engineer, by Arcus Gibb Engineering (today GIBB Engineering), a consulting engineering firm based in Cape Town. During the 2010 FIFA World Cup, she was hired as the VIP & Media Transport Coordinator for planning, scheduling and operations for all ground transportation for VIPs, the media and match officials during the 2010 FIFA World Cup operations in Cape Town.

In 2009, she was appointed a Global Leadership Fellow by Youth Action Network, a United Kingdom-based non-profit organisation. She served there for fourteen months until November 2010. For a period of over two years, from May 2011 until July 2013, she worked as the Engagement Manager at Pegasys Strategy & Development, an advisory group focusing on the impact of development in emerging economies. She served there as a consultant on large scale climate change and public transportation projects.

== Other considerations ==
In December 2014, Naadiya Moosajee was named among "The 20 Youngest Power Women In Africa 2014", by Forbes Magazine

Over the years, she has founded and co-founded a number of non-profit and for-profit companies and organisations, including (a) Naadiya M, a garment designing, manufacturing and marketing business targeting women's business attire and evening wear, which she founded in 2013 (b) In 2014, she co-founded JourneyMap Consulting, a talent search and talent acquisition enterprise with offices in Johannesburg and Cape Town. (c) She co-founded Women in Engineering (WomEng) in 2005 and has served as the CEO since. WomEng has ongoing operations in South Africa and Kenya.

She is a member of a number of boards, including (a) A member of the Regional Advisory Board of Frost & Sullivan, for the African region. (b) A member of the board of the International Youth Foundation, since January 2012. (c) A member of the board of directors at Pegasys, since August 2013. and (d) A member of the Global Future Council at the World Economic Forum, since August 2016.

== See also ==
- Adiat Disu
- Ada Osakwe
- Susan Oguya
