= Madam Boss =

Zimbabwean comedian and actress (born 1985)

- Born: Tarisai Cleopatra Chikocho; April 16, 1985 (age 41); Harare, Zimbabwe
- Other names: Tyra Chikocho, Tyra Munetsiwa
- Citizenship: Zimbabwean
- Occupations: Socialite; Actress
- Known for: Comedy, Acting
- Television: SABC 1 (Ubettina Wethu)
- Spouse: Ngonidzaishe Munetsiwa

Tarisai Cleopatra Munetsiwa popularly known as Madam Boss is a Zimbabwean comedian, socialite, music artist and actress.

== Early background ==
Madam Boss was born in Harare in 1985. She grew up in Madziva village in Zimbabwe, where she started off as a maid. She is married to Ngoni, who also writes some of her social media skits scripts.

== Career ==
Madam Boss started her career as a gospel music artist when she released her debut album titled Sunungura. She became prominent as a comedian socialite when she started doing comedy skits as a maid which circulated on social media. She become the first Zimbabwean comedian to reach 1 million followers on Facebook. In 2021 she began an acting career when she was cast in a Nollywood series titled The Offspring. She was then cast for a role in South Africa’s SABC 1 drama series Ubettina Wethu. In July 2021, it was announced that Madam Boss was to act in a South African-produced Netflix film called The Bad Bishop.

In May 2022, it was announced that a movie titled Becoming Madam Boss inspired by her true life story had begun shooting

She is the brand ambassador of RwandAir as well as other corporates which include Net*One, Nyaradzo Group and Ingwebu Breweries.

== E-Creator controversy ==
In October 2025, Madam Boss testified in the Harare Magistrates’ Court about her involvement with the investment platform E-Creator, which the State alleged was a Ponzi scheme that defrauded hundreds of people of more than US$300,000. She told the court that fellow content creator Admire Mushambi, also known as "Mama Vee", had introduced her to the scheme in June 2023 and that she was paid US$700 to promote it through Facebook adverts. She later invested US$100 of her own funds and persuaded relatives to join, but said she did not recover her money. Her association with the scheme drew public criticism and prompted debate about her role as a brand ambassador. The trial of the accused, Zhao Jiaotong and William Chui, continued in October 2025, while a warrant of arrest was issued for Mushambi after he failed to appear in court.

== Awards ==
- Social Media Brand of the year - Zimbabwe Business Awards 2017
- Socialite of the year - Zimbabwe Social Media Awards 2018
- People's Choice - Zimbabwe International Women Awards 2018
- Women Of The Year Award In Digital And Social Media - Zimbabwe National Women’s Awards 2018
- Influencer of the Year - Zimbabwe Achievers Awards 2021 (nominated)
- E! Entertainment People's Choice Awards - African Social Star winner 2021

== Personal life ==
She is married to Ngonidzaishe Munetsiwa since 2011.
