= Funke Opeke =

Nigerian electrical engineer

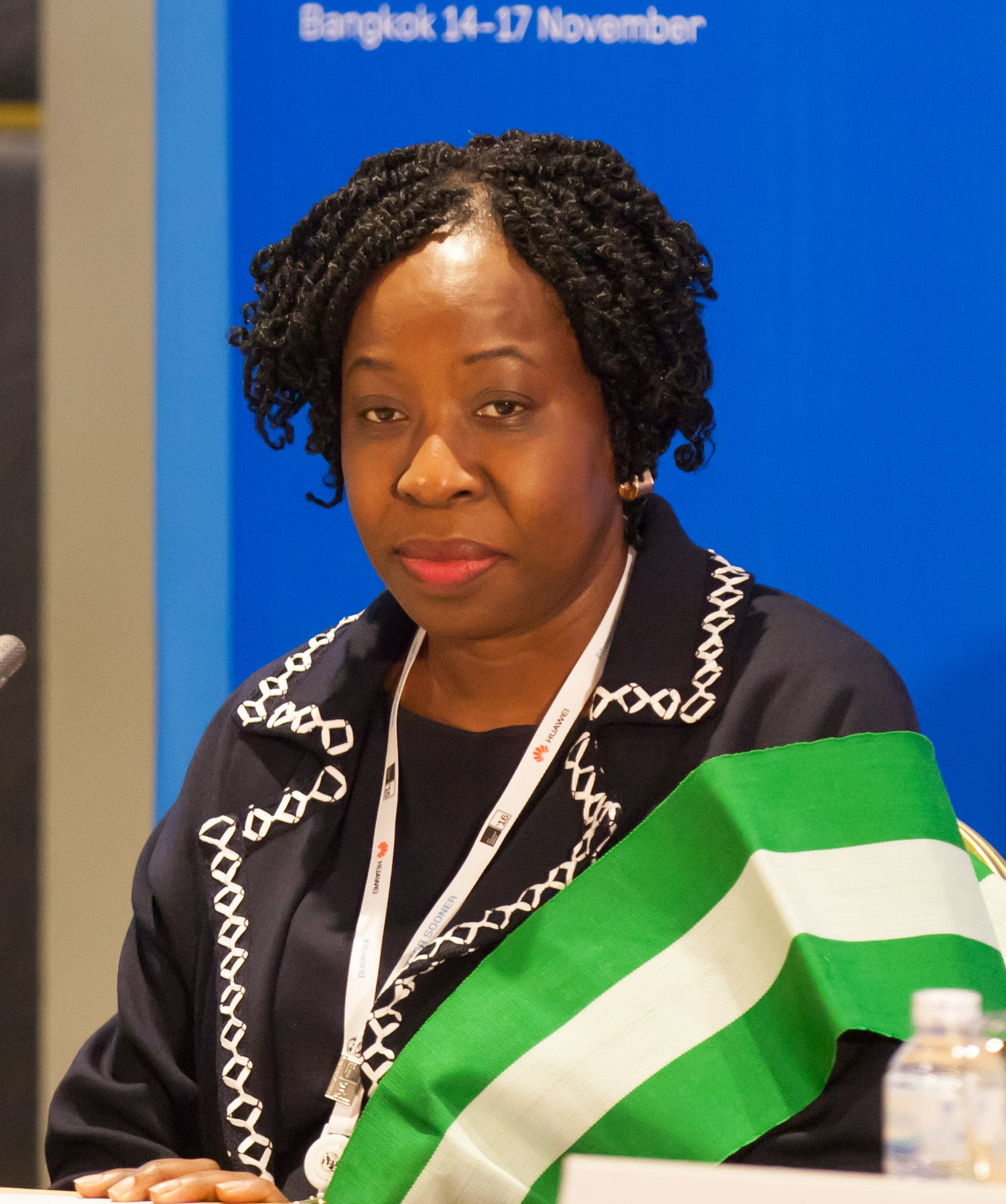
- Born: 1961 (age 64–65); Ibadan, Oyo State, Nigeria
- Education: University of Ìfẹ́, now Obafemi Awolowo University; Columbia University
- Known for: Electrical engineering
- Notable work: Founder of Main Street Technologies
- Awards: CNBC All Africa Businesswoman of the Year (2012); Africa's Most Powerful Women In Technology (2013)

Funke Opeke (born 1961 in Ibadan) is a Nigerian electrical engineer and telecommunications executive who founded Main Street Technologies and MainOne. She led MainOne as chief executive officer and, following its acquisition by Equinix, as managing director for West Africa until stepping down in November 2024. She then became a strategic adviser to the company.

== Early life and education ==
Opeke attended Queen's School in Ibadan, Oyo State, Nigeria.

Opeke grew up in Ibadan and is from Ile-Oluji, Ondo State. She was one of nine children. Her father was the first Nigerian director of the Cocoa Research Institute of Nigeria, and her mother was a teacher.

Opeke earned a bachelor's degree in electrical engineering from the University of Ife (now Obafemi Awolowo University) and a master's degree in the same field from Columbia University. After she graduated from Columbia University, she followed with a career in ICT in the United States as an executive director with the wholesale division of Verizon in New York City. In 2005, she joined MTN Nigeria as chief technical officer (CTO). She served as adviser at Transcorp and chief operating officer of NITEL for a brief period.

== MainOne Cable ==
After returning to Nigeria, Opeke founded MainOne in 2008 to address limited internet connectivity in the country. The company developed a 7,000-kilometre submarine cable network running from Portugal to West Africa, with landing stations in Nigeria, Ghana and Côte d'Ivoire. In 2015, MainOne began operating a Tier III data centre and extended its submarine cable from Lagos to Cameroon.

In December 2021, Equinix announced an agreement to acquire MainOne at an enterprise value of US$320 million. The acquisition was completed on 5 April 2022, with Opeke continuing to lead the business under the name “MainOne, an Equinix company”.

== Awards ==
- 2012, CNBC All Africa Businesswoman of the Year
- 2013, Africa's Most Powerful Women In Technology
- 2018, Forbes list The World's Top 50 Women In Tech
- 2022, Officer of the Order of the Niger (OON)
