= Ndèye Tické Ndiaye Diop =

Senegalese politician and engineer

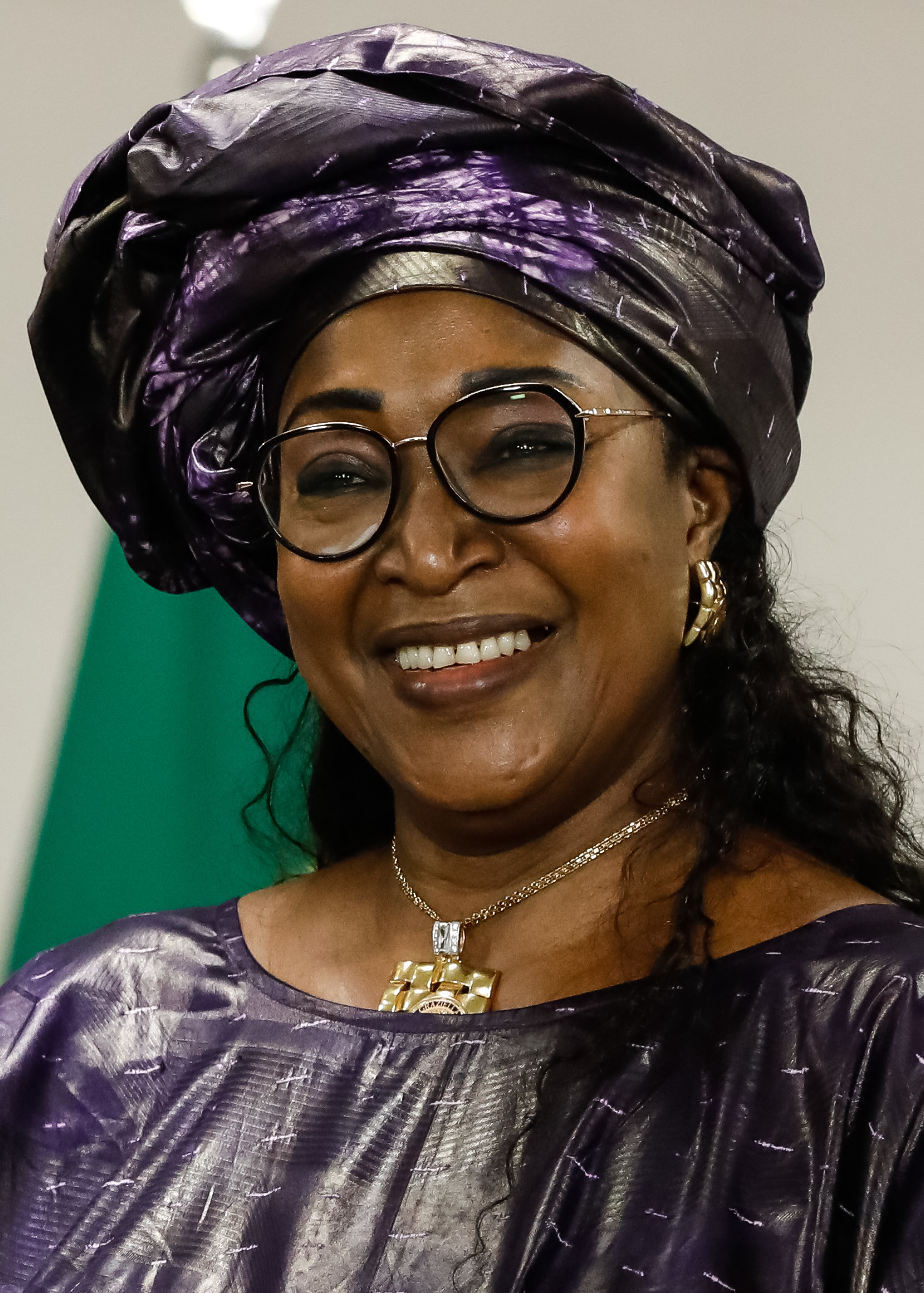
- Ndèye Tické Ndiaye Diop in 2021

Minister of Digital Economy and Telecommunication
- Incumbent
- Assumed office April 7, 2019
- President: Macky Sall
- Prime Minister: Mohammed Dionne

Personal details
- Occupation: Fisheries technology engineer

Ndèye Tické Ndiaye Diop is a Senegalese politician from Thiès. She became the Minister of Digital Economy and Telecommunication in April 2019.

== Career ==
She is an engineer in fisheries technology. She carried out activities to support the population of Thiès, such as granting credits to women and investing in hygiene facilities. She was awarded the Icone 2016 award for her activities.

She first served as Secretary General to the Ministry of Fisheries. In 2017, she was appointed head of the Senegal National Agency for Maritime Affairs (ANAM).

In April 2019, she was appointed as the Minister of Digital Economy and Telecommunication (succeeding Abdoulaye Baldé) as well as Spokeswoman of the Government.

On March 21, 2021, she was appointed Senegal's ambassador to Brazil by the Council of Ministers. She presented her credentials to Brazilian President Jair Bolsonaro on October 8, 2021
