= Natalie Payida Jabangwe =

Zimbabwean computer scientist and corporate executive

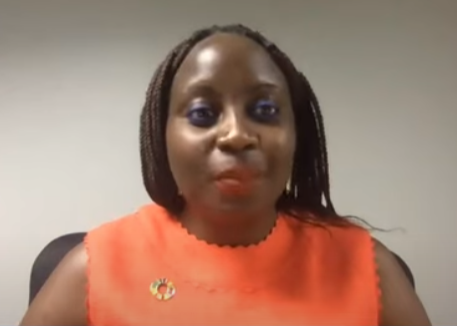
- Speaking at the World Economic Forum's Sustainable Development Impact Summit 2021
- Born: c. 1983; United Kingdom
- Citizenship: Zimbabwean
- Education: Middlesex University (BS); Imperial College London (MBA)
- Occupations: Computer Engineer, Businesswoman & Corporate Executive
- Years active: 2005 — present
- Title: Group Digital Executive Officer of Sanlam

Wikipedia:Categories for discussion/Log/2025 December 9

Natalie Payida Jabangwe (née Natalie Payida) is a Zimbabwean computer engineer and businesswoman, who serves as the Group Digital Executive Officer at Sanlam, based in Cape Town, South Africa. In this role, she oversees digital functions in over 34 African markets, India and Malaysia.

She was the chief executive officer of EcoCash, the mobile money service of Econet Wireless, a leading wireless telephony company in Zimbabwe. She ran the second-largest mobile financial service company on the African continent, serving in excess of six million individuals, as of 2018.

== Early life and education ==
Payida Jabangwe was born in the United Kingdom circa 1983. She studied at Middlesex University, graduating with a Bachelor of Science degree in Computer Engineering. While at Middlesex, she studied as an exchange student at Spelman College in Atlanta, Georgia. Later, she earned an Executive Master of Business Administration, from the Imperial College London.

== Career ==
While pursuing her master's degree, she worked with National Cash Register and was part of the team that developed the digital payments strategy of the company. In January 2014, she relocated to Zimbabwe to lead EcoCash, having been headhunted for that purpose. In December 2016, she was reported to be the youngest chief executive of a mobile money company on the African continent, at that time.

In May 2018, Payida Jabangwe was nominated among the 100 Young Global Leaders of the World Economic Forum 2018, a platform used to groom "the world's brightest under 40 and most promising" future leaders. She was also a 2017 Fellow of The Archbishop Desmond Tutu Leadership Fellowship Program. In November 2018, United Nations Secretary General António Guterres appointed her to the United Nations' Task Force on Digital Financing of Sustainable Development Goals, co-chaired by Maria Ramos and Achim Steiner.

In 2018, Payida Jabangwe was named among the "100 Africa Economic Leaders for Tomorrow" by the Institut Choiseul for International Politics and Geoeconomics, a Paris-based think tank.

While at Spelman College in Atlanta, she interned in the office then-Atlanta Mayor, Shirley Franklin. Payida Jabangwe is credited with developing Atlanta's first information technology security policies in 2004, when she was 21 years old.

== Family ==
Natalie Payida Jabangwe is mother of one daughter, Makatendeka Morris.

== See also ==
- Econet Wireless
