= Tyseer Aboulnasr =

Egyptian electrical engineer

Tyseer Aboulnasr is an Egyptian electrical engineer. She was formerly the Dean of the Faculty of Engineering at the University of Ottawa from 1998 to 2004 and the Dean of the Faculty of Applied Sciences at the University of British Columbia from 2008 to 2011. She is currently volunteering with NGOs and governments to promote research and innovation in Egypt.

== Early life and education ==
Aboulnasr grew up in Egypt and attended a British Catholic seminary school as a young girl. Her mother was a teacher and school principal, and Aboulnasr describes her family as "liberal" in that she was permitted to pursue an education and career in engineering, rather than medicine, which was more highly regarded.

Aboulnasr earned a bachelor's degree in electrical engineering from Cairo University in Cairo, Egypt, and earned a master's degree and Ph.D. in electrical engineering from Queen's University in Kingston, Ontario, Canada.

== Career ==
In 1999, Aboulnasr was appointed Dean of Engineering at the University of Ottawa, the first woman in the school's history to hold that position. From 2008 to 2011, she was Dean of the Faculty of Applied Sciences at the University of British Columbia. She subsequently worked with Nile University for the development of Egypt.

== Awards and honors ==
Aboulnasr was elected as a Fellow of the Engineering Institute of Canada and a Fellow of the Canadian Academy of Engineering in 2002 and 2003, respectively. She was named one of the 100 most influential women in British Columbia in 2010, and in 2012, she received the Queen's Elizabeth II Diamond Jubilee Medal.

== Personal ==
Aboulnasr is active in Arab-Jewish dialogue groups, and she is a black belt in taekwondo and rides motorcycles. She is the mother of three children and began practicing taekwondo in her 40s.

== Selected research ==
- A. Majumdar, R. K. Ward and T. Aboulnasr, "Compressed Sensing Based Real-Time Dynamic MRI Reconstruction," in IEEE Transactions on Medical Imaging, vol. 31, no. 12, pp. 2253-2266, Dec. 2012, doi: 10.1109/TMI.2012.2215921.
- H. Othman and T. Aboulnasr, "A separable low complexity 2D HMM with application to face recognition," in IEEE Transactions on Pattern Analysis and Machine Intelligence, vol. 25, no. 10, pp. 1229-1238, Oct. 2003, doi: 10.1109/TPAMI.2003.1233897.
- T. Aboulnasr and K. Mayyas, "A robust variable step-size LMS-type algorithm: analysis and simulations," in IEEE Transactions on Signal Processing, vol. 45, no. 3, pp. 631-639, March 1997, doi: 10.1109/78.558478.
- M. K. Mandal, T. Aboulnasr and S. Panchanathan, "Image indexing using moments and wavelets," in IEEE Transactions on Consumer Electronics, vol. 42, no. 3, pp. 557-565, Aug. 1996, doi: 10.1109/30.536156.
- T. Aboulnasr and K. Mayyas, "Complexity reduction of the NLMS algorithm via selective coefficient update," in IEEE Transactions on Signal Processing, vol. 47, no. 5, pp. 1421-1424, May 1999, doi: 10.1109/78.757235.
