= EcoCash =

Coordinates: 17°47′01″S 31°04′47″E

EcoCash (Pvt) Limited
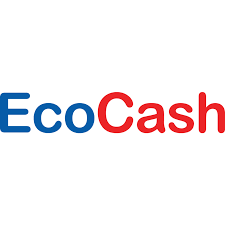
- Type: Subsidiary
- Traded as: EHZL
- Industry: Banking; Financial services Fintech; Nano Loans
- Founded: 29 September 2011; 14 years ago in Harare, Zimbabwe
- Headquarters: Harare, Zimbabwe
- Key people: Strive Masiyiwa (Founder) Munyaradzi Nhamo (Chief Operating Officer) Eddie Chibi (Group Chief Executive Officer)
- Products: Mobile banking
- Website: www.ecocash.co.zw

EcoCash is a mobile phone-based money transfer, financing and microfinancing service, launched in 2011 by Econet Wireless, for its customers in Zimbabwe. The platform has been targeted by the Zimbabwe government. The company's headquarters is in the EcoCash Holdings HQ along Liberation Legacy Road in Borrowdale, a suburb of Harare, the largest city and capital of Zimbabwe.

Econet allows users to deposit, withdraw, transfer money and pay for goods and services, including utility bills, from a mobile handset. Users can also buy pre-paid airtime or data bundles for themselves or others. Users can also redeem stored mobile money for cash. A fee for each service is deducted directly from the account stored on the mobile phone and accessed using a PIN. Users can deposit and withdraw money, transfer money to other users, pay bills including water, electricity, cable, satellite and school fees, purchase airtime, and transfer money between the service and a regular bank account. The service can be used from branches of ZimPost. EcoCash provides international remittance services in partnership with major global remittance partners such as MoneyGram and PayPal

As of November 2017, EcoCash was reported to have 6.7 million registered users, compared with 2 million conventional bank account holders in the country. It controlled 99.8 percent of the mobile money market in Zimbabwe at the time. During the first six years of existence, the service processed over $23 billion. In 2017, Zimbabwe's GDP was valued at US$22 billion.

== History ==
Econet Wireless Zimbabwe, a wireless telecommunications company based in Zimbabwe announced in 2011 that they were launching a mobile money transfer service called EcoCash. The service was primarily targeted at Econet subscribers who would send money via text message to recipients who would cash out funds at an EcoCash agent. Large merchants such as OK Zimbabwe and TM Supermarket were recruited as partners for facilitating cash in and cash out transactions. Small and Medium Enterprises (SMEs) were also recruited as partners in the service to broaden the reach and accessibility of the service.

== See also ==
- InnBucks
- Digital currency
- Natalie Payida Jabangwe
- M-Pesa
