= Rabiatu Dienyo Ammah =

Rabiatu Dienyo Ammah is a Ghanaian Islamic theologian and a former Council of State member under the former President of Ghana John Mahama. She is a member of The Circle of Concerned African Women Theologians.

== Education and career ==
She received her MA and PhD in theology from the University of Birmingham, England, and attended the Centre for the Study of Islam and Christian-Muslim Relations at Selly Oak Colleges in Birmingham.

At the Department for the Study of Religions, she has taught a number of courses since 1990, including Islam and Development, Muslim Family Law, Islamic Law, Gender Issues in Religion and Culture, and the History of Islam at the undergraduate and graduate levels.

== Academic awards and appointments ==
She won the best teacher award of the University of Ghana in the year 2000. In 2013, she served as the Greater Accra Regional representative on the Council of State board.
