= Mila Aziablé =

Togolese engineer and politician

- Born: c. 1 January 1991 (age 35); Togo
- Citizenship: Togo
- Education: University of Lomé; École Nationale d'Ingénieurs de Metz; Mines ParisTech; Paris Institute of Political Studies
- Occupations: Engineer, Politician
- Years active: 2012 — present
- Known for: Intelligence, Efficiency
- Title: Minister Delegate to the President for Energy and Mines

Mawougno Mila Ami Aziablé, commonly referred to as Mila Aziablé, is a Togolese engineer and politician, who serves as the Minister Delegate to the President for Energy and Mines in the Cabinet of Togo, since 1 October 2020.

== Background and education ==
Mila is a native of Togo, born circa 1991. She attended high school in Lomé. She was then admitted to the University of Lomé, in its National School of Engineering (ENSI).

Due to academic excellence, Mila was awarded a scholarship to study engineering in Metz, France. In 2012, Mila graduated with a degree in mechanical engineering from the École Nationale d'Ingénieurs de Metz (ENIM), (National Engineering School of Metz), a public engineering school.

The following year, she was admitted to the Ecole Nationale Supérieure des Mines de Paris (Paris National Superior College of Mines), commonly referred to as Mines ParisTech. While there, she specialized in Gas Engineering and Management.

In 2018, she was admitted to the Paris Institute of Political Studies (Sciences Po), graduating from there with an executive master's degree in development and management policies.

== Career ==
Following the completion of her graduate studies, Mila was employed as a "gas operations engineer" at GRTgaz, a subsidiary of the French industrial group ENGIE.

In October 2020, Mila, aged 29 years at that time, was named Minister Delegate to the President of the Republic of Togo, responsible for Energy and Mines. She is the youngest cabinet member. She replaced Marc Ably Bidamon who served in that role between 2015 and 2020.

== See also ==
- Cabinet of Togo
- Victoire Tomegah Dogbé
