= Ayorkor Korsah =

Ghanaian professor of computer science and robotics

- Education: BA, Dartmouth College; BE, MS, Thayer School of Engineering; PhD, Carnegie Mellon University
- Occupations: Computer engineer and Lecturer

G. Ayorkor Korsah (formerly G. Ayorkor Mills-Tettey) is a Senior Lecturer in Computer Science and Robotics at Ashesi University in Ghana.

== Early life and education ==
Korsah grew up in Ghana and Nigeria, and as a child, she wanted to be an astronaut and an engineer.

Korsah majored in engineering at Dartmouth College, graduating summa cum laude in June 2003. She attended Carnegie Mellon University for her doctoral work in computer science, obtaining a PhD in 2011 for her thesis: "Exploring bounded optimal coordination for heterogeneous teams with cross-schedule dependencies".

== Career ==
Korsah is a senior lecturer in computer science and robotics at Ashesi University, a private university in Ghana, where she teaches courses in artificial intelligence, robotics, algorithms, and programming.

To expand robotics education in Africa, Korsah co-founded the African Robotics Network (AFRON) in 2012 with Ken Goldberg, a robotics professor at the University of California, Berkeley. The purpose of AFRON is to enhance robotics education and encourage members of robotics communities in Africa to collaborate. One of AFRON's first endeavors was a $10 robot design challenge which it co-sponsored with the IEEE Robotics and Automation Society. Korsah and Goldberg were awarded the 2013 Tribeca Disruptive Innovation Award for their work in founding the network and the "$10 Robot Design” challenge.

Korsah has been featured on BBC News discussing how humans and machines can collaborate and combine their strengths in the future.

== Selected publications ==
- G. Ayorkor Korsah, Anthony Stentz, and M. Bernardine Dias, “A comprehensive taxonomy for multi-robot task allocation”, The International Journal of Robotics Research, October 2013, vol. 32, no.12, pp. 1495-1512.
- G. Ayorkor Korsah, Balajee Kannan, Brett Browning, Anthony Stentz and M. Bernardine Dias, “xBots: An Approach to Generating and Executing Optimal Multi-Robot Plans with Cross-Schedule Dependencies,” 2012 IEEE International Conference on Robotics and Automation (ICRA), May 2012.
- G. Ayorkor Korsah, Jack Mostow, M. Bernardine Dias, Tracy Morrison Sweet, Sarah M. Belousov, M. Frederick Dias, Haijun Gong, “Improving Child Literacy in Africa: Experiments with an Automated Reading Tutor,” Information Technologies & International Development, 2010, vol. 6, no. 2, 2010.

== See also ==
- Ashesi University
- African women in engineering
