= Adiat Disu =

Nigerian-American entrepreneur

Adiat Sade Disu
- Born: January 10, 1988 (age 38); Nigeria
- Citizenship: United States
- Education: Bentley University (BSc in information technology, marketing and communications)
- Occupations: Business executive, multi-media, marketing, information technology

Adiat Sade Disu (born 1988) is an American marketing communications executive in mass media, advertising, information technology, and consumer products. Her parents are Nigerian and Ghanaian.

She founded a multi-media marketing and advertising agency called Adirée, offering cross-cultural campaigns, content, and retail sales services, with headquarters in New York. Adirée founded the annual consumer-marketing & media platform AfricaFashionWeek.com, with off-shoots in local cities (such as Africa Fashion Week New York during New York Fashion Week in 2009).

Disu also writes for Entrepreneur magazine.

== Background and education ==
Disu studied at Phillips Exeter Academy in Exeter, New Hampshire. She graduated from Bentley University in Waltham, Massachusetts in 2008, with a Bachelor of Science in Information Technology, Marketing & Communications. She then atteded Tuck School of Business at Dartmouth College, where she received executive education in Digital Leadership and Management.

== Career ==
In February 2009, straight out of university, Disu established an omni-medial, marketing and retail company with headquarters in New York and a satellite branch in Lagos, Nigeria. The group's client list includes corporate and social enterprises, government and non-for-profit agencies, individual lifestyle, and media brands such as Verisk Analytics, Hearst Magazines, Kimora Lee Simmons' beauty brand Shinto Clinical, Iman Cosmetics, Pikolinos Shoes, and United States Agency for International Development, as well as celebrities like Korto Momolu and Akon.

== Honors and recognition ==
Disu and her work have been recognized in:

- 2011: CNN, founder of media and marketing platform: Africa Fashion Week
- 2011: Washington Post, Creatives Bringing Africa to the World
- 2011: Bullet Magazine, Wrap It Up
- 2012: Black Enterprise, Everyday Hero
- 2013: Huffington Post, founder of Africa Fashion Week, produced by Adirée
- 2013: Huffington Post, Africa Fashion Week
- 2013: Global Post, Adiree, communications and brand strategy firm
- 2014: Forbes Magazine, "30 Under 30"
- 2014: Black Enterprise, founder of Adiree, in New York for Africa's global leaders
- 2015: The Africa Channel, Adirée
- 2016: Huffington Post, Adiat Disu, entrepreneur, and Forbes' "30 Under 30"
- 2017: Entrepreneur magazine, information technology and communications executive
