= Raquel Naa Ayorkor Ammah =

Ghanaian musician

- Born: August 12 1987; United Kingdom
- Occupation: Musician
- Notable work: Known for the hit song "sweetio"
- Awards: Best Female Artist 2012 at YFM All Star Weekend Awards

Raquel Naa Ayorkor Ammah (born 12 August 1987), popularly known on the music scene as Raquel, is a Ghanaian musician, composer, choreographer, actress and script writer. She is popularly known for her hit song "Sweetio" which featured Sarkodie.

== Early life ==
Raquel was born in the United Kingdom by Ghanaian parents. She grew up in West London with her mother, two brothers and a sister. Raquel attended many schools because her family moved houses a few times. However, her favourite schools remained Hogarth Primary School based in Chiswick, and West Thames College. She attended Hounslow Manor School for her second cycle education, where she studied English Literature and Drama in sixth form. At West Thames College, she pursued a National Diploma in Performing Arts, taking additional classes in dance and choreography. Raquel later enrolled in a BA in Drama, Theatre and Performance Studies at Roehampton University (formerly University of Surrey Roehampton), completing two years before taking a gap year to focus on her music career.

== Career ==
Raquel officially entered the music scene in 2005 when she signed with BlackStar SR Entertainment while in the UK, and has since shared the same stage with international acts like Mario, Movado, Young (U.S) Lloyd (U.S), Kas (Nigeria), Cabbo Snoop (Angola), Duncan Mighty (Nigeria), Stephanie Benson (UK/Ghana).. Prior to that, alongside her elder sister, she formed the musical duo "The Sister Act, writing original songs, singing, rapping, and choreographing dance routines, often performing informally for small audiences . She relocated to Accra to further her music career with the help of her record label in the late 2000. Raquel released "Odo" as her official hit single in July 2010.

Her acting career began with stage performances during her studies in drama and performing arts. She took a lead role of Maria in a stage adaptation of the classic musical The Sound of Music. In film, Ammah made her starring debut as 'Black Rose', an ambitious young singer, in the 2020 Afro-noir drama Gold Coast Lounge, directed by Pascal Aka and featuring co-stars such as Adjetey Anang and Zynnell Zuh.

== Philanthropy ==
As part of her social responsibility, Raquel has voluntarily been a mentor for a private charity within her local community in Ghana called Christ Humanitarian Foundation (CHF). She acts as a public advocate for the foundation to help them raise funds each year.

== Awards and nominations ==
In 2019, she won Best Original Song at the Ghana Movie Awards for "Have You Seen My Love", the soundtrack for the film Gold Coast Lounge. She won the Best Female Artist 2012, at the YFM All Star Weekend Awards in December 2012. She also had one nomination at the Hip Hop and RnB Awards 2011. In September 2013, Ammah received the National Youth Adorable Female Artist of the Year award at the third edition of the Ghana High School Entertainment Awards, held at the National Theatre in Accra.

She was nominated at the Ghana Hip Hop and RnB Awards for the Female R&B Artiste of the Decade and Contemporary R&B Artiste of the Year. She was also nomination for Best Female Video at the Vodafone 4syte Music Video Awards, for her single "Odo". She also received five nominations at the 2012 Vodafone Ghana Music Awards, including New Artist of the Year (technical), Best Female Vocalist for "Sweetio" featuring Sarkodie, Afro Pop Song of the Year for the same track, and Best Collaboration of the Year for both "Sweetio" and "Aajeiii" featuring Trigmatic; none resulted in wins.

== Notable Songs ==
- Sweetio (feat. Sarkodie)
- Odo (feat. Sarkodie)
- Set me free
- Ke Ha Me
- Lovi Dovi
- Woara (feat. Okyeame Kwame)
- Girlfriend (Edem feat. Raquel)
- Fire
- I slay
- EP, The Gospel of the Broken (2026)
- Aajeiii (Triglatic feat. Raquel)
