= Chirundu–Beitbridge Regional Road Corridor =

Route in Zimbabwe

Coordinates: 16.04187°S 28.86148°E

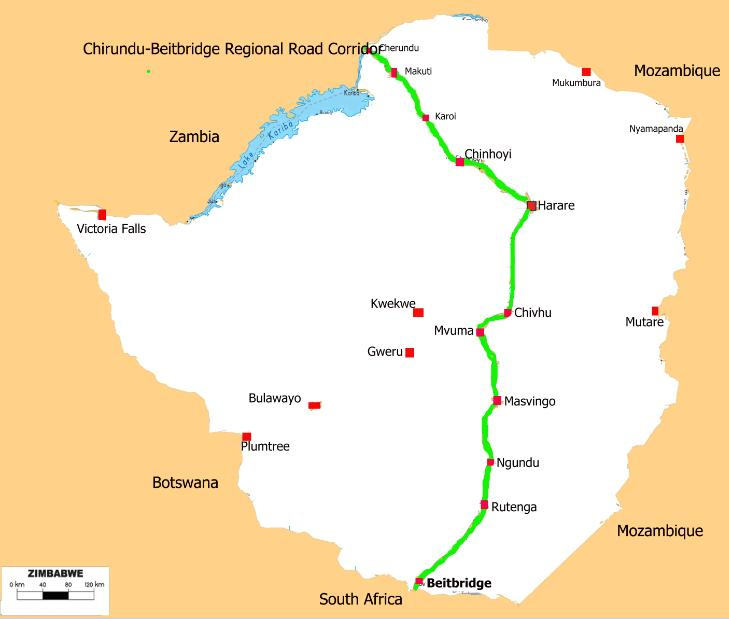
Chirundu=Beitbridge Highway

Chirundu–Beitbridge Road Corridor is a Trans-African Highway Network Zimbabwean link between South Africa and Zambia. It is part of the North–South Corridor Project and forms the entire Zimbabwean section of the Cape to Cairo Road.

The North-South Multimodal Transport Corridor is under the African Union PIDA. The Programme for Infrastructure Development in Africa (PIDA) is an all-Africa program to develop a vision, policies and strategies for development of priority trans-regional and continental infrastructure, which includes transport, hence the rehabilitation of regional road corridors. The African Development Bank being the Executing Agency for the Programme.

The local road corridor has two legs; the Chirundu–Harare and the Harare–Beitbridge highways.

The road has been divided into sections described here as "links" and the rehabilitation of the highway is being carried out in various "links" which would eventually see the whole route done. The links are numbered from north to south; from Chirundu border with Zambia to Beitbridge border with South Africa.

== Chirundu-Harare ==
=== Background ===
The Chirundu-Harare Highway which is a regional road corridor is designated as the R3 Highway and the A1 Highway on Zimbabwe's Road Network. It runs generally in a south-easterly direction from Chirundu Border Post to Harare, a distance of 348 kilometres (216 mi). The Chirundu-Harare Highway is part of the Regional Trunk Road Network (RTRN Link Nr 22) as well as the Trans-African Highway Nr 9 (Beira-Lobito Highway).

On the Zambian side the highway continues north as T2 Highway, through Zambia's Capital City (Lusaka), to Tunduma, the border between Zambia and Tanzania.

Major local and regional trunk routes in Zimbabwe are fully paved and of modern design. However most of them, including this one needs retouching.

=== Operations ===
The North-South Corridor Aid-for-Trade Programme's specific objective is to contribute to the upgrading of the Chirundu-Harare Highway section of the North-South Corridor road network through rehabilitation of the highway. The Chirundu to Harare section of the Regional Trunk Road Network (RTRN Link Nr 22) has 4 road links to be rehabilitated.

=== Link 1 Chirundu–Makuti ===
Link 1 runs a distance of 75 kilometres (47 mi) from Chirundu Border Post to Hells Gate. This section covers the Zambezi Escapement area. It is mountainous and has a number of very steep passes. In this section of the road there is a turn-off (to the right or east) to Manna Pools and the Hurungwe Safari Area.

At the end of this link is Makuti, an important waypoint for those travelling straight ahead and those turning right into P12 Highway to Kariba.

=== Link 2 Makuti–Karoi ===
Link 2 runs a distance of 78 kilometres (48 mi) from Makuti to Karoi. Unlike Link 1, this section has moderate curves and slopes. Charara Safari area lies left (west) for about 25 kilometres (16 mi) stretch of this highway section from Makuti.

=== Link 3 Karoi–Chinhoyi ===
Link 3 covers a distance of 94 kilometres (58 mi) from Karoi to Chinhoyi. This road runs south-easterly all the way to Chinhoyi. Travellers to Chegutu, through to Gweru can branch right in Chinhoyi into P13 Highway popularly known as the Chegutu-Chinhoyi Highway.

=== Link 4 Chinhoyi-Harare ===
Link 4 section covers 115 kilometres (71 mi) from Chinhoyi to Harare. Harare is the capital city of Zimbabwe. Here lap number 2 of the Chirundu–Beitbridge Regional Road Corridor begins; the R1 Highway popularly known as the Harare–Beitbridge Highway.

== Harare–Beitbridge Highway ==
The road runs in a southern direction from Harare to Beitbridge Border Post (between Zimbabwe and South Africa), covering a total distance of 571 km. The Harare–Beitbridge road is part of the Regional Trunk Road Network (RTRN Link Nr 25).

On the South African it joins the N1 Highway which runs the whole length of South Africa to Cape Town.

=== Link 5 Harare–Chivhu ===
Link 5 is after the capital city Harare, and it covers 141 kilometres (88 mi) to Chivhu. Here in Chivhu the R6 Highway branches right (east) to Nyazura.

=== Link 6 Chivhu–Masvingo ===
This section of the Harare–Beitbridge Highway covers 151 kilometres (94 mi) from Chivhu to Masvingo. About one third distance from Chivhu, the Gweru-Mvuma Highway braches right (west) on its approximately 83 kilometres (52 mi) to the Midlands capital city of Gweru linking this highway with R2 Highway to Bulawayo and Plumtree. In Masvingo the A9 Highway crosses from the left, (the Mutare via Birchenough Bridge end) to the right to Mashava, Zvishavane, Filabusi and Mbalabala.

=== Link 7 Masvingo-Turn Off (Ngundu) ===
Link 7 covers a distance of 95 kilometres (59 mi) from Masvingo to Turn Off. This place called Turn Off is the turn-off to Chiredzi, and its where the P5 Highway popularly known as the Chiredzi-Tanganda Hifhway begins.

=== Link 8 Ngundu–Beitbridge ===
This section covers 184 km from Turn Off to Beitbridge Border Post. Just less than halfway to Beitbridge lies Nuanetsi Game Ranch to the left, after Rutenga.

Beitbridge is the border between South Africa and Zimbabwe. It is the busiest of all in Southern Africa, both in commercial traffic and the movement of people.

== See also ==
- ZINARA
