= Zimbabwe National Road Administration =

Zimbabwean government agency in charge of road maintenance

The Zimbabwe National Road Administration (ZINARA) is a Zimbabwean parastatal responsible for the management, maintenance and development of Zimbabwe's national road network.

== Background ==
The Zimbabwe National Road Administration (ZINARA) falls under the Ministry of Transport, Communication and Infrastructural Development and was established in August 2001, in terms of the Roads Act of 2001 with the aim of enhancing road network system throughout the Zimbabwe.

ZINARA's vision and mission is to become a world class road manager, providing secure, stable and adequate reservoir of funds, to fund effectively maintenance of the national road network through fixing, collection, disbursement and monitoring of funds usage for preservation, enhancement and sustainable development.

== Governance ==
ZINARA is run under the Ministry of Transport, Communication and Infrastructural Development

ZINARA consists of a part-time Board of Directors which serves for a three-year period, and a full-time CEO. It has 12 board members and 7 senior managers in 7 departments.

=== Board Members ===
ZINARA Board Members as of Monday, 8 October 2019 were 12 members:

• The Board Chairman

• The Vice - Board Chairman

• The 10 Board Members

=== Executive team ===
The ZINARA Executive team as on Monday, 28 October 2019 were as follows:

• Mr. Nkosinathi Ncube (CEO)

• Mr. G. Moyo (Director: Administration)

• Mrs. V. Muzite (Company Secretary)

== Road Authorities ==
The Zimbabwe National Road Administration (ZINARA) is responsible for managing the Road Fund and disbursing the local road authorities. The local road authorities are:

• The Department of Roads in the Ministry of Transport and Infrastructure Development which is responsible for trunk roads.

• The Urban Councils responsible for urban roads.

• The Rural District Councils (RDC) and the District Development Fund (DDF) which are responsible rural roads.

== Road Network ==
The road network excluding urban roads totals 76,241 km of which 9,256 km or 12.1% are bitumen surfaced.

Road Network Thursday, 1 November 2012 10:31 Most of these roads are more than 30 years and therefore requires complete rehabilitation works. ZINARA has in the past 9 years been able to fund the routine and periodic maintenance countrywide.

=== Road Categories ===
Classified roads fall under three categories.

1. Regional Trunk Road Network (RTRN): Roads linking countries within southern African region.

2. Secondary Roads: Those roads that connect regional, primary, tertiary and urban roads, industrial and mining centers, tourist attractions and minor border posts are the secondary roads.

3. Tertiary Roads: Those roads which provide access to schools, health centers, dip tanks and other service facilities within a rural district council area or connect and provide access to secondary, primary and regional roads.

Total Road Network in Zimbabwe is 87,654 km which include the paved or unpaved, the urban, rural and state roads.

• State Highways 18,460 km

• Urban Roads 8,194 km

• Rural Roads 61,000 km

== Road Names ==
Road and Route numbers in Zimbabwe may differ depending on the route concerned.

Previously, national routes were denoted with the letter "A" followed by a number indicating the specific route. Today the "A" numbers are just Map Reference Numbers known by not much of the populace. (The term "national road" is frequently used to refer to a national route, but technically a "national road" is any road overseen by the ZINARA. A national road need not necessarily form part of a national route. )

Today primary roads on Zimbabwe are denoted with the letter "P" followed by a number indicating the specific route. Primary roads which are regional road corridors are denoted with the letter "R" followed by a number indicating the internal regional road corridor.

Unlike in South Africa where routes are clearly numbered and labeled as such, most roads in Zimbabwe are publicly known by their common names or destinations.

== Zimbabwe “A” Highways (1975) ==
SOURCES: [Automobile Association Map 1975]

[Map 9.2 Road Transport Network of Zimbabwe.]

List Number	Map Section Number	Trunk Road Number	Common name
1	A1	R3	Harare-Chirundu Highway
2	A2	R4	Harare-Nyamapanda Highway
3	A3	R5	Harare-Mutare Highway
4	A4	R1	Harare-Beitbridge Highway
5	A5	R2	Harare-Bulawayo Highway
6	A6	R9	Beitbridge-Gwanda Highway
7	A7	R2	Bulawayo Plumtree Highway
8	A8	R9	Victoria Falls Highway
9	A9	P4	Mutare-Masvingo Highway
10	A10	P5	Ngundu-Tanganda-Wengezi Road
11	A11	P1	Harare-Mt Darwin Highway
12	A12	-	Mazowe=Centenary Highway
13	A13	-	Harare-Shamva Highway
14	A14	-	Rusape-Juliusdale Highway
15	A15	-	Mutare-Nyanga Highway
16	A16	-	Birchenough Bridge-Chipinga Highway
17	A17	R7	Gweru-Mvuma Highway
18	A18	-	Gweru-Shurugwi
19	P12 highway	P12	Makuti-Kariba Highway

=== Primary Roads (Ordinary) ===
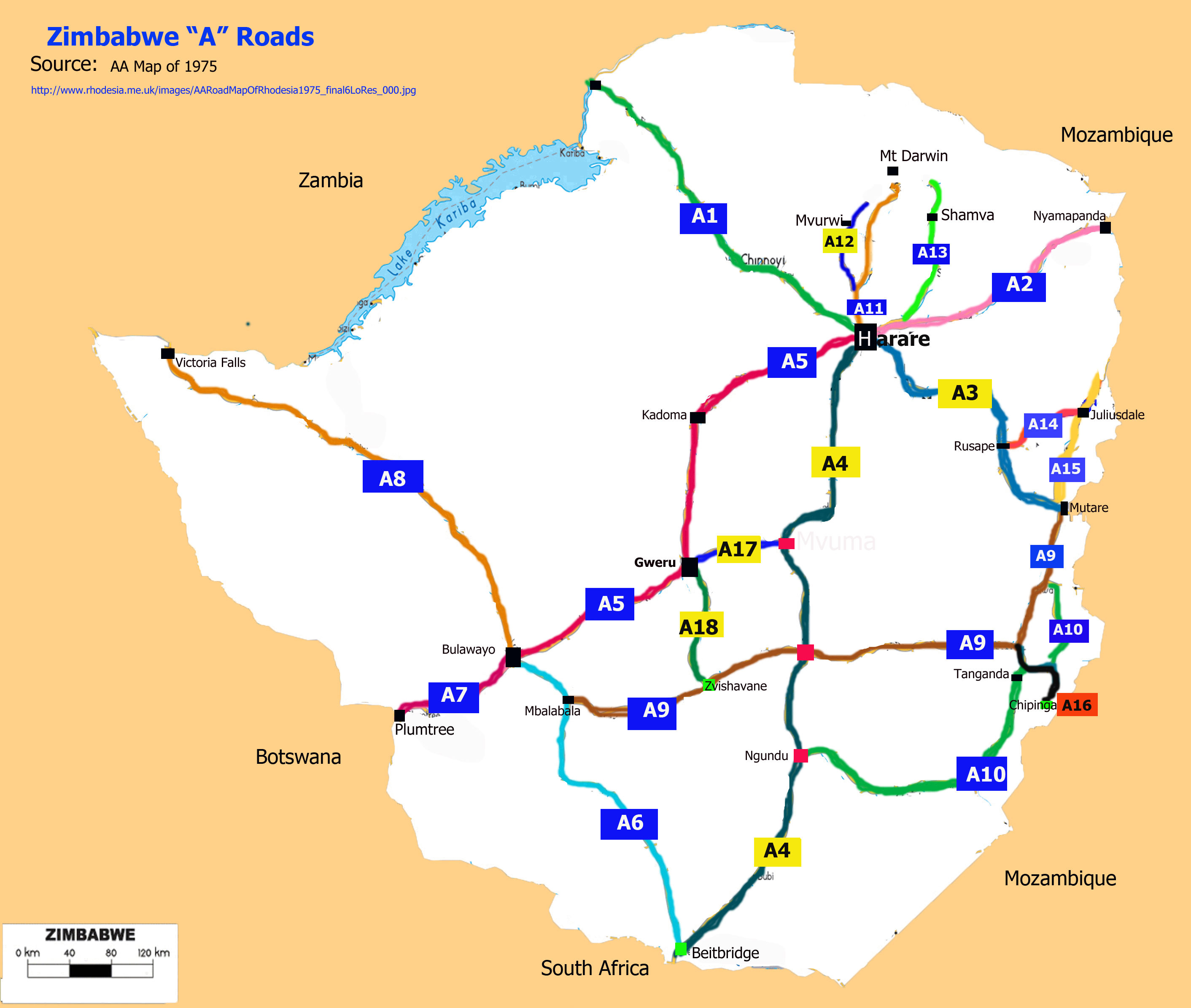
Zimbabwe "A" classified roads as of 1975

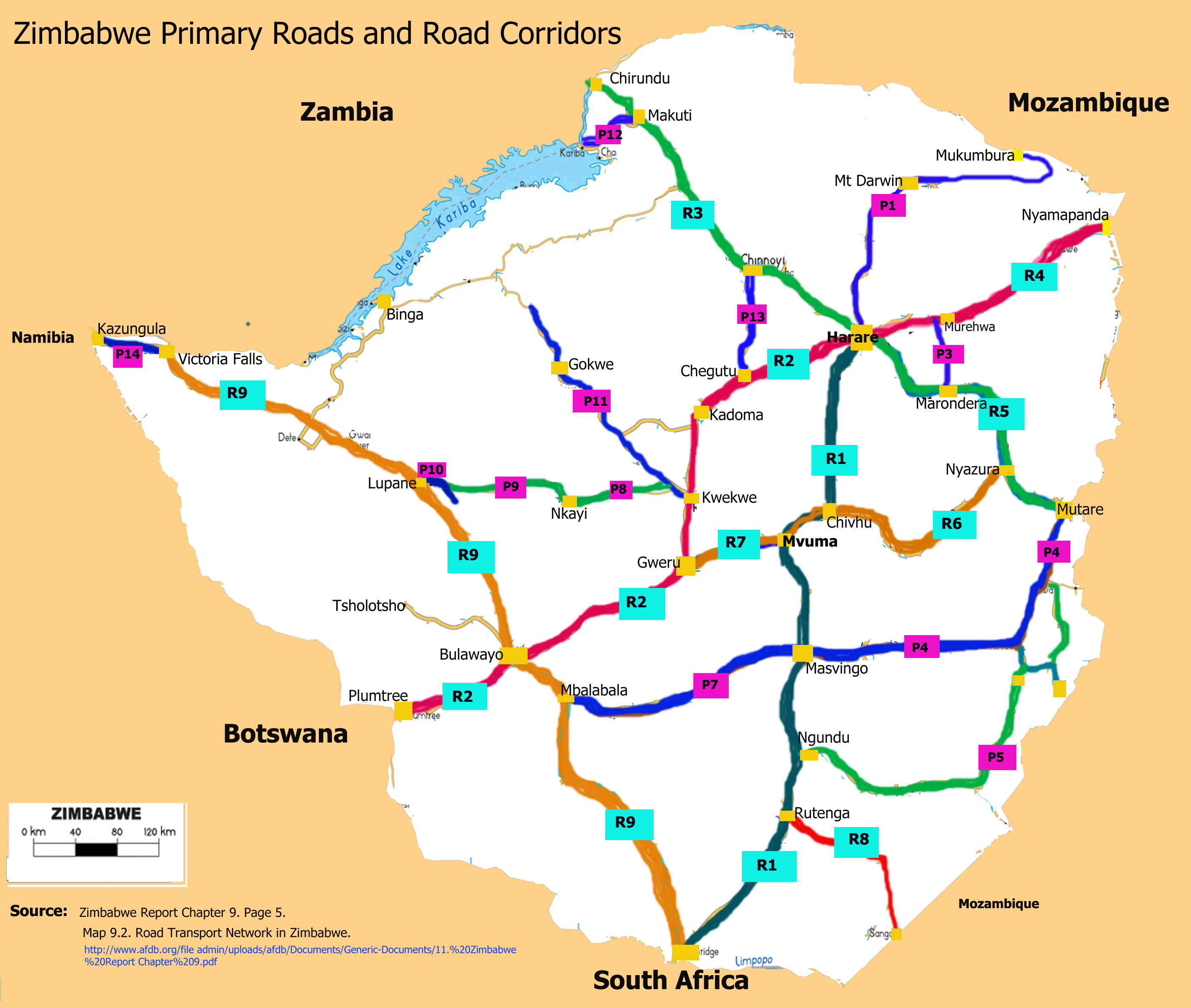
Zimbabwe Primary Roads

Source: [Map 9.2 Road Transport Network of Zimbabwe.]

Road	Alias	Common name	Remarks
P1	-	Harare-Mt Darwin-Mukumbura Road	The map is not clear on whether P1 is Mt Darwin-Mukumbura Road or Harare-Mukumbura Road via Mt Darwin.
P2	-	-	-
P3	Marondera-Murehwa Road	Macheke-Juru Road	
P4	A9	Mutare-Masvingo Road	A9 is a combination of this P4 and P7 to form the Mutare-Mbalabala Highway
P5	A10	Ngundu- Tanganda-Wengezi Road	A10 runs from Ngundu via Triangle and Tanganda to Wengezi ending at a T junction on the A9
P6	-	-	-
P7	A9	Masvingo-Mbalabala Road	A9 is a combination of this P7 and P4 to the Mutare-Mbalabala Highway
P8	Luveve-Nkayi Road	Kwekwe Nkayi Road	Luveve is where P8 branches off from the P11 popularly called Kwekwe-Gokwe Highway
P9	-	Nkayi-Lupane Road	P9 is a continuation of P8 to form the Kwekwe-Lupane Road.
P10	-	Lupane loop road	P10 branches off from the A8 and runs parallel to it connecting Lupane Centre to the Bulawayo-Victoria Falls Highway
P11	R847 Highway	Kwekwe-Gokwe Highway	This road eventually reaches Binga however not wholly paved
P12	P12 highway	Makuti-Kariba Highway	P12 highway is an international road that crosses the Zambezi River over the Kariba Dam
P13	-	Chegutu-Chinhoyi Highway	The P13 links the A1 and the A5 to short cut the Chirundu-Bulawayo route.
P14	-	Victoria Falls-Kazungula Road	This is the shortest route from Zambia to Botswana

=== Regional Road Corridors ===
Source: [Map 9.2 Road Transport Network of Zimbabwe.]

Road	Alias	Common name	Remarks
R1	A4	Harare-Beitbridge Highway	
R2	A5 & A7	Harare-Plumtree Highway	Two roads forming 1 route
R3	A1	Harare-Chirundu Highway	
R4	A2	Harare-Nyamapanda Highway	
R5	A3	Harare-Mutare Highway	
R6	-	Chivhu-Nyazura Highway	
R7	A17	Gweru-Mvuma Highway	
R8	-	Rutenga-Sango Road	Unpaved
R9	A6 & A8	Victoria Falls-Beitbridge Highway	Two roads forming 1 route

=== SADC Regional Trunk Road Network ===
Zimbabwe being a member state of SADC, ZINARA works in conjunction with other regional road authorities and it does its part on regional road corridors passing through Zimbabwe.

Regional Trunk Roads Network in Zimbabwe in proportion of total regional trunk roads are as follows:

• Reference Roads: 1 600 km (Regional total 29 300 km)

• Intermediate Roads: 1 000 km (Regional total 11 600 km)

• Branch, Link and Connecting Roads: 1 100 km (Regional total 21 700 km)

• Total 3 700 km (Regional total 62 600 km)

• Regional Percentage: 6% (Regional total 100%)

So ZINARA does only 6% of regional trunk roads.

(Source: Revised RIDMP Draft -Annexure 5.6 – Roads.)

==== SADC Numbered Roads ====
The regional organization, Southern African Development Community has its own numbered routes which usually are a combination of multiple roads across one or more member countries.

The Southern African Development Community Regional Trunk Road Network (SADC-RTRN) is a system of numbered road corridors in Southern Africa. The most important part of the network is the reference roads, which are major trans-regional routes.

== Operations ==
ZINARA’s core business, in consultations with the minister of transport, communication and infrastructural development is fixing road user charges and collect such charges or any other revenue of the road fund.

The Zimbabwe National Roads Administration (ZINARA)

• Fixes the levels of road user charges (RUC).

• Collects RUC as well as other revenue of the Road Fund.

• Sets maintenance, design, construction and technical standards.

• Monitors adherence to such standards by Road Authorities.

• Allocates and disburse to road authorities funds from the Road Fund in accordingly.

• Audits the use of funds from the Road Fund.

• Monitors implementation of road maintenance works by Road Authorities.

• Assists Road Authorities in making annual or multi-year road maintenance rolling plans.

== Road Fund ==
The Road Fund was established in terms of the Roads Act of 2001 with the objective to provide a stable, adequate, secure and sustainable source of funding for road maintenance work in Zimbabwe. The Road Fund comes from, Road user charges, Appropriations from Parliament and Grants. The fund is then used for routine and periodic road maintenance of roads and other roads related projects approved by the ZINARA Board.

The main source of ZINARA funds are the vehicle licence fees (30%), fuel levy (28%), toll roads (21%) and transit fees (19%). Toll roads fees could be the main contributor now because the toll gates have risen from 23 as of 2011 to 36 as of December 2015 nationwide.

=== International Transit Tolls ===
International transit tolls are collected from foreign buses and heavy goods vehicles at border posts as they enter Zimbabwe. These cross-border charges are levied according to the distance each vehicle is to travel while inside Zimbabwe. International transit coupons are purchased in advance in foreign currency, and the revenue is paid to ZINARA. Each transit vehicle along the RTRN is issued a permit which states the destination of that particular vehicle. Local and foreign light motor vehicles, as well as on local heavy motor vehicles entering Zimbabwe except those with coupons paid in advance, are levied with the Road Access Toll at all border posts. A flat rate, in cash, is charged in accordance with the vehicle category.

=== Toll Gates ===
Most highways linking cities are now toll roads following the construction of 36 toll plazas throughout the country. These are State of art tollgates are the first in the world to be 100% self-sufficient and solar powered.

Toll Points Table

Plaza number	Map Section Number	Trunk Road Number	Common name	Toll Plaza	Location	Nearest Center
1	A3	R5	Harare-Mutare Highway	Ruwa	17°57′51″S 31°18′36″E	35.11 km from Harare
2	A3	R5	Harare-Mutare Highway	Crocodile	18°24′25″S 32°08′39″E	14 km from Rusape
3	A3	R5	Harare-Mutare Highway	Riverside	18°55′46″S 32°32′33″E	18 km from Mutare
4	A2	R4	Harare-Nyamapanda Highway	Enterprise Road	17°44′16″S 30°12′10″E	20 km from Harare
5	A1	R3	Harare-Chirundu Highway	Inkomo	17°41′43″S 30°44′45″E	43 km from Harare
6	A1	R3	Harare-Chirundu Highway	Lions' Den	17°16′27″S 30°02′30″E	22 km from Chinhoyi
7	A5	R2	Harare-Bulawayo Highway	Norton	17°56′18″S 30°39′00″E	44.5 km from Harare
8	A5	R2	Harare-Bulawayo Highway	Kadoma	18°25′44″S 29°49′53″E	14 km from Kadoma
9	A4	R1	Harare-Beitbridge Highway	Skyline	17°58′12″S 30°58′12″E	19 km from Harare
10	A4	R1	Harare-Beitbridge Highway	Mushagashi	19°47′30″S 30°43′57″E	32 km from Masvingo
11	A11	P1	Harare-Mt Darwin Highway	Eskbank	17°41′30″S 30°00′28″E	18 km from Harare
12	A5	R2	Harare-Bulawayo Highway	Treetop	19°34′30″S 30°43′48″E	17 km from Gweru
13	A5	R2	Bulawayo-Gweru	Cement	20°06′45″S 28°41′09″E	17 km from Bulawayo
14	A18	-	Gweru-Shurugwi	Flamingo	19°30′08″S 29°54′17″E	10 km from Gweru
15	A17	R7	Gweru-Mvuma Highway	Sino	19°47′30″S 30°43′57″E	37 km from Gweru
16	A7	R2	Bulawayo-Plumtree Highway	Figtree	20°22′14″S 28°19′36″E	36.8 km from Bulawayo
17	A8	R9	Victoria Falls Highway	Cindêrella	18°20′33″S 26°22′02″E	6 km from Hwange
18	A8	R9	Victoria Falls Highway	Umguza Turn Off	20°00′46″S 28°32′26″E	18 km from Bulawayo
19	A6	R9	Beitbridge-Gwanda Highway	Naude Quarry	22°08′44″S 29°59′14″E	11.7 km from Beitbridge
20	A6	R9	Bulawayo-Beitbridge Highway	Esigodini	20°17′07″S 28°52′46″E	37 km from Bulawayo
21	A4	R1	Masvingo-Beitbridge Highway	Lutumba	22°04′51″S 30°07′30″E	23 km from Beitbridge
22	A4	R1	Masvingo-Beitbridge Highway	Chivi Turn Off	20°24′55″S 30°41′06″E	45 km from Masvingo
23	A9	P4	Mutare-Masvingo Highway	Mashayamvura	19°13′54″S 32°35′16″E	32 km from Mutare
24	A9	P7	Masvingo-Bulawayo Highway	Mashava	20°06′21″S 30°23′21″E	54 km from Masvingo
25	-	-	Harare-Seke Road	Seke-Chitungwiza	18°02′01″S 31°09′59″E	35.1 km from Harare
26	-	-	-	-	-	-
27	A4	R1	Harare-Masvingo Highway	Honeyspruit	Between 126–127 km peg	14 km before Chivhu
28	A4	R1	Masvingo-Beitbridge Highway	Mwenezi	Between 171–172 km peg	25.5 km from Rutenga
29	A1	R3	Harare-Chirundu Highway	Karoi	Between 224.5-225.5 km peg	21 km from Karoi
30	-	P14	Victoria Falls-Kazungula Road	Kazungula	Between 13–14 km peg	13.3 km from Victoria Falls
31	A6	R9	Bulawayo-Beitbridge Highway	Colleen Bawn	Between 155–156 km peg	29.5 km from Gwanda
32	A9	P4	Mutare-Masvingo Highway	Lothian	Between 260–261 km peg	37 km before Masvingo
33	A11	P1	Harare-Bindura-Mt.Darwin Highway	Mfurudzi	Between 112–112 km peg	24 km from Bindura
34	-	R6	Chivhu-Nyazura Highway	Magamba	Between 17.0-18.0 km peg	17.5 km from Chivhu
35	A10	P5	Ngundu-Tanganda-Wengezi Road	Triangle	Between 70.5-71.5 km peg	9 km before Triangle
36	A9	P4	Mutare-Masvingo Road	Dewure	Between 147–148 km peg	22 km from Birchenough Bridge

(Soueces) BigSky.co.zw

== See also ==
• Transport in Zimbabwe

• Ministry of Transport, Communication and Infrastructural Development

- Trans-African Highway Network
