= R1 road (Zimbabwe) =

Road in Zimbabwe

Harare - Beitbridge Highway
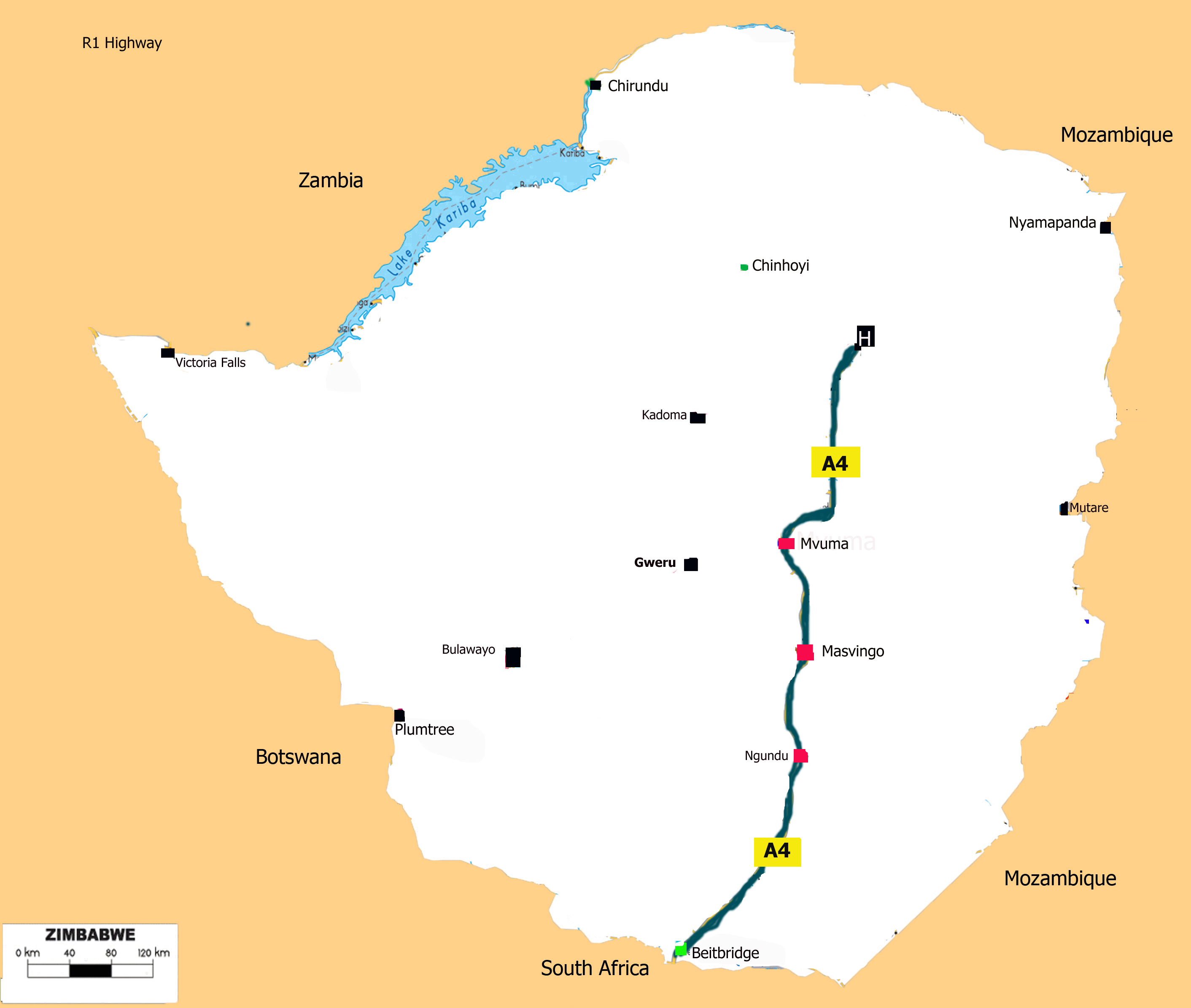

Route information
- Length: 360 mi (580 km)

Major junctions
- From: Beitbridge
- To: Harare

Location
- Country: Zimbabwe
- Provinces: Matabeleland South, Masvingo, Midlands, Mashonaland East, Harare

Highway system
- Transport in Zimbabwe

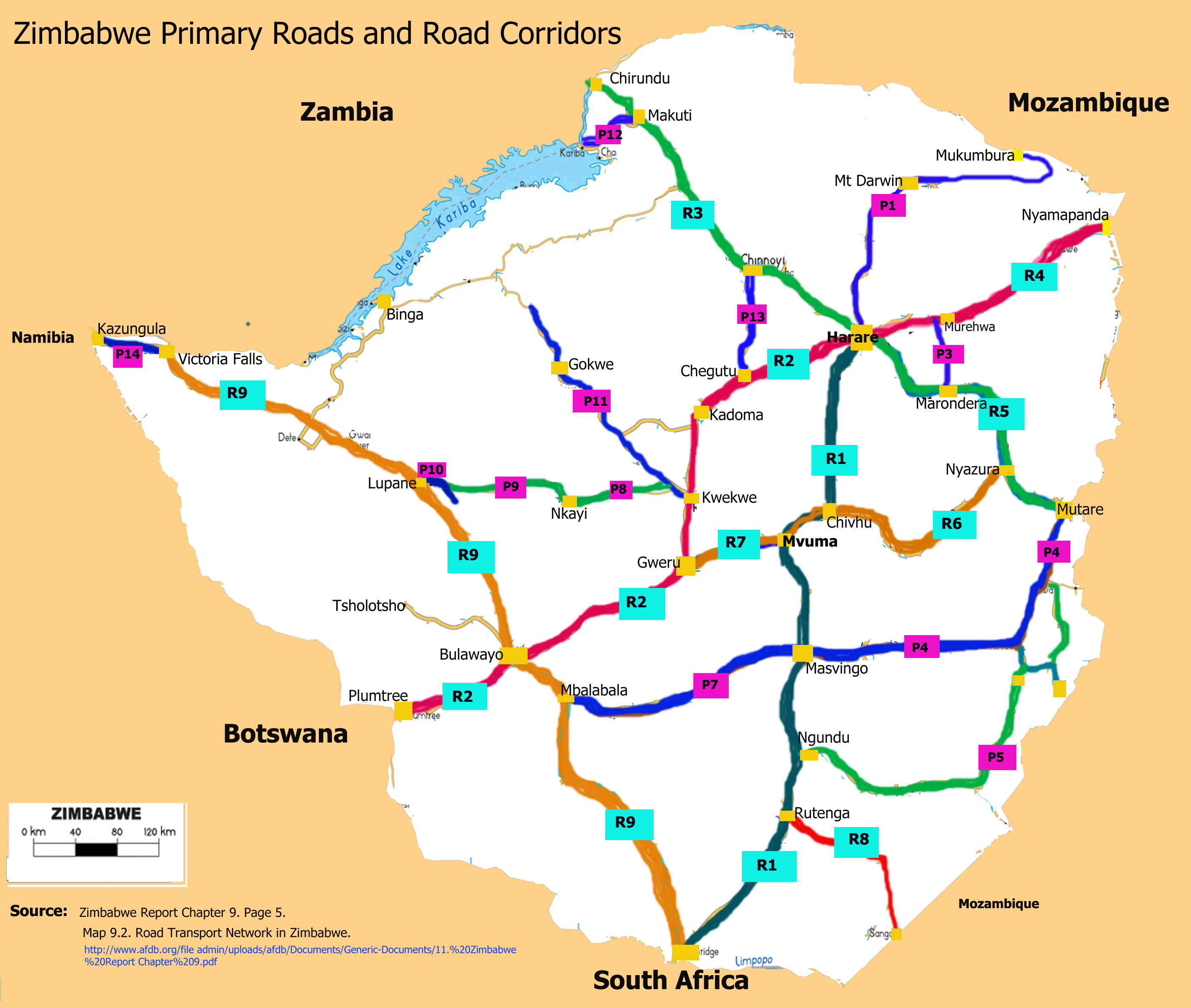
Zimbabwe Primary Roads

The R1 is a highway, previously known as the A4, which runs between Beitbridge and Harare. From Beitbridge it passes through Rutenga, Ngundu, Masvingo, Mvuma, Chivhu before reaching Harare.

== Background ==
=== Pan African Highway Link ===
The R1 Highway together with the R3 Highway which runs from Harare to Chirundu forms the Chirundu-Beitbridge Regional Road Corridor, which is part of the North-South Corridor known as the Cape to Cairo Road (Chirundu to Beitbridge 897 kilometres, 557 miles).

== Rehabilitation ==
The highway is set for rehabilitation as part of the ongoing national roads project and as an important link to the Trans-African Highway.

The R1 is the most direct link between the capital cities of Harare and Pretoria, and together with the R3 provide Zambia access to the Indian Ocean ports. The road carries between 1,000 and 5,000 vehicles per day, with the heavier flows in the proximity of Harare. It is therefore proper to rehabilitate this road. The Harare-Beitbridge road is part of the trunk road network of Zimbabwe, which is a part of the North-South Corridor – one of the major arterial links in the regional road network. The road is the most direct link between the capital cities of Harare and Pretoria, and provides landlocked Zambia access to the Indian Ocean ports of Durban and Richards Bay in South Africa.

== Waypoints ==
Major way points are

- Chivhu
- Mvuma
- Masvingo
- Ngundu
- Rutenga

== Junctions ==
Junctions here are in North to South; Harare to Beitbridge order. These are major junctions only (trunk roads).

=== R6 Highway ===
The R6 Highway also known as the Chivhu-Nyazura Highway branches east from Chivhu.

=== R7 Highway ===
R7 Highway branches west at Mvuma to Gweru. Also called A17 or Gweru-Mvuma Road

A17 Gweru-Mvuma Road

=== P4/A9 Highway ===
A9 branches east at Masvingo to Mutare via Birchnough Bridge. P4 is part of the A9 that runs from Mutare to Mbalabala.

A9 Highway starts in Mutare city center as Herbert Chitepo Street at the intersect with Robert Mugabe Avenue which is the A3 Highway to Harare. ( 18°58′33″S 32°40′08″E )

At the city end Herbert Chitepo Street adopts the name Chimanimani Road.

- As A9, the road begins in Mutare and goes through Nyanyadzi, Birchnough Bridge, Nyika, Masvingo, Mashava, Zvishavane, Filabusi then Mbalabala where it joins the (A6) Bulawayo-Beit Bridge Highway near the 61.5 km peg.

=== P7/A9 Highway ===
Turns right at Masvingo to Mbalabala via Mashava. It also part of the national route called A9 that starts at Mutare and ends at Mbalabala via Masvingo. Mutare to Masvingo is primary road P4 while the Masvingo to Mbalabala part is primary road P7 but still A9 highway.

=== P5/A10 Highway ===
A10 branches east at Ngundu to Chiredzi through to Tanganda.

A10 Ngundu-Triangle-Chiredzi-Chisumbanje-Chimanimani Road

=== R8 Highway ===
R branches east at Rutanga to Sango via Mbizi

== See also ==
- Trans-African Highway network
- R3/A1 Highway
- R2/A5 Highway
- Chirundu-Beitbridge Regional Road Corridor
