= A10 road (Zimbabwe) =

Road in Zimbabwe

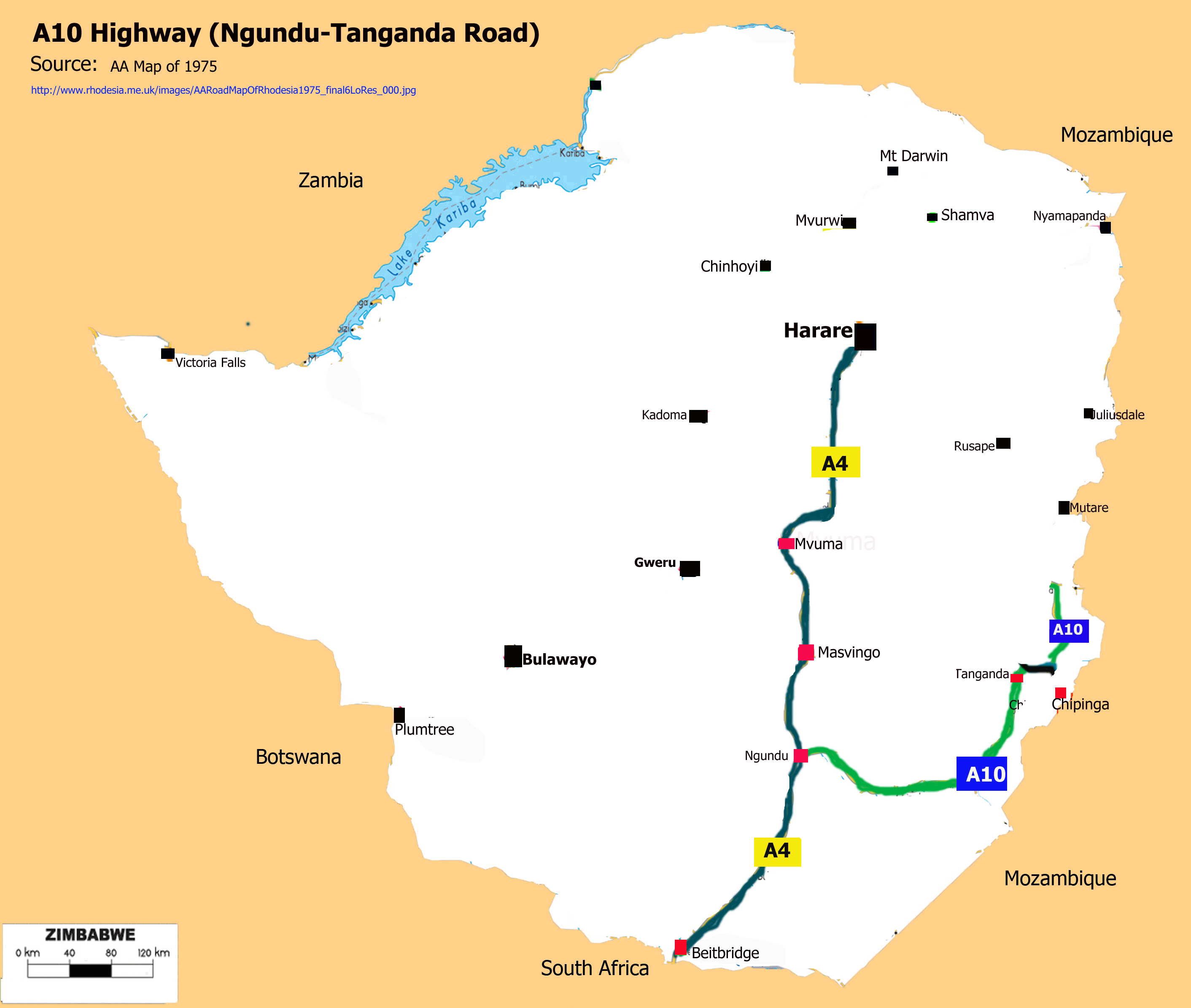

Route information
- Length: 247 mi (398 km)

Location
- Country: Zimbabwe
- Provinces: Masvingo, Manicaland
- Towns: Ngundu, Triangle, Chiredzi, Tanganda Halt, Mutambara, Nhedziwa, Wengezi

Highway system
- Transport in Zimbabwe

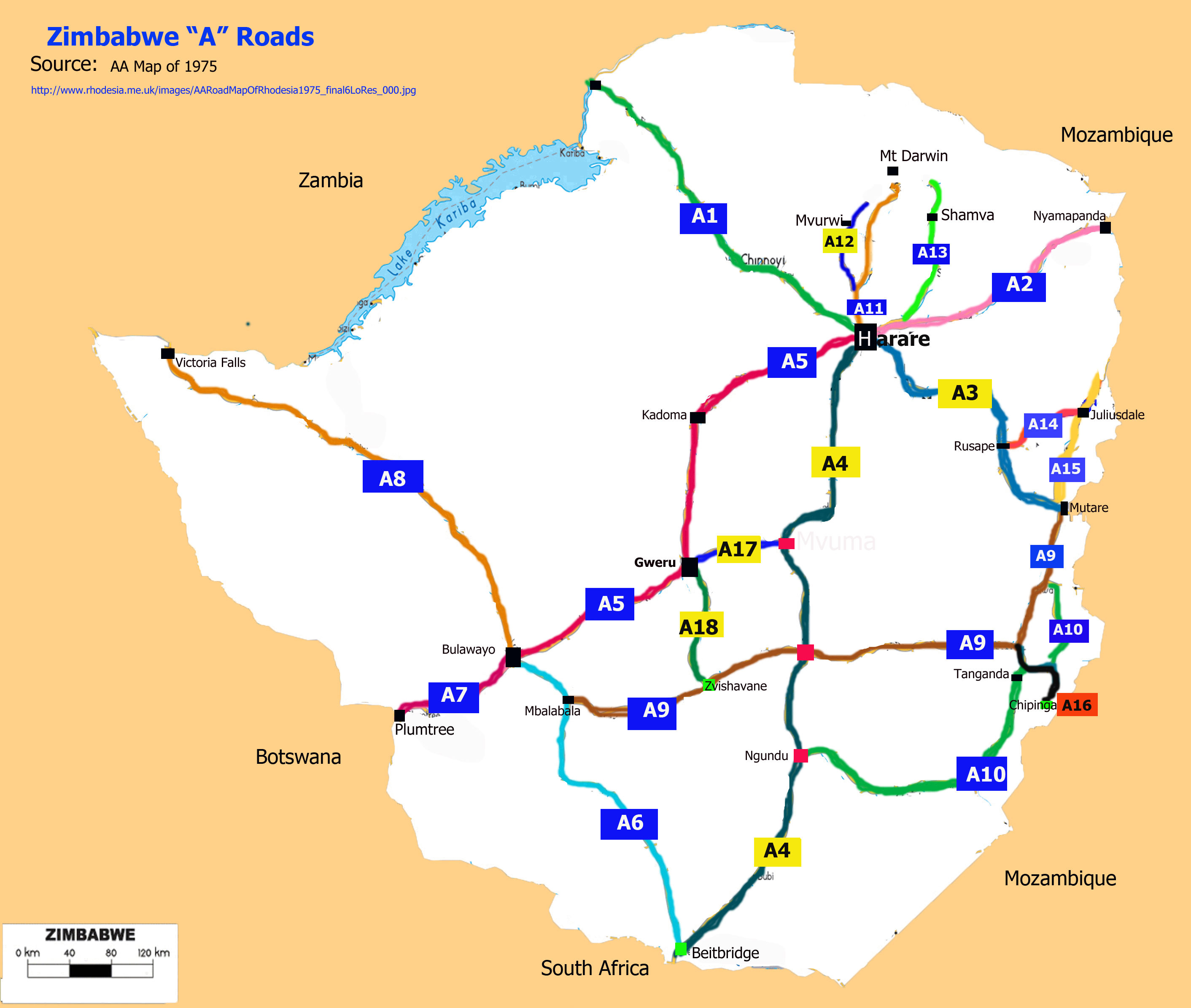
Zimbabwe "A" classified roads as of 1975

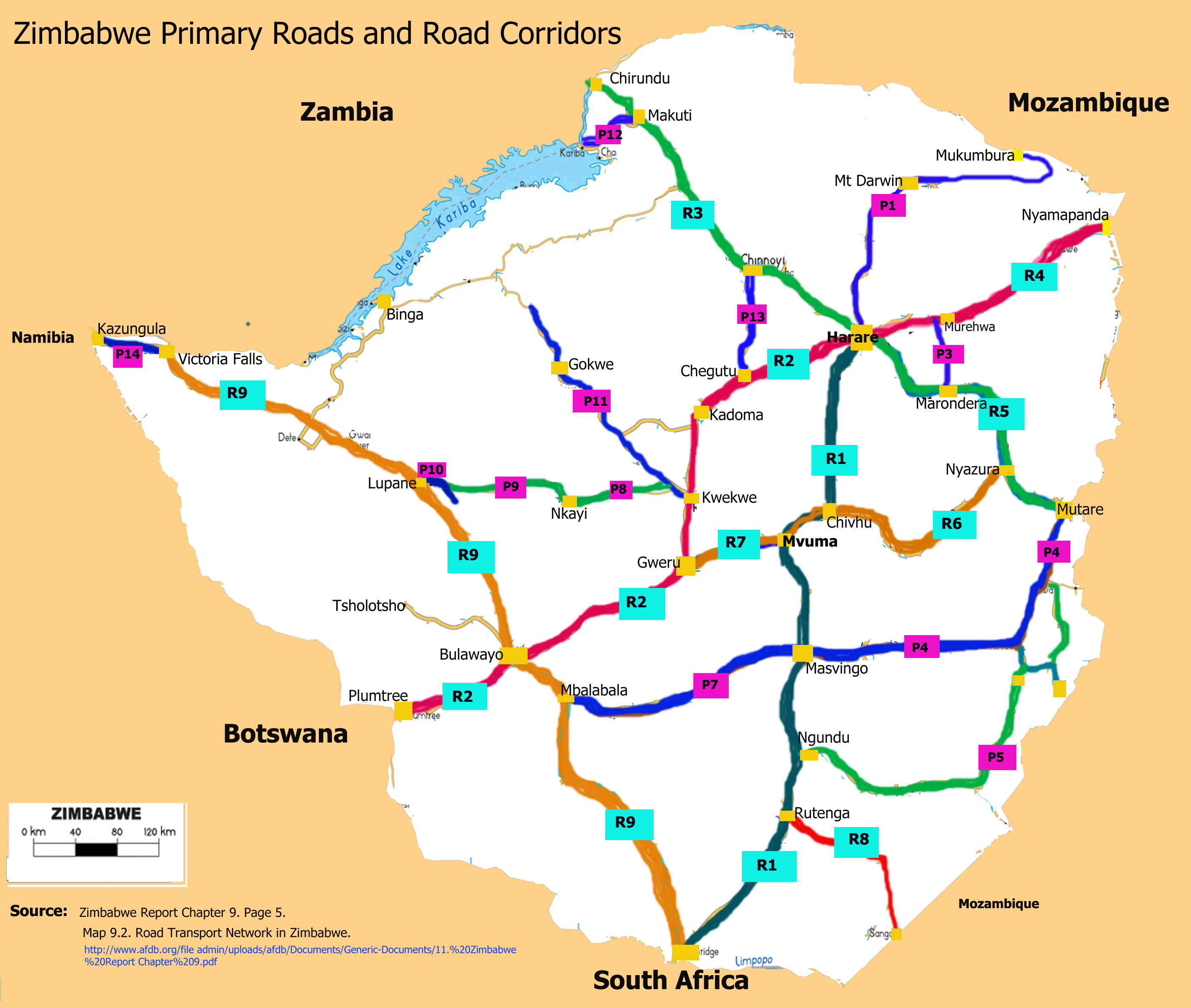
Zimbabwe Primary Roads

The A10 Highway is a primary road that runs from Ngundu in south Masvingo Province to Tanganda ending at Wengezi turn-off, through the Mutare-Masvingo Highway in Manicaland Province.

== Background ==
The A10 Highway also called the P5 Highway begins at where Cashel/Chimanimani Road turns off from the A9 Highway which runs from Mutare to Masvingo19°30′22″S 32°31′51″E. It ends at Ngundu in Masvingo Province where it makes a T-junction with the A4 Highway running from Harare to Beitbridge. 20°47′41″S 30°48′01″E

Locals in Manicaland like to call it Chimanimani Road and after Chimanimani Turn off they call it Tanganda Road and further on they call it Chiredzi Road. Those around Ngundu call it Chiredzi Road and past Chiredzi turn-off they call it Save Road, Tanganda Road and finally Mutare Road.

== Junctions ==
(Direction: North to South.)

Province	Location	Destinations	Notes
Manicaland Province	Wengezi turn-off	A9 Highway	Road starts at a T junction with the A9 Highway. 19°30′22″S 32°31′51″E
Manicaland Province	Cashel Road junction	Cashel Road – Cashel	Cashel Road continues straight ahead; A10 turns right. 19°31′51″S 32°38′45″E
Manicaland Province	Chimanimani Turn-off	Chimanimani Road – Chimanimani	Chimanimani Road turns left. 19°52′55″S 32°44′19″E
Manicaland Province	Chipinga Turn-off	A16 Highway – Chipinga	A10 turns right to merge with the A16 Highway; road straight ahead continues to Chipinga. 20°05′14″S 32°38′49″E
Manicaland Province	Tanganda Turn-off	A16 Highway – Birchenough Bridge; A9 Highway	A10 turns sharp left from the merge with the A16 Highway; A16 continues straight for 22.3 km to the junction with the A9 Highway east of Birchenough Bridge. 20°06′56″S 32°27′04″E
Masvingo Province	Chiredzi	Inyati Drive – Chiredzi	Chiredzi Turn-off, 169 km from the A16 Tanganda Turn-off; municipal Inyati Drive branches left and runs approximately 3 km into Chiredzi.

== Major Bridges ==
- Save River. 20°59′56″S 32°09′29″E
- Mutirikwi River. 21°02′32″S 31°23′26″E
- Chiredzi River. 21°00′44″S 31°44′54″E

== Toll Gates ==
The road is tolled at Toll Plaza number "35" between the 70.5-71.5 km peg, 9 km before Triangle.

== See also ==
- A4 Highway
- A9 Highway
- A16 Highway
- ZINARA
- Transport in Zimbabwe
