= R7 road (Zimbabwe) =

Highway in Zimbabwe

Location
- Country: Zimbabwe

Highway system
- Transport in Zimbabwe

R7 Highway is a primary, paved, regional road corridor in central Zimbabwe virtue of linking the regional corridors R1 Highways that runs from Harare to Beitbridge via Masvingo, and R2 Highway that runs from Harare to Plumtree via Bulawayo.

== Background ==
R7 Highway is also the national road called A17 Highway which runs from Gweru to Mvuma. It begins at the roundabout in the city of Gweru where is extends from Main street. 19°27′18″S 29°49′25″E and ends in Mvuma at the junction with the R1 Highways. 19°17′52″S 30°32′02″E

=== Rural road ===
The Gweru-Mvuma Road was a rural road which was upgraded into a national highway and road corridor in 1989. It was then known as Road R51-7. It was upraised at the same time with the R84-7 Highway after rehabilitation and pavement by the then Ministry of Transport and Energy, Construction Units Nº 7. Construction work commenced 15 January 1986 though it had been scheduled to begin on 1 October 1985. The main job was completed on 15 August 1988 though the scheduled date of completion had been 1 October 1987. (Duration of contract 24 months 31 months) Final touches and maintenance work ended on 15 August 1989, the scheduled date having been 1 October 1988.

== Operations ==
From a rural road the Road R51-7 became a national highway because after completion this Mvuma- Gweru Highway attracted long-distance traffic and traffic volumes substantially increased with average growth rates higher than 7%.

Presently it is a regional road corridor link road connecting the R1 Highway which runs from Harare to Beitbridge and the R2 Highway that runs from Harare to Plumtree. Together with R6 Highway which runs from Chivhu to Nyazura connecting the R1 Highway with the R5 Highway that runs from Harare to Mutare, makes a short cut road corridor from Mutare to Gweru and Bulawayo.

== Road user charges ==
Like all road corridors in Zimbabwe, the R7 Highway is not a toll free road. There is a Toll Gate at a Toll Plaza at Sino Turn off, 37 km from Gweru where ZINARA collects toll fees and overload charges. This is Toll Gate number 15 of the 36 self reliant Toll Plazas in Zimbabwe. (Location) 19°47′30″S 30°43′57″E

== See also ==
- R1 Highways
- Chirundu-Beitbridge Regional Road Corridor
- R6
- ZINARA
- Transport in Zimbabwe
- Chivhu
