= A8 road (Zimbabwe) =

Road in Zimbabwe

Location
- Country: Zimbabwe

Highway system
- Transport in Zimbabwe

The A8 Highway is a paved primary trunk road in Zimbabwe running from Bulawayo to Victoria Falls. It is managed by the Zimbabwe National Roads Administration (ZINARA). It is part of the R9 Route, which links Victoria Falls with Beitbridge.

== Background ==
The A8 Highway is part of Zimbabwe's regional road corridor number R9 which runs from the border with Zambia to the border with South Africa. It is also part of Trans-African Highway Network no. 4 (Cairo-Cape Town Highway), which is a route designated to connect Cairo and Cape Town.

Quick Road Data Table in reference to Regional Trunk Roads Network (RTRN).

RTRN No:	Road Section No:	Map Section No:	Origin	Destination	Length kilometres	Length miles	Surface
SADC 15	708	A8	Bulawayo	Victoria Falls	440 km	273.4 miles	paved

== Operations ==
A8 is part of the Trans-African Highway 4 which is runs from Cairo through Gaborone to Cape Town. The TAH 4 is 8.861 kilometers long and the A8 covers only 440 km which is only about 5% of the trans-national road corridor. However together with the A7 Highway that runs 110 km from Bulawayo to Plumtree Border Post the Zimbabwean length of the TAH 4 becomes 550 km, which is about 6% of the total trans-national corridor.

== Junctions ==
As shown on the Automobile Association 1973 Map.

=== Lupane Road ===
From Bulawayo the first major junction is at Lupane Turn-off 176 km away. (18°56′09″S 27°45′52″E ) This right turn is the P10 Road to Lupane Centre. This is the shortest trunk road in the system, only about 5 km long. The P10 Road after Lupane it connects with the P9 Highway.

( 18°56′05″S 27°48′33″E ) The P9 Highway runs from here to Nkayi where it continues as P8 Highway to Kwekwe via Silobela. This is the shortest route from Victoria Falls to Harare.

=== Halfway House ===
About 51 km from Lupane Turn-off is Halfway House, 230 km from Bulawayo and 210 km before Victoria Falls. ( 18°43′47″S 27°22′15″E )

=== Lubimbi Turn-off ===
24 km from Halfway House is Lubimbi Turn Off to the right. This road eventually reaches Magunje and the A1 Highway to Chirundu. A 4x4 truck is recommended for this route.

=== Dete-Kamativi Crossroads ===
About 59 km from Halfway House is the Dete-Kamativi crossroads. The left lead is the Dete Road 17 km to Dete and the right is Kamativi Road to Kamativi Mine 29 km away. About 25 km on this road is the Binga Turn-off signposted. From this point Binga is about 155 km away.

=== Hwange ===
Hwange is 105 km from Halfway House, 335 km from Bulawayo and 105 km before Victoria Falls. ( 18°20′49″S 26°30′14″E ) In this town are Hwange Colliery Mine and Hwange Thermal Power Station.

=== Kazungula Road ===
Victoria Falls is 105 km from Hwange and about 3 km from the border with Zambia where the A8 Highway ends. The P14 Highway to Kazungula runs west for 69 km to the Border Post with Botswana and Namibia. At Kazungula transit vehicles from Botswana and Namibia into Zambia are transported by a bridge across the Zambezi River.

== Bridges ==
There are a number of high level bridges on the A8 Highway and these are a few major ones on the following rivers.

(Direction is from Bulawayo to Victoria Falls)

• Umguza River • Insuza River • Bubi River • Lupane River • Shabula River • Gwayi River • Ilambo River • Kapami River • Inyantwe River • Bongora River • Lukozi River • Deka River • Matetsi River

== Toll Plazas ==
The A8 is a road with tollgates at the following points.

Plaza number	Map Section Number	Trunk Road Number	Common name	Toll Plaza	Location	Nearest Center
17	A8	R9	Victoria Falls Highway	Cindêrella	18°20′33″S 26°22′02″E	6 km from Hwange
18	A8	R9	Victoria Falls Highway	Umguza Turn Off	20°00′46″S 28°32′26″E	18 km from Bulawayo

== See also ==
- A7 Highway
- Transport in Zimbabwe
- ZINARA
