= R5 road (Zimbabwe) =

Road in Zimbabwe

Location
- Country: Zimbabwe

Highway system
- Transport in Zimbabwe

R5 Highway is a 270.8 kilometres (168.3 mi) regional road corridor running from Harare to Mutare. It is also known as the A3 Highway. It is part of the Beira–Lobito Highway.

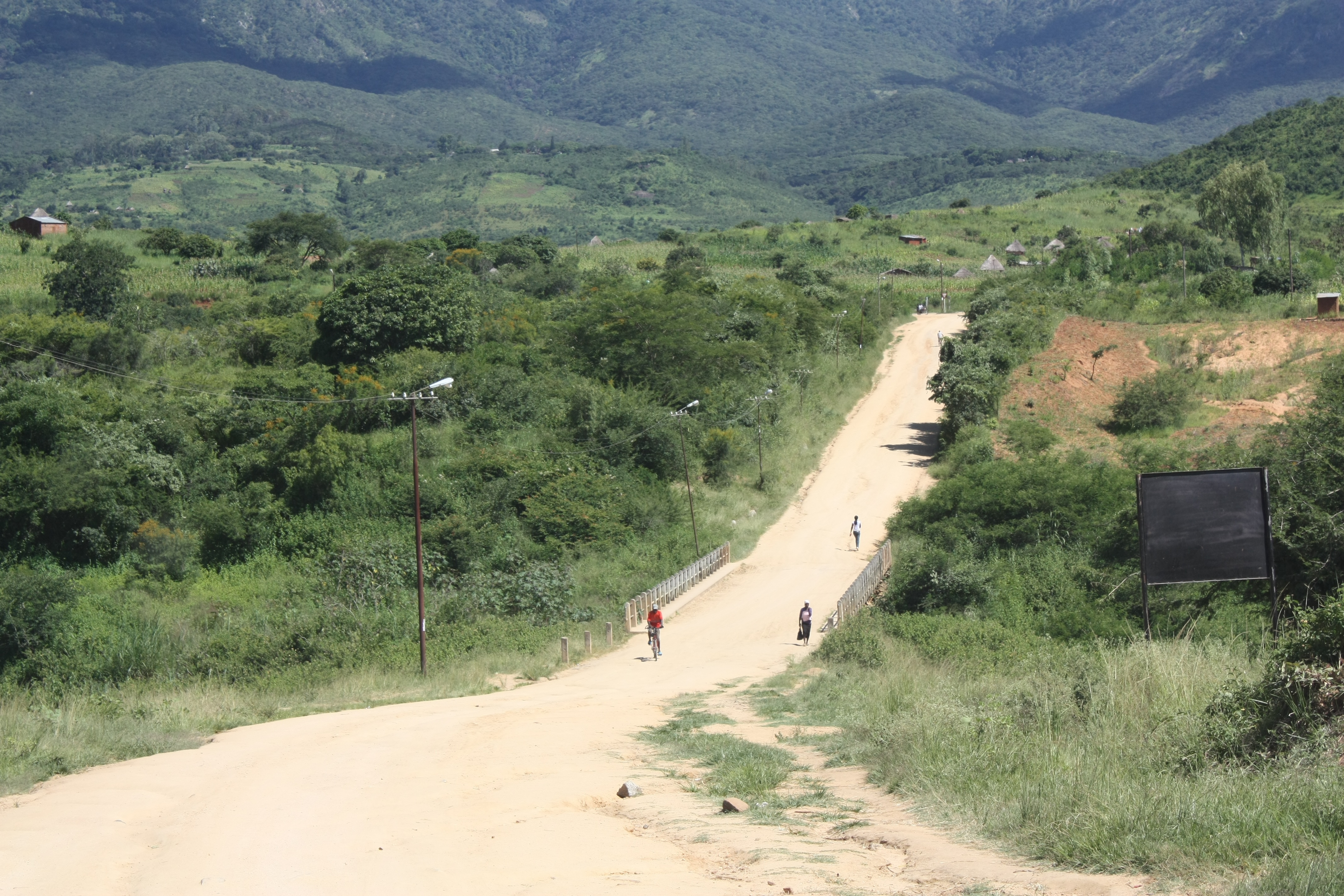
Close to Machipanda Border Post

== Background ==
In Harare the A3 Highway starts at Samora Machel Avenue (east), ( 17°50′37″S 31°07′57″E ) while the A5 Highway that runs from Harare to Bulawayo also begins at Samora Machel Avenue (west).

Those in and around Harare like to call it Mutare Road, while those in Mutare call it Harare Road. Together with the R2 Highway, it forms the Plumtree-Bulawayo-Harare-Mutare Highway.

== Operations ==
The R5 Highway links the Trans-African-Highway 9 to the Beira Corridor through the Machipanda Border Post east of Mutare. Together with the R3 it forms part of the Beira-Lobito Highway (the green route on this map)

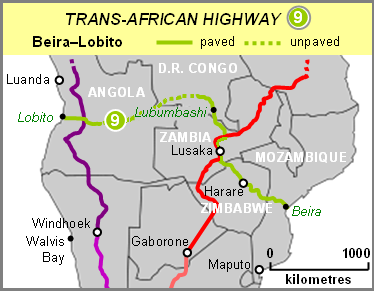

== Junctions ==
• At Marondera the P3 Highway turns left (north) to Murehwa. Its common name is the Marondera-Murehwa Road @ 18°11′17″S 31°32′44″E.

- At Rusape the A14 Highway branches left (north) to Juliasdale and Nyanga @ 18°32′01″S 32°07′26″E.

• At Nyazura the R6 Highway turns right (south) to Chivhu. Its common name is the Chivhu-Nyazura Road. 18°42′46″S 31°10′22″E

- Just 10 kilometres (6.2 mi) before Mutare, the highway A15 branches right (north) to Juliasdale and through to Nyanga and the Eastern Highlands.

SOURCE: AA MAP

== Waypoints ==
Major waypoints are

- Marondera
- Rusape

== See also ==
- Plumtree-Bulawayo-Harare-Mutare Highway
- Transport in Zimbabwe
- A9 Highway
