= A9 road (Zimbabwe) =

Road in Zimbabwe

Location
- Country: Zimbabwe

Highway system
- Transport in Zimbabwe

The A9 Road is a national highway in Zimbabwe running from Mutare to Mbalabala. The road begins in Mutare (18°59′01″S 32°39′36″E) and runs south-west through Nyanyadzi, Birchenough Bridge, Masvingo, Mashava, Zvishavane, Filabusi and ends at Mbalabala where it joins the (A6) Bulawayo-Beit Bridge Highway near the 61.5 km peg. (20°26′38″S 29°02′28″E) The 513 kilometres (319 mi) highway is about a 6 hours 15 minute drive.

== Background ==
A9 Highway is an inter-city and an inter-district primary road divided into two link roads namely P4 (Masvingo-Mutare Highway) and P7 (Masvingo-Mbalabala Highway) to suite the trunk road linking system.

== Operations ==
The A9 Highway is the shortest route from Botswana through the Plumtree Border Post to Mutare, and from south-western Zambia through the Victoria Falls Border Post but the greater part of the A9 Highway is not designated as the regional road corridor. The P4 part of this highway plays an important role in linking regional traffic from South Africa to Mutare and to parts of central-western Mozambique through the Beitbridge Border Post. P4 begins in Masvingo and runs north-east most of way through Birchenough Bridge and Nyanyadzi before linking with A3 Highway in Mutare.

The P7 part connects Masvingo with Mashava, Zvishavane, Filabusi. It ends at Mbalabala where it forms a T-junction with A6 to link with Gwanda, Esigodini and Bulawayo. At Zvishavane P7 intersects with A18 Highway that runs from Gweru to Zvishavane.

== Junctions ==
• The first major junction is from Mutare is Chimanimani turn-off where the A10 Highway branches left (east) to Chimanimani and Cashel. ( 19°30′22″S 32°31′51″E )

• The second junction is just three and half kilometres before Birchenough Bridge where A16 Highway to Chipinga branches left. (19°57′04″S 32°22′05″E )

• The third junction is in Masvingo where A9 Highway intersects with A4 Highway which runs from Harare to Beitbridge. ( 20°04′19″S 30°50′04″E )

• The fourth junction is at Zvishavane turn-off where it intersects with A18 Highway that runs from Gweru to Zvishavane. ( 20°18′51″S 30°03′09″E ) There are however smaller junctions all the way from Mutare to Mbalabala which plan a very important role in the trunk road system.

== Major Waypoints ==
• Birchenough Bridge ( 19°59′26″S 30°59′44″E ) Birchnough Bridge is one of those places tourist do not want to miss.

• Masvingo is the largest waypoint on this road. It is the capital city of Masvingo Province and home to the Great Zimbabwe ruins.

• Zvishavane is just off the road at the junction of this Masvingo-Mbalabala Highway and the Gweru-Zvishavane Highway.

• Filabusi

• Mbalabala though the end of the A9 Highway is not usually the destination of motorists using this road. So it will be another waypoint for those travelling to either Gwanda or Bulawayo.

== See also ==
• P4 Highway

• P7 Highway

• R1 Highway

• Chirundu-Beitbridge Highway

- ZINARA
