= Operation Yodel =

- Part of the Rhodesian Bush War (or Second Chimurenga)
- Operation Yodel (Zimbabwe)
Date	13 – 25 September 1966
Location	Chirundu, Rhodesia
Result	Rhodesian victory

Belligerents
Rhodesia	ZANLA (ZANU)

Commanders and leaders
(Rhodesia) Cap. Richard E.H. "Dick" Lockley (Rhodesia) Lt. Garth Barrett (Rhodesia) Lt. Trevor Desfountain	Unknown

Units involved
Rhodesian Army: RLI; BSAP	Unknown

Strength
Unknown	15 cadres

Casualties and losses
1 wounded	14 killed 1 captured

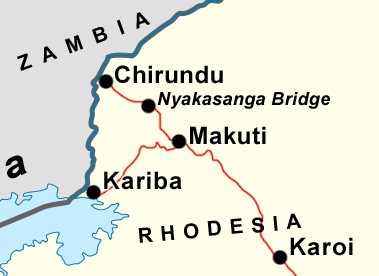
The RLI's "first proper contact"; Operation Yodel, September 1966

Operation Yodel was an operation launched by the Rhodesian Security Forces on 13 September 1966 in response to an attack on civilians executed by communist insurgents who crossed over the border from Zambia into Rhodesia.
