= A6 road (Zimbabwe) =

Road in Zimbabwe

Coordinates: 21.7164°S 29.8627°E

Location
- Country: Zimbabwe

Highway system
- Transport in Zimbabwe

The A6 is a highway in Zimbabwe running from the Beitbridge border with South Africa, through Gwanda, to Bulawayo. It is part of the R9 Route, which links Beitbridge with Victoria Falls.

The A6 Highway runs from Bulawayo through Esigodini, Mulungwane, Mbalabala, Gwanda, West Nicholson, Makado, Mazunga to Beitbridge.

== Junctions ==
There is one major junction. The A9 Road (Zimbabwe) to Mutare via Masvingo branches east at Mbalabala just past the 61 km peg (61.3 km). (71 km from Bulawayo city centre)

== See also ==
- Trans-African Highway network
- R2 Highway
- R1 Highway
- A8 Highway
