= A5 road (Zimbabwe) =

Road in Zimbabwe

Location
- Country: Zimbabwe

Highway system
- Transport in Zimbabwe

The A5 Highway is a national road in Zimbabwe. It joins the cities of Harare and Bulawayo, and is hence known as the Harare-Bulawayo Highway. It is one of the two routes that form the R2 Route, which connects Harare with the Plumtree Border with Botswana.

It has a total length of approximately 439 kilometres (273 mi).

In Harare the Highways begins as an extension of Samora Machel Avenue (west). You can pick it from Harare Show Grounds roundabout. 17°49′46″S 31°01′59″E However the A5 begins at the right T-Junction with Mutley Bend (road) where Samora Machel Avenue ends. This is at the parkade popularly called China City.

In Bulawayo, A5 is called First Avenue at its intersection with Samuel Parirenyatwa Street. 20°08′49″S 28°35′31″E

== Road map ==
The road joins Harare-- Chegutu-- Kadoma-- Kwekwe -- Gweru and ends in Bulawayo

== Major waypoints ==
Stage	Logo	Settlement	Flag	Class	Province	Remarks
#01		Harare		city	Harare Province	National Capital
#02		Chegutu	-	town	Mashonaland West	
#03		Kadoma	-	city	Mashonaland West	
#04		Kwekwe	-	city	Midlands Province	
#05		Gweru		city	Midlands	Provincial Capital
#06		Bulawayo		city	Bulawayo Provincial	Capital. National second largest city.

== Distance table ==
Stage	Logo	Name	Harare	Chegutu	Kadoma	Kwekwe	Gweru	Bulawayo
#01		Harare	000	106	141	213	275	439
#02		Chegutu	106	000	35	107	169	333
#03		Kadoma	141	35	000	72	134	298
#04		Kwekwe	213	107	72	000	62	226
#05		Gweru	275	169	134	62	000	164
#06		Bulawayo	439	333	298	226	164	000

== Toll plazas ==
A5 Highway is not a toll-free road. There are 5 toll plazas on the highway.

Source: [Daily News zw.]

=== Plazas table ===
Table shows highway running from Harare to Bulawayo (Harare being the first stage and Bulawayo the last stage).

Toll Plaza	Back Stage	Nect Stage
Norton	Harare	Chegutu & Kadoma
*
Kadoma	Kadoma & Chegutu	Kwekwe
*
Gweru North	Kwekwe	Gweru
*
Treetops (Gweru South)	Gweru	Shangani
*
Ntabazinduna	Shangani	Bulawayo

=== Toll table ===
Vehicle Class	Toll (US$)
Motor Cycles	0
Light motor	4
Kombies	6
Minibuses	6
Buses	8
Heavy Motor	10

== Feeder roads ==
There are several national highways as well as secondary highways connecting the A5 to highways elsewhere. Here are a few important ones.

=== Ngezi-Selous Road ===
The 77-kilometre (47.85-mile) Ngezi-Selous Road popularly known as Platinum Highway is a 9-metre (9.84-yard) highway in Zimbabwe built for a platinum mining organization and public transport. It is best well kept road in Zimbabwe by all standards.

It branches left (south) at the Selous, popularly known as Halfway roundabout 75 km southwest of Harare and 31 km northeast of Chegutu. 18°04′46″S 30°25′39″E

Public Omnibuses are advised to use other roads because numerous abnormal load trucks use this road 24/7.

The road was originally a secondary gravel road until the mining company decided to upgrade it for business viability.

Having seen that on-site underground mining at the Zimplats’ Hartley Platinum Mine was no longer viable, management replaced it by a new open-cast operation at Ngezi Mine. The Ngezi-Selous sealed highway was then constructed at a cost of to US$17 million to link the Ngezi Platinum Group metals mine and the Selous Metallurgical Complex which are about 78 km apart.

The highway was the biggest and fastest road construction contract ever undertaken in Zimbabwe. Its construction began on 14 May 2001 and handed over to the Ministry of Transport on 29 November 2001 for commissioning.

=== Chegutu-Chinhoyi Road ===
Chegutu-Chinhoyi Road is a primary paved road officially called the P13 Highway or P13 Road. It makes a right hand (north) T-Junction with the A5 about 500 metres east of Chegutu CBD. 18°07′30″S 30°08′46″E

It runs northerly 92 km to Chinhoyi where it connects to A1 Highway.

When travelling to Kariba from any place around Kadoma, Kwekwe, Gweru, Zvishavane or even Bulawayo, this is the shortest and fastest link road.

Its main feeder road is the Murombedzi Road which branches to the right (east) at about 46.5 kilometres (28.9 mi) (by air). 17°42′29″S 30°10′44″E

The road passes through Msengezi Purchase Area, Zvimba Communal Land and Chitombarwizi Purchase Area before reaching Chinhoyi.

Major bridges on this road across the Mupfure River, Msengezi river on the border of Msengezi Purchase Area with Zvimba Communal Land. Muswakadzi River at the beginning of Chitomborwiri Purchase Area.

=== Gokwe-Empress Road ===
This is the shortest link route from Harare to Gokwe through to Binga. However the road has numerous potholes especially on the section after Munyati River Bridge to Sidakeni Shopping Center.

In rainy seasons the Munyati River Bridge on this road may be flooded.

=== Kwekwe-Gokwe Road ===
This road branches to the right (west) about 3 kilometres (1.9 mi) north of Kwekwe. After Gokwe this road eventually takes you to Binga.

=== Gweru roads ===
There are several roads that connect with A5 in the City of Gweru that include:

- A17 Highway also called Mvuma Road.
- A18 Highway also called Shurugwi Road.
- There is also the Lower Gweru Road that feeds the Lower Gweru areas through to Silobela.

== River bridges ==
Source map: [AA Road Map 1985]

The A5Highway passes across a few major rivers along its route.

Stage	River	Nearest Settlement	Nearest City	Province	Alias	Location	
1	Manyame River	Norton	Harare	Mashonaland West	Hunyani River	18°00′14″S 31°14′43″E	
2	Mupfure River	Chegutu	Kadoma	Mashonaland West	Umfuli River	18°07′11″S 30°13′35″E	
3	Muzvezve River	Kadoma	Kadoma	Mashonaland West	Umzwezwe River	18°26′28″S 29°49′44″E	
4	Munyati River	Munyati	Kwekwe	Mashonaland West	Sanyati River, Umniati River	18°40′37″S 29°48′24″E	
5	Sebakwe River	Kwekwe	Kwekwe	Midlands	Zibagwe River	18°51′04″S 29°48′09″E	
6	Kwekwe River	Redcliff	Kwekwe	Midlands	Que Que River	-	
7	Gweru River	Gweru	Gweru	Midlands	Gwelo River, Ikwelo River	-	
8	Vungu River	*	Gwru	Gweru	Midlands	*	-
9	Shangani River	Shangani	Gweru	Matabeleland North	uNhlangano	-	

== Challenges ==
=== Waypoint vendors and touts ===
The rate of unemployment in Zimbabwe is so high and the so-called self-help projects have multiplied, some of them a nuisance to motorists.

It is not only in the capital that touts are a problem. Waypoints are massed with vendors and pirate taxies touts who swarm any vehicle that stops by. They however are usually harmless but visitors might not be comfortable with them.

Motorists are advised to stop and park at designated parking places.

=== Illegal gold panners ===
The road is now under threat from mining activities because in some sections of the road illegal gold panning is so bad that the Environmental Management Agency (EMA) has engaged the Ministries of Mines and Mining Development and the Ministry of Home Affairs to assist in bringing sanity to the illegal mining operations along the highway, especially in the Kwekwe District. The area between Munyati River has seen the wrath of illegal miners and EMA fears the highway might be affected. The A5 Highway had its shoulders widened recently, an investment worth $206 million.

These illegal gold panners have been seen to operate from just one metre from the road shoulders yet mining laws allow mining activities to take place at least 25 metres from the shoulders of the road. Wide road shoulders might deter the illegal miners from coming to close to the highway from underground. In recent years right in the city of Kwekwe illegal gold miners dug and emerged from underneath a classroom at Globe and Phoenix Primary School.

Open pits have been left open in places not far from the highway, some of them about 15 metres. Should a disaster come on the road, there would not be any space to make a detour because of these pits. These "Makorokoza" as they are called have no respect for precious life on their part or on other people. They go as panning underneath the electricity pylons an act they did near Kwekwe Queens Sports Club, right in Kwekwe.
