= Alto Hama =

Coordinates: 12°14′S 15°33′E

- Commune
- Location in Angola
- Country: Angola
- Province: Huambo

Area
  - Total: 233 sq mi (604 km^{2})

Population (2014)
  - Total: 36,661
  - Density: 157/sq mi (60.7/km^{2})
- Time zone: UTC+1 (WAT)
- Climate: Aw

Alto Hama is a town, with a population of 17,000 (2014), and a commune of Angola, located in the province of Huambo.

Two trans-African automobile routes intersect in Alto Hama:

- Tripoli-Cape Town Highway
- Beira-Lobito Highway

== See also ==
- Communes of Angola
