= P12 road (Zimbabwe) =

Road in Zimbabwe

Route information
- Length: 77 km (48 mi)

Major junctions
- West end: M15 at the Kariba border with Zambia
- East end: A1 A1 in Makuti

Location
- Country: Zimbabwe

Highway system
- Transport in Zimbabwe

The P12 Makuti-Kariba Highway is a 2-way asphalt surface international highway from the A1 Highway at Makuti to Zambia via the Kariba Dam Wall. The maximum speed on this road is 120 kilometres (75 mi) per hour. It is part of Zimbabwean trunk road system.

== Background ==
The P12 road was constructed at the same time with the Kariba Dam as an access road between Zambia and Zimbabwe through the dam wall.

== Operations ==
The Highway is tolled on either side of the dam wall. The Zimbabwe Revenue Authority and the Zambia Revenue Authority collects the tolls for using the dam wall but payable to the Zambezi River Authority.

Tourist to safari areas this side of the Kariba Dam use the P12 from Makuti. Those interested in marine life also use this highway to harbours at Kaeiba.

== See also ==
- R3/A1 Highway
- Chirundu-Beitbridge Regional Road Corridor
- Transport in Zimbabwe
