= Lupane District =

Coordinates: 18°56′S 27°46′E

- administrative district
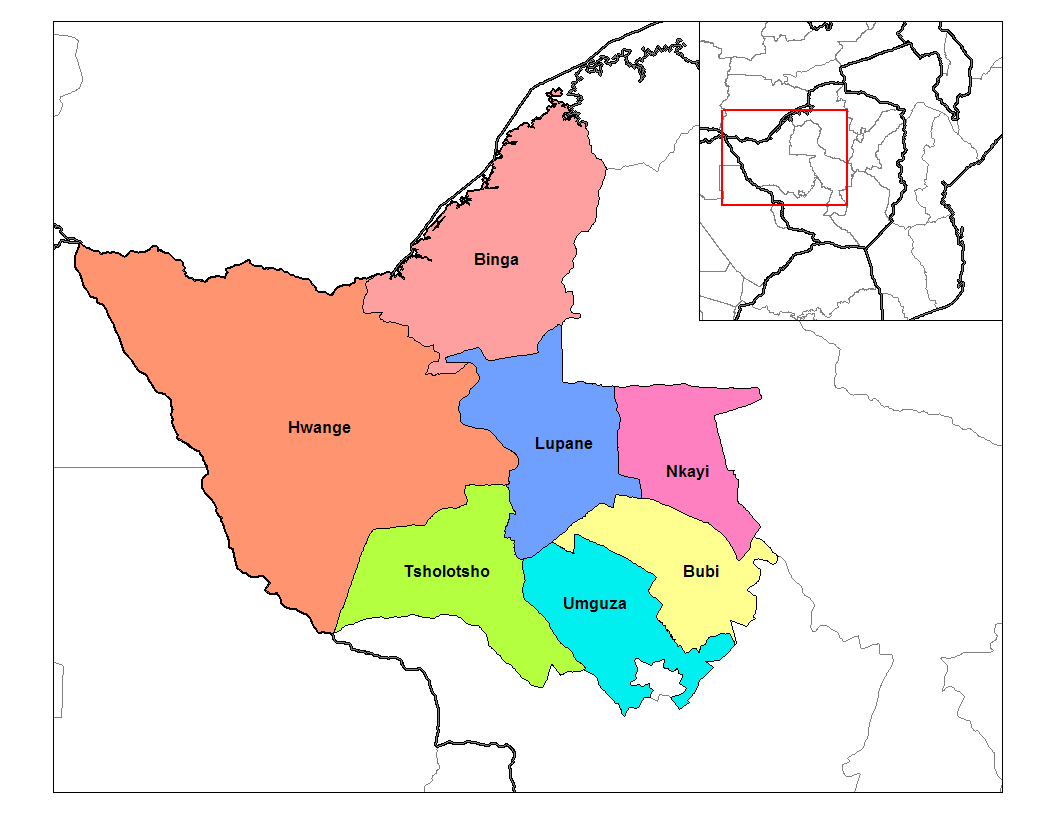
- Lupane District in Matabeleland North
- Country: Zimbabwe
- Province: Matabeleland North

Population (2022)
  - Total: 107,248
- Time zone: UTC+2 (CAT)

Lupane ( luːpɑːnɛ) District is located in the Matabeleland North Province of Zimbabwe, and it is also the Provincial Capital. The District is situated at an elevation of 976 m with a population of 107,000 inhabitants by 2022. Lupane Town is the main center of the district located 172 km from Bulawayo along the A8 Victoria Falls Road. The Government Provincial Administrative offices are located at the Town Centre. A new university near the Town has been established under the name Lupane State University, which caters for the region and beyond. The word Lupane is thought to be a Kalanga or Lozwi word.

== Geography ==
Lupane is a rural semi-arid area with a growing population and some infrastructural expansion due to status of being accorded the capital of the province under government devolution. The area falls under Savannah climate with four seasons, the altitude rainfall patterns favours woodlands and grasslands depending on the location in the country.

=== Climate ===
Rains in the Lupane District are generally low, but peak in summertime driven by the ITCZ and winter periods are dry. The summer time is hot with daily temperatures reaching a maximum of 40 °C, whilst winters are mild reaching daily minimum temperatures below 10 °C.

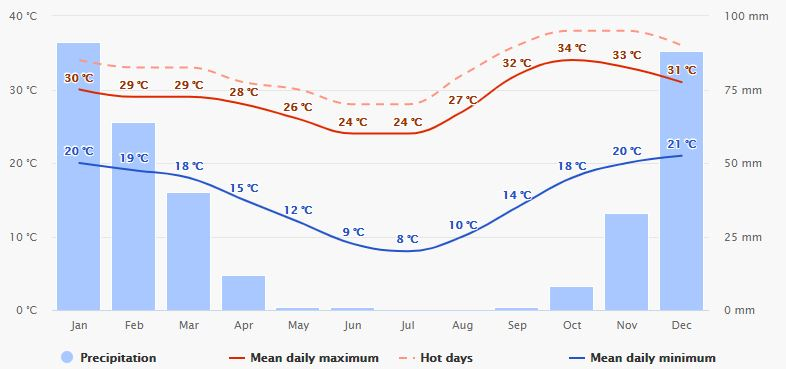
Lupane rainfail and temperature graph

=== Topography ===
Lupane Town is located on the flatlands of Matabeleland North province, as evidenced by straight railway line passing through the western side from Nyamandlovu to Dete. There are three big rivers passing through Lupane district, Gwayi river is on the western side and Shangani river is on the eastern side, both flow northwards and merge at Gwai Shangani Dam northwards towards Zambezi river. The third river passing through Lupane Town, Bubi river a feeder river to Lupane Dam situated next to Lupane State University.

=== Crop Farming ===
Lupane community practice subsistence farming and rely on seasonal rainfall for watering crops. Irrigation is utilised in some areas particularly ARDA Estate in Jotsholo drawing water from nearby Shangani River Dam. Tshongogwe area practice irrigation crop farming and supplies produce to Jotsholo and Lupane. Crops cultivated include millet, sorghum, sugar cane, cotton and corn or maize and vegetables.

=== Animal Husbandry ===
Small scale farming in Lupane and villages in the area own cattle as a symbol for wealth, for transport and crop farming using animal drawn ploughs. Cattle also provide milk used to supplement food and for re-sale as a source of income. Goat and sheep farming are practised to provide sources of food. Poultry farming is more into the chicken and to some extent, few small scale farmers breed turkey, goose, ducks and pigeons. Cattle and on rare occasions other livestock find their way into the nearest town, Bulawayo, for selling.

However most villages in Lupane are affected by wild animals like lions leopards hyenas to mention a few these comes from game parks around and they kill and eat the live stock

=== Vegetation ===
Lupane is home to indigenous hardwoods harvested and used around the country and exports.

=== Mining ===
The region has been explored for Coal Bed Methane (CBM) and a resource of over 370,000,000 cubic kilometres (13,000,000×10^{12} cu ft) is thought to exist with a purity of 95% methane. Lupane town is the main centre for the district and is the location of the Matebeleland North government head offices.

=== Tourism ===
Tourist passing through the Lupane Town may be in transit from Bulawayo to Victoria Falls and Hwange or vice versa. Marketing of area may need to be spruced up to harness tourism in the Lupane Town. Recently built dam and farming activities can be used to attract tourism. There are heritage sites that are probably not harnessed to attract tourist, the area where Lobengula disappeared.

== History ==
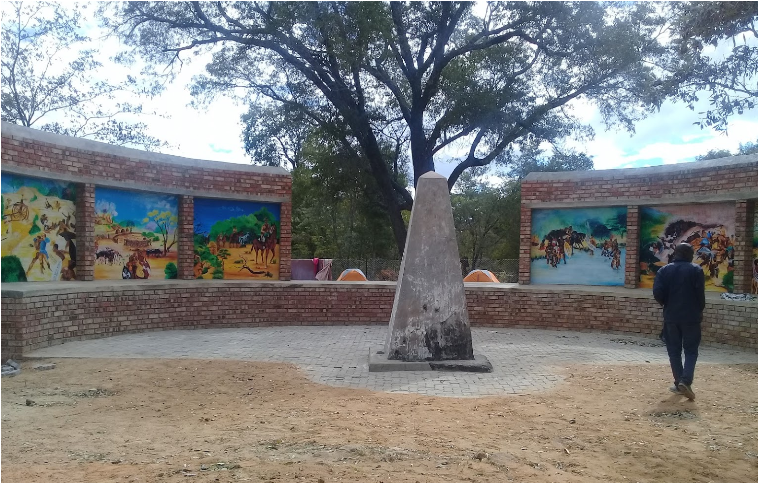
Pupu Shangani Memorial Site in Lupane

Although Lupane history has not been properly documented, the area is thought to have been occupied by the Tonga people who were pushed further up Northwards to present day Binga District by the arrival of King Mzilikazi during the establishment of the Ndebele Kingdom in Matabeleland. To this present day, the area is predominantly Ndebele speaking people, who were also ruled by King Lobengula after taking over from Mzilikazi. Two of Lobengula's counsellors, Magwegwe Fuyana and Mhlanga were buried in Lupane, Pupu area near Shangani River. Magwegwe Fuyane was the last of Lobengula's Kingdom equivalent to a Prime Minister by modern-day political language, Mhlanga was an aid de camp. Lupane residents participated in the Liberation War that lead to Zimbabwe Independence, April 1980, from white minority rule through the Political Party ZAPU of ZIPRA Liberation Armed Forces wing from 1960s. The area being a stronghold of ZAPU was not spared from Gukurahundi disturbances that occurred in the Matabeleland and Midlands areas in mid 1980s. In the 2000s, there have been cases of clashes of ever changing political stronghold landscape of MDC, with ZANU-PF. The Lupane State University was built in 2005, a notable feature to the modern history of Lupane together with the Bubi-Lupane Dam in 2010 on the Bubi River to supply water to Lupane District. A water treatment plant is also being built.

== Education ==
Lupane is home to Lupane State University, located within the vicinity of the town along the A8, the Victoria Falls road. Fatima High School has been in a long time offering Advanced Level, the government in recent times established Advanced Level in Secondary schools to improve tertiary education enrolment within the region and beyond. The notable Secondary schools to benefit were Mabhikwa, Sibambene, Amandlethu and Zwangendaba High Schools.

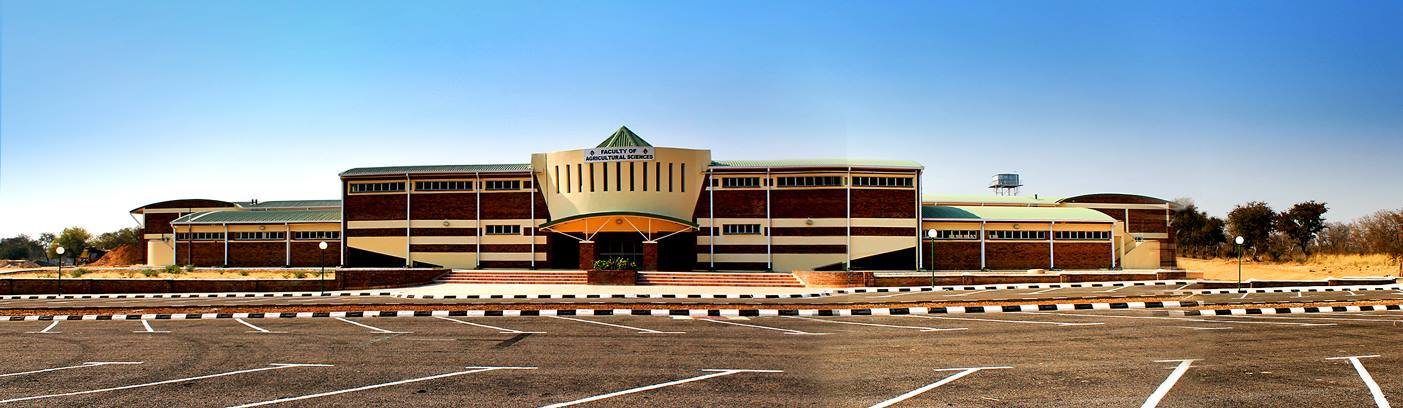
Lupane State University, Agriculture Faculty Building

Some schools within the vicinity regions have also utilised the establishment of Advanced Level facilities that may be seen as a benefit to improved enrolment at Lupane State University. Regina Mundi Mission Secondary School located at Gwayi Siding train station has been rated one of the best schools in producing Ordinary Level graduates. There are 29 Secondary Schools in Lupane offering ZIMSEC Ordinary Level School leaving certificates. The pass rate is seen as being lower due to the rural location of schools offering challenges to learners who travel longer distances and the under equipment of schools. There are 105 primary schools scattered around Lupane district, offering ZIMSEC Grade 7 Examinations, entrance to Form 1 at secondary schools. The issue of non-Ndebele Teachers teaching at Primary Schools, predominantly Lupane being a Ndebele speaking region has been a subject of discussion by scholars citing contributory factor to poor performance.

== Infrastructure ==
=== Road networks ===
The central location of Lupane in the Matabeleland North Province played to the advantage of being the choice of a Provincial Capital. The road networks mainly managed by ZINARA and Kusile Rural District Council through District Development Fund (DDF), is the main mode of transport for people and goods, as the area has no sea or rail system within the vicinity of its town. The main road passing through Lupane Town is the A8, popularly called the Victoria Falls road, connecting Umguza District from Bulawayo Province side to Hwange District and Victoria Falls, a gateway to the neighbouring country Zambia. Other roads are yet to be tarred an indication of underdevelopment of the district. Tsholotsho District is connected by the road passing through Sipepa and Nkayi District on the other side is connected via Fitting road. Local people in the rural areas utilise donkey or ox driven cart as a mode of transport for crop produce or accessing service centres. A small aerodrome is available in the town area for mainly high profiled people and politicians or investors who come to visit the area for game activities or mineral surveys.

=== Buildings ===
Most buildings in Lupane notably Government Complex, Hospital and the Registry Offices were constructed after Lupane was declared provincial capital to serve the Province the Lupane State University rounds up a series of new complexes. The Town is fast expanding with Kusile Rural District Council and Lupane Local Board of new homesteads, low middle and high density suburbs, catering for low middle and high income people.

=== Telecommunication ===
Lupane has three mobile network communication receptions for Econet, Net*One and Telecel, and the TelOne offers landline connections. The reception in the Town area is very good, but this dwindles as remote areas are approached. The cost of using a cellphone is high for poor people in the area and many cannot afford, however, this has been a great opportunity for many who receive calls from diaspora friends and families who provide remittances back home. all networks offer data and provide data based messaging WhatsApp which is affordable by many albeit the higher cost of smartphones that one has to overcome.

== Demographics ==
The Table below shows a summary of Lupane population up to last census, year 2012, the growth rate from previous census was low due to migration. The area is not highly developed and with fewer opportunities available, people move to other urban areas mainly Bulawayo, and neighboring countries such as South Africa and Botswana.

		Census	Census	
		18/08/2002	17/08/2012	
Lupane	District	98,668	100,161	
Zimbabwe	Republic	11,631,657	13,061,239	
Age Distribution (C 2012)			Gender (C 2012)	
0–9 years	32,003		Males	47,809
10–19 years	27,797		Females	52,352
20–29 years	12,066			
30–39 years	8,530		Urbanization (C 2012)	
40–49 years	5,936		Rural	97,950
50–59 years	5,542		Urban	2,211
60–69 years	3,955			
70+ years	4,095			

== Notable people ==
Cont Mhlanga – Founder of AmaKhosi Theatre in Bulawayo and a Zimbabwean playwright, actor and theatre director

Mthuli Ncube – Zimbabwe Minister of Finance

Solwayo Ngwenya – Chief executive officer of Mpilo Central Hospital
