= R6 road (Zimbabwe) =

Road in Zimbabwe

Location
- Country: Zimbabwe

Highway system
- Transport in Zimbabwe

The R6 Highway is a primary road, a trunk road and regional road corridor link road in Zimbabwe.

== Background ==
The R6 begins in Chivhu at the junction with the R1 Highway which runs from Harare to Masvingo. 19°01′11″S 30°53′51″E It ends in Nyazura at the junction with A3 Harare-Mutare Highway. (18°42′46″S 32°10′22″E)

It is also known as Buhere Road because the main waypoint and halfway house is Buhera.

[Source Map: Chapter 9: Road Transport Services and Infrastructure -African: Map 9.2. Road Transport Network of Zimbabwe]

== Operations ==
This road is the R1 link road to the R5 for traffic from Gweru to Mutare. It works in conjunction with the R7/A17 53 km from Chivhu towards Masvingo which links the R1/A4 with the R2/A5 for traffic from Mutare to Gweru.

It is tolled at Magamba Toll Plaza 17.5 km from Chivhu.

== See also ==
- ZINARA
- Transport in Zimbabwe
- R5 Highway
- R1 Highway
