= Beira–Lobito Highway =

Road in Africa

Trans-African Highway 9

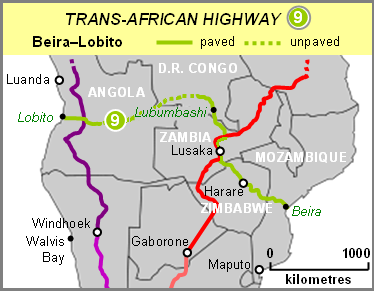

Route information
- Length: 3,523 km (2,189 mi)

Major junctions
- East end: Beira, Mozambique
- TAH 4 in Zambia; TAH 3 in Alto Hama, Angola
- West end: Lobito, Angola

Location

Highway system
- Transport in
| ← TAH 8 |

The Beira–Lobito Highway or TAH 9 is Trans-African Highway 9 in the transcontinental road network being developed by the United Nations Economic Commission for Africa (UNECA), the African Development Bank (ADB), and the African Union. The route has a length of 3,523 km (2,189 mi) crossing Angola, the most southerly part of the Democratic Republic of the Congo, Zambia, Zimbabwe, and central Mozambique.

The route links mining areas of DR Congo, Zambia and Zimbabwe and agricultural production areas of Angola, Zambia and Zimbabwe to the Atlantic port of Lobito and Indian Ocean port of Beira. Civil wars in Angola, DR Congo, Zimbabwe and Mozambique have affected development of the highway in the past, most recently in DR Congo and Angola.

The route is also served by a rail link running parallel to it for much of its length except between Kafue and Harare, though it too has been damaged in wars and its western half, the Benguela Railway, temporarily stopped operations in 2001 before resuming in March 2018.

Between Kapiri Mposhi and Kafue in Zambia, the highway shares the route with the Cairo-Cape Town Highway.

When complete the highway will be the southernmost of the Trans-African network's east-west crossings of the continent.

== Route ==
The entire route from Lobito to Beira is 3523 kilometres.

=== Angola ===
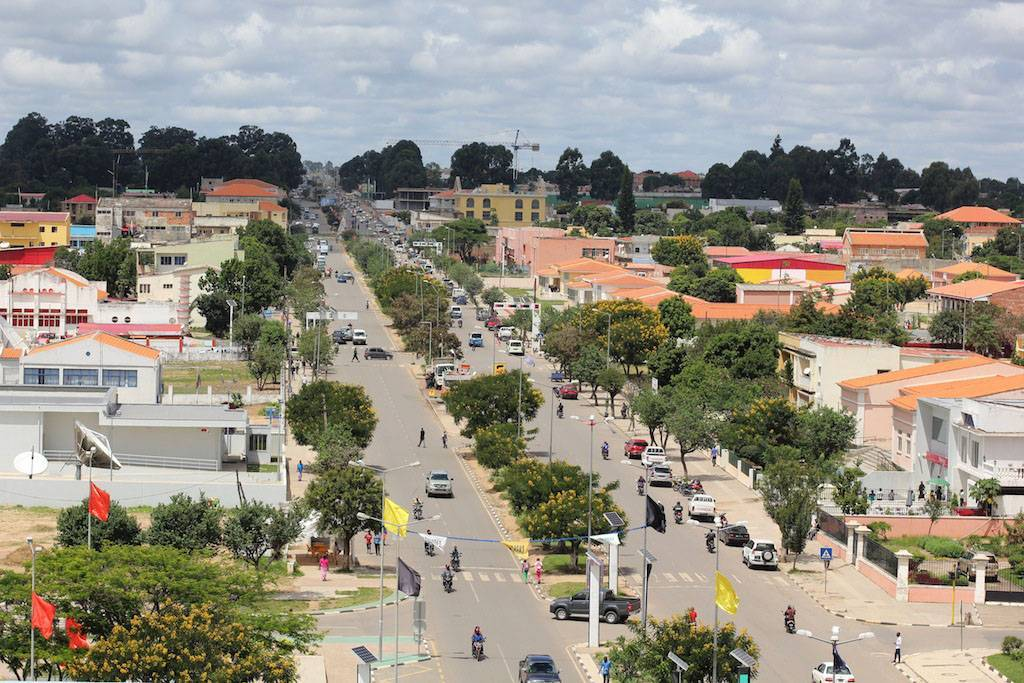
Cuíto

It starts in Lobito, Angola (north-east of Benguela), as part of the EN100 route. After a few kilometres north-east, it becomes the EN250 route eastwards. It is the EN250 route for the remainder of the Angolan section, through Cuíto, to Luau, Moxico Province, where it crosses the Kasai River Borderline into the Democratic Republic of the Congo (DR Congo) and the town of Dilolo. At the junction with the EN120 in the town of Alto Hama, the Beira–Lobito Highway intersects with the Tripoli-Cape Town Highway (Trans-African Highway 3). The Angolan section is 1160 kilometres.

=== DR Congo ===
From Dilolo, it goes eastwards as the N39 route, through Kolwezi, to the town of Guba (north of Likasi), where it becomes part of the N1 route south-eastwards. It is the N1 route for the remainder of the DR Congo section, through Likasi and Lubumbashi, to the border town of Kasumbalesa (DR Congo) in the Copperbelt Region, where it crosses the near borderline into the Republic of Zambia and the border town of Kasumbalesa (Zambia). The DR Congo section is 830 kilometres.

=== Zambia ===
From Kasumbalesa, it goes southwards as the T3 route, through Chingola, Kitwe and Ndola to exit the Copperbelt Region and reach the town of Kapiri Mposhi, where it becomes part of the T2 route, Zambia's Great North Road. It is the T2 route for the remainder of the Zambian section, through Kabwe and Lusaka (Zambia's Capital City), to the border town of Chirundu (Zambia), where it crosses the Zambezi River as the Chirundu Bridge into the Republic of Zimbabwe and the border town of Chirundu (Zimbabwe). From Kapiri Mposhi to the T1 route junction after Kafue (50 kilometres south of Lusaka), the Beira–Lobito Highway shares its route with the Cairo-Cape Town Highway (Trans-African Highway 4). The Zambian section is 610 kilometres.

=== Zimbabwe ===
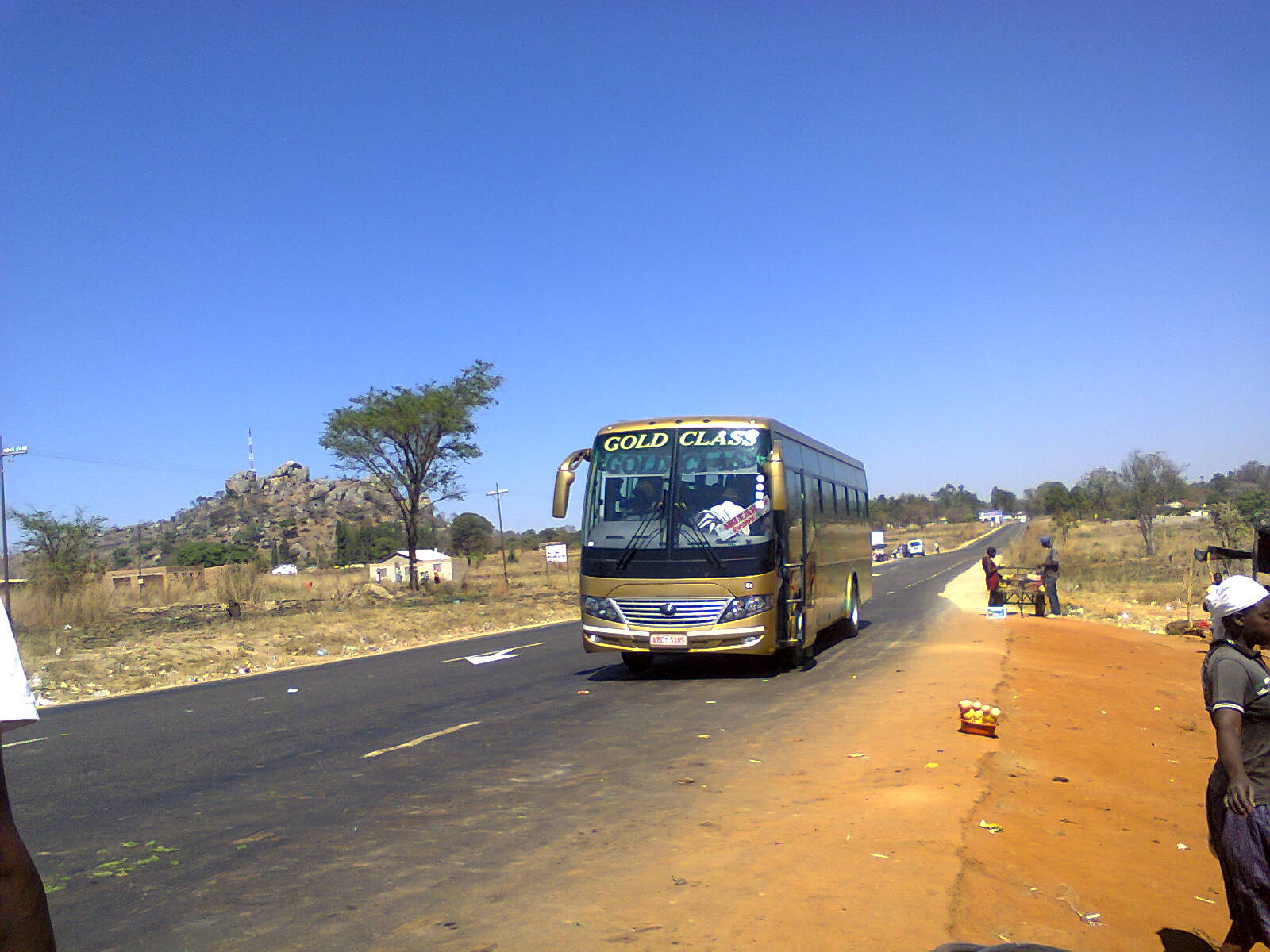
Bus en route from Mutare to Harare

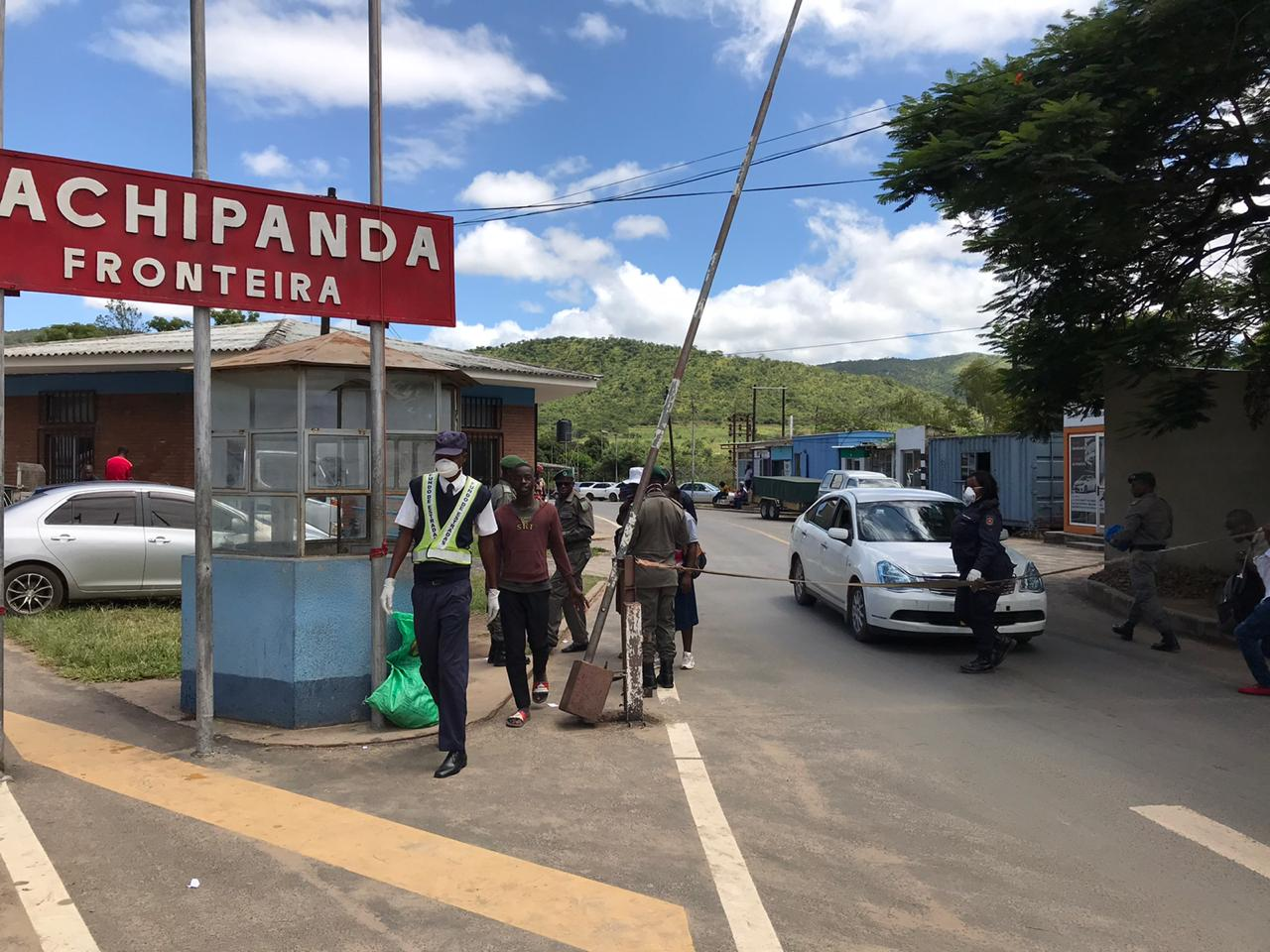
Machipanda border post

From Chirundu, it goes south-east as the R3 highway (A1 highway) to the city of Harare (Zimbabwe's Capital City), where it becomes the R5 highway (A3 highway) south-east to the city of Mutare, where it passes through various suburbs using various roads and crosses the Machipanda Border Post into the Republic of Mozambique and the border town of Machipanda. The Zimbabwean section is 625 kilometres.

=== Mozambique ===
From Machipanda, it goes eastwards as the N6 route, through Manica and Chimoio, to end in the city of Beira. The Mozambican section is 300 kilometres.

== Developments ==
In 2023, the governments of Zambia, DR Congo and Angola agreed to a 30-year concession for the 1700 km section of the parallel Benguela railway/Lobito Corridor from Kolwezi to the Atlantic coast (Lobito; Benguela) in order to link the landlocked Copperbelt Region with its closest ocean (the Atlantic Ocean) for trade, as Zambia and DR Congo are two large producers of both copper and cobalt. The railway is known as the Lobito Atlantic Railway.

== See also ==
- Trans-African Highway network
