= Mupfure River =

River in Zimbabwe

Coordinates: 17°30′20″S 29°23′18″E

Mupfure River in the Sanyati River catchment (center)

Mupfure River is a river in Zimbabwe with its source in Mashonaland East Province and crossing into Mashonaland West Province. It joins the Sanyati river which flows northwards and drains into the Zambezi river. The river is a site for alluvial gold mining.

The Mupfure River has been the site of several accidents and drownings. In August 2022, two vehicles travelling on the Harare-Masvingo highway got into an accident and tumbled into the river. Five people inside the vehicles drowned after falling into the river.

In April 2024, a man fleeing from police jumped into the river to escape. He was found later drowned by local residents.
