= Marula, Zimbabwe =

Marula
- Village
- Marula located in Zimbabwe Map
- Coordinates: 20°28′29″S 28°05′16″E
- Country: Zimbabwe
- Province: Matabeleland South

Marula is a small village and railway station on the railway line and the A7 road between Bulawayo and Plumtree, located 75 km from Bulawayo. Because of its location on the railway line, Marula started as a social and religious centre for the surrounding farms in the early colonial period, following the eviction of the Kalanga people from the area by the British South Africa Company.
