= A7 road (Zimbabwe) =

Road in Zimbabwe

Location
- Country: Zimbabwe

Highway system
- Transport in Zimbabwe

A7 Road is a national road in Zimbabwe that connects Bulawayo with the Plumtree Border Post with Botswana. It is popularly known as the Bulawayo-Plumtree Road. The A7 is part of Trans-Africa Highway 4 (Cairo–Cape Town Highway). It is one of the two routes that form the R2 Route, which connects the Plumtree Border with Harare.

== Background ==
The A7 Road picks up from Botswana's A1 Road at Plumtree border post and runs eastwards for 110 km to Bulawayo. Driving from Bulawayo to South Africa via Botswana the A7 Road crosses the border into Botswana joining the A1 road which continues south through Francistown, then Gaborone to Ramatlabama at the border with South Africa. On the South African side the road continues to Mafikeng as the N18 road.

The highway was rehabilitated in 2015 to meet world class standards in a project called the Plumtree-Bulawayo-Harare-Mutare Highway.

The A7 Road is also part of a regional highway connecting Botswana and Harare called the R2 Highway.

== Operations ==
The A7 Road's number one purpose is to link all Zimbabwe with Botswana and western South Africa.

== Waypoints ==
There are three major waypoints on the A7 Road.

There seems to have been a deliberate waypoint naming criteria on the three main waypoints on this route.

• Plumtree, Marula and Figtree were all named after edible fruit trees in the particular area.

From the border with Botswana the first port of call is Plumtree, a settlement named after the numerous indigenous plum trees in the area.

Plum trees found here are mainly those whose fruits are commonly called Gingerbread Plums. The tree is also called the Hissing tree or the Mobola Plum. In ChiShona it is called muhacha or muchakata, and in isiNdebele umkhuna. Botanically it is named the Parinari curatellifolia.

The Mobola Plum is an evergreen tropical tree in Zimbabwe, and also in the greater part of Africa. There are also several home-grown species of plum trees in Zimbabwe but the ones in Plumtree are the wild Mobola Plum.

• The second port of call is Marula. The Marula is a drought resistant leafy tree that yields exceptional fruit per tree. One tree can bear up to half a tonne fruit per year. Its wood is used to carve mortars, beehives, drums and stools, and even canoes. It is a protected tree in most rural areas under chieftains. The tree has a large population in Marula, Zimbabwe.

• The third port of call is called Figtree. The fig tree in the area is known simply as fig. Its botanical name is Ficus carica. However both the Ficus carica and the Ficus sycomorus are found in Figtree.

== Junctions ==
Ten kilometres into Zimbabwe the highway comes to Plumtree Town. Here a +89 km road branches right to Mphoengs. Another one also turns right slightly to the east of the Mphoengs Road. This one runs south through the Mangwe Pass and eventually to Mphoengs also..

Thirty-two kilometres from Plumtree there is a small urban village called Marula. Here a road to Mangwe (27 km) through to Kezi branches right.

Another thirty-two kilometres from Marula, Zimbabwe there is a small urban settlement called Figtree. Here a road to Matopos and through to Kezi turns right. Another road that eventually reaches Tsholotsho turns left.

Source: (Automobile Association Road Map 1975)

== Toll Gates ==
There is a Toll Plaza at Figtree.

== Halfway House ==
Travel time from Bulawayo to Plumtree is about 1 hour and 27 minutes.

There is a halfway rest place at Shashani Lodge 59 km from Bulawayo on this Plumtree Road between Figtree and Marula.

== See also ==
- Plumtree-Bulawayo-Harare-Mutare Highway
- R2 Highway
- Transport in Zimbabwe
