= Transport in Zimbabwe =

The government of Zimbabwe is the main provider of air, rail and road services; historically, there has been little participation of private investors in transport infrastructure.

== Railways ==
The railway operator is National Railways of Zimbabwe.

Total: 3,427 km (2012).
Narrow gauge: 3,427 km at 1,067 mm (3 ft 6 in) gauge, 313 km of which is electrified (de-energized due to problematic power supply in 2008) (2002).
Note: this includes the 318 km Beitbridge Bulawayo Railway company line.

=== Railway links with adjacent countries ===
- South Africa - yes - same gauge 1,067 mm (3 ft 6 in)
- Botswana - yes - same gauge 1,067 mm (3 ft 6 in)
- Zambia - yes - same gauge 1,067 mm (3 ft 6 in)
- Mozambique - yes - same gauge 1,067 mm (3 ft 6 in)

=== Maps ===
- UN map
- UNHCR map

== Highways ==
There are 88,100 km of classified roads in Zimbabwe and 17,400 km of them are paved.

=== Primary roads ===
This class is sometimes called "National Roads or Highways". About 5% of the road network are primary roads. Primary roads are the most trafficked and most link neighbouring countries. Zimbabwe is crossed by two trans-African automobile routes: the Cairo-Cape Town Highway and the Beira-Lobito Highway. This part of the road network plays a major role in the importation and exportation of the country's ware and transit freight. Among the primary roads some roads are classified as Regional Road Corridors, while some are just primary roads.

Regional Road Corridors are numbered R1, R2, R3 and so on. They may also be called by their original type and route name like A1, A2, A3 etc. In some cases one type "R" road may be comprise two or more type "A" routes; e.g. R2 comprises A5 and A7 (Harare-Pluntree Road). Ordinary primary roads are numbered P1, P2, P3 etc. These are primary roads but not convenient for cross-border traffic and services.

==== Regional road corridors ====
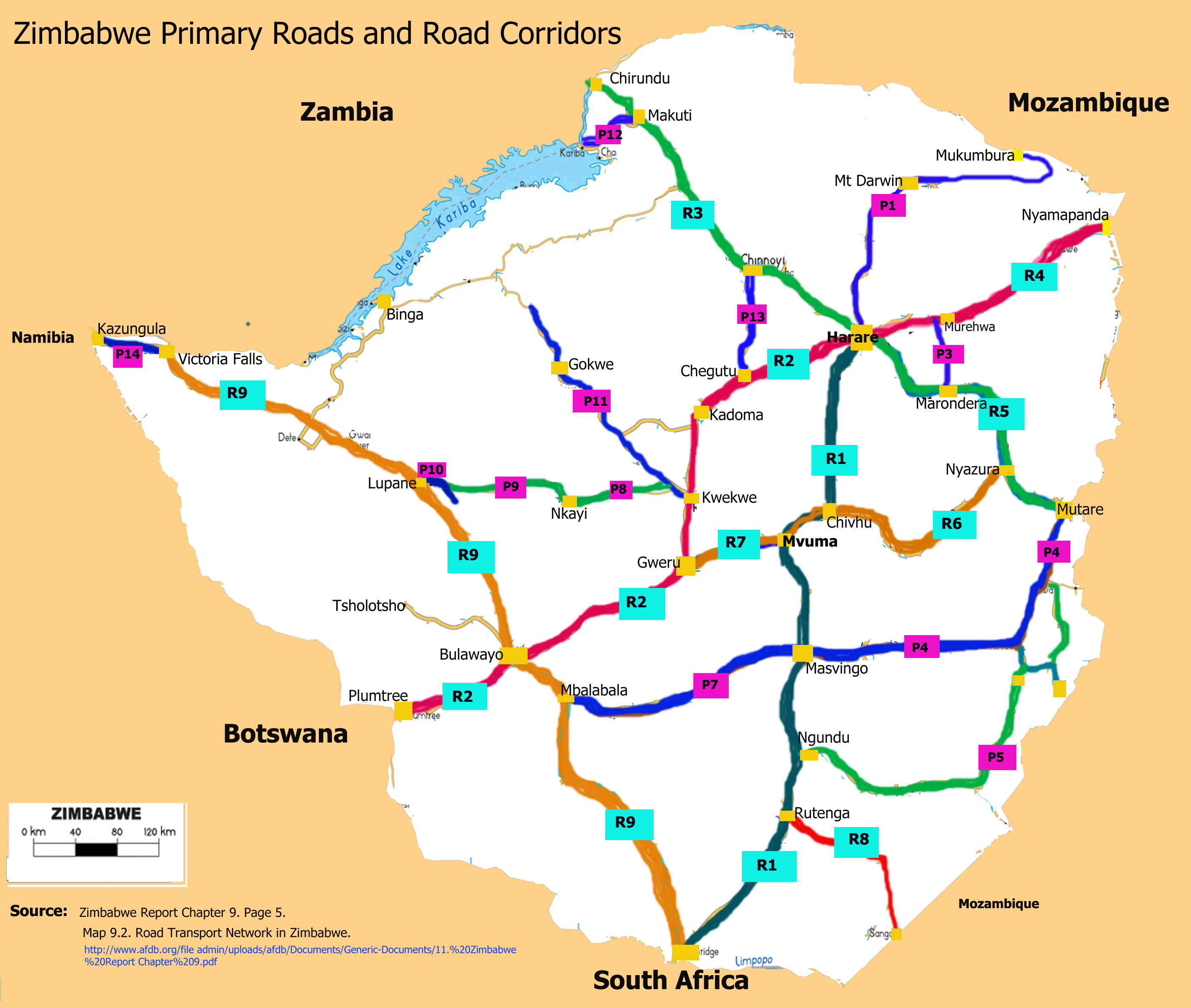
Zimbabwe Primary Roads

• R1 = ( A4 ) (Harare-Masvingo-Beitbridge)

• R2 = ( A5 + A7 ) (Harare-Bulawayo-Plumtree)

• R3 = ( A1) (Harare-Chirundu)

• R4 = ( A2 (Harare-Nyamapanda)

• R5= (A3) (Harare-Mutare)

• R6 = (Chivhu-Nyazura)

• R7 = ( A17 ) (Gweru-Mvuma)

• R8 = (Rutenga-Sango)

• R9 = (A6 + A8 ) (Beitbridge-Bulawayo-Victoria Falls)

Source: [Map 9.2 Road Transport Network of Zimbabwe.]

==== Primary roads (ordinary) ====
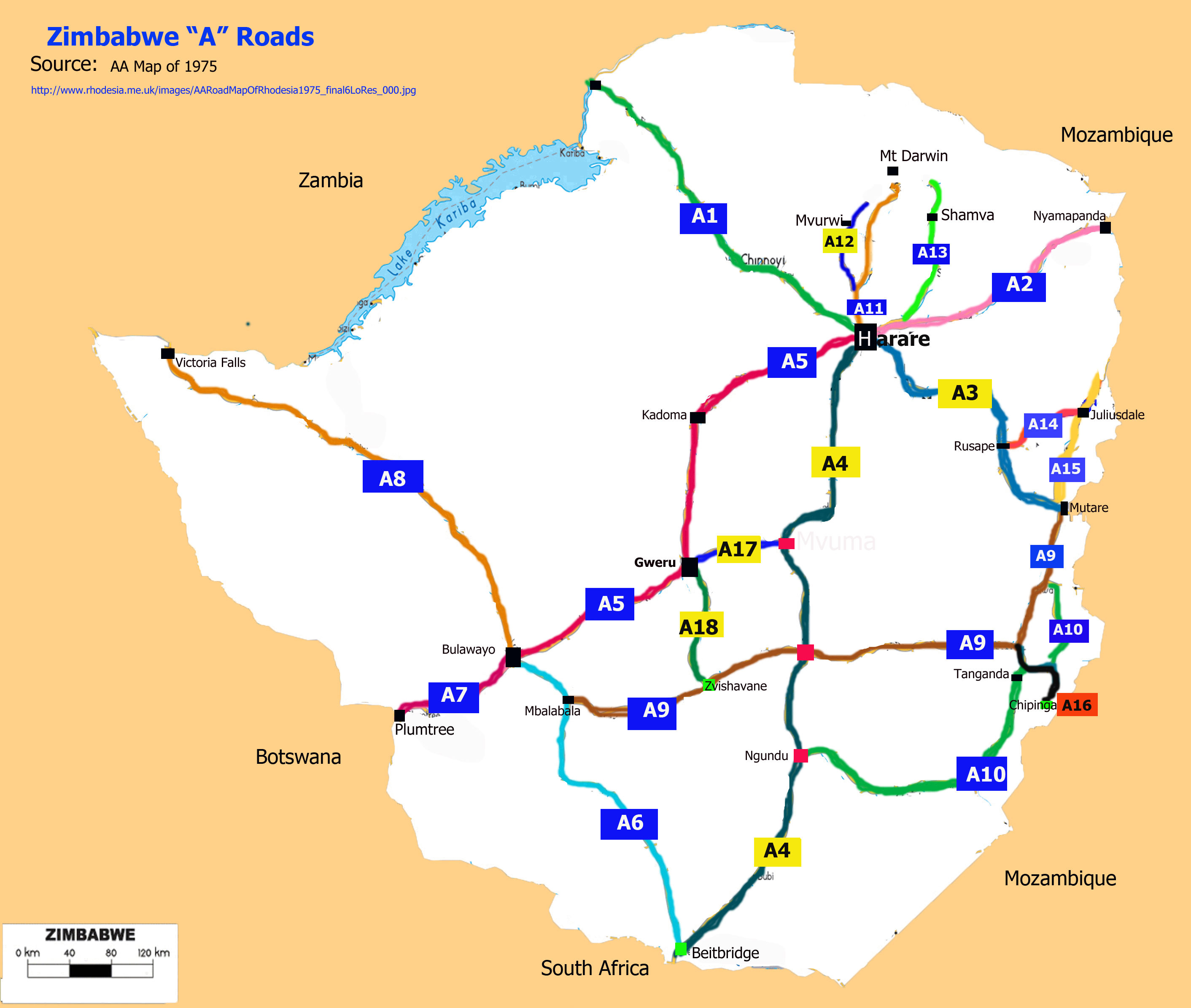
Zimbabwe "A" classified roads as of 1975

• P1 = (Harare-Mt Darwin-Mukunbura)

• P2 = (Mt Darwin-Mukumbura) ? [Error on map]

• P3= (Marondera-Murehwa)

- P4= (Masvingo-Mutare)
- P5= (Ngundu-Tanganda)

• P6= = (Chivhu-Mutare)

• P7= (Mbalabala-Masvingo)

• P8= (Kwekwe-Nkayi)

• P9= (Nkayi-Lupane)

• P10= ( Lupane loop)

• P11= ( Kwekwe-Gokwe Highway )

• P12= ( Makuti-Kariba)

• P13=( Chegutu-Chinhoyi )

• P14= ( Victoria Falls-Kazungula)

(Source: [Map 9.2 Road Transport Network of Zimbabwe.])

=== Secondary roads ===
Secondary roads make up 14% of the network in Zimbabwe. Secondary roads link the major centers within the country. These form a dependable network for the movement of both the people and goods. Some secondary roads are paved and some are gravel unlike primary roads which are all paved.

=== Trunk road system ===
The primary and secondary roads are collectively the trunk road system. The trunk road system carries 70% of the vehicular traffic. Traffic in question here is measured in vehicle kilometers. The trunk road system is managed by the Department of Roads.

=== Tertiary feeder and access roads ===
The roads that link rural areas to the secondary road network are called tertiary feeder and access road. These roads are managed by the District Development Fund (DDF) and by the Rural District Councils (RDC). These roads usually have traffic volumes less than 50 vehicles per day. Together with the unclassified roads and tracks they link rural communities to service centers, schools and health centers. These roads also provide government services to reach rural areas.

=== Urban roads ===
Urban roads make 9% of the road network. Urban roads are managed by urban councils and municipalities.

=== Road density in Zimbabwe ===
About 0.23 km per square kilometre is the road density in Zimbabwe. This is high compared with many developing countries. Only OECD countries have a substantially higher road density than Zimbabwe.

== Waterways ==
Waterways are not used for commercial transport; though some navigation is possible on Lake Kariba.

== Pipelines ==
There is a pipeline for petroleum products 270 km long. (2013)

== Ports and harbours ==
Binga, and Kariba are on Lake Kariba.

== Airports ==
The first aircraft ever to land in Zimbabwe was called the Silver Queen II and it landed in Bulawayo in 1918. It was also involved in Zimbabwe's first air disaster, when the plane crashed after taking-off from the town.

196 (2013)

- List of airports in Zimbabwe

=== Airports - with paved runways ===
- total: 17
- Over 3,047 m: 3
- 2,438 to 3,047 m: 2
- 1,524 to 2,437 m: 5
- 914 to 1,523 m: 6 (2013)

=== Airports - with unpaved runways ===
- total: 179
- 1,524 to 2,437 m: 3
- 914 to 1,523 m: 104
- under 914 m: 72 (2013)
