= Birchenough Bridge =

Human settlement and bridge

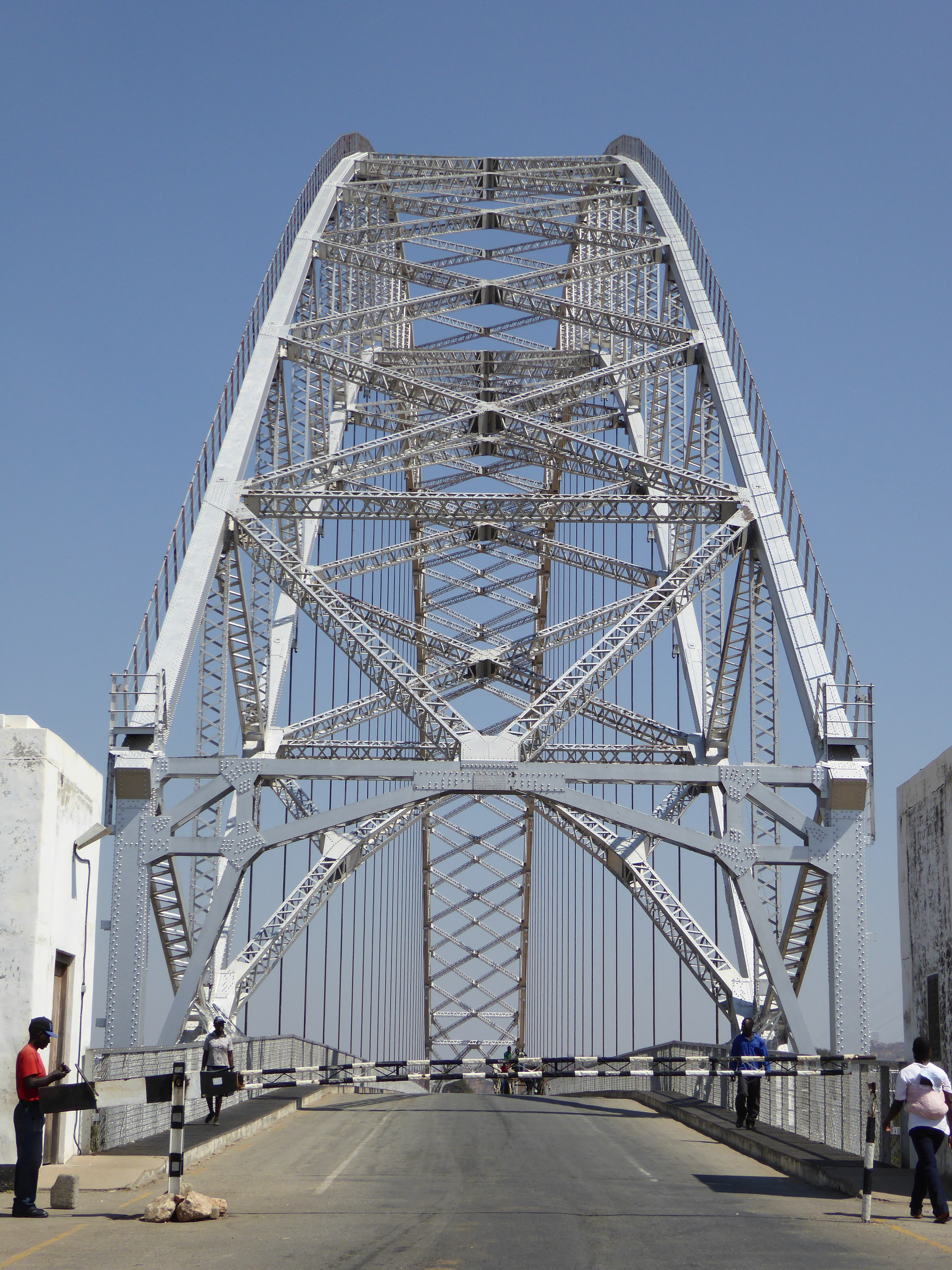
- Entrance of Birchenough Bridge
- Coordinates: 19°57′43″S 32°20′39″E
- Carries: Road
- Crosses: Save River
- Locale: Chipinge, Manicaland

Characteristics
- Total length: 378.2 m (1,241 ft)
- Width: 10 m (33 ft)
- Longest span: 329.4 m (1,081 ft)
- Clearance below: 15.2 m (50 ft)

History
- Constructed by: Dorman Long
- Opened: 20 December 1935; 90 years ago

Location
- Interactive map of Birchenough Bridge

Birchenough Bridge is the name for both a bridge across the Save River (pronounced Sa've) and a village next to the bridge. Birchenough Bridge is called after Sir Henry Birchenough. Birchenough Bridge is located 62 km from Chipinge in the Manicaland province of Zimbabwe linking Chipinge with Buhera.

== History ==
The bridge was funded at a cost of £145 000.00 and planned by the Beit Trust, a foundation chaired at the time by Sir Henry Birchenough whose ashes are buried beneath the structure of the bridge. Ralph Freeman, the bridge's designer, was also the structural designer on the Sydney Harbour Bridge and consequently the two bridges bear a close resemblance, although Birchenough is only two-thirds as long as the Australian bridge. It was built by Dorman Long and completed in 1935. At a length of 1,080 feet (329 m) it was the third longest single-arch suspension bridge in the world at the time.

In the 1970s a 40-tonne load limit was imposed on the bridge but in 1984 the bridge was widened (roadway: 7.2 m to 10 m wide) and strengthened as part of the World Bank's Highway Project One. The village which sprang up next to the bridge has become the centre of a small-scale farming area.

The bridge is widely considered by Zimbabweans as being one of the country's finest pieces of engineering, and as such, it appears on the twenty-cent coin. The Zimbabwe Department of Roads has reduced its load capacity not to allow any vehicle weighing more than 25 tonnes. This had reduced business activities in the areas nearby since heavy vehicle trucks will not be allowed to cross the bridge.
