= R3 road (Zimbabwe) =

Road in Zimbabwe

Location
- Country: Zimbabwe

Highway system
- Transport in Zimbabwe

The R3 highway is a primary road in Zimbabwe that runs from the capital city, Harare, to the Chirundu Border Post with Zambia. It is also known as the A1 highway. It is part of both the Beira–Lobito Highway and the Cape to Cairo Road.

== Background ==
The R3 highway is also known as the Harare-Chirundu Highway. Its historical and popular name is the A1 Highway and is 354 kilometres (220 miles) long. In Harare it can be picked up at the intersection of Samora Machel Avenue (A5) and Leopold Takawira Street. Follow Leopold Takawira north and turn right into Hebert Chitepo Avenue, then left into Sam Nujoma Street up to Lomagundi Road (A1) at coordinates 17°47′01″S 31°02′18″E, and from Chirundu it can be picked from the Chirundu Bridge or the Otto Beit Bridge. ( 16°02′31″S 28°51′41″E )

=== Pan African Highway Link ===
Together with the R1 Highway which runs from Harare to Beitbridge, the R3 Highway forms the Chirundu-Beitbridge Regional Road Corridor, which is part of the North-South Corridor known as the Cape to Cairo Road. Chirundu to Beitbridge is 897 kilometres (557 miles).

=== Trans-African Highway Link ===
Together with the R5 Highway, which runs from Harare to Mutare, the R3 forms part of the Beira-Lobito Highway which is the Trans-African Highway Network route number 9.

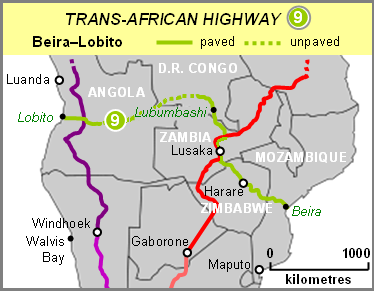

== Rehabilitation ==
The A1 Highway is currently under rehabilitation together with other regional road corridors in Zimbabwe. Most highways in Zimbabwe are more than 30 years old, outliving their 20-year life span, and they need rehabilitation. The rehabilitation of this highway is in conformation of the Southern African Development Community (SADC) Regional Infrastructure Master Plan for the North-South Corridor. North-South Corridor is central a passage for SADC members' exports and imports to and from the north. It is seen as crucial to unlocking further development within SADC and the Common Market for Eastern and Southern Africa (COMESA).

== Waypoints ==
Waypoints from South to North; Harare to Chirundu.

=== Banket ===
The first significant waypoint from Harare is Banket. This waypoint is usually overlapped by motorists because it is only 24.7 km (15.3 mi) before Chinhoyi. -17.38333, 30.4

=== Chinhoyi ===
Entering Chinhoyi, the first billboard encountered just after the Manyame Bridge notifies one of a rest place just a kilometre away. Ten years from opening its doors, the Chinhoyi University of Technology Hotel has become a favourite stop-over for travellers along the Harare-Chirundu Highway. When you live Chinhoyi towards Karoi about 10 kilometres (6.2 miles) north, (that's about 136 kilometres (85 mi) from Harare and about before 251 kilometres (156 mi) from Chirundu Border Post is the Chinhoyi Caves Recreational Park, besides the road. The caves are a network of tunnels and caverns which are fascinating places to visit. The water temperature of the Chinhoyi caves is always at 22 degrees Celsius (72 Fahrenheit). The caves are a stopover option for those not wanting to stop in town. Open hours are 0700 hrs to 1700 hrs (GMT).

=== Karoi ===
Karoi is about 85 kilometres (53 miles) by road, north-west of Chinhoyi, or about 200 kilometres (120 miles) from Harare and 154 kilometres (96 miles) before Chirundu.

About 8 kilometres (5.0 mi) north of Karoi towards Makuti, the Karoi-Gokwe-Binga Roads turns right and eventually reaches Matusadona National Park. Sanyati Bridge is 115 kilometres (71 mi) along this road, west.

=== Makuti ===
Makuti is the last significant waypoint before Chirundu. The P12 highway branches sharply right here to Kariba through to Zambia’s Siavonga Border Post via the Kariba Dam wall.

=== Marongora ===
Marongora Wildlife Campsite is about 168 kilometres (104 mi) from Chinhoyi towards Chirundu, that is just more than 267 kilometres (166 mi) northwest of Harare. Tickets to Manna Pools are obtained here. 16°13′24″S 29°09′41″E

Marongora Map External link. Marongora Office Photo External link.

== Bridges ==
There are several high-level bridges along the highway. However, during the floods of January 2015 some bridges between Chinhoyi and Karoi flooded, a very rare scenario. Chikuti River Bridge was blocked by flowing water near Lion's Den before Mhangura Road turn-off. and Denga River Bridge was also blocked.

== See also ==
- ZINARA
- Trans-African Highway
- Cairo-Cape Town Highway
- Chirundu-Beitbridge Regional Road Corridor
