= R2 road (Zimbabwe) =

Road in Zimbabwe

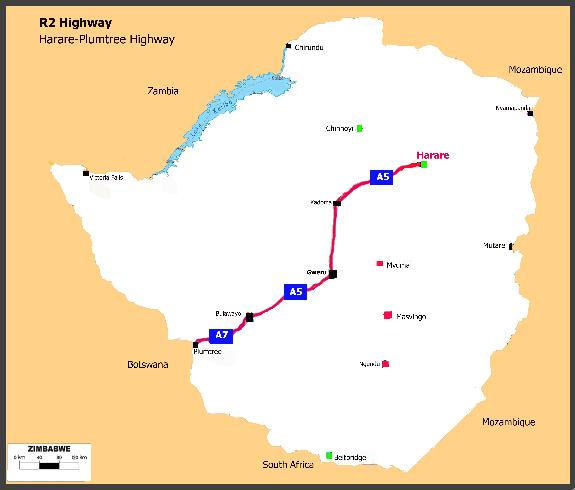

Route information
- Length: 549 km (341 mi)

Location
- Country: Zimbabwe

Highway system
- Transport in Zimbabwe

The R2 Road is an international road in Zimbabwe that runs from Harare (Capital of Zimbabwe), through Bulawayo, to Plumtree border post.

It is a combination of the A5 Highway which is the Harare-Bulawayo Highway and the A7 Highway which is the Bulawayo-Plumtree Highway. For the purpose of regional identity the highway from Botswana to Harare the capital city of Zimbabwe is named Road 2 (R2).

Source: [Map 9.2 Road Transport Network of Zimbabwe.]

In Harare the road can be picked at the Harare Show Grounds as Samora Machel Avenue. 17°49′46″S 31°01′59″E and in Plumtree, Zimbabwe it can be picked at the Border Post or in town at the railway station. 20°29′24″S 27°48′23″E

== Background ==
The R2 was rehabilitated together with the R3 in the project undertaken by the Zimbabwe National Roads Adminuration (ZINARA) as part of the regional transit highway dubbed the Plumtree-Bulawayo-Harare-Mutare Highway project in 2015.

== Operations ==
The connects Harare and Botswana serving numerous waypoints along the route course.

=== Harare-Bulawayo Highway ===
The A5 covers the Harare to Bulawayo via Kwekwe road.

=== Bulawayo-Plumtree Road ===
This highway covers Figtree, Zimbabwe, Marula and Plumtree.

A7 Highway actually ends 10.2 kilometres (6.3 mi) past Plumtree Town, where it meets Botswana's A1 Highway.

== Distance Table ==
The R2 is 549 kilometres (341 mi) long. The A5 Highway part is 439 kilometres (273 mi) and the A7 Highway is 110 kilometres (68 mi) right to the border post.

From	To	Distance
Harare	Chegutu	106 kilometres (66 mi)
Chegutu	Kadoma	35 kilometres (22 mi)
Kadoma	Kwekwe	72 kilometres (45 mi)
Kwekwe	Gweru	62 kilometres (39 mi)
Gweru	Bulawayo	164 kilometres (102 mi)
Bulawayo	Plumtree	100 kilometres (62 mi)
Plumtree	Border Post	10.2 kilometres (6.3 mi)
Harare	Plumtree Border Post	549 kilometres (341 mi)

== See also ==
- The Plumtree-Bulawayo-Harare-Mutare Highway
- A7 Highway
- ZINARA
