= Chivhu =

Chivhu Enkeldoorn
- Location within Zimbabwe
- Coordinates: 19°01′10.61″S 30°53′50.16″E
- Country: Zimbabwe
- Province: Mashonaland
- Time zone: UTC+2 (CAT)
- Climate: Cwb

Chivhu, originally known as Enkeldoorn, is a small town in Zimbabwe, with an estimated population of 10,000 in 2007. It is located 146 km (91 mi) south of Harare on the main road south to Masvingo and South Africa.

== Name ==
Chivhu's original name, Enkeldoorn, is a Dutch and Afrikaans word meaning "lone thorn". It refers to the tree acacia robusta and implies that a single specimen once grew there. The name was adopted in 1891 but was changed to Chivhu in 1982, on the second anniversary of Zimbabwe's independence. The current name comes from the Shona language and means "anthill".

== History ==
Enkeldoorn was founded by Afrikaans-speaking Boer farmers and settlers in around 1850, and was the first white settlement in Zimbabwe. It became an Afrikaner stronghold in a predominantly English-speaking white Rhodesia, giving it the nickname of 'the Republic of Enkeldoorn'.

== Economy ==
Chivhu has an agricultural economy, based in poultry farming and dairy cattle. Beef, pork, maize, and millet are also important produce.
