= Chirundu, Zimbabwe =

Village and border post in Zimbabwe

Coordinates: 16°02′S 28°51′E

Chirundu is a village and border post in Zimbabwe on the border with Zambia, in Mashonaland West province. The name Chirundu means "Big Hill". The village is located on the banks of the Zambezi river, and as a result it lies in the hot Zambezi Valley. It is the site of the Chirundu Bridges, two road bridges across the Zambezi river.

On the Zambian side of the river is a slightly larger town also called Chirundu. The bridge is the principal border crossing for traffic travelling from Harare in Zimbabwe, to Lusaka in Zambia. Chirundu is surrounded by wildlife/safari areas, elephants frequently wander around the village. It is also a popular destination for fishing.

== See also ==
- Chirundu Bridge
- R3 road (Zimbabwe)
