= Beitbridge =

- Town
- Beitbridge
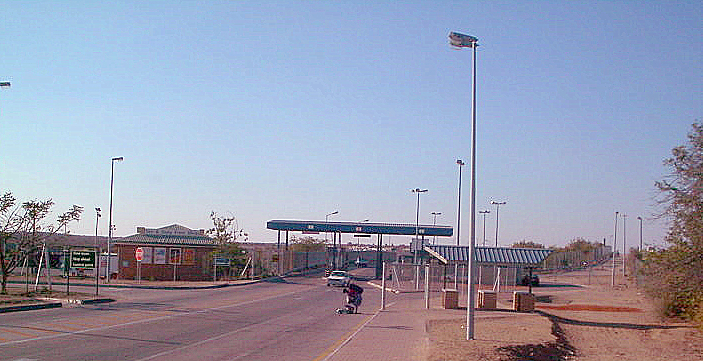
- Beitbridge Borderpost, Zimbabwe

- Location within Zimbabwe Location within Africa
- Coordinates: 22°13′S 30°00′E
- Country: Zimbabwe
- Province: Matabeleland South
- District: Beitbridge
- Established: 1929
- Elevation: 457 m (1,499 ft)

Population (2022 census)
  - Total: 58,100
- Time zone: UTC+2 (CAT)
- Climate: BSh

Beitbridge is a border town in the province of Matabeleland South, Zimbabwe. The name also refers to the border post and bridge spanning the Limpopo River, which forms the political border between South Africa and Zimbabwe. The border on the South African side of the river is also named Beitbridge.

== Background ==
The town lies just north of the Limpopo River about 1 km from the Alfred Beit Road Bridge which spans the Limpopo between South Africa and Zimbabwe. The main roads are the A6 highway to Bulawayo and the Victoria Falls, being 321 kilometres (199 mi) and 758 kilometres (471 mi) away respectively and the R1 to Masvingo and Harare. According to the 2012 population census, the town had a population of 41,767 dominated by the Venda and Ndebele people. There is a sizable percentage of Shona people from other provinces. This is a busy border post with traders from all over Zimbabwe. The Beitbridge border post is the busiest road border post in Southern Africa.

== Climate ==
Climate data for Beitbridge (1961–1990)
Month	Jan	Feb	Mar	Apr	May	Jun	Jul	Aug	Sep	Oct	Nov	Dec	Year
Record high °C (°F)	43.3 (109.9)	42.3 (108.1)	43.3 (109.9)	39.4 (102.9)	36.7 (98.1)	36.6 (97.9)	33.9 (93.0)	40.2 (104.4)	40.0 (104.0)	43.3 (109.9)	44.4 (111.9)	44.7 (112.5)	44.7 (112.5)
Mean daily maximum °C (°F)	33.5 (92.3)	32.8 (91.0)	32.0 (89.6)	30.4 (86.7)	28.2 (82.8)	25.4 (77.7)	25.4 (77.7)	27.6 (81.7)	30.2 (86.4)	31.8 (89.2)	31.8 (89.2)	33.1 (91.6)	30.2 (86.4)
Mean daily minimum °C (°F)	21.9 (71.4)	21.5 (70.7)	20.1 (68.2)	17.0 (62.6)	11.9 (53.4)	8.2 (46.8)	7.9 (46.2)	10.7 (51.3)	15.2 (59.4)	18.6 (65.5)	20.3 (68.5)	21.2 (70.2)	16.2 (61.2)
Record low °C (°F)	12.8 (55.0)	14.4 (57.9)	11.7 (53.1)	3.9 (39.0)	2.8 (37.0)	−1.1 (30.0)	−0.6 (30.9)	0.0 (32.0)	4.4 (39.9)	8.9 (48.0)	11.1 (52.0)	13.3 (55.9)	−1.1 (30.0)
Average rainfall mm (inches)	56.8 (2.24)	54.8 (2.16)	34.1 (1.34)	25.6 (1.01)	10.0 (0.39)	3.1 (0.12)	0.4 (0.02)	1.5 (0.06)	14.9 (0.59)	28.4 (1.12)	48.7 (1.92)	53.7 (2.11)	332.0 (13.07)
Average rainy days	5	4	3	2	1	1	0	0	1	2	5	5	29
Average relative humidity (%)	62	64	60	58	52	56	51	46	46	48	53	57	54
Mean monthly sunshine hours	244.9	217.5	241.8	240.0	275.9	252.0	263.5	272.8	252.0	248.0	225.0	226.3	2,959.7
Mean daily sunshine hours	7.9	7.7	7.8	8.0	8.9	8.4	8.5	8.8	8.4	8.0	7.5	7.3	8.1
Source 1: World Meteorological Organization
Source 2: Deutscher Wetterdienst (extremes, humidity, and sun)

== The Town ==
Beitbridge has an estimated 2,570 houses in formal settlements (primarily for government officials and mid-level private sector staff) and 3,000 in informal settlements. Formal-settlement dwellings are mainly two- to three-room brick houses, while those in the informal settlements are among the worst mud houses in Zimbabwe. The mud houses have since been demolished. Average house occupancy in the low-income and informal settlements varies considerably, as many people do not bring their families to Beitbridge, but includes at least four people. Recreational facilities are limited in low-income areas, consisting largely of bars and soccer pitches.

== Population and Social Issues ==
The town has a population of 58,574 people, as of 2022.

Beitbridge has an estimated 2,570 houses in formal settlements (primarily for government officials and mid-level private sector staff) and 3,000 in informal settlements. Average house occupancy in the low-income and informal settlements varies considerably, as many people choose not to house their families here. Recreational facilities are limited in low-income areas, consisting largely of bars and soccer pitches.

== The Bridge ==
The Alfred Beit Road Bridge is named after Alfred Beit, founder of the De Beers diamond mining company and business associate of Cecil Rhodes. He was also a director of a number of companies, among them the British South Africa Company and Rhodesia Railways. The original bridge was constructed in 1929 at a cost of $600,000 and financed jointly between the Beit Railways Trust and the South African Railways. The new bridge was completed in 1995, and was officially opened on 24 November. It was built by the Zimbabwean Government, which now benefits from the tolls levied on crossings. The new bridge can accommodate much heavier traffic than the old one could, which is now for rail traffic only.

== Development ==
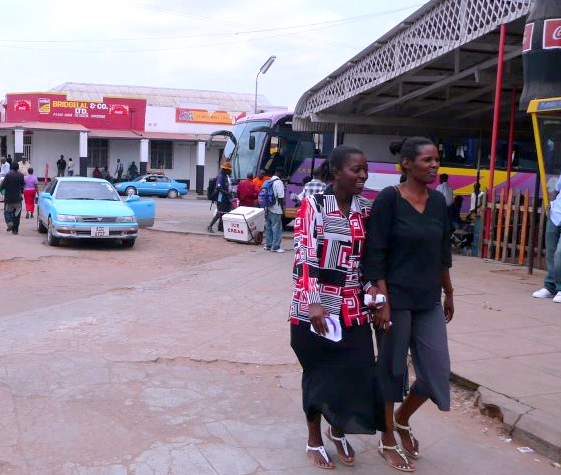
Residents of the town of Beitbridge, 2006

On the South African side of the border the N1 highway connects this border post to the main economic centres of Pretoria (463 km) and Johannesburg (521 km). The closest town is Musina (16 km). On the Zimbabwean side of the border post the road splits in two, with the A6 running to Bulawayo and the R1 to Masvingo. A railway also passes through this border post, side by side with the road, and splits into a line to Bulawayo and a line to Gweru via Rutenga.

Three railway lines meet at Beitbridge: the South African Spoornet line to Polokwane, the National Railways of Zimbabwe line to Gweru via Rutenga and the Beitbridge Bulawayo Railway.

=== Education ===
There are four primary schools in the town namely Beitbridge Mission, Beitbridge Government, Dulivhadzimo Primary and St Mary's Primary School. There is a private school in the town named under Oakleigh House Trust School. Two secondary schools, Vhembe High School and St Joseph's Secondary School, cater for the post primary education in the town. There is no tertiary education facility in the town and high school graduates travel to districts outside Beitbridge for tertiary education.

=== Venue ===
Dulivhadzimu Stadium, a small multi-purpose arena in the town was chosen by the ZANU-PF led 21st February Movement to host the annual national celebration of Robert Mugabe's date of birth on Saturday, 23 February 2008. On 21 February, two days before, Mugabe had turned 84. It was reported that workers repaired the potholes on the main roads in the city to make sure Mugabe's motorcade moved swiftly with a measure of comfort.

== Transportation ==
The Beitbridge Bulawayo Railway serves the town with train services to Bulawayo.
