= List of dams and reservoirs in Zimbabwe =

The following is a partial list of dams in Zimbabwe.

== List of dams (reservoirs) ==
| Name (alt.) | Nearest local | Province | Impounds | Year completed (commissioned) | Capacity (MegaL) | Map ref. | Notes |
|---|---|---|---|---|---|---|---|
| Kariba Dam | Kariba | Mashonaland West | Zambezi river | 1959 | 1800 | 16°31′23″S 28°45′42″E | |
| Tokwe Mukorsi Dam | Masvingo | Masvingo Province | Tokwe River | 2017 | 1750 | 20°43′40″S 30°54′11″E | |
| Lake Mutirikwi | Masvingo | Masvingo Province | Mtilikwe river | 1961 | 1425 | 20°14′56″S 31°02′00″E | |
| Lake Manyame | Harare | Mashonaland West | Manyame river | 1976 | 490 | 17°48′17″S 30°36′56″E | |
| Osborne Dam | Mutare | Manicaland | Odzi River | - | 400 | 18°45′59″S 32°29′08″E | |
| Mazvikadei Dam | Banket | Mashonaland West | Mukwadzi River | 1988 | 360 | 17°13′14″S 30°23′30″E | |
| Manyuchi dam | Masvingo | Masvingo Province | Mwenezi River | - | 303 | 21°03′14″S 30°22′12″E | |
| Manjirenji Dam | Masvingo | Masvingo Province | Chiredzi river | 1966 | 285 | 20°37′34″S 31°36′34″E | |
| Lake Chivero | Harare | Mashonaland West | Hunyani river | 1952 | 250 | 17°54′01″S 30°47′28″E | |
| Mayfair Dam | Esigodini | Matabeleland South | Insiza River | 1976 | 182 | | |
| Sebakwe Dam | Kwekwe | Midlands | Sebakwe river | 1957 | 154 | 19°02′00″S 30°15′00″E | |
| Bangala Dam | Masvingo | Lowveld | Mtilikwe river | 1963 | 130 | 20°41′41″S 31°13′58″E | |
| Mzingwane Dam | Esigodini | Matabeleland South | Umzingwani river | 1958 | 57 | 20°23′35″S 28°58′26″E | |
| Ncema Upper Dam | Esigodini | Matabeleland South | Ncema river | 1973 | 45 | 20°21′00″S 29°01′00″E | |
| Mushandike Dam | Masvingo | Masvingo Province | Mushandike river | 1938 | 38 | 20°09′00″S 30°38′00″E | |
| Mazowe Dam | Mazowe | Mashonaland Central | Mazowe river | 1920 | 35 | 17°31′18″S 30°59′19″E | |
| Gwenoro Dam | Gweru | Midlands | Lundi river | 1958 | 32 | 19°45′00″S 29°52′00″E | |
| Ngezi Dam | Kwekwe | Mashonaland West | Ngezi River | 1945 | 26 | 18°41′59″S 29°23′58″E | |
| Silalbuhwa Dam | Esigodini | Matabeleland South | Mzingwane River | 1966 | 24 | 20°45′30″S 29°21′38″E | |
| Claw Dam | Zimbabwe | Mashonaland West | Muzvezve river | 1973 | 21 | 18°26′22″S 29°52′50″E | |
| Ncema Dam | Esigodini | Matabeleland South | Ncema river | 1943 | 18 | 20°21′00″S 29°01′00″E | |
| Suri Suri Dam | Chegutu | Mashonaland West | Suri Suri River | 1968 | 9 | 18°05′09″S 29°58′46″E | |
| Ngondoma Dam | Empress Mine | Midlands | Ngondoma River | 1967 | 7 | 18°27′26″S 29°24′50″E | |
| Siya Dam | Bikita | Masvingo Province | Turgwe River | 1977 | 106 | 20°16′00″S 31°37′00″E | |
| Ruti Dam | Buhera | Mashonaland East | Nyazvidzi River | 1976 | 140 | 19°32′27″S 31°43′38″E | |
| Inyankuni Dam | Esigodini | Matabeleland South | Inyankuni River | 1964 | 82 | 20°20′34″S 29°06′55″E | |
| Palawan Dam | Zvishavane | Midlands | Ingesi River | 1978 | 69 | 20°08′06″S 29°48′38″E | |
| Amapongokwe Dam | Somabula | Midlands | Mapongokwe River | 1980 | 39 | 19°47′40″S 29°50′18″E | |
| Antelope Dam | Maphisa | Matabeleland South | Shashani River | 1971 | 15 | | |
| Tiyabenzi Dam | Shangani | Midlands | Shangani River | 1972 | 14 | | |
| Mananda Dam | Solusi | Matabeleland South | Nata River | 1967 | 12 | 20°13′05″S 28°03′21″E | |
| Makado Ranch Dam | Beitbridge | Matabeleland South | Umchabezi River | 1968 | 12 | | |
| Eben Dam | Shamva | Mashonaland Central | Mupfurudzi River | 1968 | 12 | | |
| Harava Dam | Chitungwiza | Harare South Province | Manyame River | 1973 | 9 | 17°59′14″S 31°06′15″E | |
| Pampoenpoort Dam | JM Nkomo Int. Airport | Matabeleland North | Trib. of Mguza River | 1970 | 8 | 19°52′03″S 28°35′54″E | |
| Odzani Dam | Penhalonga | Manicaland | Odzani River | 1965 | 6 | | |
| Mutange Dam | Gokwe | Midlands | Mutange River | 2016 | 5 | 18°12′26″S 29°14′04″E | |

== See also ==
- List of rivers of Zimbabwe
