= List of rivers of Zimbabwe =

The main rivers of Zimbabwe with their catchment areas

This is a list of rivers in Zimbabwe. This list is arranged by drainage basin, with respective tributaries indented under each larger stream's name.

== Rivers ==
- Zambezi River
  - Luenha River
    - Mazowe River (Mazoe River)
      - Ruya River (Luia River)
    - Gairezi River (Cauresi River)
  - Messenguézi River (Umsengedsi River)
    - Mecumbura River (Mkumvura River)
    - Kadzi River
  - Manyame River (Panhame River) (Hunyani River)
    - Angwa River
  - Sanyati River (Umniati River)
    - Munyati River
      - Umsweswe River
      - Sebakwe River
        - Kwekwe River
      - Ngezi River
    - Mupfure River (Umfuli River)
  - Bumi River
  - Sengwa River
  - Sengwe River
  - Masumu River
  - Sebungwe River
  - Gwayi River
    - Shangani River
      - Gweru River
      - Vungu River
    - Mbembesi River
    - Umguza River
  - Deka River
  - Matetsi River
- Pungwe River
  - Honde River
- Buzi River
  - Lucite River
- Save River (Sabi River)
  - Runde River (Lundi River)
    - Chiredzi River
    - Mutirikwe River (Mtilikwe River)
      - Mucheke River
      - Pokoteke River
    - Tokwe River
      - Tokwane River
    - Musavezi River
    - Ngezi River (Ingezi River)
  - Turwi River
  - Devure River
    - Nyazvidzi River
  - Nyazwidzi River
  - Odzi River
  - Macheke River
- Limpopo River
  - Changane River
  - Mwenezi River (Manisi River)
    - Mushawe River
  - Bubye River (Bubi River)
  - Mzingwane River (Umzingwani River)
    - Mtetengwe River
      - Tongwe River
    - Umchabezi River
    - Insiza River
      - Siwaze River
      - Inkankezi River
    - Inyankuni River
    - Ncema River
  - Shashe River (Shashi River)
    - Thuli River (Tuli River)
      - Mwewe River
      - Mtshabezi River
      - Mtshelele River
    - Shashani River
    - Mkolokwe River
    - Sansukwe River
    - Ramokgwebana River
      - Ingwizi River

== Makgadikgadi Pan ==
- Nata River
