= Thuli =

Thuli or Thulli may refer to

== In Nepal ==
- Thuli Bheri, an urban municipality
  - Thuli Bheri River
- Thuli Pokhari, a village development committee

== In Zimbabwe ==
- Thuli River, a major tributary of the Shashe River
  - Thuli–Makwe Dam, on the Thuli River
  - Thuli–Manyange Dam, on the Thuli River
  - Thuli–Moswa Dam, on the Thuli River
- Thuli Parks and Wildlife Land

== Media ==
- Thuli Visham, a 1954 Indian Tamil film
- Thulli Thirintha Kaalam, a 1998 Tamil drama film
- Thulli Vilayadu, a 2013 Tamil comedy thriller film
- "Thuli Thuli", a song from the 2010 Tamil feature film Paiyaa

== Other ==
- Thuli (given name)

== See also ==
- Tuli (disambiguation)
- Tulli, a surname
