= Tulsi (name) =

Tulsi is a name.

== List of people with the given name ==
- Acharya Tulsi (Jain monk) (1914–1997), Indian religious leader
- Tulsi Agarwal (born 1959), Indian politician
- Tulsi Bai Holkar (1788–1817), Indian queen
- Tulsi Chakraborty (1899–1961), Indian actor and comedian
- Tulsi Gabbard (born 1981), American politician
- Tulsi Ghimire (born 1959)
- Tulsi Giri (1926–2018), Nepali politician and the Prime Minister of Nepal from 1975 to 1977
- Tulsi Gowda, Indian environmentalist
- Tulsi Kumar (born 1986), Indian actress
- Tulsi Lahiri (1897–1959), Bengali actor
- Tulsi Ram (born 1944), Indian politician
- Tulsi Ram Khelwan, Fijian political leader
- Tulsi Ram Sharma, Fijian lawyer and trade unionist
- Tulsi Ramsay (1944–2018), Indian film director
- Tulsi Silawat (born 1954), Indian politician
- Tulsi Singh Yadav (died 2015), Indian politician

== List of people with the middle name ==
- Sandeep Tulsi Yadav, Indian Greco-Roman wrestler

== List of people with the surname ==
- Rajkavi Inderjeet Singh Tulsi, Indian Poet & Bollywood Lyricist
- K. T. S. Tulsi (born 1947), Indian politician
- Kashinath Shastri Appa Tulsi, Indian musician and scholar
- Tathagat Avatar Tulsi (born 1987), Indian physician

== See also ==
- Ocimum tenuiflorum
- Tuli (name)
- Thuli (given name)
- Tulli
- Tulsidas
