= Tuli =

Tuli may refer to:

== Modern places (alphabetical by country) ==
- Tülü, Balakan, Azerbaijan
- Tülü, Lerik, Azerbaijan
- Tuli, Trebinje, a settlement in the city of Trebinje, Bosnia and Herzegovina
- Tuli Block, a small region of Botswana
- Tuli, India, a town in Mokokchung District, Nagaland state, India
- Tuli headquarter, the administrative township of Tuli, Mokokchung district, Nagaland, India
- Tuli, Iran, a village in West Azerbaijan Province, Iran
- Tuli, Ardabil, a village in Ardabil Province, Iran
- Tuli Ashaqi, a village in East Azerbaijan Province, Iran
- Tuli, Zimbabwe, a village in the province of Matabeleland South, Zimbabwe

== Ancient places ==
- Tylis (Τύλις), sometimes transliterated into English as Túli or Túlis, a region near ancient Byzantium

== Other uses ==
- Tuli (cattle), a beef cattle breed that originated from Zimbabwe
- Tuli (name)
- Tuli (rite), Philippine ritual male circumcision
- Tuli River, a tributary of the Shashe River in Zimbabwe

== See also ==
- Thuli (disambiguation)
- Tulli, a surname
