= Glassblock Dam =

Proposed dam in Zimbabwe

Coordinates: 20°41′01″S 29°12′18″E

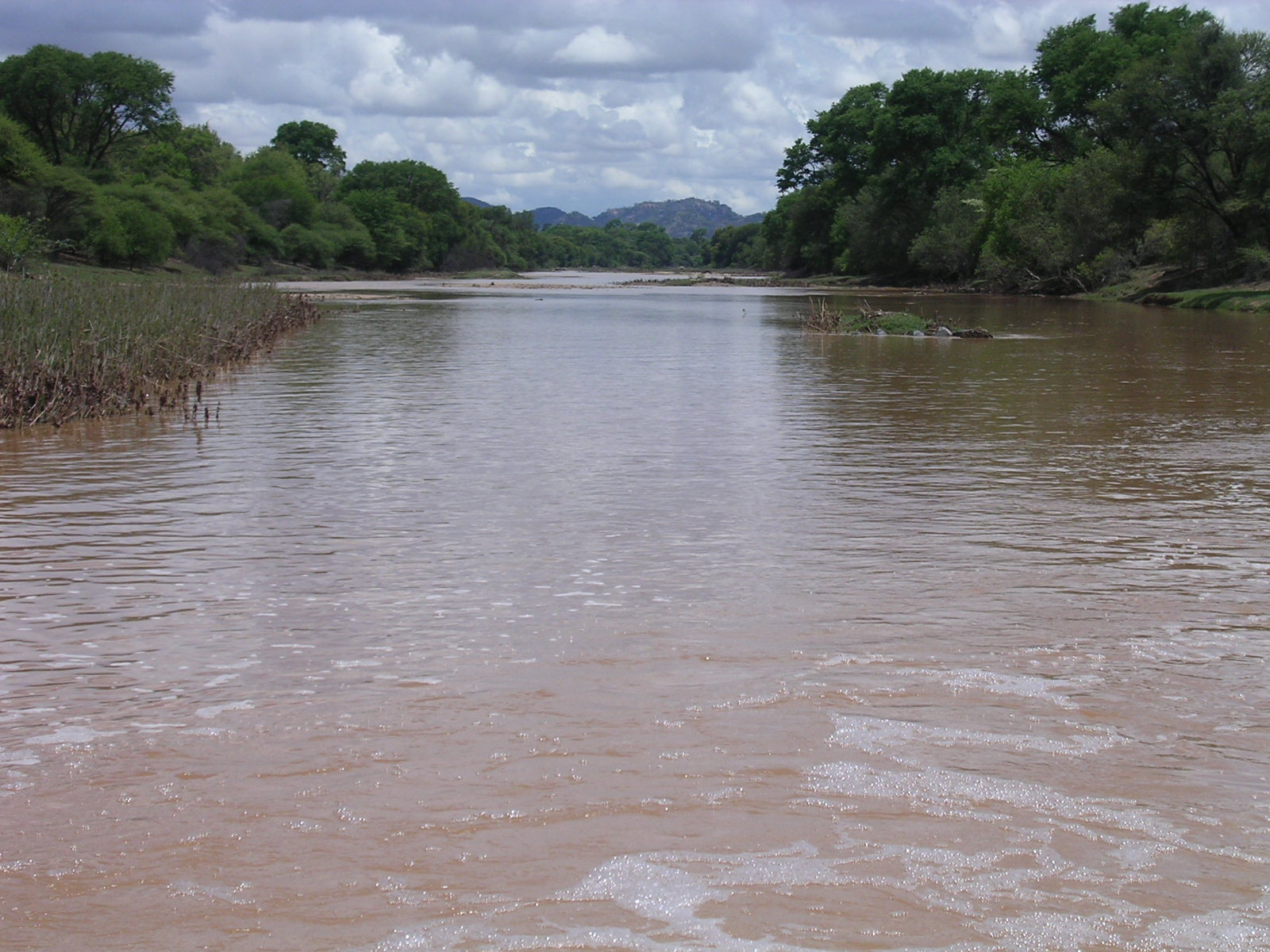
The Mzingwane River in the Glassblock area, Insiza District. The dam site is in the mountains in the background.

Glassblock Dam is a proposed dam on the Mzingwane River, north of Gwanda, Zimbabwe, which would create a reservoir of 129 million cubic meters. Estimated project costs for Bopoma Glassblock Dam are US$100 million. The Dam was designed by ZINWA engineers and is planned as a zoned earth-fill embankment 2.5 km long and up to 40 meters high. Water from the reservoir would be pumped 33 km to the existing waterworks at Ncema, where there is an existing connection to Criterion Waterworks on the outskirts of Bulawayo. Construction of the dam is an initiative to address the Bulawayo water crisis in the medium term. The Dam will be owned by Bulawayo, whereas the Dam will belong to ZINWA in accordance to the Water Act. The Dam is presumed to ease pressure from the government coffers and give the government breathing space to focus on the demanding Gwayi-Shangani Project. The dam will have the capacity to supply the city with 70 million litres per day.
