= Mzingwane =

Mzingwane may refer to

- Mzingwane River a tributary of the Limpopo River in Zimbabwe
- Mzingwane Dam, a reservoir on the Mzingwane River
- Mzingwane High School in Esigodini, Zimbabwe
