= Ngezi River =

Ngezi River may refer to:

- Ngezi River (Masvingo), a tributary of the Runde River, Zimbabwe
- Ngezi River (Midlands), a tributary of the Sebakwe River, Zimbabwe
