= Mwewe River =

River in Zimbabwe

Mwewe River is a tributary of the Thuli River in Matabeleland South Province. Its source is near Figtree town in Plumtree.

It flows through Kezi business centre. Despite the region's long dry seasons, the Mwewe maintains several deep, permanent pools. Notable examples include Pedziba, located near Sibale Mountain and the pool of Bhangwane approximately 3 kilometres from where the river crosses the Maphisa to Gwanda all weather road. The Mwewe serves tens of farms along the way from Plumtree district up to the point where it joins Tuli river. Among the prominent of these is Walmer farm.
