= Thuli–Manyange Dam =

Dam in Zimbabwe

Coordinates: 21°15′20″S 28°55′09″E

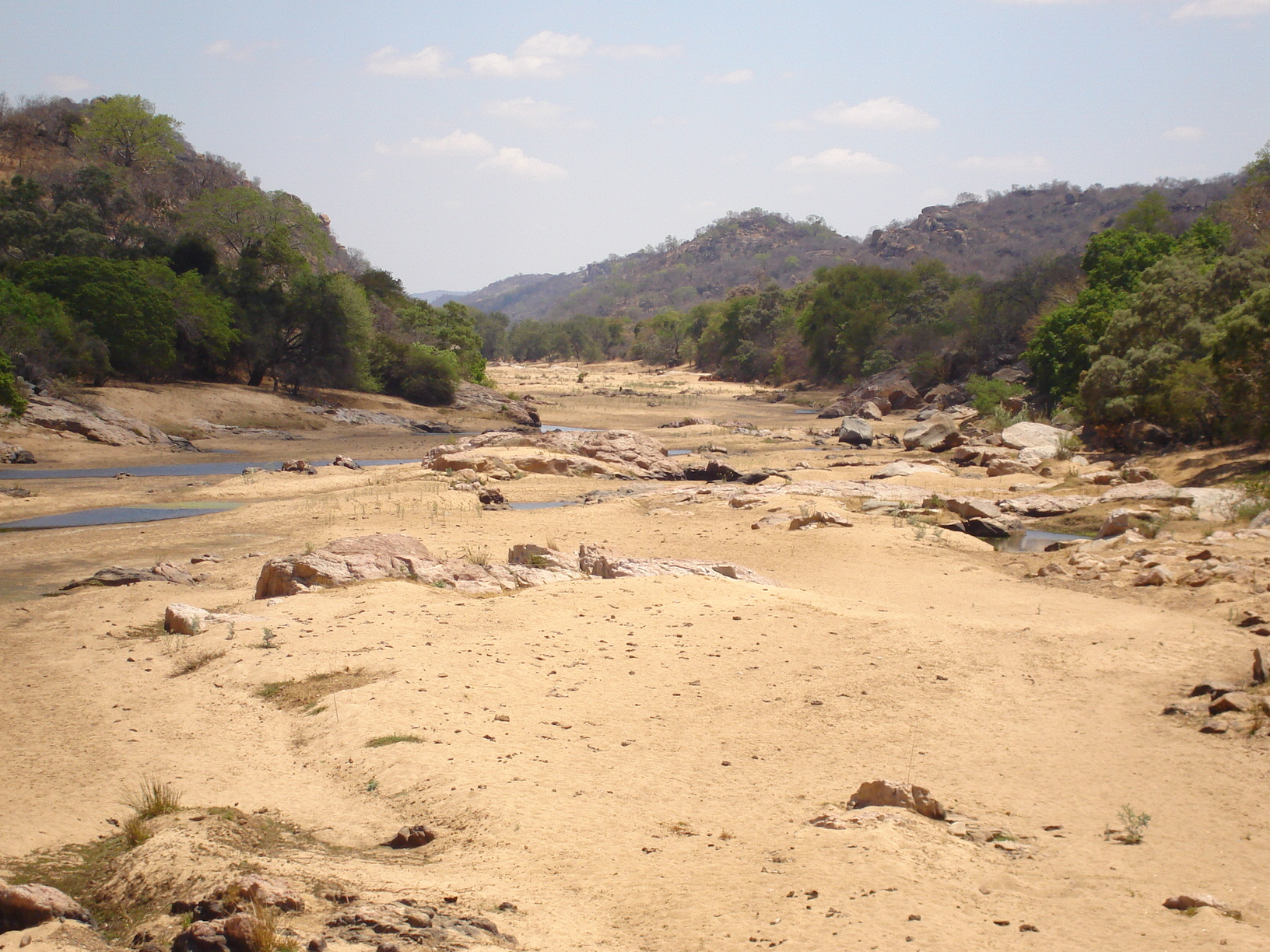
The Thuli–Manyange Dam site in the Thuli Gorge.

Thuli–Manyange (Elliot) Dam is proposed a reservoir on the Thuli River, south of Gwanda, Zimbabwe with a capacity of 33 million cubic metres. It is designed to operate in sync with Thuli–Moswa Dam.
