= List of bridges in Zimbabwe =

== Historical and architectural interest bridges ==
	Name	Distinction	Length	Type	Carries Crosses	Opened	Location	Province	Ref.
1	Kariba Dam Suspension Bridge dismantled	Temporary bridge used for the construction of the Kariba Dam; Span : 424 m (1,391 ft)	219 m (719 ft)	Suspension; Towerless, steel truss deck	Road bridge Zambezi	1958	Kariba–Siavonga; 16°31′17.5″S 28°45′45.6″E	Mashonaland West Province; Zambia	

== Major bridges ==
	Name	Span	Length	Type	Carries Crosses	Opened	Location	Province	Ref.
1	Birchenough Bridge	329 m (1,079 ft)	378 m (1,240 ft)	Arch; Steel through arch	A9 road Save River	1935	Chipinge; 19°57′43.1″S 32°20′39.3″E	Manicaland Province	
2	Otto Beit Bridge	328 m (1,076 ft)	369 m (1,211 ft)	Suspension; Steel truss deck, steel pylons	R3 road Zambezi	1939	Chirundu, Zimbabwe–Chirundu, Zambia; 16°02′16.6″S 28°51′08.2″E	Mashonaland West Province; Zambia	
3	Second Chirundu Bridge	160 m (520 ft)	400 m (1,300 ft)	Box girder Prestressed concrete 119+160+119	R3 road Zambezi	2002	Chirundu, Zimbabwe–Chirundu, Zambia; 16°02′18.8″S 28°51′05.8″E	Mashonaland West Province; Zambia	
4	Victoria Falls Bridge	156 m (512 ft)	198 m (650 ft)	Arch; Steel deck arch	A8 road Zambezi	1905	Victoria Falls–Livingstone; 17°55′42.2″S 25°51′25.3″E	Matabeleland North Province; Zambia	

== See also ==
- Transport in Zimbabwe
- National Railways of Zimbabwe
- Geography of Zimbabwe
- List of rivers of Zimbabwe
- List of crossings of the Zambezi River
