= Maphisa =

Maphisa Khezi-Maphisa(KZM)
- Town
- Motto: Sisebenzela Intuthuko
- Location within Zimbabwe
- Coordinates: 21°03′S 28°26′E
- Country: Zimbabwe
- Province: Matabeleland South
- Founded: 1913

Government
- Elevation: 970 m (3,180 ft)

Population (2020)
  - Total: 21,000
- Time zone: UTC+2 (CAT)
- Climate: BSh

Maphisa (formerly known as Antelope Mine) is a small town in the Matobo District of the province of Matabeleland South. It also serves as the seat of Matobo Rural District Council and ultimately the district's largest business centre and development node. Three kilometres west of Maphisa is the Bhalagwe mountain on the Maphisa to Matjilotje Road. Maphisa Town's economic activity includes extensive gold mining by both large scale and artisanal miners. There are also many informal miners locally known as 'oTsheketshe'. It also boasts in excess of a 1500 hectare intensive farming under pivot irrigation system. There is also extensive commercial ranching in its precinct. The legendary liberation fighter Joshua Mqabuko Nkomo's home village is 40km South West of Maphisa. The amenities found in Maphisa include a modern hotel, Minda Mission which provides education from primary to Advanced level. There are modern supermarkets, a referral Maphisa Hospital and Hlalani Kuhle suburb. King Mzilikazi's grave and Cecil John Rhodes's grave are 84km and 65km respectively North East of Maphisa. The Matobo national park, a World Heritage Site is located 50km North East of Maphisa. SADC Icrisat is located 70km North East of Maphisa.

== Location and history ==
Maphisa is located about 110 km south of Bulawayo and 10 km south of Kezi, Maphisa is also located 66 km from the Province's Capital Gwanda but due to negligence and marginalisation the road is in poor state making it difficult to connect the capital. To reach Gwanda you must travel via Bulawayo about 464 km. The small town was named after king Mzilikazi's Chief Maphisa Fuyana who was the regimental head of that area. Before its rename by locals to 'Maphisa', it was known as Antelope Mine, named after Antelopes which were common in the area before human settlements. Maphisa is also a site of Antelope gold mine which started operating in 1913 but closed in 1919. This mine was also used as a place for Executing Ndebele people during 1983-87 Gukurahundi genocide, it is said People were thrown inside the mine shaft dead or alive. The mine was established on the site of ancient African workings which were first discovered by local people in the 1890s and the first claims were pegged in 1894.

== Modern town ==
The modern town serves as a commercial centre for the surrounding area and the Semukwe communal land. The town of Maphisa draws water from the nearby Gulamela Dam which draws water from the Shashani River. Many mission schools have been established in the area, and the Roman Catholic operates a mission school Minda High School. There is a facility at Minda Mission for Accommodation - Sikhetimpilo Centre.

There is a government run district hospital in Maphisa and The Salvation Army runs a hospital in Tshelanyemba, some 34km south of Maphisa. Bordering Maphisa to the west is ADA(at times referred to as ARDA) which is the Agricultural Development Authority and used to be called Tilcor before 1980s.ADA at its peak provided employment for a large number of people together with the mines in the area.

Antelope Mine is, like a number of other mining areas in Mthwakazi, a centre of settlement for members of the Chewa People. They migrated to the then British colony of Southern Rhodesia in the 1950s from Northern Rhodesia (the present-day Zambia) and Nyasaland (now Malawi) to work as migrant labourers in the mineral extraction and agricultural industries.

During the Zimbabwean government's Gukurahundi campaign against the Ndebele population of southern Zimbabwe in the 1980s, the disused mine workings at Antelope Mine were the site of a concentration camp run by the Fifth Brigade of the Zimbabwean Army. Many prisoners were reported to have been killed and their bodies thrown down the mineshaft. On two instances in 1996 and 1999, skeletal remains believed to be of executed ZAPU prisoners were discovered in the abandoned mineshaft.
