= Tulsi (disambiguation) =

Tulsi or Ocimum tenuiflorum, commonly known as holy basil, is an aromatic perennial plant.

Tulsi may also refer to:

- Vrinda or Tulsi, an avatar of Lakshmi in Hinduism.
- Tulsi (name), a given name and surname
  - Tulsidas (1532–1623), Indian saint and poet
  - Tulsi Gabbard, an American politician and military officer
- Tulsi (film), a 2008 Indian Hindi-language film by K. Ajay Kumar
- Tulsi (2009 film), a 2009 Indian Bhojpuri-language film starring Sidhant Mohapatra
- Tulsi Comics, a defunct Indian comics publisher
- Tulsi Express, an Indian Railways train
- Tulsi Lake, a lake in Mumbai, India

== See also ==
- Thulasi (disambiguation)
- Tulasi in Hinduism
- Tulasi Vivaha, a Hindu ritual
