= Sati Tulasi =

Sati Tulasi may refer to the legend of Vrinda or Tulasi in Hinduism or the following films based on it.

- Sati Tulasi (1936 film), a Telugu film
- Sati Tulasi (1959 film), a Telugu film

== See also ==
- Sati (disambiguation)
- Tulasi (disambiguation)
