= Antelope Mine =

- Town
- Location within Zimbabwe
- Coordinates: 21°03′S 28°26′E
- Country: Zimbabwe
- Province: Matabeleland South
- Founded: 1913
- Elevation: 970 m (3,180 ft)
- Time zone: UTC+2 (CAT)
- Climate: BSh

Antelope Mine, now known as Maphisa, is a town in the Matobo district of the province of Matabeleland South, Zimbabwe. On 14 June 2024, the government of Zimbabwe granted Maphisa the town status. Maphisa is located about 114 km south of Bulawayo and 14 km south of Kezi. The village was established in an area once rich in wildlife and was named after a goldmine which started operating in 1913 but closed in 1919. The mine was established on the site of ancient African workings which were first discovered by Europeans in the 1890s and the first claims were pegged in 1894.

The modern town is a commercial centre for the surrounding area and the Semukwa communal land. Together with the villages of Maphisa, it draws on the nearby Gulamela Dam to irrigate a large communal agricultural scheme. Many mission schools have been established in the area, and the Salvation Army operates both a mission school and a hospital in the village.

Antelope Mine is, like several other mining areas in Zimbabwe, a centre of settlement for members of the Chewa people. They migrated to the then British colony of Southern Rhodesia in the 1950s from Northern Rhodesia (the present-day Zambia) and Nyasaland (now Malawi) to work as migrant labourers in the mineral extraction and agricultural industries.

During the Zimbabwean government's Gukurahundi campaign against the Ndebele population of southern Zimbabwe in the 1980s, the disused mine workings at Antelope Mine were the site of a concentration camp run by the Fifth Brigade of the Zimbabwean Army. Many prisoners were reported to have been killed and their bodies thrown down the mineshaft. On two instances, in 1996 and 1999, skeletal remains believed to be of executed ZAPU prisoners were discovered in the abandoned mineshaft.
