= Thuli River =

Coordinates: 21°48′01″S 29°03′42″E

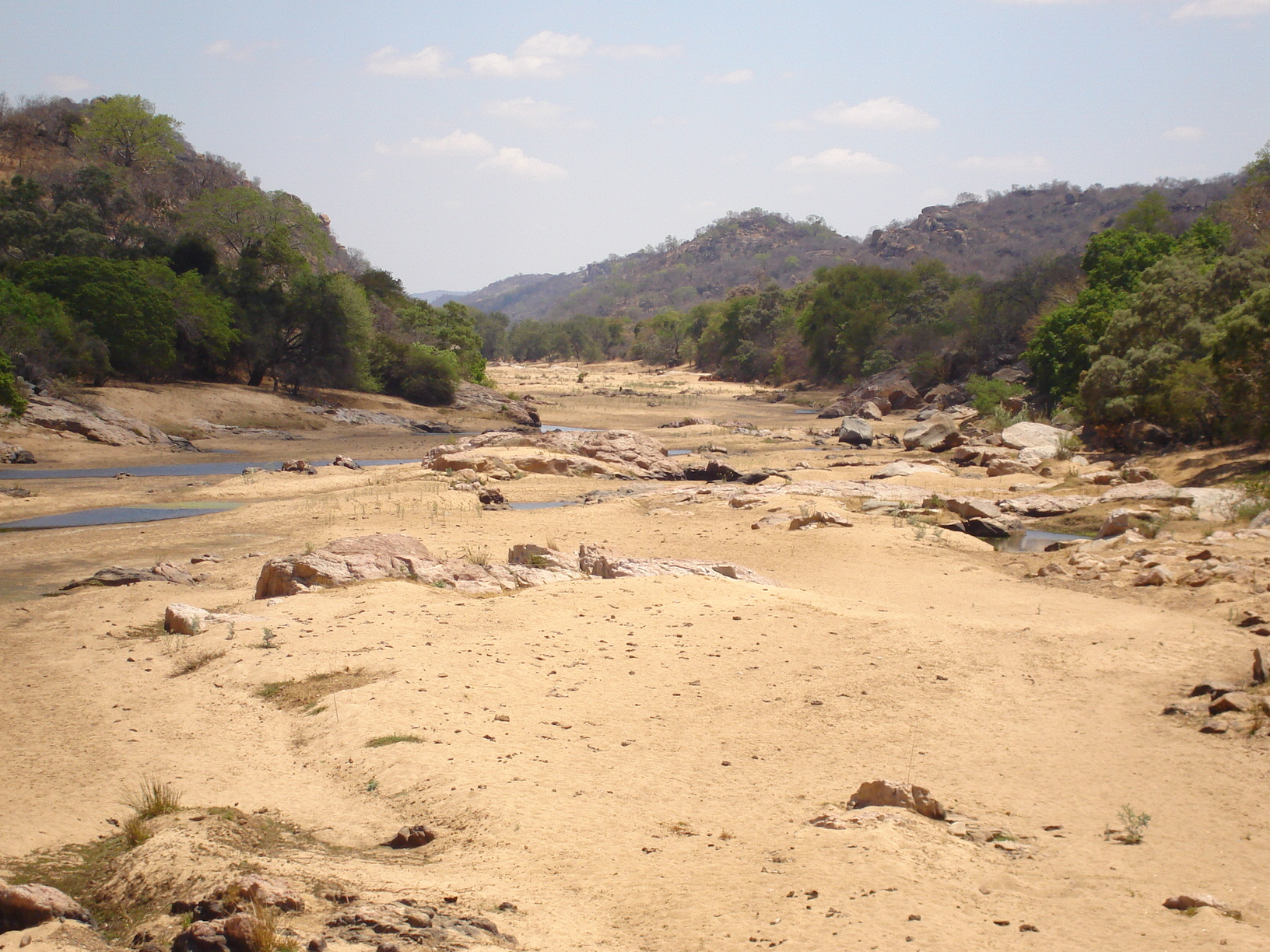
- The Thuli River flowing out of Thuli Gorge, south of Gwanda, Zimbabwe

Location
- Country: Zimbabwe

Physical characteristics
- Source
  - location: Matopo Mission, Matobo District, Zimbabwe
- Mouth
  - location: Shashe River
- Basin size: 7,910 km^{2} (3,050 sq mi)
- Discharge
  - average: 36.0 mm/a (1.42 in/year) unit flow

The Thuli River, former name Tuli River, is a major tributary of the Shashe River in Zimbabwe. It rises near Matopo Mission, Matobo District, and flows into the Shashe River near Tuli village.

== Hydrology ==
The Thuli is an ephemeral river, with declining annual unit runoff.

Its major tributaries include the Mtshabezi, Mtshelele, Sengezane river and Mwewe rivers.

Below Thuli-Makwe Dam, the Thuli is a sand filled channel, with alluvial aquifers in the river channel.

== Towns ==
The Thuli River passes through no major settlements, only the following business centres:

- Freda Mine
- Guyu
- Manama
- Chelesa, Zimbabwe [Sengezane]

== Bridges and crossings ==
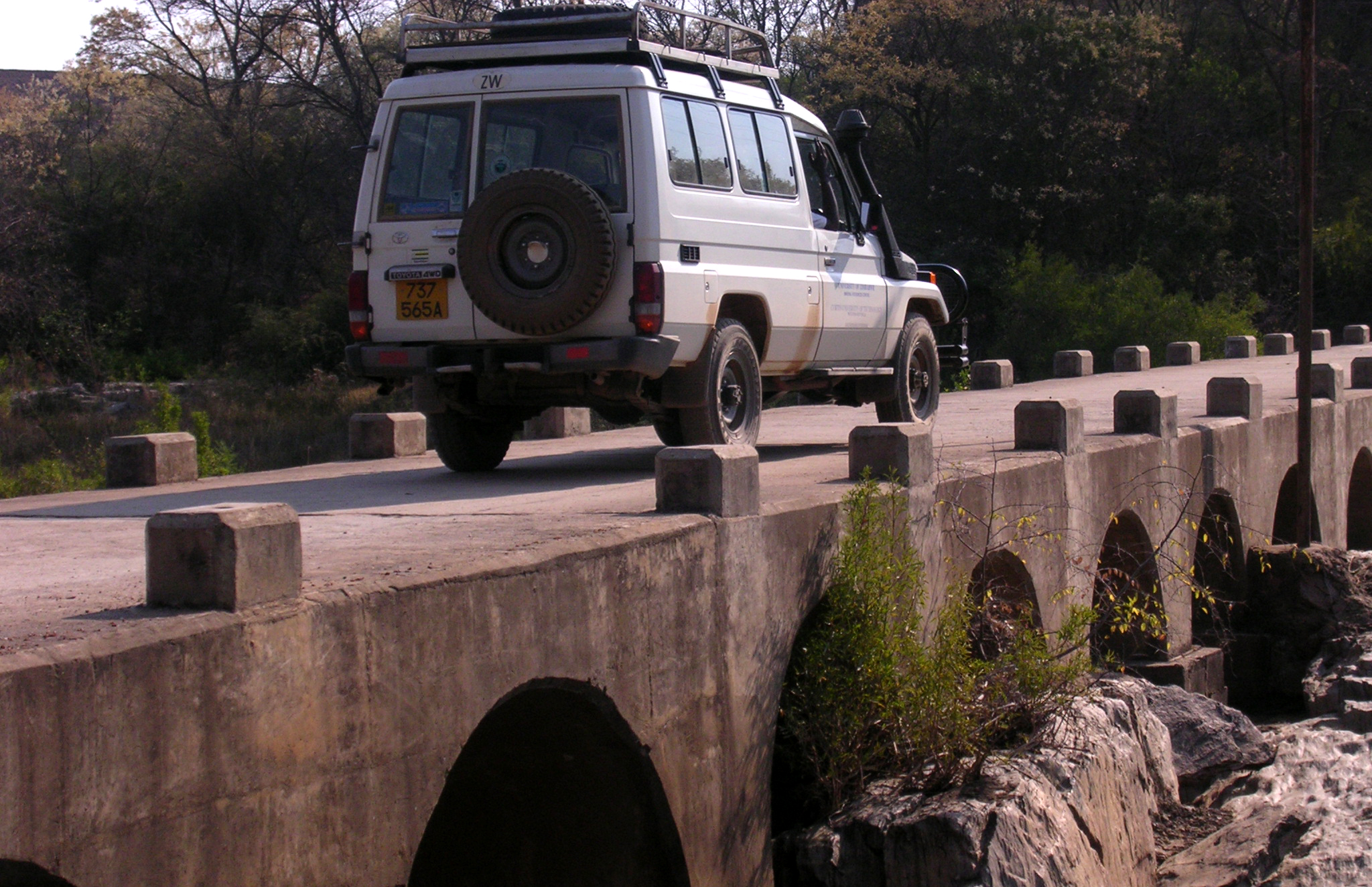
Bridge on the Thuli River at Freda Mine.

There are five main bridges over the Mzingwane River:

- Bridge on Old Gwanda Road, between Matombo Mission and Blanket Mine.
- Bridge on Gwanda - Kezi road, below Thuli-Makwe Dam.
- Elliot Bridge, upstream of Guyu.
- Bridge on Manama - Kafusi road.
- Mankonkoni Bridge on Tuli - Kafusi road. This bridge was destroyed by Cyclone Eline.

There are also a number of fords and crossing points, including:

- Ntalale causeway, which was badly damaged by Cyclone Eline.
- Causeway below Thuli gorge

== Development ==
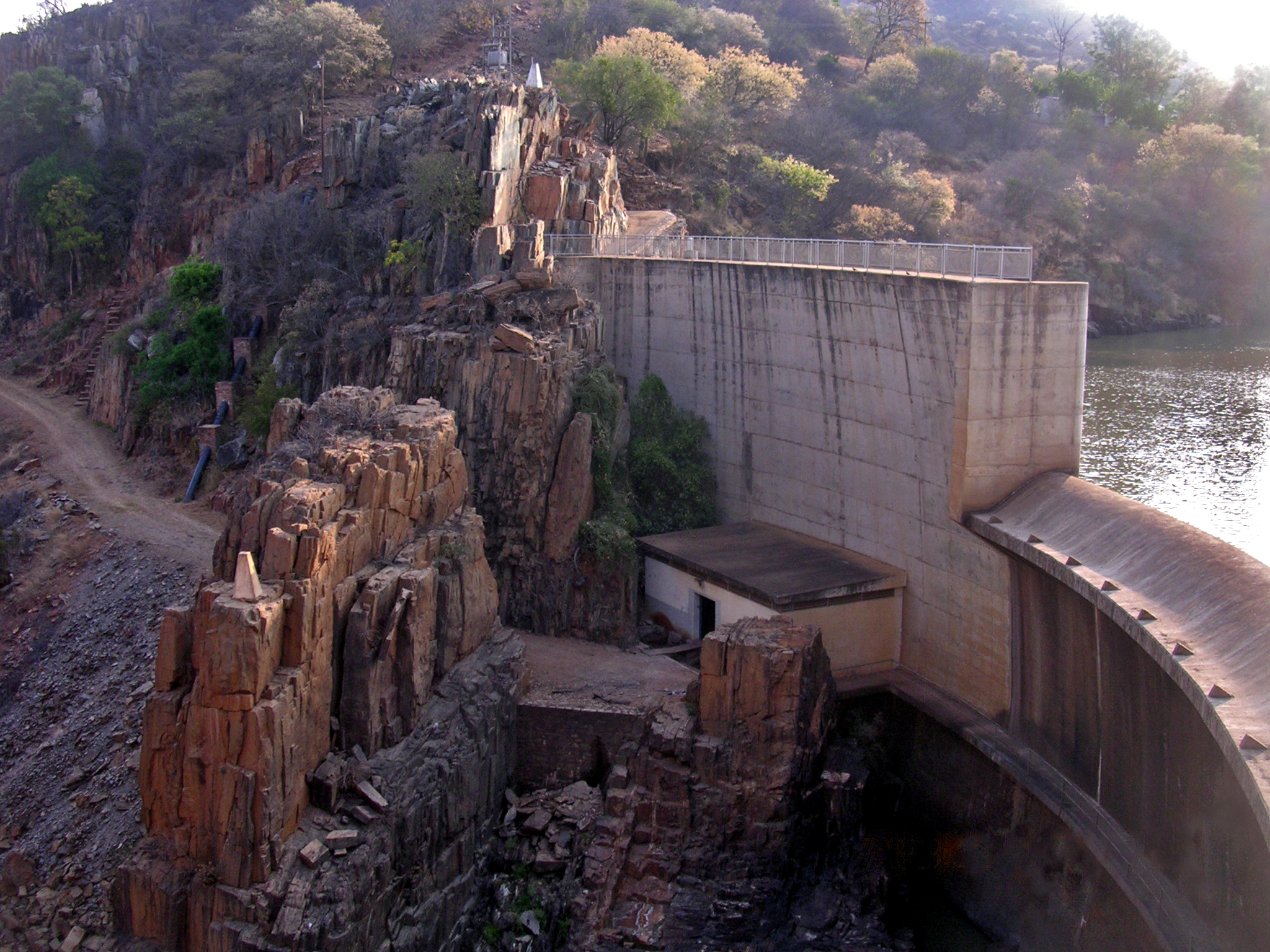
Thuli-Makwe Dam.

In addition to a number of small weirs, there is one major dam on the Thuli River:

- Thuli–Makwe Dam, west of Gwanda. It is located near the confluence with the Mtshelele River and supplies water for irrigation.

The Mtshabezi River (the principal left-bank tributary) is dammed at Mtshabezi, Sheet and Blanket. Mtshabezi Dam will augment the water supply for the City of Bulawayo, once a connecting pipeline has been completed. Sheet and Blanket Dams supply water to the City of Gwanda and Blanket and Vubachikwe Mines.

Two additional dam sites have been selected further downstream:

- Thuli–Moswa, where no development has taken place.
- Thuli–Manyange, upstream of Elliot Bridge, where construction was briefly started in 2007 but is now halted.
