= Piper diagram =

Graphic procedure in the geochemical interpretation of water-analyses

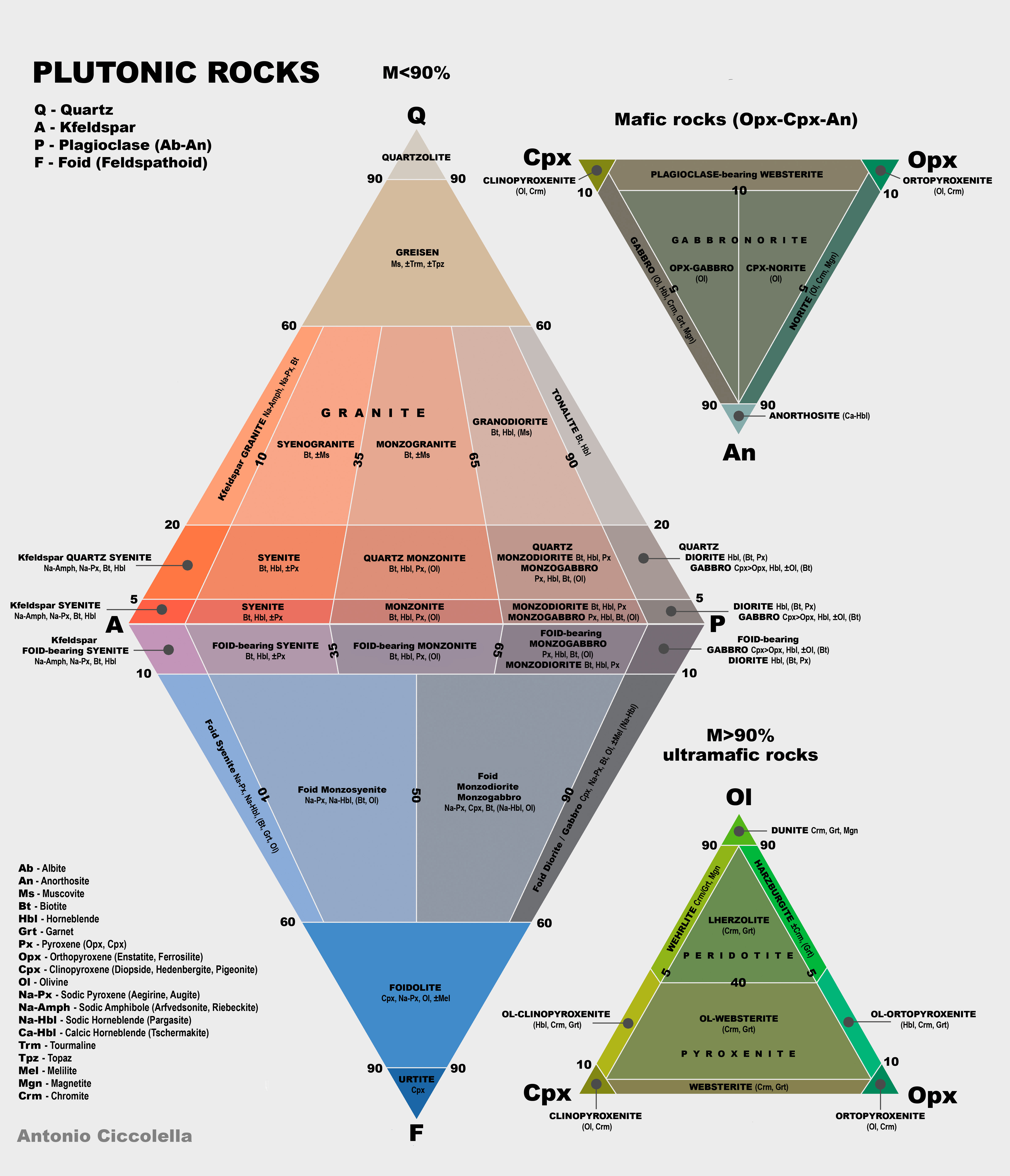
A piper diagram and two ternary diagrams on the composition of intrusive volcanic rocks; see QAPF diagram

A Piper diagram is a graphic procedure proposed by Arthur M. Piper in 1944 for presenting water chemistry data to help in understanding the sources of the dissolved constituent salts in water. This procedure is based on the premise that cations and anions in water are in such amounts to assure the electroneutrality of the dissolved salts, in other words the algebraic sum of the electric charges of cations and anions is zero.

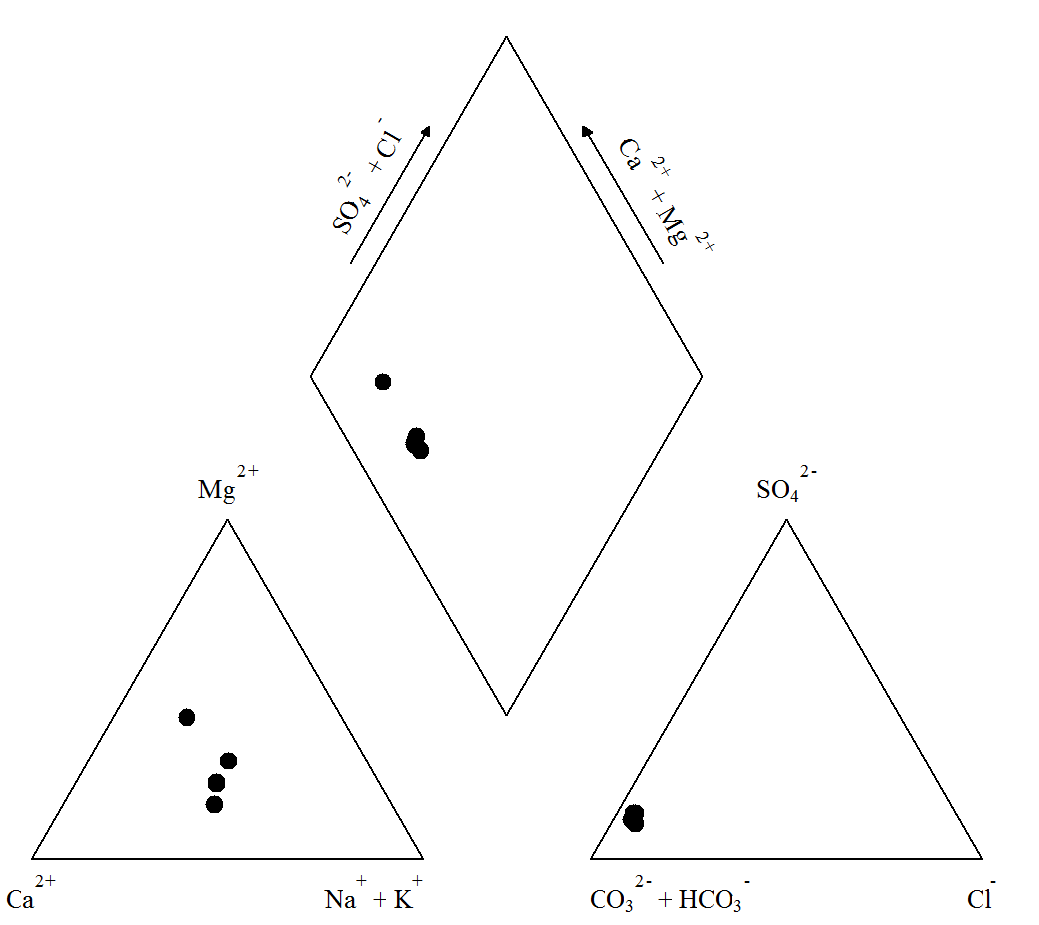
Piper diagram of water samples from the Mtshabezi River, Zimbabwe. Data source:

A Piper diagram is a graphical representation of the chemistry of a water sample or samples.

The cations and anions are shown by separate ternary plots. The apexes of the cation plot are calcium, magnesium and sodium plus potassium cations. The apexes of the anion plot are sulfate, chloride and carbonate plus hydrogen carbonate anions. The two ternary plots are then projected onto a diamond. The diamond is a matrix transformation of a graph of the anions (sulfate + chloride/ total anions) and cations (sodium + potassium/total cations).

The Piper diagram is suitable for comparing the ionic composition of a set of water samples, but does not lend itself to spatial comparisons. For geographical applications, the Stiff diagram and Maucha diagram are more applicable, because they can be used as markers on a map. Colour coding of the background of the Piper diagram allows linking Piper Diagrams and maps

Water samples shown on the Piper diagram can be grouped in hydrochemical facies. The cation and anion triangles can be separated in regions based on the dominant cation(s) or anion(s) and their combination creates regions in the diamond shaped part of the diagram.

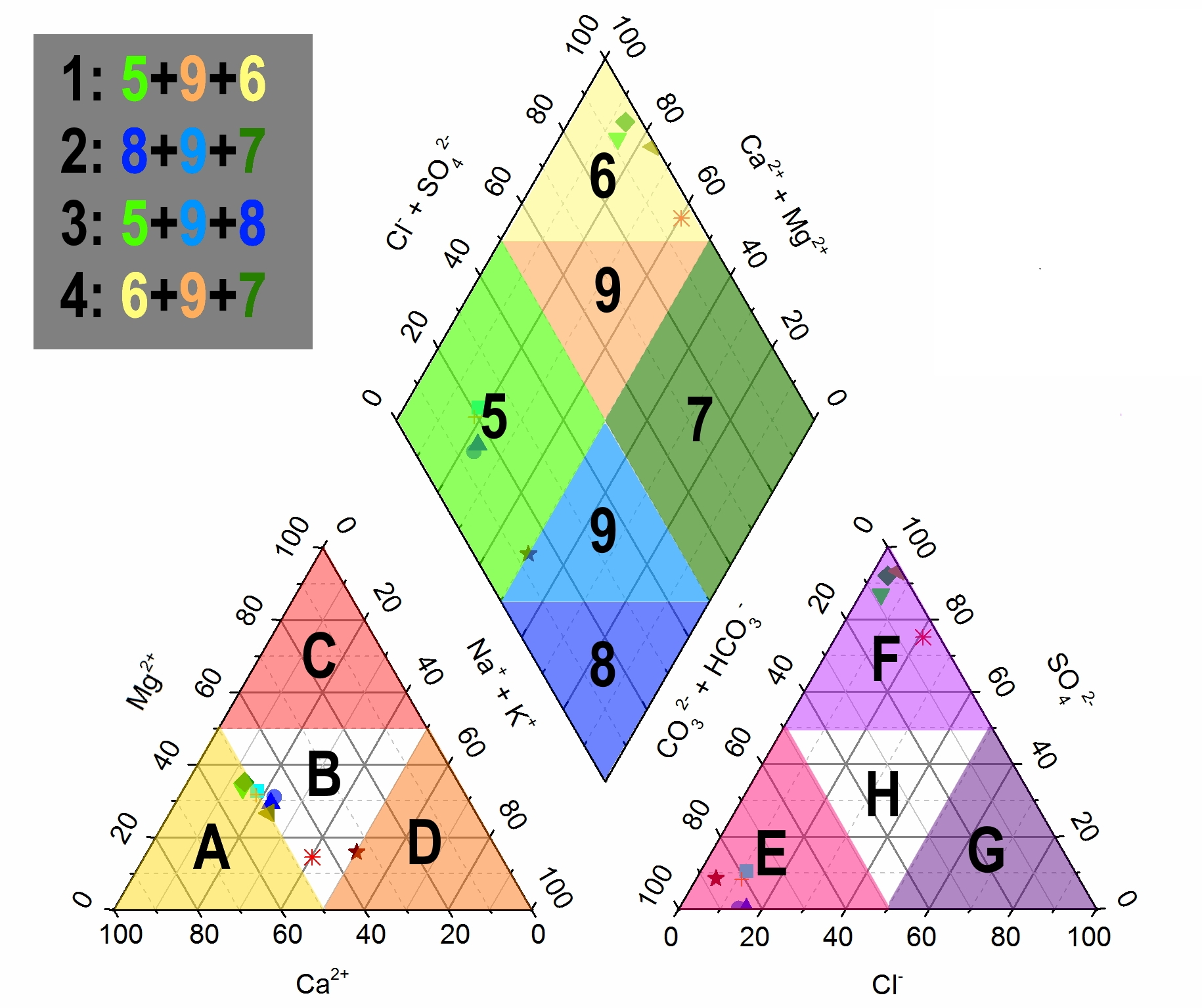
The Piper diagram can be separated in hydrochemical facies. Legend: A: Calcium type; B: No dominant type; C: Magnesium type; D: Sodium and potassium type; E: Bicarbonate type; F: Sulphate type; G: Chloride type; 1: Alkaline earths exceed alkalies; 2: Alkalies exceed alkaline earths; 3: Weak acids exceed strong acids; 4: Strong acids exceed weak acids; 5: Magnesium bicarbonate type; 6: Calcium chloride type; 7: Sodium chloride type; 8: Sodium bicarbonate type; 9: Mixed type

== See also ==
- Ternary diagram, just one triangle
- QAPF diagram, a common application
