= Maucha diagram =

Diagram to show a chemical's composition

A Maucha diagram, or Maucha symbol, is a graphical representation of the major cations and anions in a chemical sample. R. Maucha published the symbol in 1932.

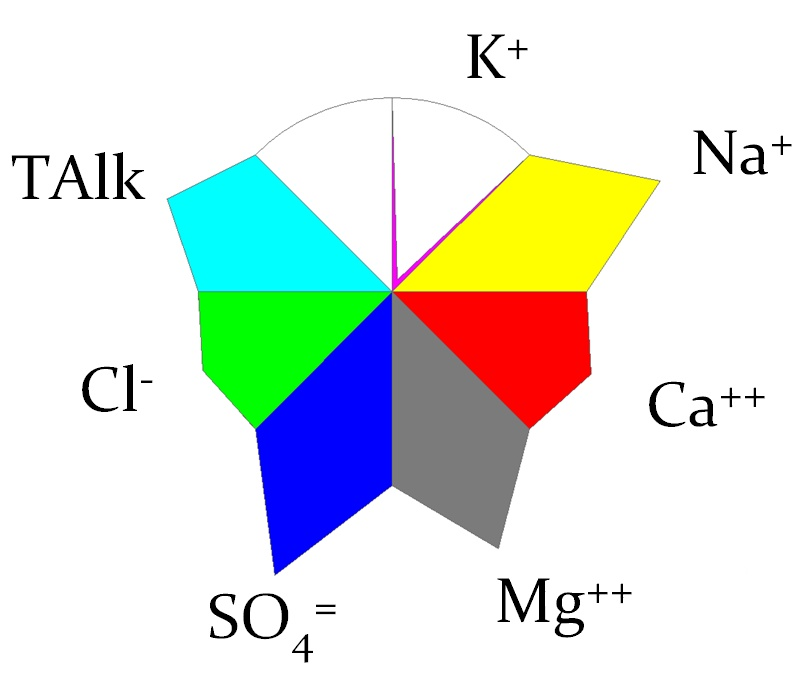
Maucha ionic diagram

It is mainly used by biologists and chemists for quickly recognising samples by their chemical composition. The symbol is similar in concept to the Stiff diagram. It conveys similar ionic information to the Piper diagram, though in a more compact format that is suitable as a map symbol or for showing changes with time. The Maucha diagram is a special case of the Radar chart and overcomes some of the limitations of the Pie chart by having equal angles for all variables and consistently showing each variable in the same position.

The star shape comprises eight kite-shaped polygons, the area of each of which is proportional to the concentration of an ion in milliequivalents per litre. The anions carbonate, bicarbonate, chloride and sulphate are on the left, while the cations potassium, sodium, calcium and magnesium are on the right. The total ionic concentration adds up to the area of the background circle, the total anion concentration adds up to the left semicircle and the total cation concentration adds up to the right semicircle. A method for drawing the diagram in R is available on GitHub.

Broch and Yake modified Maucha's original fixed-size diagram by scaling for concentration.

Further scaling using the logarithm of the ionic concentration enables the plotting of a wide range of concentrations on a single map.
