= Phelandaba Stadium =

Stadium in Gwanda, Zimbabwe

Coordinates: 20.9455°S 29.0178°E

Phelandaba Stadium is a stadium in Gwanda, Zimbabwe, which was built by the Gwanda Rural Council in 1974. The stadium was named by the founder of Gwanda Ramblers Football Club, the late Gwenxana Maduma, and means "a place where all arguments will be settled."
