= Mzingwane River =

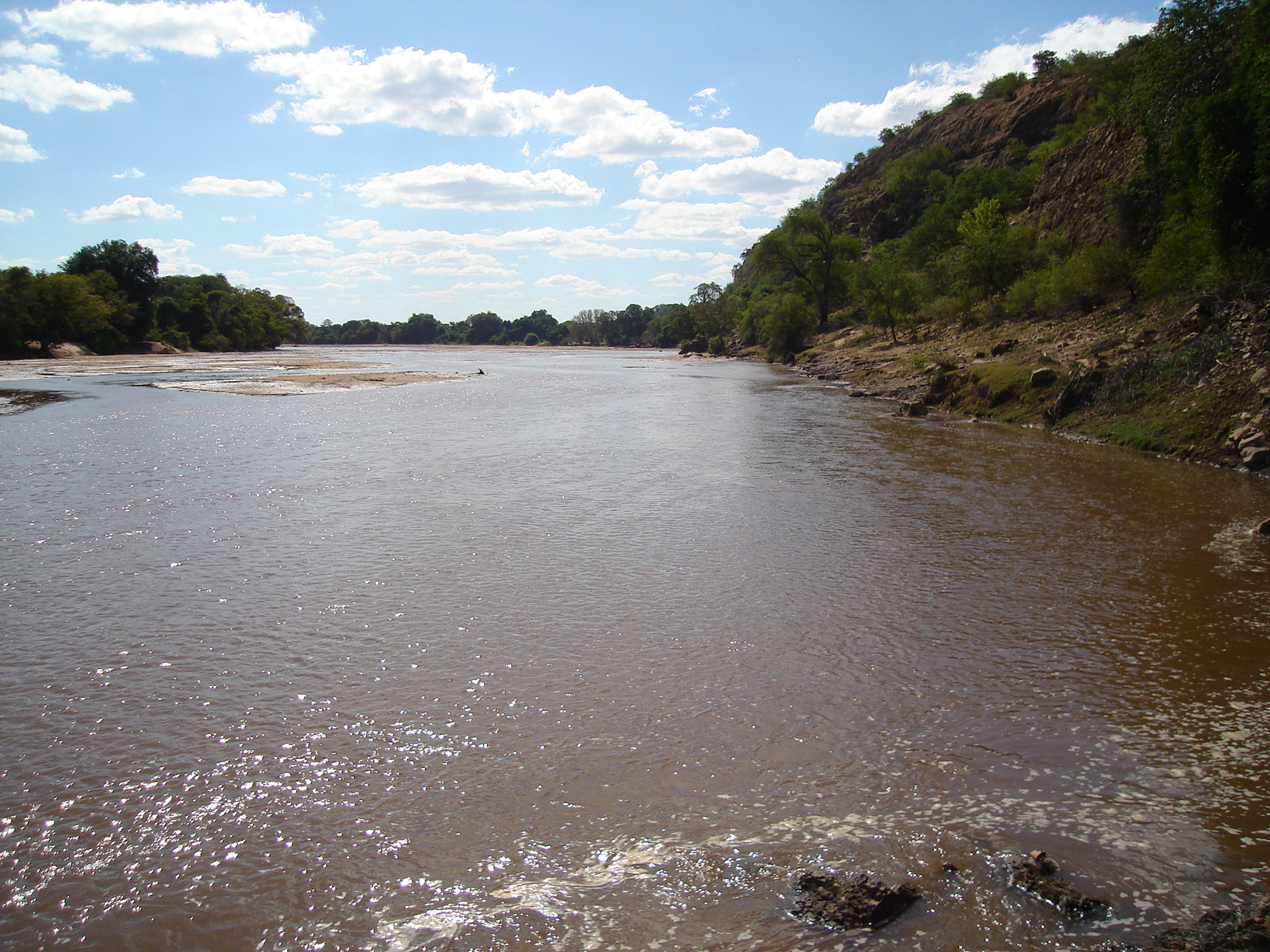
- Mzingwane River above Fulton's Drift (causeway), near Beitbridge, Zimbabwe

Location
- Country: Zimbabwe

Physical characteristics
- Source
  - location: South of Bulawayo, Zimbabwe
- Mouth
  - location: Limpopo River, South Africa–Zimbabwe border
  - coordinates: 22°11′13″S 29°55′32″E
  - elevation: 452 m (1,483 ft)
- Basin size: 15,695 km^{2} (6,060 sq mi)
- Discharge
  - average: 22.30 m^{3}/s (788 cu ft/s)

Location of the Mzingwane River's mouth

The Mzingwane River, formerly known as Umzingwane River or Umzingwani River, is a major left-bank tributary of the Limpopo River in Zimbabwe. It rises near Fort Usher, Matobo District, south of Bulawayo and flows into the Limpopo River near Beitbridge, downstream of the mouth of the Shashe River and upstream of the mouth of the Bubye River.

== Hydrology ==
The Mzingwane River is an ephemeral river with flow generally restricted to the months when rain takes place (November to March), with most flow recorded between December and February, except where it has been modified by dam operations. The river contributes 9.3% of the mean annual runoff of the Limpopo Basin, making it the third largest tributary to the Limpopo basin.

Major tributaries of the Mzingwane River include the Insiza, Inyankuni, Ncema, Umchabezi (not to be confused with Mtshabezi) and Mtetengwe Rivers.

The lower Mzingwane River is a sand filled channel, with extensive alluvial aquifers in the river channel and below the alluvial plains. Estimated water resources potential of these aquifers ranges between 175,000 and 5,430,000 cubic metres (6,200,000 and 191,800,000 cu ft) in the channels and between 80,000 and 6,920,000 cubic metres (2,800,000 and 244,400,000 cu ft) in the plains. Currently, some of these aquifers are being used to provide water for domestic use, livestock watering and dip tanks, commercial irrigation and market gardening.

== Settlements ==
The settlements below are ordered from the beginning of the river to its end:

- Mbalabala village
- Gwanda town
- West Nicholson village
- Beitbridge town is located about 6 km ESE of the confluence of the Bubye River and the Limpopo on the border with South Africa. It was established in 1929.

== Bridges and crossings ==
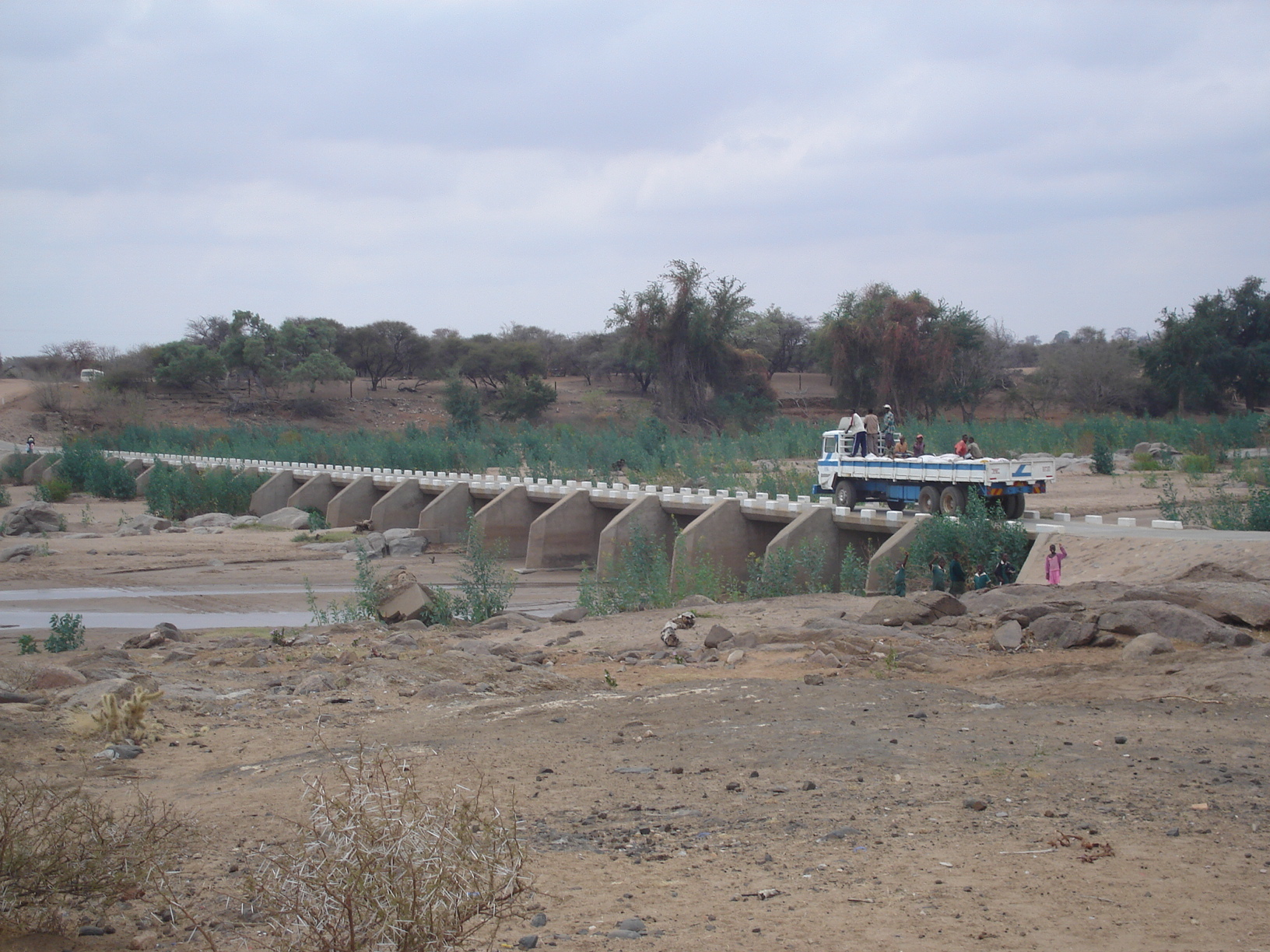
Bertie Knott Bridge on the Mzingwane River near Beitbridge.

There are four main bridges over the Mzingwane River:

- Bridge on main Bulawayo - Beitbridge road, between Esigodini and Mbalabala, downstream of Mzingwane Dam. There is also a rail bridge.
- Bridge on main Mbalabala - Masvingo road.
- Bridge on main Bulawayo - Beitbridge road at West Nicholson, downstream of confluence with Insiza River. There is also a rail bridge.
- Bertie Knott Bridge, on the road from Beitbridge to Shashe Irrigation Scheme, near the mouth.

There are also a number of fords, including:

- Two fords upstream of West Nicholson on Silalabuhwa and Mosholomoshe roads.
- Doddieburn ford, downstream of West Nicholson.
- Gems Drift, near Beitbridge.
- Fulton's Drift, near Beitbridge.

== Development ==
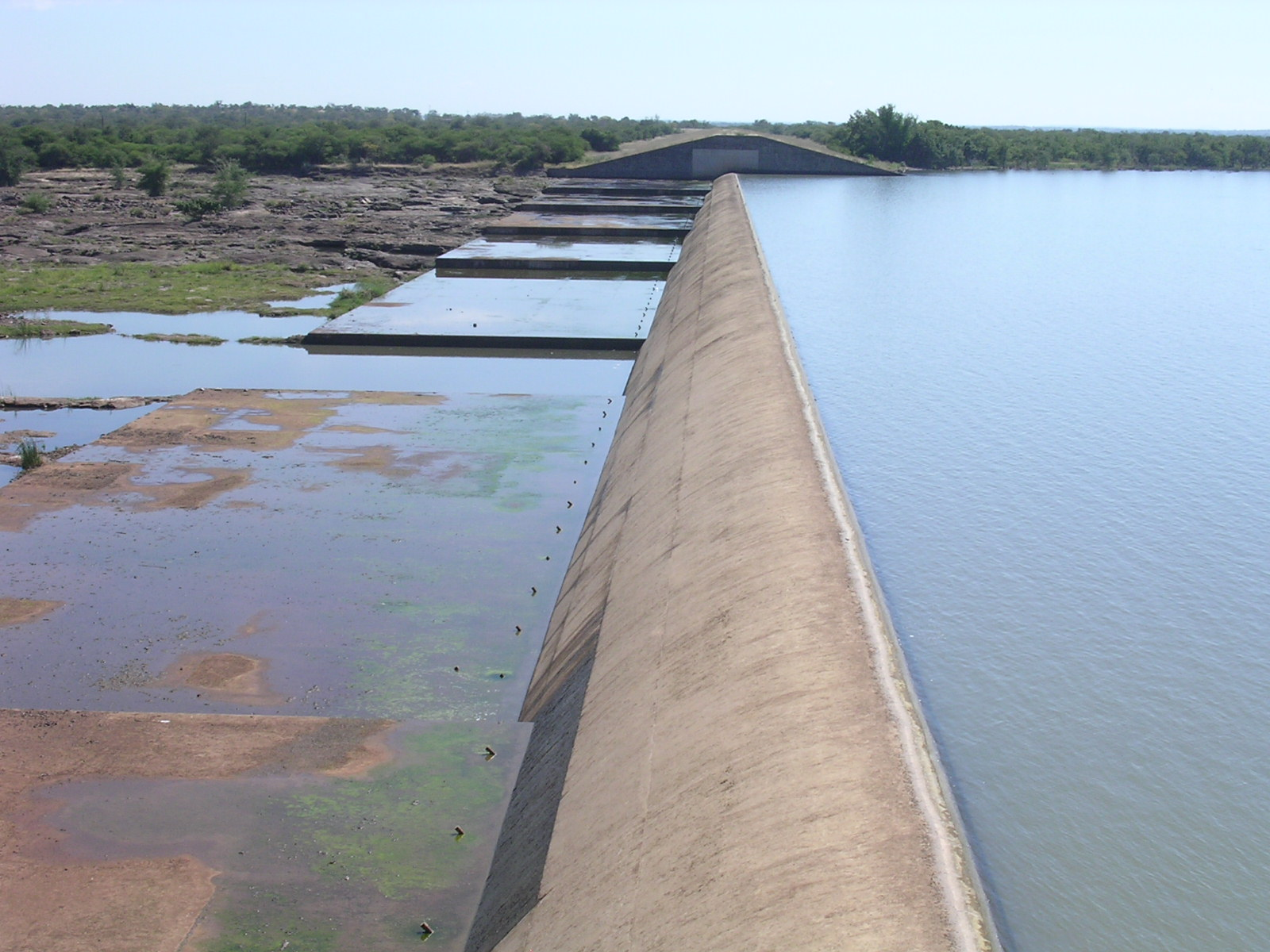
Spillway of Zhovhe Dam, near Beitbridge.

In addition to a number of small weirs, there are two major dams on the Mzingwane River:

- Mzingwane Dam, built in 1962, with a full supply capacity of 42 MCM (million cubic metres). It is located near the source of the river and supplies water to the city of Bulawayo.
- Zhovhe Dam, built in 1995, with a full supply capacity of 136 MCM. It is located near the confluence with the Limpopo River and supplies water for irrigation to Beitbridge

Additional dam sites have been identified at Glassblock and Oakley Block, but development is not currently scheduled.

A project is underway to construct a pipeline from the upper Mtshabezi River (not to be confused with Umchabezi River) to Mzingwane Dam.
