= Oakley Block Dam =

Coordinates: 21°14′48″S 29°20′19″E

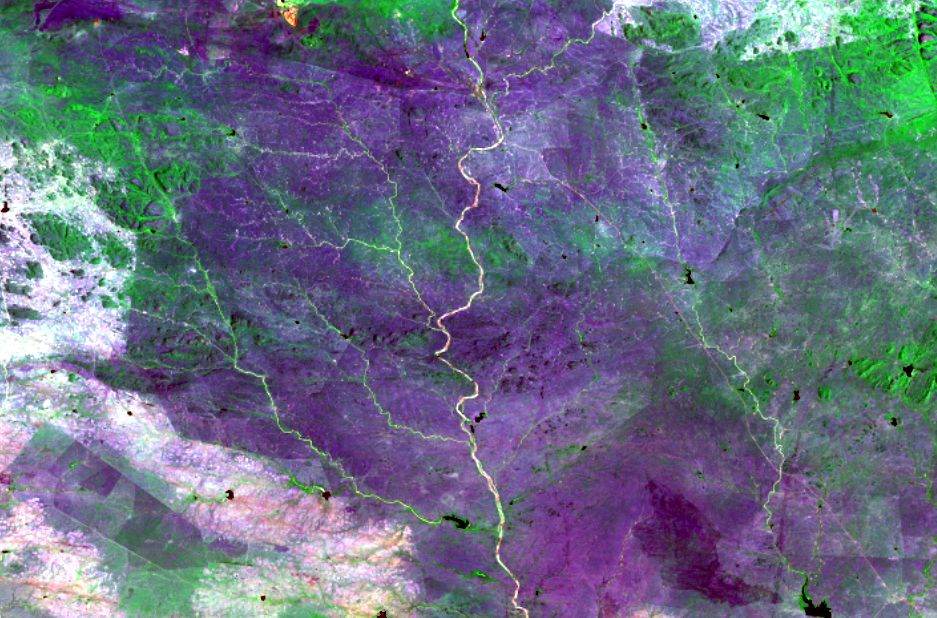
False colour composite satellite image showing the middle Mzingwane River. The site for Oakley Block Dam is the mountains in the centre of the image.

Oakley Block Dam is a proposed reservoir on the Mzingwane River, south of West Nicholson, Zimbabwe with a capacity of 41 million cubic metres.
