= Mtshabezi Dam =

Dam in Zimbabwe

- Location in Zimbabwe
- Country: Zimbabwe
- Location: Zimbabwe
- Coordinates: 20°34′20″S 28°50′29″E
- Purpose: Water supply
- Status: Complete
- Opening date: 1997

Dam and spillways
- Impounds: Mtshabezi River

Reservoir
- Total capacity: 11.4 m^{3} (400 cu ft) (11.4 million m³)

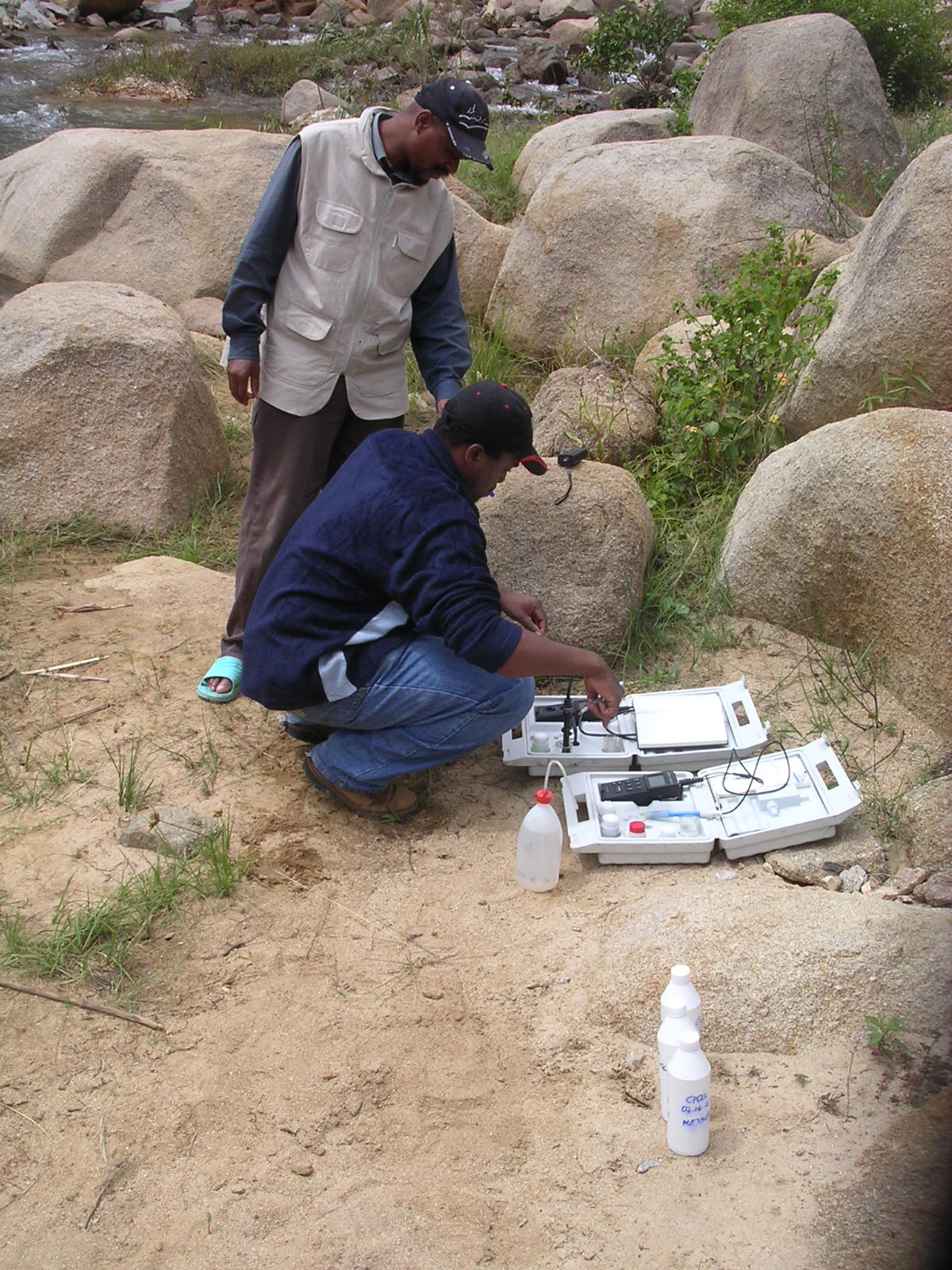
University of Zimbabwe research students sampling water near Mtshabezi Dam

Mtshabezi Dam is a reservoir on the Mtshabezi River, Zimbabwe, with a capacity of 11.4 million cubic metres. After the completion and commissioning of a pipeline linking it to Mzingwane Dam in 2013, Mtshabezi became the sixth dam supplying water to the city of Bulawayo.
