= Tullis =

Tullis is both a surname and a given name. Notable people with the name include:

- Bobby Tullis (born 1950/51), American politician
- Dan Tullis Jr. (born 1951), American actor
- Edward Lewis Tullis (1917–2005), American Bishop of the United Methodist Church
- Florence Tullis (1936–2006), American mother of Rocky Dennis
- Floyd LaMond Tullis (born 1935), American professor of political science
- Garner Handy Tullis (1939–2019), American artist
- Jan Tullis (1943–2024), American structural geologist
- Jillian A. Tullis (born 1977), American professor of communication studies
- Jim Tullis (1941–2017), American politician
- Julie Tullis (1939–1986), British climber and film-maker
- Phallon Tullis-Joyce (born 1996), American soccer player
- Pierre Tullis (born 1964), South African cricketer
- Walter Tullis (born 1953), American football wide receiver
- Willie James Tullis (born 1958), American football defensive back
- Tullis Onstott (1955–2021), American professor of geosciences

== See also ==
- Tulli, a surname
- Tullis Russell, British paper manufacturing company
- Tullis-Toledano Manor, red clay brick mansion, Biloxi
