= Mbalabala =

Mbalabala Balla Balla
- Village
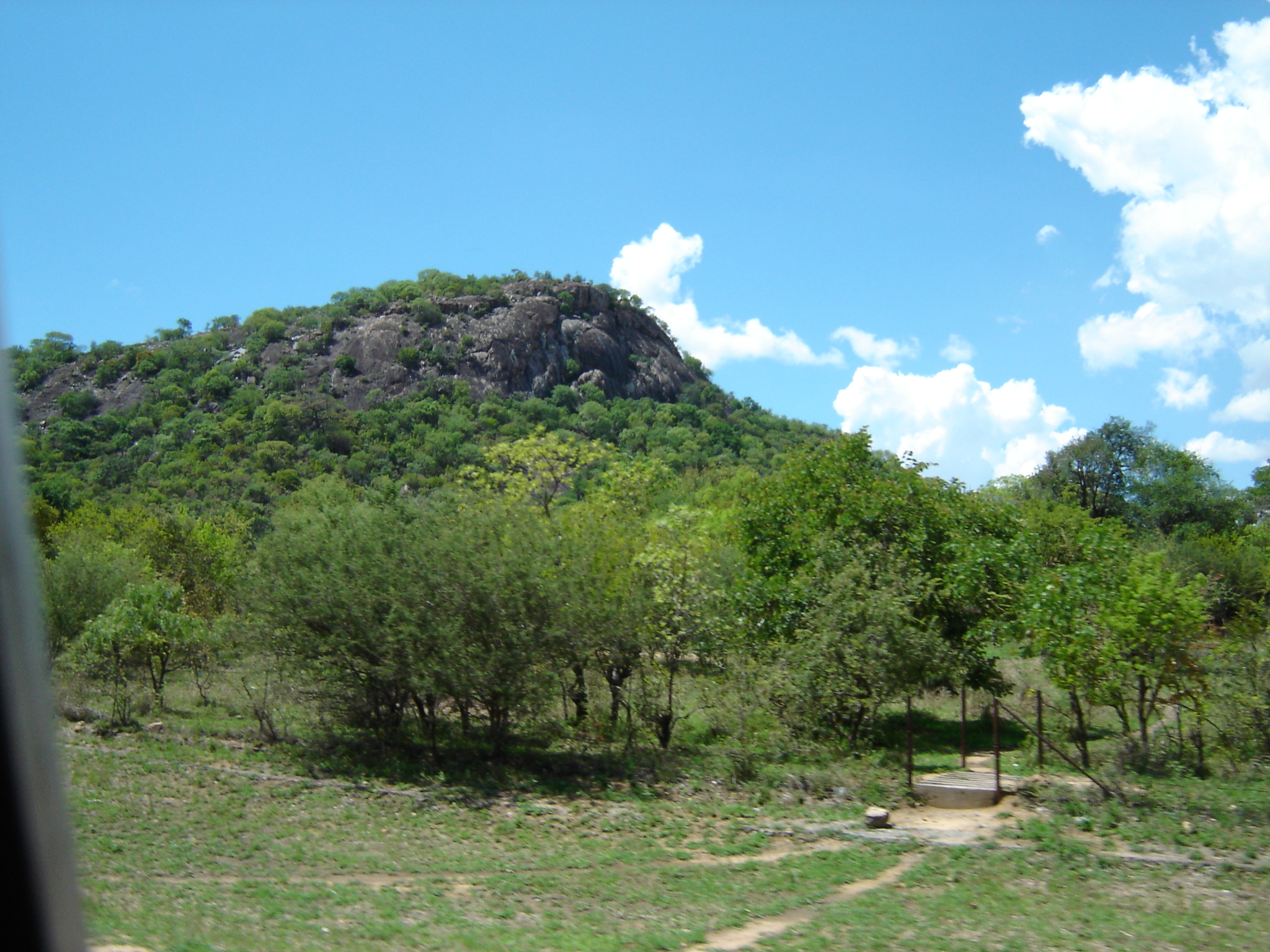
- Granite koppie near Mbalabala.

- Location of Mbalabala
- Coordinates: 20.45°S 29.03°E
- Country: Zimbabwe
- Region: Matabeleland

Mbalabala, originally known as Balla Balla, is a village on the main Beitbridge-Bulawayo road in uMzingwane district(at the junction with the Filabusi Road) in Matabeleland South providence, Zimbabwe. Situated approximately 41 miles (66 km) south-east of the city of Bulawayo. The name is derived from the Ndebele name for the greater kudu, ibhalabhala. It was originally rendered Balla Balla by Europeans, which was altered to its present name in 1982 by the Zimbabwean government in order to coincide closer with the local orthography.

The village has a railway station on the Beitbridge Bulawayo Railway and is the railhead for the mining area of Filabusi. The village also hosts a large army barracks, which is the Zimbabwe School of Infantry, formerly Shaw Barracks for the Rhodesian African Rifles from 1976 to 1980. The site was previously St. Stephen's College from February 1959 to December 1975.

Mbalabala is situated on high ground, which forms a ridge between the Mzingwane and Mbilambowe watersheds, in an important cattle ranching area with a history of gold prospecting. There is a prominent landmark nearby in the form of a granite hill (kopje) known as Balloon Kop or "Baldy" - due to its bare rock.
