= Gwenoro Dam =

Dam in Zimbabwe

Coordinates: 19°46′02″S 29°52′32″E

- Interactive map of Gwenoro Dam
- Country: Zimbabwe

The Gwenoro Dam is located inside Gwenoro Farm, an estate formerly owned by Ian Douglas Smith (1919-2007), a former Prime Minister of Rhodesia. The farm was seized in stages by the Government of Zimbabwe from Ian Smith and his family between 2002 and December 2012. The Gwenoro Dam supplies water to nearby Gweru and Shurugwi in Zimbabwe. The dam is constructed on the Runde River (formerly Lundi River; a medium density suburb in Gweru is named after the river (Lundi Park)). The name Gwenoro is derived from a wild animal found in the area known in the local language of Shona as Nhoro (gweNORO), which means a 'place inhabited by Nhoro'(kudu). The area is very beautiful and picturesque. The dam is full from January to June. Fish co-operatives are sprouting around the banks of this river. ZIMASCO used to run a mine club but has since stopped. What remains are only buildings.
