= Zhovhe Dam =

Reservoir on the Mzingwane River, Zimbabwe

Coordinates: 21°50′31″S 29°43′42″E

Zhovhe Dam is a reservoir on the Mzingwane River, Zimbabwe with a capacity of 133 million cubic metres. It supplies water for commercial irrigation and the town of Beitbridge.

== Development ==
Zhovhe Dam lies in Beitbridge area east of Beitbridge Bulawayo highway in Zimbabwe`s Region 5. The dam is among the biggest 10 dams in the country and has turned the dry area into a green belt through irrigation projects. The dam also hosts a 30-room lodge that accommodates up to 100 people.
