= Thuli–Makwe Dam =

Dam in Gwanda, Zimbabwe

Coordinates: 20°57′22″S 28°48′23″E

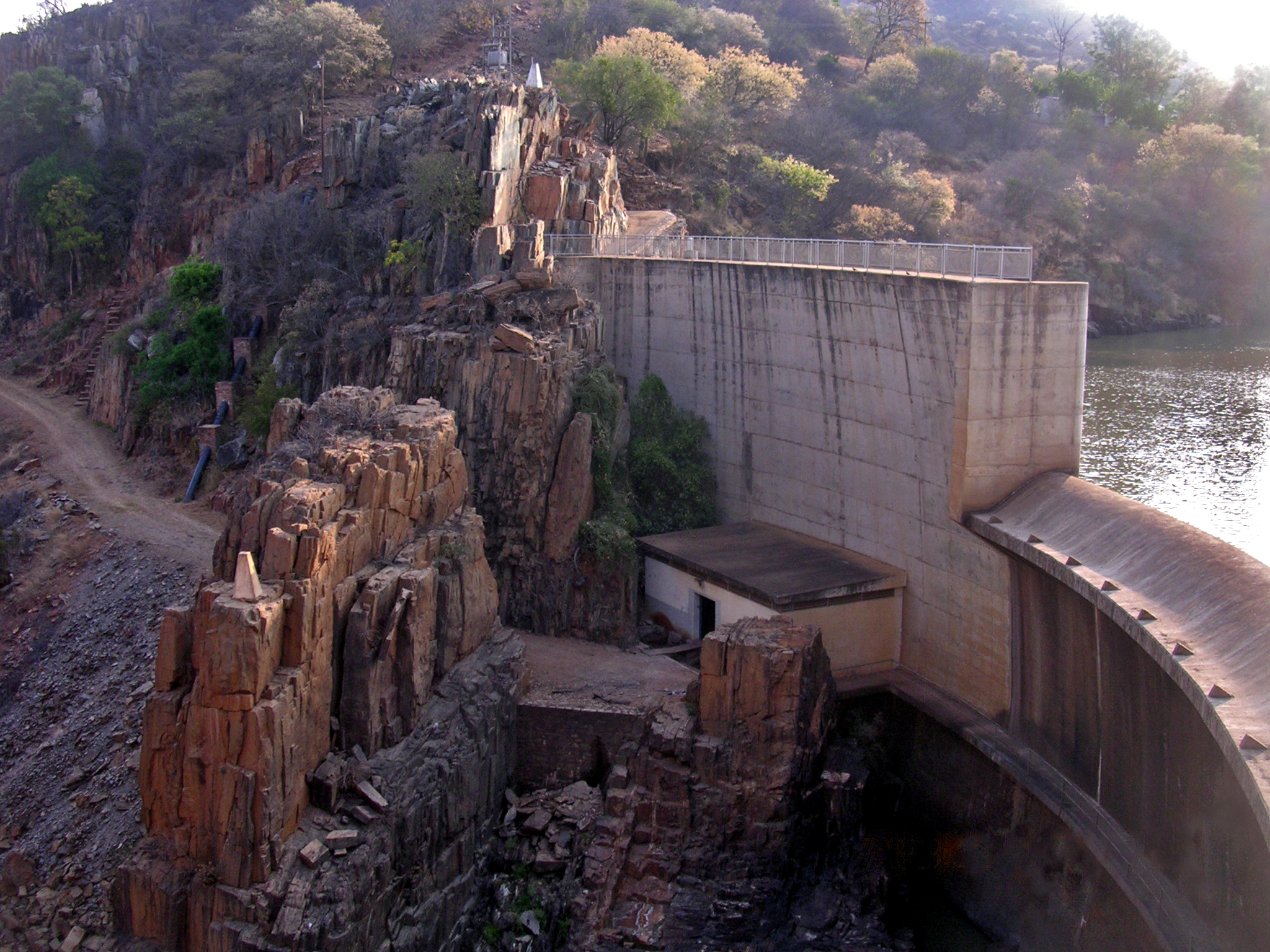
Thuli–Makwe Dam

Thuli–Makwe Dam is a reservoir on the Thuli River, west of Gwanda, in southwestern Zimbabwe. The dam has the capacity to hold 8.3 million cubic metres.
