= Mtshabezi River =

River in southern Zimbabwe

Coordinates: 21°01′34″S 28°50′55″E

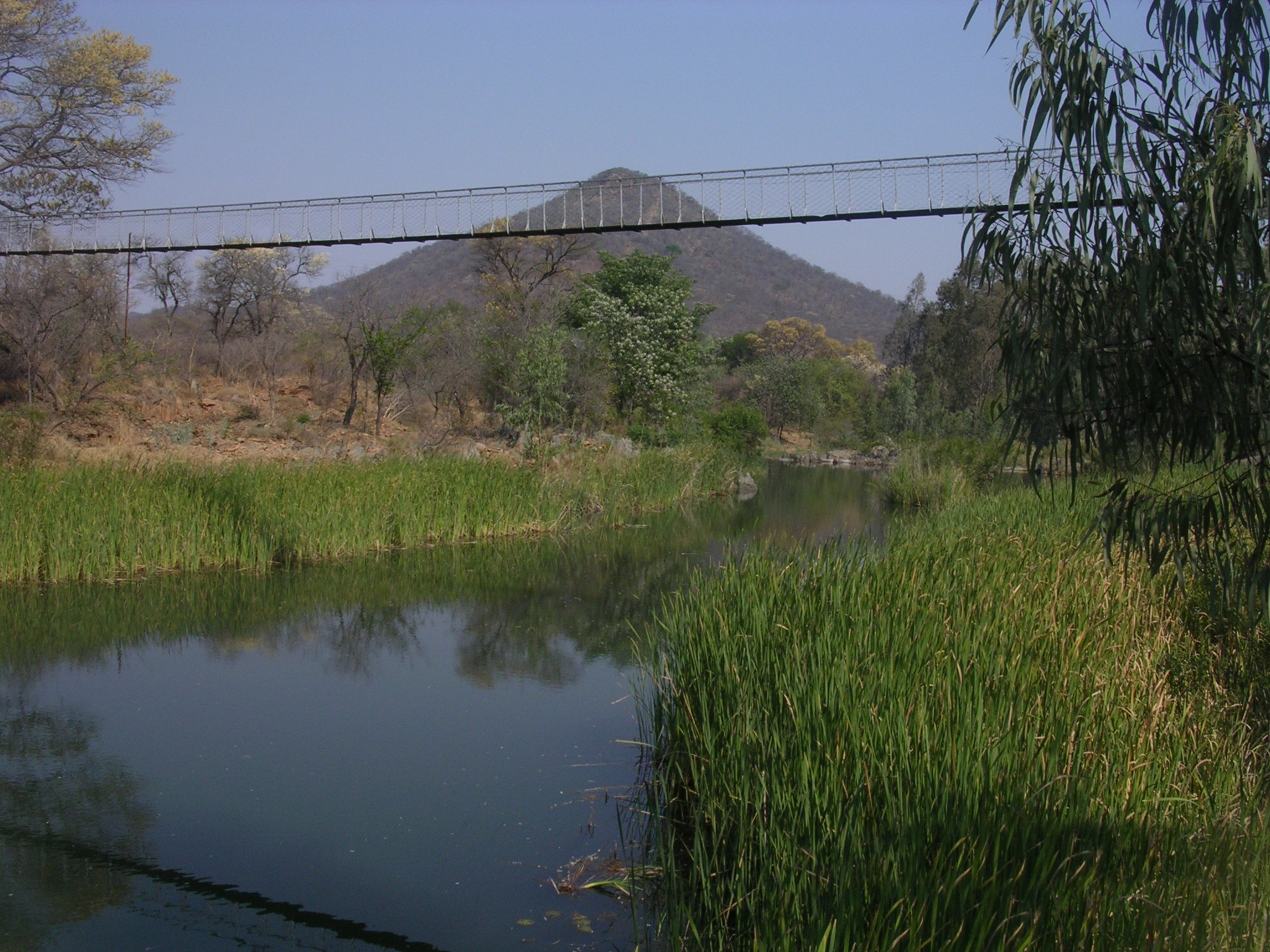
The Mtshabezi River as it flows through Gwanda.

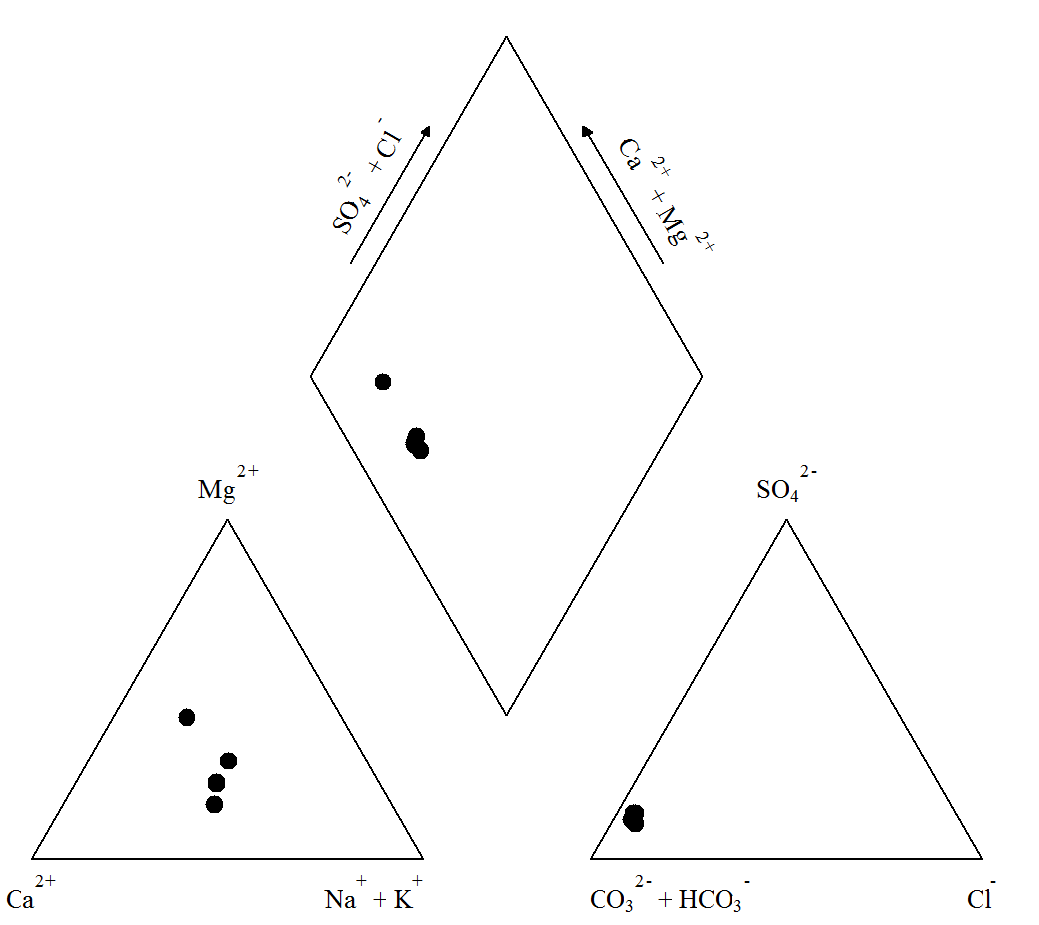
Piper diagram showing the water chemistry of samples from the Mtshabezi River in 2006. The river chemistry is dominated by carbonates.

The Mtshabezi River is a river in southern Zimbabwe and a tributary of the Thuli River. The river originates in the Matobo Hills (also known as Matopos Hills), an area characterised by granite kopjes and wooded valleys located approximately 35 kilometres (22 mi) south of Bulawayo.

The Mtshabezi River flows through the Gwanda area and contributes to the local water resources of southern Zimbabwe. Its waters supply the Mtshabezi Dam, a major water infrastructure project that provides additional water resources for Bulawayo, the second-largest city in Zimbabwe.

Studies of water quality in the Mtshabezi River have examined its chemical characteristics as part of wider research into the Mzingwane and Thuli River catchments. Water samples collected in 2006 indicated that carbonate chemistry was a dominant feature of the river water.

== See also ==
- Thuli River
- Mzingwane River
- List of rivers of Zimbabwe
