= Tokwane River =

River in Zimbabwe

Coordinates: 19°49′S 30°20′E

The Tokwane River is a river in southeastern Zimbabwe. It is a major tributary of the Tokwe River. In 1991, Hippo Valley and Triangle built a canal and barrage on the river to the south of Masvingo to augment the water supplies for the region.
