= Kezi, Zimbabwe =

Kezi
- Village
- Motto: Wamukelekile Ezintabeni
- Location within Zimbabwe
- Coordinates: 20°55′S 28°28′E
- Country: Zimbabwe
- Province: Matabeleland South
- Founded: 1896
- Elevation: 970 m (3,180 ft)

Population (2020)
  - Total: 15,000
- Time zone: UTC+2 (CAT)
- Climate: BSh

Kezi is a village in Matobo District, Matabeleland South province in Zimbabwe. It is located 100 km (62 mi) south of Bulawayo, 10 km (6.2 mi) from Maphisa, a small town which serves as the seat of Matobo District, and 76 km (47 mi) from the province's capital Gwanda.
