= Bangala Dam =

Dam in Zimbabwe

- Official name: Bangala Dam
- Location: Triangle, Zimbabwe
- Coordinates: 20.6947°S 31.2327°E
- Construction began: 1961-1963

Dam and spillways
- Impounds: Mutirikwe River
- Spillway type: Overflow crest

Reservoir
- Total capacity: 126.6 million cubic metres
- Catchment area: 5830 km²
- Surface area: 1130 ha
- Maximum water depth: 45 metres
- Discharge capacity: 3510 m³/s Max Water Depth: 45 metres

Bangala Dam lies in south-eastern Zimbabwe, south of Masvingo. It was built by Concor to provide irrigation water to the farming estates on the lowveld to the southwest, around the town of Triangle, where the main crop has been sugar cane.

The lake and environs are protected as Bangala Dam Recreational Park.
