= Tokwe Mukosi Dam =

- Location within Zimbabwe
- Official name: Tugwi Mukosi Dam
- Country: Zimbabwe
- Location: close to Ngundu, Masvingo Province
- Coordinates: 21°03′46.25″S 30°23′39.99″E
- Purpose: Water storage, flood control, irrigation, fisheries, power
- Status: Operational
- Construction began: 1998
- Opening date: 2016
- Construction cost: US$200 million

Dam and spillways
- Type of dam: Embankment, concrete-face rock-fill
- Impounds: Tokwe River
- Height: 90.3 m (296 ft)
- Width (crest): 8.5 m (28 ft)
- Dam volume: 1,915,000 m^{3} (67,600,000 cu ft)

Reservoir
- Total capacity: 1,750×10^{6} m^{3} (1,420,000 acre⋅ft)
- Catchment area: 7,120 km^{2} (2,750 sq mi)
- Surface area: 96.4 km^{2} (37.2 sq mi)
- Maximum water depth: 82.7 m (271 ft)

Power Station
- Commission date: May 2017
- Installed capacity: 12 MW (16,000 hp)

The Tokwe Mukosi Dam or Tugwi Mukosi Dam is a concrete-face rock-fill dam on the Tokwe River, just downstream of its confluence with the Mukosi River, about 72 kilometres (45 mi) south of Masvingo in Masvingo Province, Zimbabwe. It is 90.3 metres (296 ft) tall and creates a 1,750,000,000 m^{3} (1,420,000 acre⋅ft) reservoir, the largest inland dam in the country. The associated hydroelectric power station has a 12 megawatts (16,000 hp) installed capacity.

Construction on the dam began in June 1998 but stalled in 2008. Salini Impregilo began to finish the dam in 2011. Heavy flooding in February 2014 caused a partial failure on 4 February, on the downstream face of the dam. By late February the dam had not been fully breached but the unplanned rising reservoir behind the dam caused evacuations upstream. Both upstream and downstream, over 20,000 people were evacuated. Construction of the dam was suspended in June 2014 due to a lack of funding. In May 2016 the government released $35 million to Salini Impregilio to enable the Italian contractor resume construction work that stopped two years ago owing to payment problems. The Dam was eventually completed in December 2016 and commissioned in May 2017.

== Gallery ==
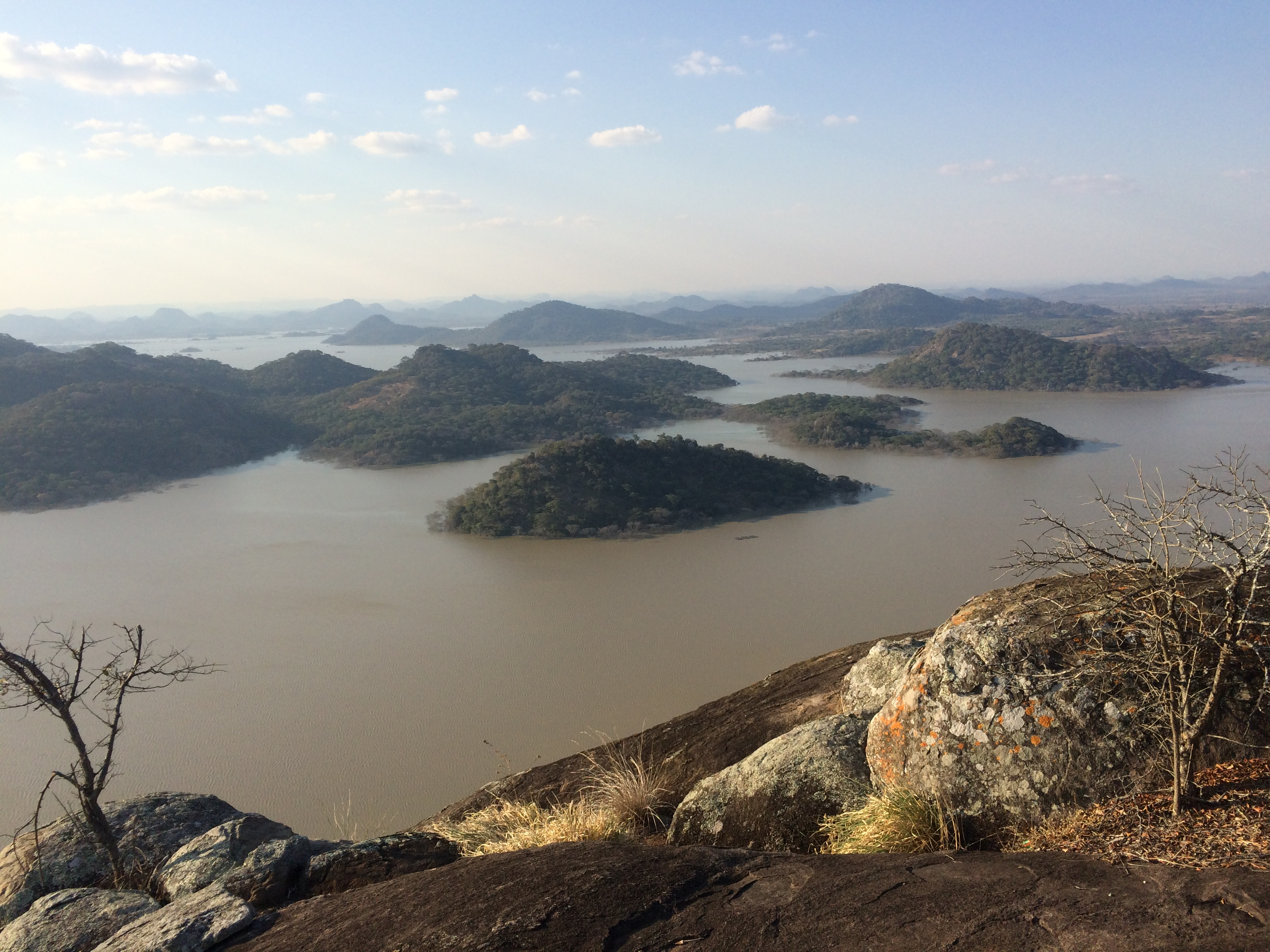

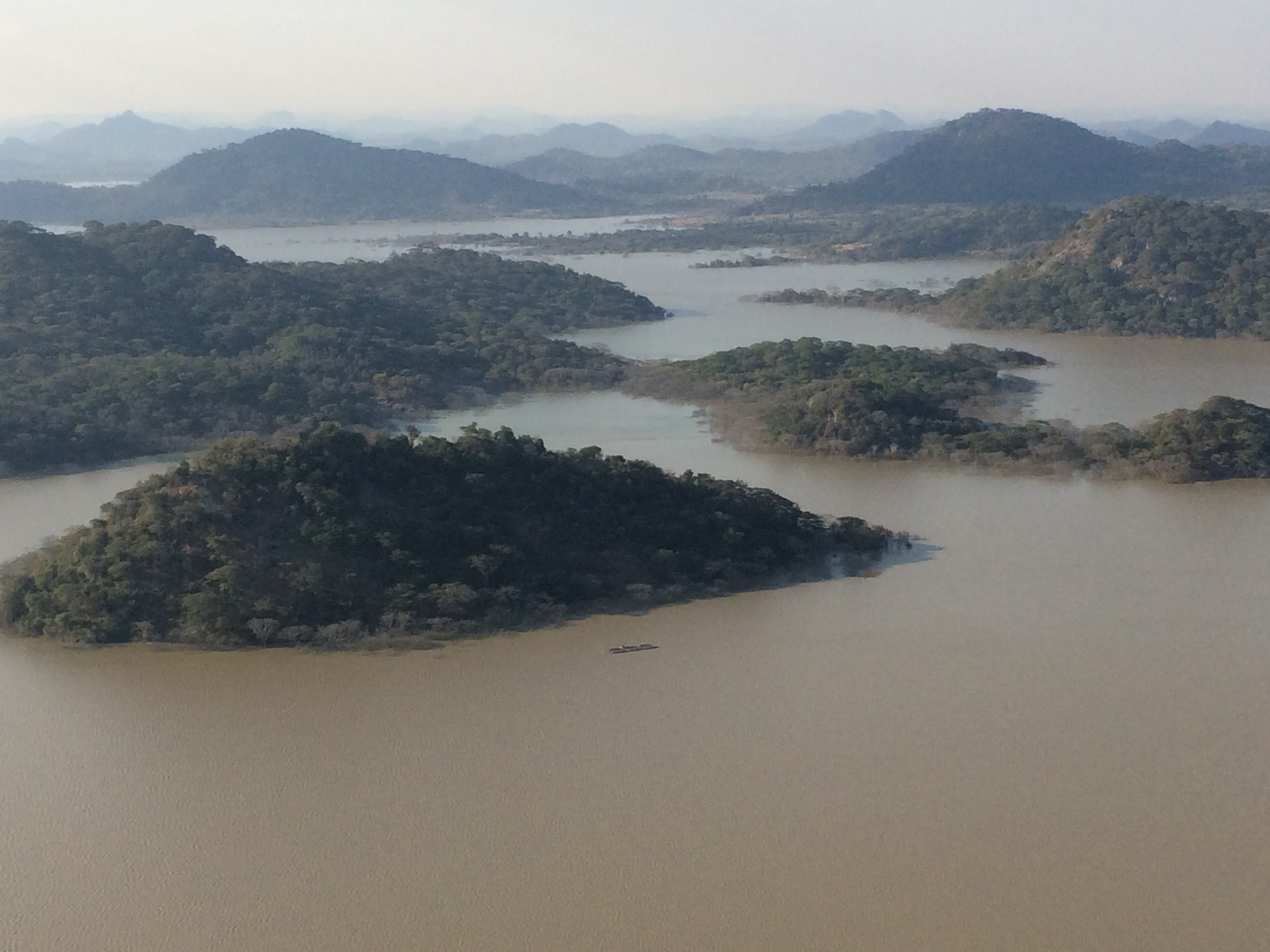
Water has not settled as yet.

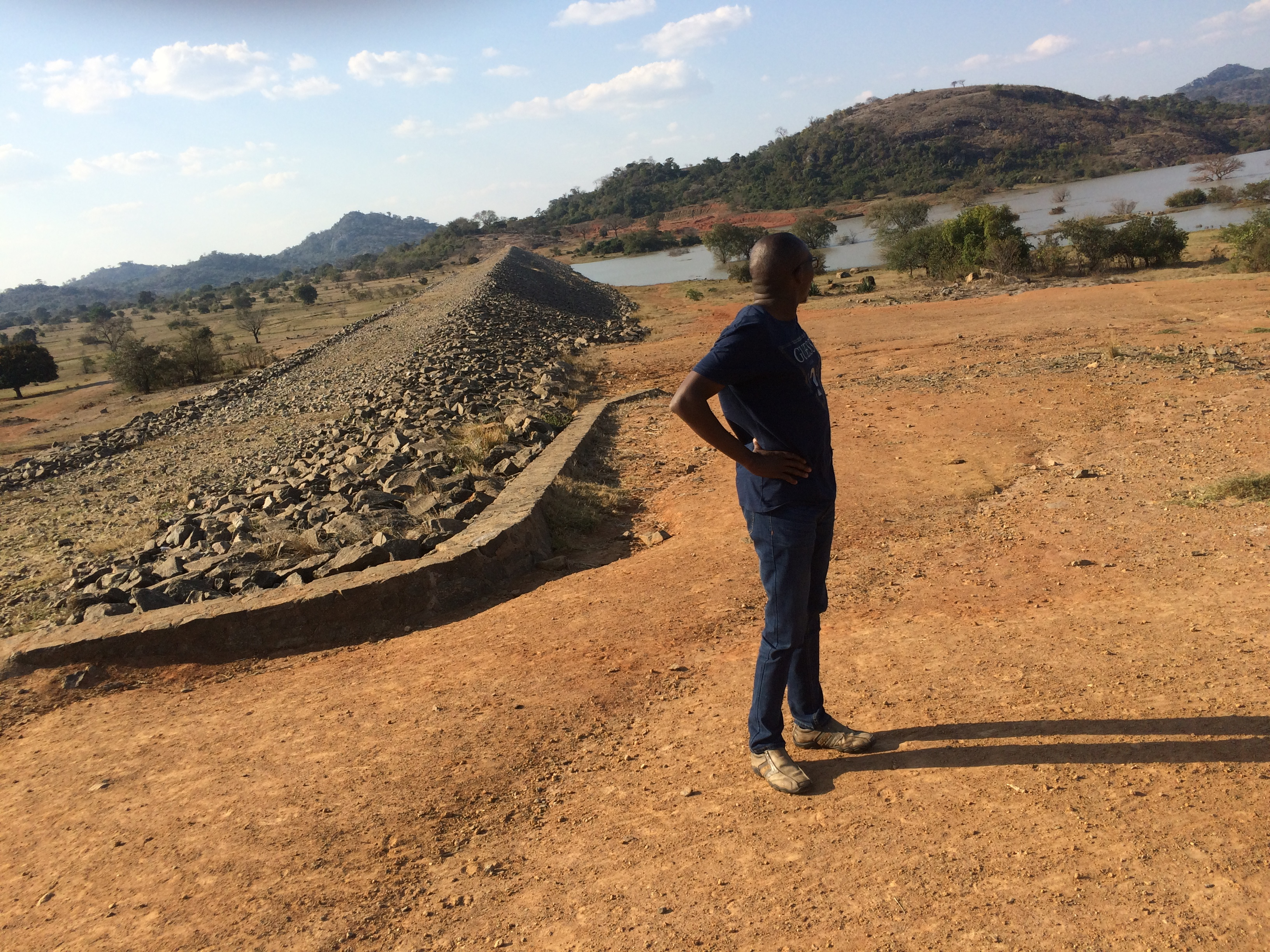

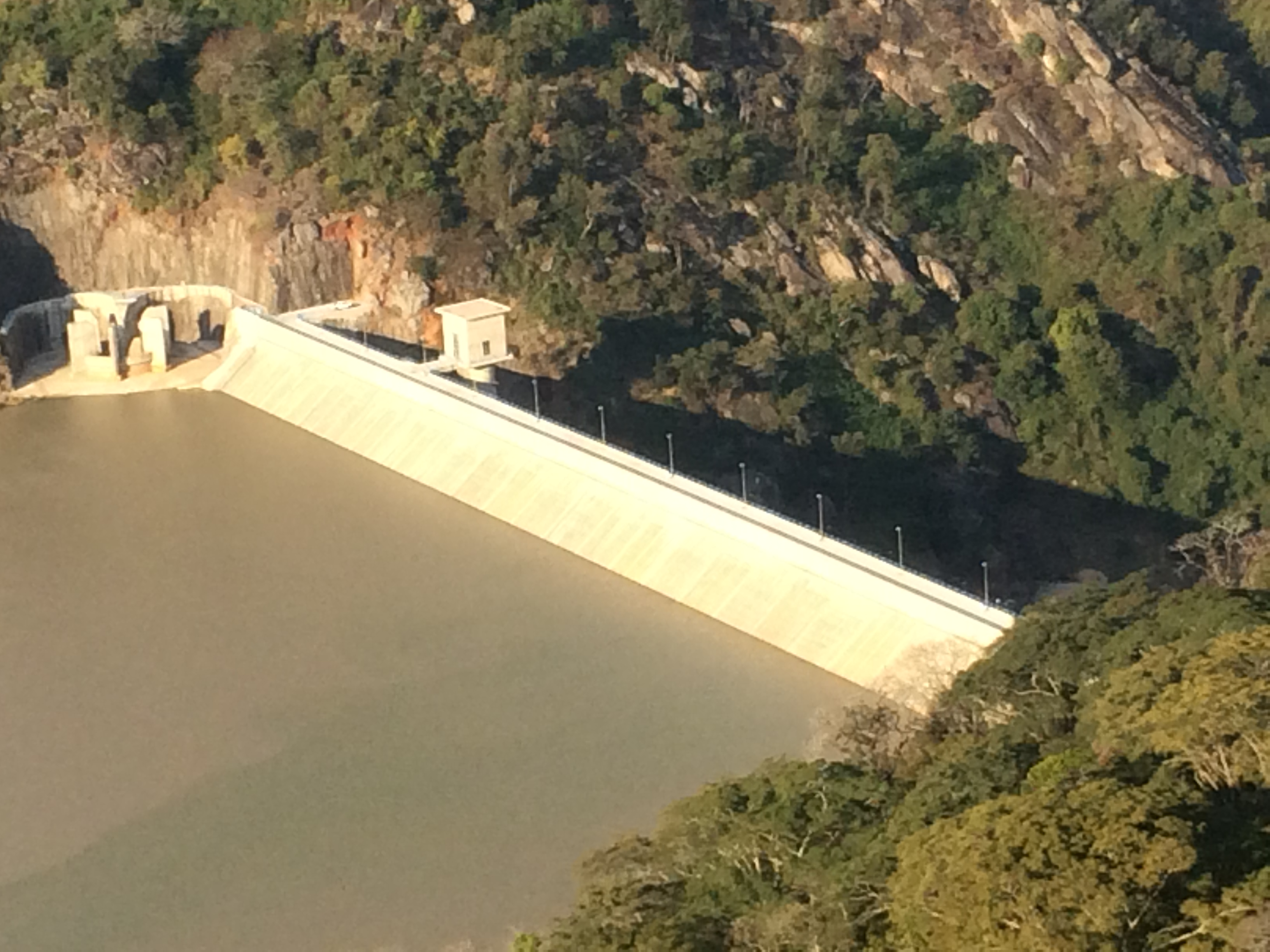
Looking east you can get the best view of the dam.
