= Thulasi =

Tulasi may refer to:

- Tulasi in Hinduism, a sacred plant in Hindu tradition, regarded as an earthly manifestation of the goddess Tulasi
- Tulasi or Ocimum tenuiflorum, an aromatic plant in the family Lamiaceae

Thulasi or Tulasi may also refer to:

== Films ==
- Thulasi (1976 film), an Indian Kannada film
- Thulasi (1987 film), a Tamil film starring Murali and Seetha
- Tulasi (1974 film), a Telugu film starring Krishnam Raju and Kalpana
- Tulasi (2007 film), an Indian film by Boyapati Srinu

== People ==
- Thulasi Helen (born 1986), Indian boxer
- Thulasidas, Indian film director
- Tulasi (actress) (born 1967), Indian film actress
- Tulsidas or Tulasidas (1532–1623), Indian saint and poet

== See also ==
- Kattuthulasi, a 1965 Indian Malayalam film
- Tulsi (disambiguation)
