= Thuli–Moswa Dam =

Coordinates: 21°10′59″S 28°52′29″E

Thuli–Moswa Dam is the name for a proposed reservoir on the Thuli River, south of Gwanda, Zimbabwe which would have the capacity of 419 million cubic metres.
