= Mtshelele River =

Location
- Country: Zimbabwe

Mtshelele River is a tributary of the Thuli River in Zimbabwe.
