= Kashinath Shastri Appa Tulsi =

Musician and Sanskrit scholar

Kashinath Shastri Appa Tulasi was an Indian musician and Sanskrit scholar.

== Description ==
In 1932 about 20 years after the publication of the text Swara-^mela-kalanidhi by Vishnu Narayan Bhatkhande in Bombay, Bhatkhande met Kashinath Shastri Appa Tulsi at Hyderabad. He explained the outline of the theory of music he had formed on the basis of the practice in vogue and Appa Tulsi at once took up the ideas and adopted them with intense and eager enjoyment. When Bhatkhande sent his Shree Mallakshya Sangeetam to him, Appa Tulsi composed his own couplets of the definitions of the various Ragas explained in Lakshya Sangeetam. He wrote three pamphlets in Sanskrit, namely Sangeet Sudhakar, Sangeet Kalpadrumankur and Raga Chandrika and one in Hindi namely Raga Chandrika Sar all on the basis of the definitions of Ragas given by Bhatkhande.

== Manuscripts edited by Bhatkhande ==
1. Nartan Niranaya by Kashinath Shashtri Appa Tulsi
2. Sangeet Sudhakar by Kashinath Shashtri Appa Tulsi
3. Sangeet Kalp Drumankur by Kashinath Shashtri Appa Tulsi
4. Raga Chandrika by Kashinath Shashtri Appa Tulsi
5. Raga Chandrika Sar (Hindi)
