= Tuli (name) =

Tuli may refer to the following people:

== Given name ==
- Tuli Goon (born 1988), Indian football player
- Tuli Kupferberg (1923–2010), American counterculture poet, author, cartoonist, anarchist
- Tuli Letuligasenoa (born 2000), American football player
- Tuli Tuipulotu (born 2002), American football player

== Surname ==
- Géza Tuli (1888–1966), Hungarian Olympic gymnast
- Jake Tuli (1931–1998), South African boxer
- Madhurima Tuli (born 1986), Indian actress
- Manoj Tuli, known by his screen name Kumar Gaurav (born 1956), Indian actor
- Neville Tuli (born 1964), Indian writer, art connoisseur and founder member of the annual Osian film festival
- Rajendra Kumar Tuli (1927–1999), Indian actor
- Suneet Singh Tuli (born 1968), Canadian entrepreneur of Indian origin
- Teila Tuli, also known as Taylor Wiley, American sumo wrestler
- Uma Tuli (born 1943), Indian social worker and educationist

== See also ==
- Thuli (given name)
- Tulli, a surname
