= Mtetengwe River =

River in Zimbabwe

Coordinates: 22°00′S 29°56′E

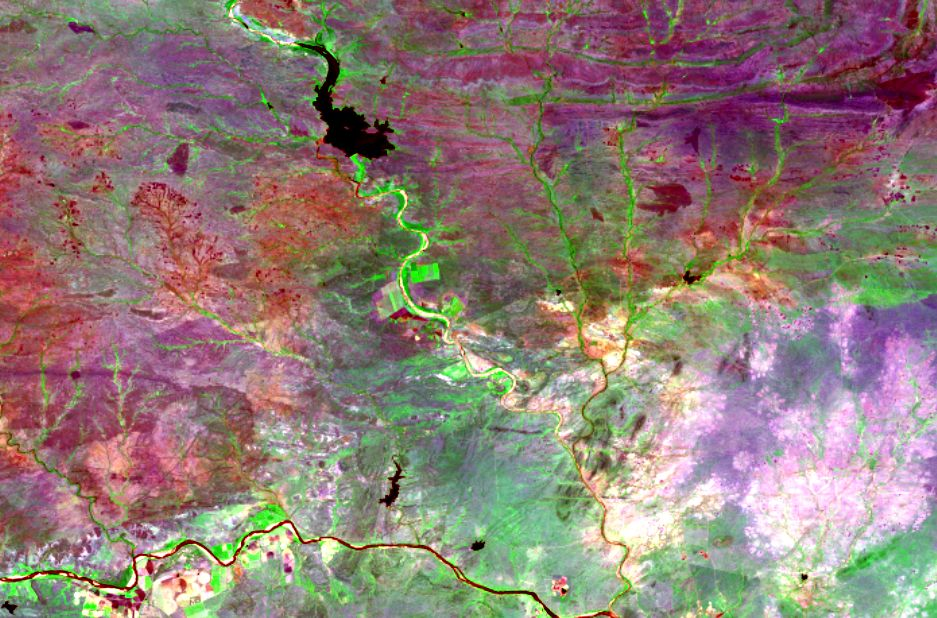
False colour composite satellite image showing the Mzingwane River in the centre and the Mtetengwe River is the last tributary that flows into that river on its east bank (right of this image).

The Mtetengwe River is a tributary of the Mzingwane River in Beitbridge District, Zimbabwe. There are two dams on its tributaries: Tongwe Dam on the Tongwe River, which provides water for an irrigation scheme, and Giraffe Dam which supplies water for cattle. Both dams were classified as silted up as of 2023.

The Mtetengwe is the last east-bank tributary to join the Mzingwane River.
