= Inyankuni River =

Location
- Country: Zimbabwe

Inyankuni River is a river in Zimbabwe. It is a tributary of the Mzingwane River. The river is impacted by illegal mining activities.
