= Tokwe River =

River in Zimbabwe

Coordinates: 21°08′S 31°16′E

The Save River basin with the Tokwe (left bottom)

The Tokwe River is a river in southeastern Zimbabwe. It is a tributary of the Runde River. Major tributaries of the Tokwe include the Tokwane River.

In February 2014, after heavy rains, the Tokwe river basin flooded. Twelve villages upstream from the Tokwe Mukorsi Dam were affected, and over 20,000 people were evacuated from the area.
