= Thuli (given name) =

Thuli is a South-African given name that may refer to

- Thuli Brilliance Makama, Eswatini environmental attorney
- Thuli Dumakude, South African-born singer-songwriter and actress
- Thuli Dladla, Eswatini politician and diplomat
- Thuli Madonsela (born 1962), South African advocate
- Thuli Qegu (born 1987), South African netball player

== See also ==
- Tuli (name)
