= Bubye River =

Bubye River (Bubi River)
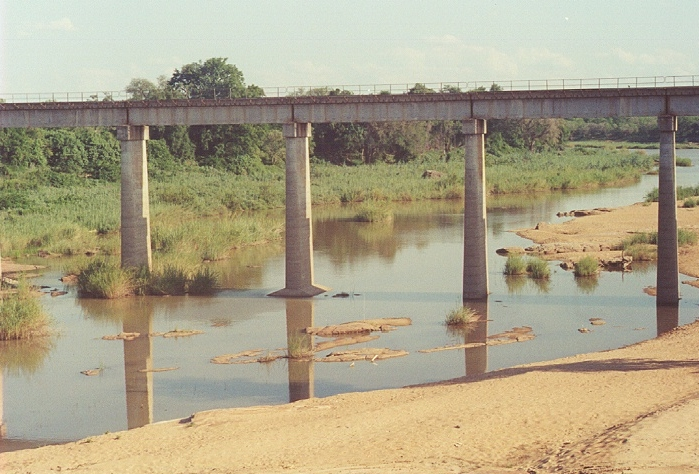
- The Bubye River from the A1, Zimbabwe

Location
- Country: Zimbabwe

Physical characteristics
- Source
  - location: east of West Nicholson, Zimbabwe
  - elevation: 235 m (771 ft)
- Mouth: Limpopo River
  - coordinates: 22°20′11″S 31°07′00″E
- Basin size: 8,140 km^{2} (3,140 sq mi)
- Discharge
  - average: 6.51 mm/a (0.256 in/year) (unit flow)

Location of the Bubye River's mouth

The Bubye River, also known as Bubi River, is a tributary of the Limpopo River in Beitbridge District and Gwanda District, Zimbabwe. It rises about 40 kilometres (25 mi) to the northeast of West Nicholson in Matabeleland South, from where it flows southeast before joining the Limpopo 25 kilometres (16 mi) west of the border with Mozambique. Its course forms part of the border between Mberengwa and Mwenezi districts.

Tigerfish occur naturally in this river.

== Dams ==
There were no major dams on the river until the Bubi-Lupane Dam was built in 2010 to supply water to Lupane District.
