= Umchabezi River =

River in Zimbabwe

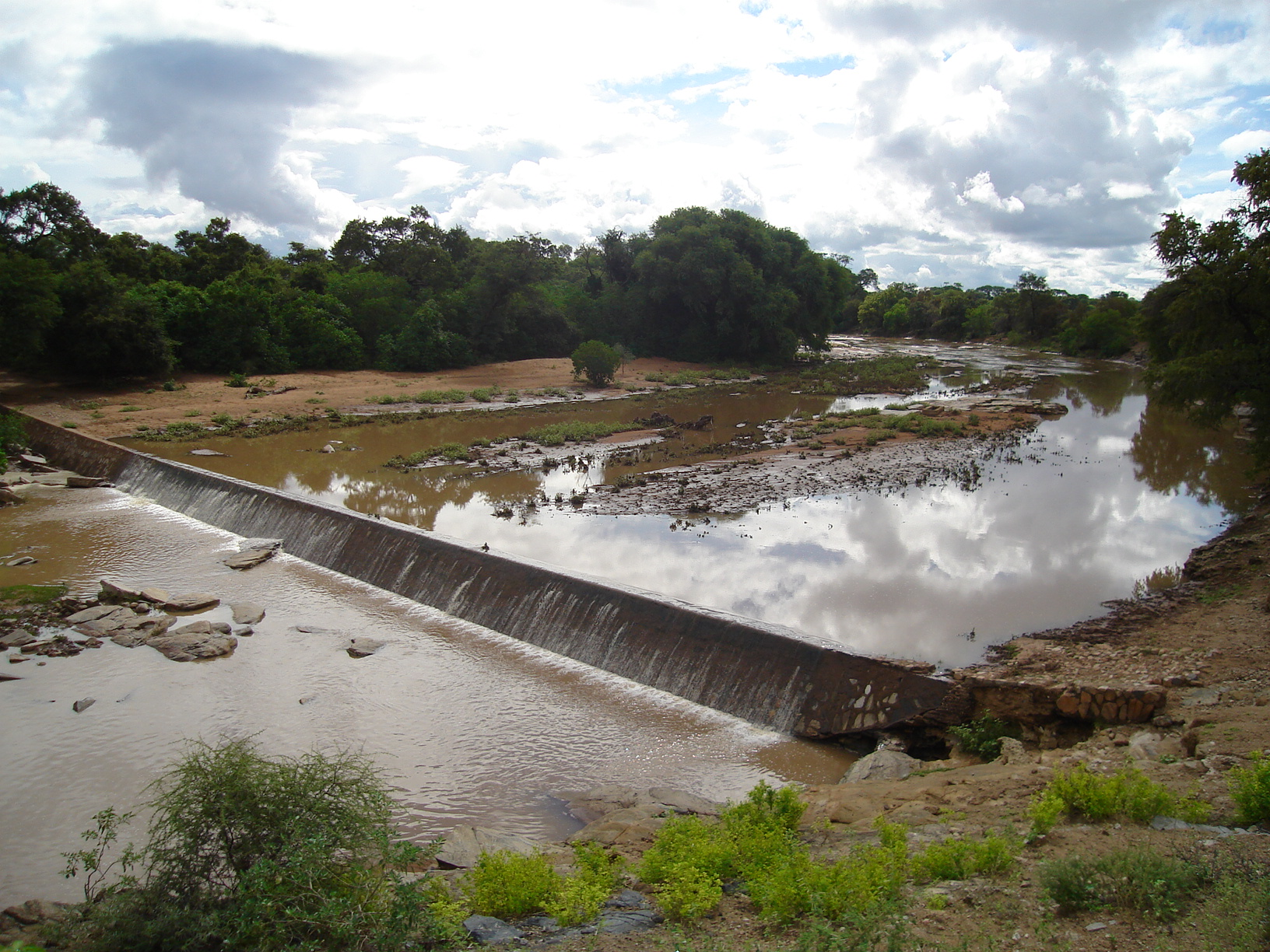
The Umchabezi River in Siyoka.

The Umchabezi River is a tributary—a small stream feeding two huge rivers; the Mzingwane River in Beitbridge District and Gwanda District, Zimbabwe. The main dam on the Umchabezi is called Makado Dam, which supplies water for commercial irrigation.
