= Mutirikwe River =

River in Zimbabwe

Coordinates: 21°09′00″S 31°29′41″E

The Save River basin with the Mutirikwe (center bottom)

The Mutirikwe River (formerly Mtilikwe River) is a river in southeastern Zimbabwe. It is a tributary of the Runde River. Major tributaries of the Mutirikwe include Pokoteke River.

The river is dammed at Lake Mutirikwe, which is recognised as an important wetland, and at Bangala Dam near Renco.
