= Ngezi River (Masvingo) =

River in Zimbabwe

Coordinates: 20°37′39″S 30°26′55″E

The Ngezi River (formerly Ingezi River) is a river in southeastern Zimbabwe. It is a tributary of the Runde River.
