= Mzingwane Dam =

Coordinates: 20°23′35″S 28°58′26″E

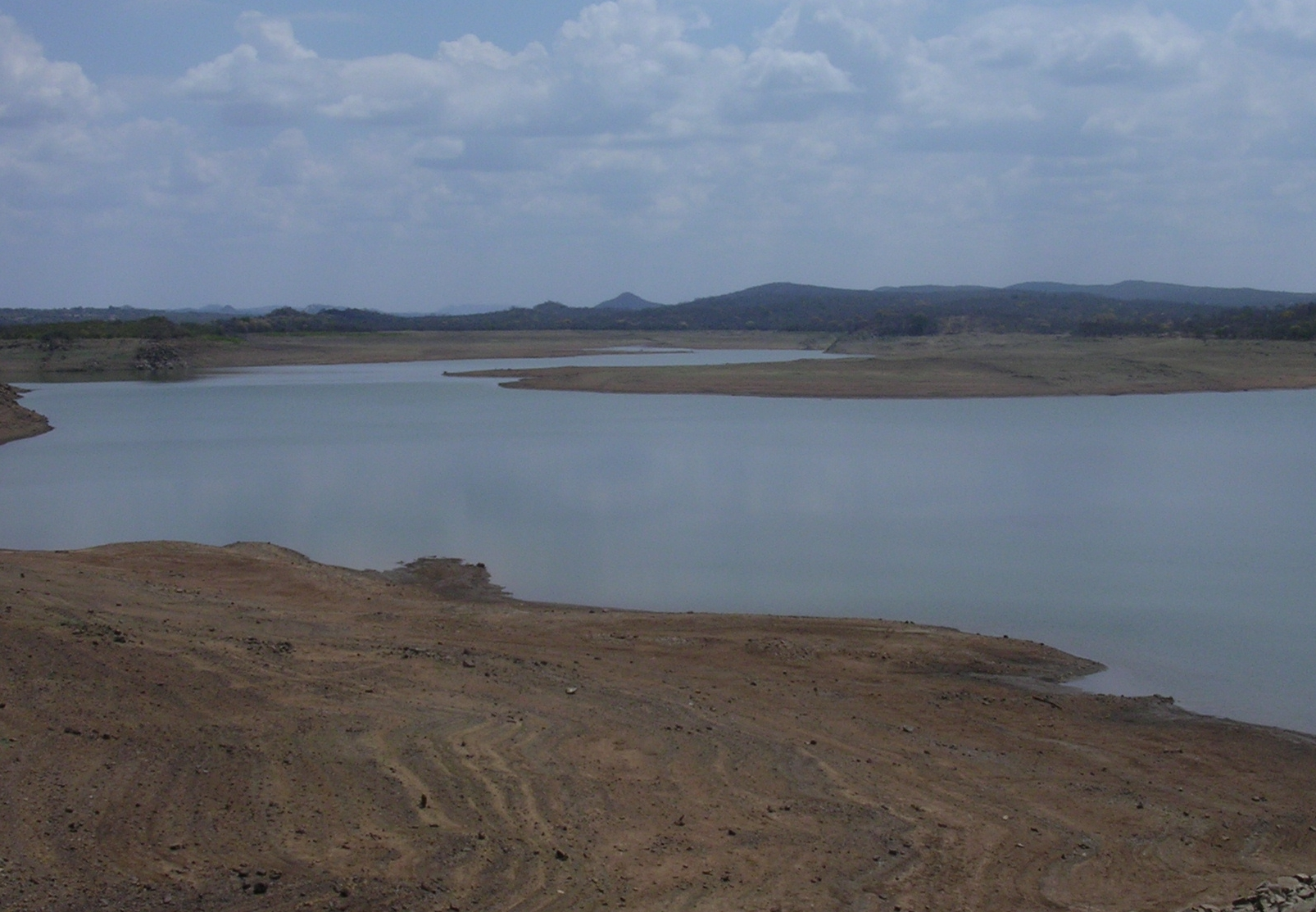
Mzingwane Dam during the dry season, 2005

Mzingwane Dam is a reservoir on the Mzingwane River, near Esigodini, Zimbabwe, with a capacity of 42 million cubic metres. It supplies water to the city of Bulawayo.
