= Ngezi River (Midlands) =

River in Zimbabwe

The Ngezi River is a river in central Zimbabwe in the Midlands province. It is a tributary of the Sanyati River, in the Zambezi River basin. It supplies water for the Munyati power station.

== See also ==
- Tributaries of the Zambezi River
