= Runde River =

River in Zimbabwe

Coordinates: 21°18′48″S 32°24′09″E

The Save River basin with the Runde (left bottom)

The Runde River (formerly Lundi River) is a river in southeastern Zimbabwe. It is a tributary of the Save River. Major tributaries of the Runde include the Ngezi River, Tokwe River, Mutirikwe River and Chiredzi River.

== Characteristics and geography ==
The lower Runde River is an ephemeral sand river system, with permanent pools forming during the dry season. The river has generally low levels of pollution. The floodplain at the confluence with the Save River is an important wetland.

== See also ==
- Chiredzi
- Wildlife of Zimbabwe
