= Ncema River =

Coordinates: 20°24′S 29°02′E

Location
- Country: Zimbabwe

Ncema River is a river in Zimbabwe. Aquatic life in the river has been negatively affected from the deposited mercury. The river has two major parts, Upper Ncema and Lower Ncema. It hosts one of the five major portable dams which were built to supply water to Bulawayo. The Ncema is a tributary of the Mzingwane River.

Ncema River
