= Tulli =

Tulli is a surname. Notable people with the surname include:

- Alessandro Tulli (born 1982), Italian footballer
- Frank Tulli (born 1944), American former Republican member of the Pennsylvania House of Representatives
- Giacomo Tulli (born 1987), Italian footballer
- Magdalena Tulli (born 1955), Polish novelist
- Marco Tulli (1920–1982), Italian character actor
- Vincent Tulli (born 1966), French sound mixer and sound designer

== See also ==
- Finnish Customs (Finnish: Tulli)
- Tuļļi Lum, Estonian/Livonian folk music band
- Tulli Papyrus, document of questionable origins that some have interpreted as evidence of ancient flying saucers
- Tullis, a surname and given name
- Tulli (district), a district in central Tampere, Finland
