= Matobo District =

Coordinates: 20°57′S 28°30′E

Matobo District Matopos District
- second-level administrative subdivision
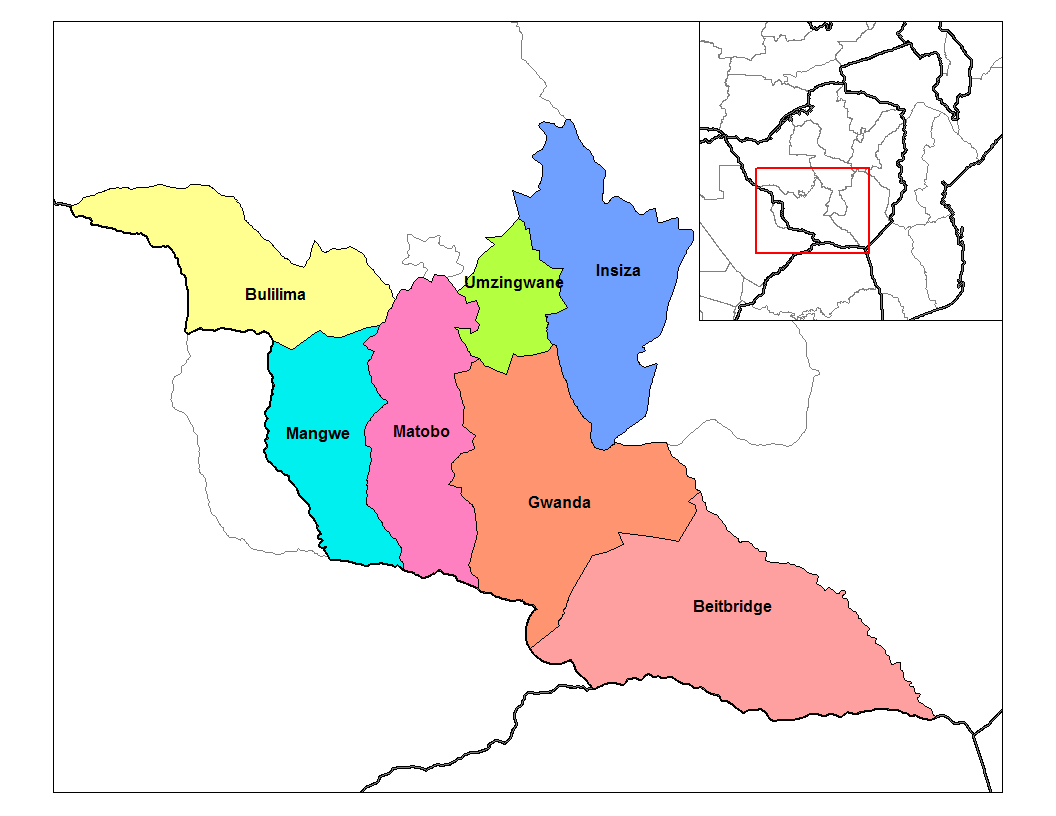
- A map of the districts of Matabeleland South
- Country: Zimbabwe
- Province: Matabeleland South

Area
  - Total: 7,245 km^{2} (2,797 sq mi)

Population (2022 census)
  - Total: 95,694
  - Density: 13.21/km^{2} (34.21/sq mi)
- Time zone: UTC+1 (CET)
  - Summer (DST): UTC+1 (CEST)

Matobo, formerly known as Matopos, is a district of the Matabeleland South province in southwestern Zimbabwe.
