= Gwanda =

Zimbabwean town

- Town
- Location in Zimbabwe
- Coordinates: 20°56′20″S 29°01′07″E
- Country: Zimbabwe
- Province: Matabeleland South
- Districts of Zimbabwe: Gwanda District
- Municipality: Municipality of Gwanda
- Elevation: 1,000 m (3,300 ft)

Population (2022 census)
  - Total: 26,700
- Time zone: UTC+2 (CAT)
- Climate: BSh

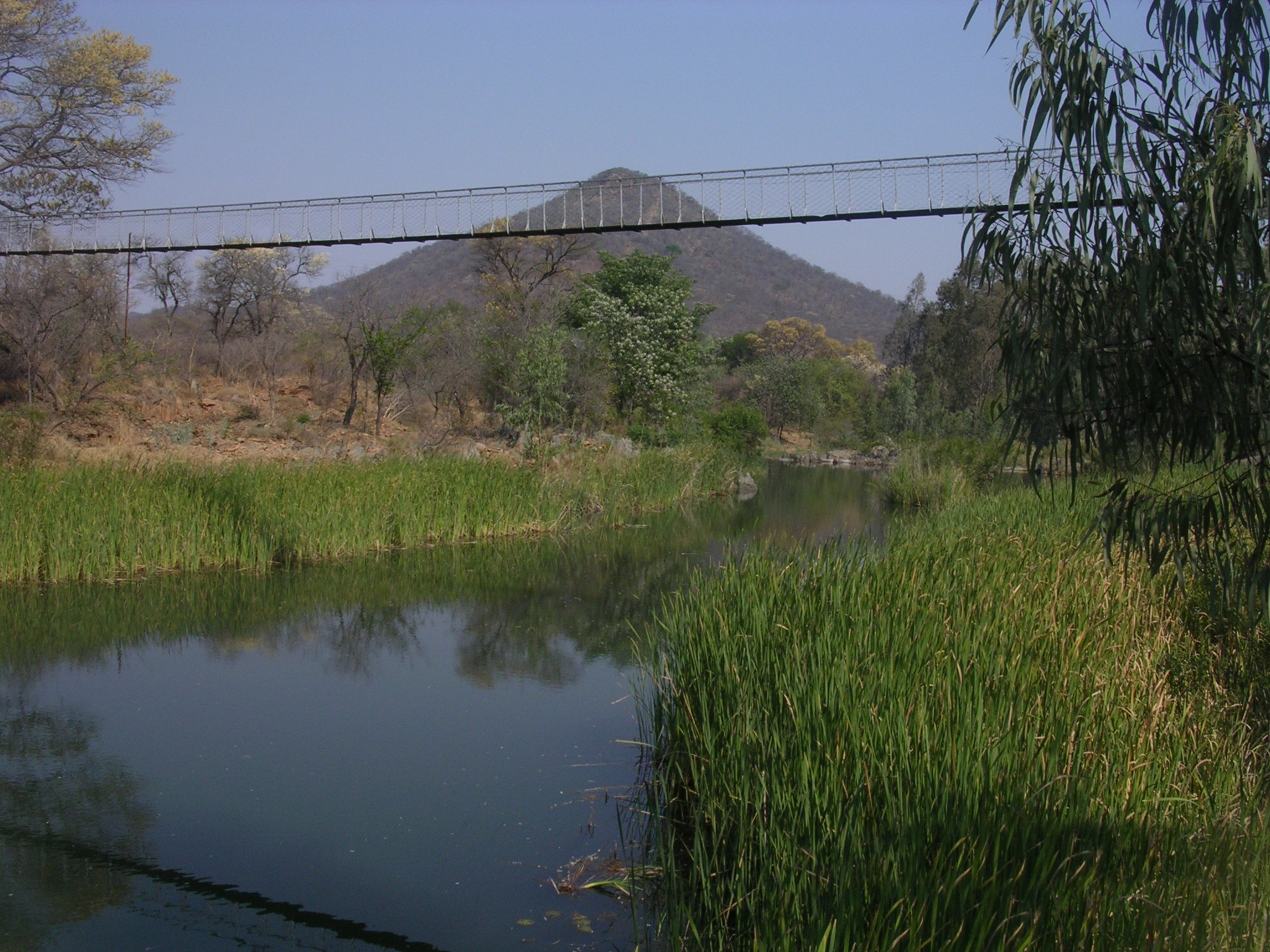
Mtshabezi River in Gwanda

Gwanda is a town in Zimbabwe. It is the capital of the province of Matabeleland South, one of the ten administrative provinces in the country. It is also the district capital of Gwanda District, one of the seven administrative districts in the province.

== Location ==
The town is located 134 kilometres (83 mi), by road, south east of the city of Bulawayo, Zimbabwe's second largest city. This location lies on the Bulawayo–Beitbridge Road and the Beitbridge Bulawayo Railway. The town of Beitbridge, at Zimbabwe's border with the Republic of South Africa, lies 197 kilometres (122 mi), further southeast on Highway A-6. The coordinates of Gwanda, Zimbabwe are: 20°56'20.0"S, 29°01'07.0"E (Latitude:-20.938889; Longitude:29.018611). Gwanda sits at an average elevation of 3,300 feet (1,006 m) above mean sea level. Gwanda is known to have long, hot summers, and short, cool winters. Gwanda is also quite dry as compared to the rest of the country, and is therefore prone to drought.

== Overview ==
Gwanda was founded in 1900 as a settlement of European gold miners and prospectors. Its name derives from that of a nearby hill known as Jahunda. It is located on the Bulawayo-Beitbridge road and the railway that runs south to West Nicholson. The town is the a centre for Matebeleland South’s cattle ranching industry and also trades in agricultural produce. There are gold, asbestos, and chrome mines in the vicinity, and game reserves nearby. Stone Age implements have been found in the Gwalingemba Hills, which are located 32 miles (52 km) south of Gwanda.

Gwanda is administratively run by the Municipality of Gwanda, whose jurisdiction covers 10 wards across the town. Gwanda is the location of the District headquarters of Gwanda District. It is also home to the Matabeleland South provincial offices of various government departments, which are mainly located at the government complex along 3rd Avenue, between Queen Street and Khartoum Street.

The town has a provincial hospital, Gwanda Provincial Hospital, which serves as a referral centre for nearby smaller mission and district hospitals. Services provided include emergency medicine, paediatrics, maternity, eye surgery, minor orthopaedic surgery, general surgery and an expanded immunisation program. The town is the chief centre for south-western Zimbabwe's cattle district and also trades in agricultural produce. There are asbestos, chromium and gold mines around Gwanda.

The main stadium is called Phelandaba Stadium. It was home to the former Zimbabwe Premier Soccer League team, Njube Sundowns. Currently there is Gwanda Pirates FC which is affectionately known as Ezimnyama ngenkani which plays in the ZIFA Central Region Division 1. Financial services are provided by commercial banks, including CBZ Bank Limited, Post Office Savings Bank, AgriBank Zimbabwe and ZB Bank Limited.

== Population ==
According to the 1982 Population Census, the town had a population of 4,874. The town chiefs refused to acknowledge the results of the 1992 census as they felt they had been undercounted. Officially, that disputed figure was 10,565. In 2012, the national population census enumerated the towns population was at 20,226. Most residents of Gwanda are ethnically Ndebele, and isiNdebele and English are the languages most commonly spoken. There are also Shona and Sotho people in Gwanda.

== Notable people ==
The former president of Zambia, Rupiah Banda, was born in this town, in a place called Miko. Professor Thomas Tlou of the University of Botswana, former Botswana Ambassador to the U.N., was born in Gwanda. He was also co-author with Alec Campbell of History of Botswana.
