= Hwange Solar Power Station =

Solar farm in Zimbabwe

- Country: Zimbabwe
- Location: Cross Mabale, Hwange, Hwange District, Matabeleland North Province
- Coordinates: 18.567325°S 27.031536°E
- Status: Operational
- Owner: SolGas Energy
- Operator: SolGas Energy

Solar farm
- Type: Flat-panel PV
- Site area: 100 hectares (250 acres)

Power generation
- Nameplate capacity: 50 MW (67,000 hp)

The Hwange Solar Power Station, also Cross Mabale Solar Power Station, is a 15 MW (20,000 hp) solar power plant in Zimbabwe. The power station was initially commercially commissioned as a 5 MW power station in 2021. It is owned and was developed by SolGas Energy, a Zimbabwean independent power producer. The off-taker is Zimbabwe Electricity Transmission and Distribution Company (ZETDC), which integrates the energy into the national grid. A 25-year power purchase agreement governs the sale and purchase of electricity between SolGas Energy and ZETDC.

== Location ==
The power station is located in the community of Cross Mabale, in the city of Hwange, in Hwange District, in Matabeleland North Province, in western Zimbabwe. Hwange is located about 463 kilometres (288 mi) northwest of Bulawayo, Zimbabwe's second-largest city. This is approximately 103 kilometres (64 mi) southeast of Victoria Falls, Zimbabwe, at the international border with Zambia.

== Overview ==
The power station is designed to have capacity of 50 megawatts, developed in several phases. The first phase was of 5 megawatts. As of July 2022, the power station was entering constriction of the second phase of 10 megawatts to bring new total capacity to 15 MW. Subsequent phases are expected to expand the power station to the designed capacity.

== Construction ==
The first phase of this project, with capacity of 5 MW, cost US$7.5 million. The contractors were Soventix SA, Excess Africa and Proconics, all South African companies. As part of this development, SolGas constructed a new 33kV transmission line, measuring approximately 28 kilometres (17 mi) from Cross Mabale to the ZETDC substation at Dete to evacuate the power to the grid.

== Financing ==
The development project has received funding support from several partners. These have included Old Mutual, ANF Capital, Ainos Ngadya, Mushoriwa-Pasi Corporate Attorneys and Stanbic Bank. Old Mutual Investments Group also acquired 49 percent shareholding in SolGas Energy in 2017.

== See also ==
- List of power stations in Zimbabwe
