= Harava Solar Power Station =

Solar farm in Zimbabwe

- Country: Zimbabwe
- Location: Bwoni, Seke Rural, Seke District
- Coordinates: 18°07′01″S 31°15′22″E
- Status: Under construction
- Construction began: 2019
- Commission date: 2022 (expected)
- Construction cost: US$25 million
- Owner: Harava Solar Limited

Solar farm
- Type: Flat-panel PV

Power generation
- Units operational: 66000
- Nameplate capacity: 20 megawatts (27,000 hp)

The Harava Solar Power Station is a 20 megawatts (27,000 hp) solar power plant under construction in Zimbabwe. The project is owned and under development by Harava Solar Limited and entity owned by the Seke Community, in partnership with the government of Zimbabwe. The energy generated here will be purchased by Zimbabwe Electricity Supply Authority (ZESA), under a 25-year power purchase agreement (PPA).

== Location ==
The power station sits on 28 hectares (69 acres), near the community of Bwoni, in Seke Rural Constituency, in Seke District, Mashonaland East Province, approximately 47 kilometres (29 mi), by road, southeast of Zimbabwe's capital city, Harare. This solar farm lies approximately 11 kilometres (7 mi) southeast of the diesel-fired Dema Thermal Power Station.

== Overview ==
The power station has a capacity of 20 megawatts, to be sold directly to ZESA for integration into the national electricity grid. The electricity is evacuated via a new 10 kilometres (6 mi), 132kV high voltage transmission line that transmits the power to the new 330kV substation at Dema Power Station, where it enters the national grid.

== Developers ==
The power station was developed by a special purpose vehicle company, Harava Solar Limited, specifically set up to develop, build and operate this solar power station. Harava Solar is a joint venture between the Seke Community and the Zimbabwean Ministry of Energy and Power Development.

== Construction timeline, costs and funding ==
The cost of construction was budgeted at US$25 million, fully funded by the Zimbabwean government. The power station was expected to begin commercial operations in November 2021.

== Controversy ==
In the second half of 2019, Soventix SA of Germany, the engineering, procurement and construction (EPC) contractor, stopped paying eXess Africa of South Africa, a sub-contactor on the project. When negotiations failed the matter was taken to court, with eXess Africa demanding over US$1 million in unpaid claims for installed capacity of 6MW and a substation. Harava Solar is counterclaiming material (steel pipes) removed from the site by the subcontractor's officials, when payment was not forthcoming. Work on the power station stalled in 2021.

== See also ==
- List of power stations in Zimbabwe
- Kwekwe Solar Power Station
