= Victoria Falls Solar Power Station =

Solar farm in Zimbabwe

- Country: Zimbabwe
- Location: Victoria Falls, Hwange District, Matabeleland North Province
- Coordinates: 17°55′39″S 25°50′54″E
- Status: Under construction
- Commission date: April 2022 (Expected)
- Owner: Kibo Energy
- Operator: Kibo Energy

Solar farm
- Type: Flat-panel PV

Power generation
- Nameplate capacity: 100 MW (130,000 hp)

The Victoria Falls Solar Power Station is a 100 megawatts solar power plant under construction in Zimbabwe. The project is under development by Kibo Energy, an independent power producer (IPP), based in Dublin, Ireland. The project was originally owned by Broomfield International, another IPP, who began its development. In March 2022, Kibo Energy acquired the assets and liabilities of Victoria Falls Solar Power Station, for consideration of £10 million (US$13 million). The power station is being developed in phases of 25 MW each. The first 5 megawatts of the first phase is expected online in April 2022. A ten-year power purchase agreement has been signed between the owner/developer and the off-taker, Zimbabwe Electricity Supply Authority (ZESA).

== Location ==
The power station is located in the city of Victoria Falls, in Hwange District in Matabeleland North Province. This location is adjacent to the Victoria Water Falls, approximately 709 kilometres (441 mi) west of Harare, the capital and largest city in of Zimbabwe.

== Overview ==
Broomfield International was awarded the concession to build this 100 megawatt solar firm. They obtained all the licenses and authorizations, including a PPA with ZESA. In March 2022, with 5 megawatts installed, Broomfield sold their interests in this power station to Kibo Energy, based in Ireland or a consideration of £10 million (US$13 million) .

The power station will be built in four phases, with capacity of 25 MW, each. The first 5 megawatts of the first phase are expected to come online in April 2022, with the remaining 20 megawatts expected in December 2022. The next phases are expected to be built in subsequent years.

The power station's output is expected to be sold directly to the Zimbabwe Electricity Transmission and Distribution Company (ZETDC) for integration into the national grid, under a long-term PPA.

== Other considerations ==
Victoria Falls Solar Power Station is located within 1 kilometre (1 mi) of the Hwange–Victoria Falls High Voltage Power Line. The energy from this solar farm will be directed to that power line, where it will enter the Zimbabwean national electricity grid.

== See also ==
- List of power stations in Zimbabwe
