= Bulawayo Solid Waste Energy Plant =

Zimbabwean waste-to-energy power station

- Country: Zimbabwe
- Location: Bulawayo
- Coordinates: 20°10′05″S 28°26′31″E
- Status: Proposed
- Construction began: 2022 Expected
- Commission date: 2026 Expected
- Construction cost: US$150 million
- Owner: Pragma Leaf Consulting Zimbabwe (Private) Limited
- Operator: Diverseflex Resources (Private) Limited

Thermal power station
- Primary fuel: Solid waste

Power generation
- Nameplate capacity: 11.5 MW (15,400 hp)

Bulawayo Solid Waste Energy Plant, also Bulawayo Waste–To–Energy Plant, is a planned solid waste-fired thermal power plant in Bulawayo, the second-largest city in Zimbabwe. The waste-to-energy power station is expected to convert 325 tonnes of solid waste into 78,000–110,000 liters (17,158–24,197 imp gal; 20,605–29,059 U.S. gal) of biodiesel and 60 cubic metres (2,119 cu ft) of biogas on a daily basis. In the process, the plant will generate 11.35 MW of electricity".

== Location ==
The power station would be located in Bulawayo, the second-largest city in the country.

== Overview ==
The waste-to-energy project is under development, primarily to address the situation of excess sold waste in the city of Bulawayo. If and when completed, it will be one of a few waste-to-energy installations in sub-Saharan Africa. As of January 2022, one functional unit exists in Ethiopia, and another, Kinshasa Thermal Power Station, is in the development phase, in the Democratic Republic of the Congo.

When fully constituted, the plant which will be developed in phases, is expected to process 352 tonnes of solid waste every day and convert it into electricity, diesel fuel, and biogas. The project also has the capability of producing manure from the organic component of the solid waste.

== Developers ==
The development of the waste-to-energy installation is led by Pragma Leaf Consulting, an outfit based in the United Kingdom. Other joint venture partners include Geo Power, out of the Netherlands. The owner/developers have established an ad-hoc special vehicle company, Diverseflex Resources (Private) Limited which will own, design, fund, build and operate the energy complex.

== Cost, funding and timetable ==
The development budget is reported as US$150 million. The consortium that owns the plant will operate it for 25 years after commissioning. The electricity generated by he plant will be sold to Zimbabwe Electricity Supply Authority (ZESA), for integration into the national grid.

== See also ==
- List of power stations in Zimbabwe
- Ayebo Biomass Power Station
