= Mbeubeuss Landfill =

Landfill in Senegal

- Décharge de Mbeubeuss
- Location within Senegal
- Alternative names: Mbeubeuss Rubbish Dump

General information
- Location: Mbeubeuss, Malika District, Pikine Department, Dakar, Senegal
- Coordinates: 14°48′09″N 17°18′48″W
- Owner: City of Dakar

The Mbeubeuss Landfill (French: Décharge de Mbeubeuss), also Mbeubeuss Rubbish Dump is a solid waste disposal site in Senegal. It is the main solid waste disposal site for the capital city of Dakar, with a projected population of approximately 4 million people, as of 2022, serving the homes, businesses and industries of that metropolis. The landfill hosts an estimated 4,000 scavengers looking for anything recyclable, primarily plastic. The landfill has been in existence since 1968, however the Senegalese authorities propose to shut it down and set up smaller recycling centers instead.

== Location ==
The landfill is located in the neighborhood called Mbeubeuss, in Malika District, in the Pikine Department of the city of Dakar, the national capital and largest city in that country. This is approximately 25 kilometres (16 mi) northeast of Dakar's central business district. The geographical coordinates of Mbeubeuss Landfill are 14°48'09.0"N, 17°18'48.0"W (Latitude:14.802500; Longitude:-17.313333).

== Overview ==
Mbeubeuss Landfill was established in 1968, as a replacement for the Hann Landfill which closed in 1971. As of 2011 the site received an estimated 1,000 to 2,000 tonnes of solid waste from the city of Dakar on a daily basis.

As of January 2022, an estimated 4,000 people lived and worked in the landfill, scavenging for recyclables including metal, cardboard, electronics, plastic and such. Some sell food and drink to those in the landfill, regardless of the stench.

In 1990, three of the long-time dwellers/workers in the landfill formed and association,"Association Bokk Diom des Récupérateurs et Recycleurs de Mbeubeuss" (Bokk Diom), to advocate for their rights and improve the public perception of their "trade".

== Future plans ==
In 2020, the government of Senegal indicated that it planned to set aside €259 million to rehabilitate the landfill that occupies 114 hectares (280 acres). Bokk Diom, the local association of trash pickers and recyclers are opposed to closing the landfill or relocation of the dumpsite. Discussions about rehabilitating the landfill and improving the lives of the people who live and work there have gone on for several decades.

== See also ==
- Kiteezi Landfill
- Kakamega Waste To Energy Plant
- Pomona Waste To Energy Power Station
