= Seke =

Seke may refer to:

- Seke language (Nepal), a Sino-Tibetan language related to Thakali
- Seke language (Vanuatu) or Ske, an Oceanic language of Pentecost Island
- Seke District, a district in Mashonaland East, Zimbabwe
- Seke Rural, a parliamentary constituency in Zimbabwe
- SEKE, a former name of the Communist Party of Greece

== See also ==
- Seki language or Sheke, a Bantu language of Equatorial Guinea and Gabon
- Seke-Banza, a community in the Democratic Republic of the Congo
