= Bulawayo Thermal Power Station =

Zimbabwean power station

- Country: Zimbabwe
- Location: Bulawayo
- Coordinates: 20°09′33″S 28°34′33″E
- Status: Operational
- Commission date: 1957
- Decommission date: 2023
- Owner: Zimbabwe Power Company

Thermal power station
- Primary fuel: Coal

Power generation
- Nameplate capacity: 90 MW (120,000 hp)

Bulawayo Thermal Power Station is a 90 MW (120,000 hp) coal-fired thermal power plant located in the city of Bulawayo in Bulawayo Metropolitan Province of Zimbabwe.

== Location ==
The power station is located in the central business district of Bulawayo, approximately 442 kilometres (275 mi), by road, southwest of Harare the capital and largest city of Zimbabwe. The coordinates of the power station are:20°09'33.0"S, 28°34'33.0"E (Latitude:-20.159167; Longitude:28.575833).

== Overview ==
The power station is owned and operated by Zimbabwe Power Company, (ZPC), a parastatal of the Government of Zimbabwe. ZPC is a 100 percent subsidiary of Zimbabwe Electricity Supply Authority. The station was constructed between 1947 and 1957 by Bulawayo Municipal Council. At that time, generation capacity was 120 megawatts.

The plant uses coal, primarily from Hwange Colliery, which is brought in by rail and road. In 1999, the power station underwent a major overhaul and modernization repairs, which reduced generation capacity to 90 megawatts. As of 2019, the generation capacity had deteriorated to about 30 megawatts, due to antiquated equipment and lack of maintenance for many years.

== Upgrade ==
In 2019, the Zimbabwean government publicly announced its intentions to overhaul, refurbish and modernize the power station, so that it would generate 90 megawatts again. Two of the six cooling towers will be demolished in the process. The remaining four cooling towers will be refurbished to prolong their life span by another 15 to 20 years.

In November 2018, the Government of India extended a line of credit worth US$333 million to the government of Zimbabwe, of which US$23 million was to fund the upgrade to Bulawayo Thermal Power Station.

== See also ==
- List of power stations in Zimbabwe
