= Energy in Zimbabwe =

Energy in Zimbabwe is a serious problem for the country. Extensive use of firewood leads to deforestation and the electricity production capacity is too low for the current level of consumption.

Zimbabwe has one hydropower plant and four coal-fired generators that produce a total combined capacity of 2,240 megawatts (MW). Only 79.9% of the population have access to electricity.

Greenhouse gas emissions from Zimbabwe’s energy sector come from combustion of carbon-based fuels as well as fugitive emissions during coal mining processes. As part of Zimbabwe’s national climate change response policy, the country vowed to promote energy efficiency, reduce carbon emissions, and develop low-carbon energy infrastructure. Although a tax the Zimbabwean government calls carbon tax exists, it only taxes certain imported fuels and more closely resembles a tariff or fuel tax.

== Animal power ==
Animal power is a very useful source of energy in Zimbabwe. It is estimated that animals contribute with the equivalent of 6.8 million liters of diesel in the agricultural sector.

== Fuelwood ==
Fuelwood is the most important domestic fuel in Zimbabwe. It was estimated to stand for about 50% of the total consumption in 2001. This has led to deforestation in parts of the country with accompanying environmental problems such as erosion and diminishing wildlife.

== Biogas ==
There is potential for biogas capture and distribution to reduce fuelwood consumption for cooking.

== Coal ==
Zimbabwe has 30 billion tons of coal in 21 known deposits. This could last for over 100 years at the 2001 rate of production.

In September 2013, the Chinese-backed company China Africa Sunlight Energy said it would begin work in early 2014 on a 600 MW coal-fired electricity plant in western Zimbabwe, part of $2 billion of energy projects in the country.

== Liquid fuels ==
Zimbabwe owns a pipeline from the Mozambique port of Beira to Mutare provides the majority of Zimbabwe's refined petroleum and diesel oil; the rest comes from South Africa. An ambitious project to produce 20% of the country's liquid fuel as ethanol from cane has been started in Chipinge, Manicaland.

== Electricity ==
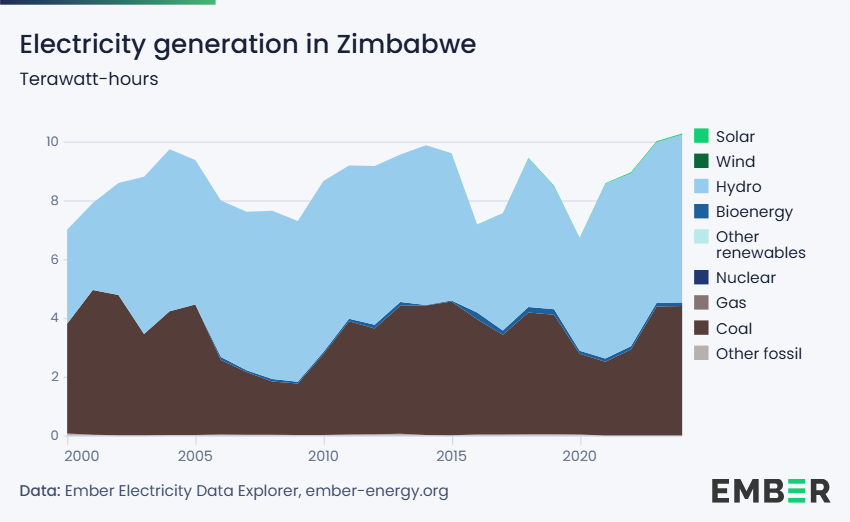
Electricity generation in Zimbabwe in terawatt-hours

=== Electricity generation ===
Electricity is generated at the Kariba Dam (ca. 750 MW), the Hwange Thermal Power Station (installed capacity 920 MW) and three minor coal-fired stations. All coal-fired stations are in need of major upgrades due to neglect of maintenance and they have frequent production stops or are not producing at all. This leads to frequent and long lasting blackouts.

=== Electricity transmission and distribution ===
The government-owned Zimbabwe Electricity Supply Authority (ZESA) is the country's power generating and distributing company.

=== Electricity interconnectors ===
Zimbabwe is a member of the Southern African Power Pool. Imports of energy from neighbouring countries are not enough to solve the undercapacity problem and lack of electricity hampers economic growth.

A second interconnector with South Africa is in advanced planning stages, according to PIDA, the Programme for Infrastructure Development in Africa. Construction of the Zimbabwe section of the 320 km/ 400 kV South Africa to Zimbabwe transmission interconnector will form part of the total 935 km project across Mozambique, Zimbabwe and South Africa.

=== Distributed energy ===
Small scale power generators are used all over the country to ease the situation.

=== Renewable electricity ===
==== Hydro and Micro-hydro ====
Apart from the Kariba Dam power station, hydropower in Zimbabwe has still a lot of potential, especially along the Zambezi river.

==== Solar electricity ====
Solar power has enormous potential both in small scale, such as water heating or in larger scale such as in solar power plants. However, the nation's current economic condition makes adequately rapid solar power buildups seem unrealistic, short of capital infusions and technology transfers from developed world economies. However, the nation has a solar power industry with over a dozen companies providing solar power systems for residences and commercial enterprises with the largest PV power system of about 600 kWp for the Kefalos cheese factory. A project in partnership with the United Arab Emirates will result in the construction of a 2,000 MW solar power plant, built in two phases. If completed it would be the largest solar power plant in the world.

==== Wind power ====
Wind turbine farms could be other possibility for developing a renewable energy infrastructure for Zimbabwe which could comply with the post-2015 sustainable development goals.

== See also ==
- Energy in Africa
- List of power stations in Zimbabwe
- Ministry of Energy and Power Development
- Southern African Power Pool
- Zimbabwe Electricity Supply Authority
- Zimbabwe Energy Regulatory Authority
- Zimbabwe Power Company
