= Norton Solar Power Station =

Solar farm in Zimbabwe

- Country: Zimbabwe
- Location: Norton, Mashonaland West Province
- Coordinates: 17°59′59″S 30°36′56″E
- Status: Proposed
- Construction cost: US$125.5 million
- Owner: Norton Solar Company

Solar farm
- Type: Flat-panel PV

Power generation
- Nameplate capacity: 100 MW (130,000 hp)

Norton Solar Power Station, is a planned solar power plant in Zimbabwe. The 100 megawatt installation is under development by the government of Zimbabwe and independent investors from the country of Belarus. However, the project is expected to be developed under the independent power producer model, with a 25-year power purchase guarantee by the Zimbabwe Electricity Distribution Company (ZETDC), as part of the arrangements.

== Location ==
The power station would be located in the city of Norton, in Mashonaland West Province. The government of Zimbabwe has identified pieces of real estate near Norton which will host the solar farm. Norton is located approximately 50 kilometres (31 mi) by road, southwest of Harare, the capital and largest city in Zimbabwe.

== Overview ==
The solar farm would have generation capacity of 100 megawatts. The energy produced would be sold to ZETDC, under a 25-year power purchase plan. The energy would then be integrated into the Zimbabwean national grid. The Belarus-based investors plan to establish a special purpose company that will be involved in renewable energy generation and possibly other investments. For descriptive purposes we will call the special renewable energy investment company: Norton Solar Company (NSC).

== Cost, funding and timetable ==
The construction budget is quoted as US$125.5 million.

== See also ==
- List of power stations in Zimbabwe
- Umguza Solar Power Station
