= Umguza Solar Power Station =

Solar farm in Zimbabwe

- Country: Zimbabwe
- Location: Umguza District, Matabeleland North
- Coordinates: 20°00′24″S 28°11′38″E
- Status: Proposed
- Construction began: 2021 (Expected)
- Commission date: 2022 (Expected)
- Owner: AF Power Private Limited

Solar farm
- Type: Flat-panel PV

Power generation
- Nameplate capacity: 200 MW

The Umguza Solar Power Station is a proposed 200 MW solar power plant in Zimbabwe. The project which will be developed in phases, will see 50 megawatts developed in the first phase. The rest of the project is expected to follow after about three years. The power station is under development by AF Power Private Limited, an independent power producer (IPP), based in Singapore.

== Location ==
The power station would be located in Umguza District, in Matabeleland North Province, outside the city of Bulawayo, the second largest city in Zimbabwe.

== Overview ==
Umguza Solar Power Station is designed to have capacity of 200 megawatts. Its output is expected to be sold directly to the Zimbabwe Electricity Supply Authority (ZESA). The long-term power purchase agreement (PPA) governing that transaction had not been signed yet, but was anticipated, as of August 2021.

== Developers ==
The power station is being developed by a Singapore-based group AF Power Private Limited, that is active in Africa, Asia and South America, in the areas of renewable energy, oil and gas, agriculture, and mining. The IPP is collaborating with the Zimbabwe Investment & Development Agency (ZIDA), and the Singapore Cooperation Enterprise (SCE).

== Timeline ==
According to public statements by the IPP and the government of Zimbabwe, construction for the first phase of 50 megawatts is expected to start in the second half of 2021 and conclude in less than 12 months. Other phases are expected to follow the first phase.

== See also ==
- List of power stations in Zimbabwe
- Norton Solar Power Station
