= Amanda Zuva Habane =

- Born: Amanda Zuva; 21 September 1986 (age 39); Seke District, Zimbabwe
- Spouse: Prince Habane

Amanda Zuva Habane is a Zimbabwean socialite and businesswoman who was nominated as the Business woman of the year for the African Women of Essence Awards 2019.

== Background ==
Born on 21 September 1986 in Seke, Zuva grew up in Gweru where in 2003 she was crowned Miss Gweru. In 2019 she revealed her abusive past, which she indicated as her inspiration to help other women who might be facing similar situations.

She is married to Prince Habane and they have two children.
