= Zambezi National Park =

National park in Zimbabwe

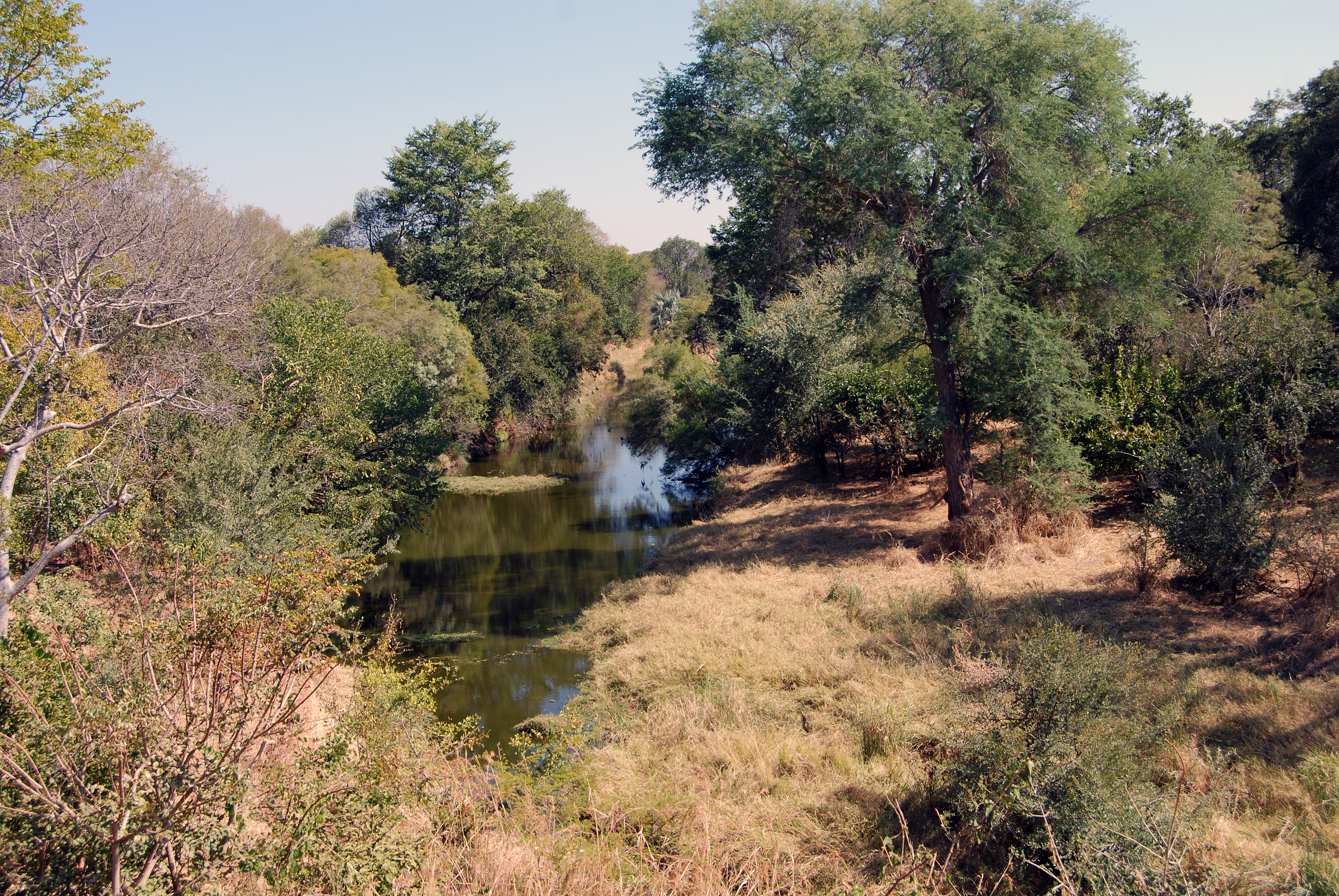
- Zambezi National Park near Victoria Falls

- Location within Zimbabwe
- Location: Hwange District, Zimbabwe
- Coordinates: 17.926476°S 25.634422°E
- Area: 560 km^{2} (220 sq mi)
- Established: 1979

Zambezi National Park is a national park in Zimbabwe located upstream from Victoria Falls on the Zambezi River. It was split off from Victoria Falls National Park in 1979 and is 56,000 hectares (140,000 acres) in size. The park is bisected by a road to Kazungula, dividing it into a riverine side and a Chamabonda Vlei side. Most of the park is within the ecoregion of Zambezian and Mopane woodlands, while a small portion in the south is within the Zambezian Baikiaea woodlands.

== Fauna ==
The Zambezi National Park plays host to a wide variety of larger mammals including African elephant, lion, Cape buffalo and leopard. There also exists herds of sable antelope, common eland, common zebra, Southern giraffe, greater kudu, waterbuck and impala. In addition, many species of smaller wildlife can be seen here.

Over 400 species of birds have been recorded within the Zambezi National Park. Pel's fishing owl, African skimmer, collared palm thrush, lanner falcon, goliath heron, African finfoot, rock pratincole and long-toed lapwing are considered to be among the speciality birds of the park. Aside from birds and land animals, there are 75 species of fish located in the park, including the famous tiger fish. The small (but very scenic) Zambezi National Park is a great destination for a day trip from Victoria Falls since it is located next to it. There are also several lodges overlooking the Zambezi River inside the park offering a real bush experience. Elephant and buffalo are regularly seen, as well as giraffe and zebra. There is a good variety of antelope including water buck, impala and sable.

== Access ==
The easiest way to access the Zambezi National Park is via the Zambezi River Game Drive, which is extensive network of roads along the banks of the Zambezi and is accessed through the main gate. There is a 25 kilometre Chamabondo Game Drive that can take the visitor into the wilder southern part of the Park, and which starts 5 kilometres south of Victoria Falls town; just off the A8 road.
