= Kwekwe Solar Power Station =

Solar farm in Zimbabwe

- Country: Zimbabwe
- Location: Kwekwe, Midlands Province
- Coordinates: 18°47′27″S 29°48′10″E
- Status: Proposed
- Owner: Kwekwe Energy Company

Solar farm
- Type: Flat-panel PV

Power generation
- Nameplate capacity: 50 MW (67,000 hp)

The Kwekwe Solar Power Station is a proposed 50 MW (67,000 hp) solar power plant in Zimbabwe. The power station is under development by a consortium comprising Tatanga Energy, an independent power producer (IPP) and Sable Chemical Industries, a fertilizer-manufacturing company. The energy generated by this station is intended for use, primarily in the fertilizer factory, with the excess sold to Zimbabwe Electricity Supply Authority (ZESA), for integration into the national electricity grid.

== Location ==
The power station would be located near the town of Kwekwe, near the factories of Sable Chemical Industries Limited, approximately 66 kilometres (41 mi), north of the city of Gweru, the provincial capital. Kwekwe is located about 215.5 kilometres (133.9 mi), by road, south-west of Harare, the capital and largest city of Zimbabwe.

== Overview ==
The power station, which will be developed in phases, has a maximum generation capacity of the first phase of 50 megawatts. The solar farm's output will be used, primarily, in the ammonium nitrate manufacturing factory. Any excess energy will be sold to ZESA, for integration into the Zimbabwean national electricity grid.

As part of the first phase of this project, an 88kV high voltage transmission power line will be constructed to link with "the adjacent 88kV power line connecting Sable Chemicals substation to Sherwood substation".

The owner/developers of the power station have plans to expand its capacity in the future, from 50 megawatts to 150 megawatts.

== Developers ==
The power station is under development as a joint venture between Tatanga Energy, a Zimbabwean IPP and Sable Chemical Industries Limited, a Zimbabwean fertilizer manufacturer.

== See also ==
- List of power stations in Zimbabwe
- Harava Solar Power Station
