= Bio2Watt Malmesbury Thermal Power Station =

South African waste to energy plant

- Bio2Watt Malmesbury Thermal Power Station
- Country: South Africa
- Location: Malmesbury, Swartland, West Coast District, Western Cape
- Coordinates: 33°45′03″S 18°36′15″E
- Status: Under construction
- Commission date: 2023 Expected
- Owner: Bio2Watt
- Operator: Cape Dairy Project Private Limited

Thermal power station
- Primary fuel: Biogas

Power generation
- Nameplate capacity: 4.8 MW (6,400 hp)

Bio2Watt Malmesbury Thermal Power Station is a 4.8 MW (6,400 hp) biogas-fired thermal power plant under development in South Africa. Bio2Watt, a South African company, entirely owned by Black women, has signed a power purchase agreement (PPA) to supply 4.8 megawatts of electricity to South African Breweries (SAB) for use in their brewery near Cape Town. As raw material, the power station is designed to start with animal manure and urine, produced by 7,000 head of cattle at Morester's Vyvlei Dairy Farm. These will be supplemented by other organic waste, collected from farms and businesses in the nearby town of Malmesbury. The raw material will be digested anaerobically to produce industrial-grade biogas. The biogas will then be ignited to produce heat. That heat will be used to turn electric generators and produce electricity.

== Location ==
The power plant is under construction at Morester's Vyvlei Dairy Farm, near the town of Malmesbury, in Swartland Municipality, West Coast District, in South Africa's Western Cape Province. Malmesbury is approximately 66 kilometres (41 mi), northeast of Cape Town, the nearest large city.

== Overview ==
There are 70,000 dairy cows at Morester's Vyvlei Dairy Farm. The milk that they produce is supplied directly to the South African food and beverages company, Clover Industries Limited. Bio2Watt, plans to collect the manure and urine produced by those 70,000 cows and supplement it with organic waste collected from the town of Malmesbury. All this waste will then be anaerobically digested in new bio-digesters installed at the dairy farm.

The biogas will then be ignited to produce heat. The heat will be used to turn gas generators and produce electricity. In March 2022 Bio2Watt signed a long-term power purchase agreement (PPA), to supply 4.8 megawatts of electricity to the SAB brewery near Cape Town.

== Ownership ==
The power station is owned and under development by Bio2Watt, a South African business entirely owned by Black women. Bio2Watt has established an ad hoc company Cape Dairy Project (Pty) Limited (CDP), to develop, own, fund operate and maintain this renewable power project. CDP selected Anaergia, a Canadian company as the engineering, procurement and construction (EPC) contractor.

== Funding ==
Funding sources for this waste-to-energy project include the entities listed in the table below:

Sources of Funding For Bio2Watt Malmesbury Thermal Power Station
Rank	Funding Partner	Domicile	Notes
1	Norfund	Norway	
2	Public Investment Corporation	South Africa	
3	Bio2Watt	South Africa	

== Other considerations ==
This plant is the second waste-to-energy plant that is operated by Bio2Watt in South Africa. In October 2015, Bio2Watt began supplying 4.6 megawatts of electricity to the BMW automotive plant in Rosslyn, Gauteng, approximately 30 kilometres (19 mi) northwest of Pretoria, under a 10-year PPA.

== See also ==
- List of power stations in South Africa
- Divo Biomass Power Station
- Sfax Waste To Methane Gas Project
