= Kiteezi Landfill =

Dumpsite in Uganda

- Kiteezi Kasasiro
- Location within Uganda
- Alternative names: Kiteezi Rubbish Dump

General information
- Location: Kiteezi, Kawempe Division, Kampala, Uganda
- Coordinates: 0°24′39″N 32°34′33″E
- Construction started: 1996; 30 years ago
- Owner: Kampala Capital City Authority

The Kiteezi Landfill (Luganda: Kiteezi Kasasiro), also known as the Kiteezi Rubbish Dump, is a solid waste disposal site in Uganda. It is the main solid waste disposal site for the capital city of Kampala, with a projected metropolitan population of approximately 4 million people, as of 2024, serving the homes, businesses and industries of that metropolis.

The landfill hosts an estimated 800 to 1,000 scavengers looking for recyclable items. The landfill receives anywhere between 1,500 and 2,000 tonnes of solid waste every 24 hours from all five divisions of Kampala and neighboring parts of Wakiso District. The "communities around the landfill live with contaminated air, scattered waste and leachate. Water resources for drinking and domestic purposes have become polluted".

== Location ==
The landfill is located in the neighborhood called Kiteezi, in Kawempe Division in extreme northern Kampala, at the border with Wakiso District. The Landfill is within the city, but the village of Kiteezi extends into Wakiso District, as shown on this map. This is approximately 14 kilometres (9 mi) north of Kampala's central business district. The landfill sits on approximately 35–36 acres (14–15 ha) of land owned by Kampala Capital City Authority. The geographical coordinates of Kiteezi Landfill are 0°24'39.0"N, 32°34'33.0"E (Latitude:0.410833; Longitude:32.575833).

== Overview ==
Kiteezi Landfill was established in 1996, with financing from the World Bank, to provide a single major depository of the solid waste generated by the city of Kampala. As of 2024 the site receives an estimated 1,500 to 2,000 tonnes of solid waste from the city on a daily basis. As of December 2021, an estimated 800 people lived and worked in the landfill, scavenging for recyclables including metal, cardboard, electronics, plastic and such. By August 2024, that number had increased to an estimated 1,000 people. Ugandan media indicated that in 2012, the landfill reached maximum capacity, however it continued to receive trash until August 2024.

== 2024 landfill avalanche ==
2024 Kiteezi Landfill landslide
- Date: August 9, 2024
- Location: Kiteezi Landfill, Kawempe Division, Kampala, Uganda
- Also known as: Kiteezi garbage landslide, Uganda landfill landslide, Kiteezi landfill collapse, Uganda rubbish dump
- Cause: Heavy rainfall
- Deaths: 35+
- Missing: 28

The 2024 Kiteezi landfill avalanche was also reported under various titles, including; Kiteezi garbage landslide, Uganda landfill landslide, Kiteezi landfill collapse, Uganda rubbish dump.

On the morning of Friday, 9 August 2024, during a heavy rainstorm, the unstable mountain of garbage at Kiteezi Landfill began to cascade downhill, covering buildings, gardens, livestock and human beings. In the immediate aftermath, 12 human bodies were uncovered and at least one dozen survivors were evacuated to area hospitals. More dead bodies were later discovered in the debris. As of 16 August 2024, a total of 35 dead had been confirmed, with the death toll expected to climb. The debacle contributed to the firing of Dorothy Kisaka, the then Executive Director, and Engineer David Luyimbazi, the Deputy Executive Director of KCCA

== Future plans ==
With Kiteezi Landfill filled to over-capacity, KCCA purchased 136 acres (55 ha) of land in Dundu (Gayaza Dundu), Mukono District in 2021, with a view to build a new landfill and garbage processing center there. This new site is located approximately 33 kilometres (21 mi) northeast of Kampala City center. There was initial community resistance to the new proposed landfill in Dundu.

== Developments ==
In October 2024, Kampala Capital City Authority (KCCA) contracted Jospong Group of Ghana to start a recycling and fertilizer plant at the site. Physical work is expected to begin in March 2025, however survey and mapping work began in October 2024.

== See also ==
- Dandora Dumpsite
- Mbeubeuss Landfill
- Pomona Waste To Energy Power Station
