= Victoria Falls National Park =

National park in Zimbabwe

- IUCN category II (national park)
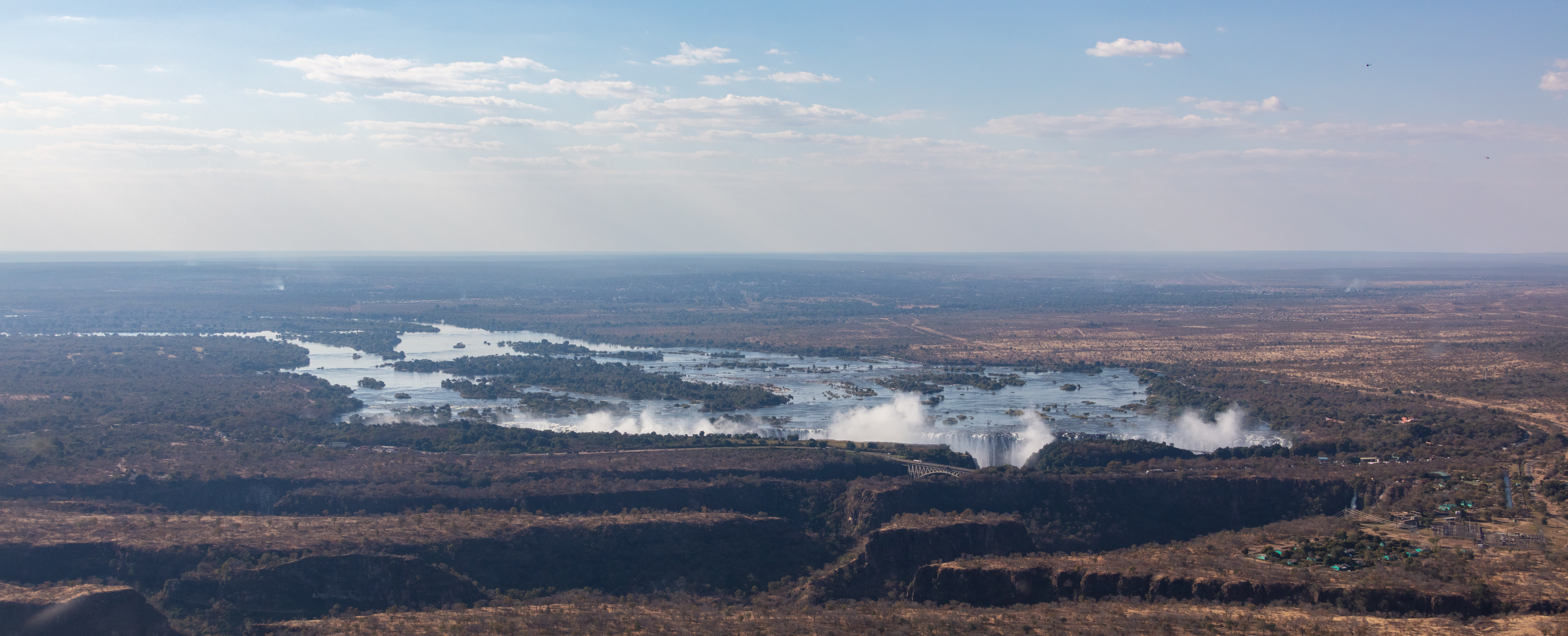
- Interactive map of Victoria Falls National Park
- Location: Hwange District, Zimbabwe
- Nearest city: Victoria Falls
- Coordinates: 17°55′S 25°40′E
- Area: 23.4 km^{2} (9.0 sq mi)
- Governing body: Zimbabwe Parks and Wildlife Management Authority

Ramsar Wetland
- Designated: 3 May 2013
- Reference no.: 2108

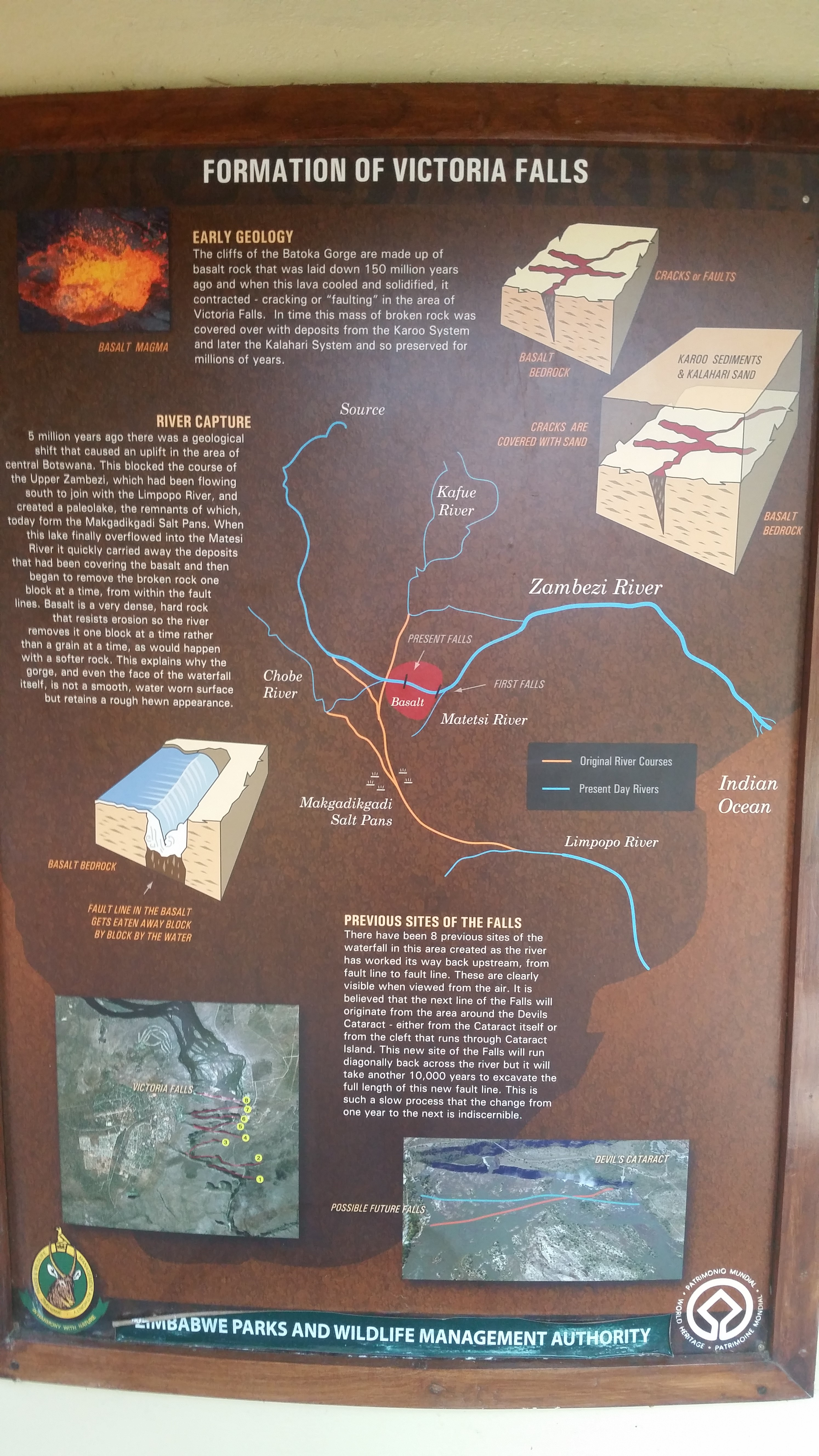
Victoria Falls National Park marker

Victoria Falls National Park in north-western Zimbabwe protects the south and east bank of the Zambezi River in the area of the world-famous Victoria Falls. It extends along the Zambezi river from the larger Zambezi National Park about 6 km above the falls to about 12 km below the falls.

== Nature ==
A notable feature of the park is the rainforest which grows in the spray of the falls, including ferns, palms, liana vines, and a number of trees such as mahogany not seen elsewhere in the region. The damp and shaded environment also supports a rich diversity of fungi, which play a crucial role in the ecosystem by decomposing organic matter and supporting plant health. The park is located within the Zambezian and mopane woodlands ecoregion.

Visitors have the chance to view the elephant, Cape buffalo, southern white rhinoceros, hippopotamus, giraffes, eland and a variety of other antelope herds during drives and walking safaris. A bask of crocodiles may be seen in the river, and a nearby Crocodile Ranch offers a safer view of these dangerous animals.

== Tourism ==
Accommodations for tourists are provided in campsites in the Zambezi National Park and in the numerous resorts and hotels in and around the town of Victoria Falls which forms part of the western boundary of the park. Visitors are required to take precautions against malaria.

== Notes ==
This park is considered for inclusion in the 5 Nation Kavango - Zambezi Transfrontier Conservation Area.
