= Pomona Waste To Energy Power Station =

Power station in Zimbabwe

- Country: Zimbabwe
- Location: Pomona Landfill, Harare
- Coordinates: 17°43′33″S 31°04′47″E
- Status: Under construction
- Commission date: 2023 (expected)
- Construction cost: €304 million (US$344 million)
- Owner: Geogenix BV
- Operator: Geo Pomona Waste Management Private Limited

Thermal power station
- Primary fuel: Solid waste

Power generation
- Nameplate capacity: 22 MW (30,000 hp)

Pomona Waste To Energy Power Station, also Harare Solid Waste Plant, is a 22 MW (30,000 hp) solid waste-fired thermal power plant under development in Zimbabwe. The Harare City Council has awarded Geogenix BV, a Dutch waste management company, the concession contract to design, finance, construct, operate, maintain and own the power station for thirty years after commercial commissioning. As raw material, the power station is designed to use solid waste gathered from homes, businesses and industries in the city of Harare, the country's national capital. A 30-year power purchase agreement (PPA) has been signed between the developers of the power station and Zimbabwe Electricity Supply Authority (ZESA).

== Location ==
The power plant is under construction in the city of Harare, adjacent to the Pomona Landfill, on land leased to the power station developers, by the city of Harare. The landfill is located in a neighborhood called North Harare, approximately 13 kilometres (8 mi) northeast of the central business district of the city.

== Overview ==
The power station will charge the city of Harare US$40 for every tonne of garbage taken in. The table below illustrates the amount of waste supplied daily through the years, according to the supply contracts. The supply quantity would remain at 1,000 tonnes daily from year 5 through year 30.

Garbage intake at Pomona Waste To Energy Plant
Year	Daily intake (tonnes)	Annual income	Notes
1	550	8.03 million	
2	650	9.49 million	
3	750	10.95 million	
4	850	12.41 million	
5	1,000	14.6 million	

It is expected that the solid waste will be incinerated to produce heat. The heat will be used to boil water and produce steam. The steam will then be used to turn electric generators to produce electricity. The energy generated will be sold to the Zimbabwe Electricity Supply Authority (ZESA), for integration into the national grid.

== Ownership ==
The power station is owned and under development by Geogenix BV, a garbage management enterprise based in the Netherlands. Geogenix BV has formed a wholly owned Zimbabwean subsidiary, Geo Pomona Waste Management Private Limited, to design, build, finance, own, operate and maintain this power station for the first 30 years after commercial commissioning. After 30 years, ownership of the plant will revert to Harare City Council.

== Construction costs and timeline ==
The cost of construction has been reported as €304 million (US$344 million). Construction was expected to conclude in the second half of 2022 or in the first half of 2023.

== Associated benefits ==
This plant offers a sustainable solution to the disposal of solid waste, which is an increasing problem in the country and particularly in Harare. The feasibility study that preceded the approval of this project calculated the daily garbage dump at Pomona at 1,000 tonnes. Of that 57 percent was combustible and led to numerous daily fire outbreaks at the land fill. The project also adds 22 megawatts of electricity to the grid, reducing the electricity deficit and associated load-shedding.

An estimated workforce exceeding 300 will be hired to run the dumpsite and the power station during the next 30 years. This will boost the economy and social wellbeing of a cross-section of Zimbabweans.

== See also ==
- List of power stations in Zimbabwe
- Kakamega Waste To Energy Plant
- Sfax Waste To Methane Gas Project
- Dandora Waste to Energy Power Station
