= Chiredzi Solar Power Station =

Solar power station in Zimbabwe

- Country: Zimbabwe
- Location: Triangle, Chiredzi District, Masvingo Province
- Coordinates: 21°03′15″S 31°22′57″E
- Status: Under construction
- Construction began: September 2020 (Expected)
- Commission date: June 2021 (Expected)
- Owner: Triangle Solar System (TSS)

Solar farm
- Type: Flat-panel PV

Power generation
- Nameplate capacity: 90 MW (120,000 hp)

The Chiredzi Solar Power Station is a 90 MW (120,000 hp) solar power plant under development in Zimbabwe. The project is rated as one of the largest single investments by a local company in Masvingo Province since independence in 1980.

== Location ==
The power station is located in Chiredzi District, in Masvingo Province, along the 81.5 kilometres (51 mi) Ngundu–Triangle Road. It would sit on 241 hectares (596 acres) of land, about 66 kilometres (41 mi), by road, east of the town of Ngundu and approximately 15.5 kilometres (10 mi) west of the town of Triangle. Triangle is located about 27 kilometres (17 mi) west of Chiredzi, the district headquarters.

== Overview ==
The power station is designed to have a capacity of 90 megawatts, developed in two phases of 45 megawatts each. Its output is expected to be sold directly to the Zimbabwe Electricity Transmission and Distribution Company (ZETDC) for integration into the national grid, under a long-term power purchase agreement.

== Developers ==
The power station is being developed by a Zimbabwean power development consortium called Triangle Solar System (TSS). TSS is headed by Paradzai Chakona, a businessman and the area member of parliament and was granted a generation licence on 22 May 2020 by the Zimbabwe Energy Regulatory Authority (ZERA).

== Construction costs, and commissioning ==
The construction costs have been budgeted at US$88.1 million. This investment would cover land acquisition, land preparation, hardware, infrastructure, grid connection and civil works. The project is expected to create in excess of 300 temporary and permanent jobs.

The construction was expected to begin in September 2020, with plant commissioning planned for the first half of 2021. TSS plans to build other solar power plants in the country, to alleviate the ongoing power shortage in Zimbabwe.

== See also ==
- List of power stations in Zimbabwe
