= Jospong Group =

Ghanaian business conglomerate

- Company type: Private Conglomerate
- Industry: Investments
- Founded: 1995; 31 years ago
- Headquarters: Accra, Ghana
- Key people: Joseph Siaw Agyepong; Executive Chairman
- Products: ICT, sanitation, insurance, banking, real estate, domestic services, manufacturing, construction, automobile sales, logistics, agriculture, agro-processing etc.
- Website: Homepage

The Jospong Group of Companies, commonly referred to as the Jospong Group, is a privately owned conglomerate in Ghana. Joseph Siaw Agyepong, a Ghanaian businessman, is the founder of the group and is a shareholder in each of the companies in the Group. He serves as the executive chairman of the group.

== Overview ==
As of June 2026, Jospong Group is a "diversified holding company", with active subsidiaries in Africa and Asia. The group has interests in at least 14 economic sectors with majority of activity in waste management.

With over 60 subsidiary companies, the group subsidiaries are grouped into five clusters. The group's business affairs are controlled by an Apex Board. Each of the five business clusters are overseen by a chief operating officer (COO), with an Apex COO overseeing all five clusters.

== History ==
The group started as a printing press circa 1995, according to Ghanaian sources. Zoomlion Ghana Limited, which initially focused on waste management services, is one of the earlier companies to be established. The group continued to diversify and as of March 2024 it comprised over 60 diverse companies. The group's businesses include waste management, construction, real estate, logistics, finance, and manufacturing among others.

== Jospong Group clusters ==
Administratively, the group's businesses are grouped into the following five clusters:

Environment and Sanitation

This is the largest cluster, accounting for 60 percent of the group's operations. The Group collaborates with other entities in the Africa, Middle East and Asia regions, in the sectors of water supply and sanitation.

Commercial and Allied Services

This is the second-largest cluster and is responsible for 16 percent of group profits.

Technical and Logistics

This cluster comprises 13 subsidiary companies as of February 2023.

Information and Communication Technology

The subsidiary companies in this cluster include (a) Melchia Investment Centers (b) Subah Infosolution (c) DocuPro and (d) Data Bank.

Financial Services

The Jospong Group is an investor in OmniBSIC Bank, Millenium Insurance, Cosmopolitan Insurance, Union Capital and two other financial services companies.

== Developments ==
=== Waste management ===
In February 2024, the Lagos State government signed a memorandum of understanding (MOU) with the Jospong Group for the latter to handle the solid and fluid waste generated in the state. Lagos State, with a population of approximately 17.6 million inhabitants generates an estimated 13,000 tonnes of solid and liquid waste everyday according to the Lagos Waste Management Agency (Lawma).

On 8 October 2024, Kabuye Kyofatogabye, the Ugandan state minister for the capital city authority (KCCA), symbolically handed over the Kiteezi Landfill to Joseph Agyempong, the executive chairman of the Jospong Group so that the group would start a recycling and fertilizer plant at the site. Physical work is expected to begin in March 2025.

=== Automobile distributorship ===
In March 2024, Jospong Group signed an agreement with VinFast, a Vietnamese manufacturer of electric automobiles, assigning Jospong as the exclusive distributor of those vehicles in Ghana and West Africa.

== Jospong Internship Program ==
The group, together with Harvard University conduct a summer program referred to as the "Jospong Internship Program", lasting eight weeks from early June until early August. The competitive program is open to Harvard undergraduates in either Year 3 (Juniors) or Year 4 (Seniors).

== See also ==
- List of conglomerates in Africa
