= Dandora Waste To Energy Power Station =

Kenyan power station

- Official name: Dandora Waste To Energy Power Station
- Country: Kenya
- Location: Dandora, Nairobi
- Coordinates: 01°13′28″S 37°02′01″E
- Status: Proposed
- Construction began: 2023 Expected
- Commission date: 2024 Expected
- Construction cost: USD 197 million
- Owner: Kenya Ministry of Energy

Thermal power station
- Primary fuel: Municipal Solid Waste

Power generation
- Nameplate capacity: 45 MW

The Dandora Waste To Energy Power Station, also Nairobi Waste To Energy Power Station, is a planned 45 megawatts waste-fired thermal power plant in the city of Nairobi, the capital of Kenya. The power station is owned and is under development by Kenya Ministry of Energy. Feasibility studies will inform the design of the power plant. The energy generated here will be sold to Kenya Power and Lighting Company, for integration into the Kenyan grid.

== Location ==
The power plant will occupy real estate adjacent to Nairobi Sewage Treatment Works, in Ruai, in extreme northeastern Nairobi County, close to the border with Kiambu County. This is approximately 20 kilometres (12 mi) by road, east of the Dandora Dumping Site, the largest waste dumpsite in the country.

== History ==
Nairobi, Kenya's capital city, had an estimated population of 4.5 million people, as of February 2019. The Dandora waste dumpsite sits on 12 hectares (30 acres) of real estate in the Dandora neighborhood, a suburb of the city. This dumpsite receives a daily load, estimated between 2,000 and 3,000 tonnes of solid waste, from Nairobi's homes, businesses and industry. The dumpsite already holds approximately 1.8 million tonnes of waste, more than three times the 500,000 metric tonnes it was designed to hold.

In July 2021, following a lawsuit filed by residents near the dumpsite, a Nairobi court ordered the Nairobi Metropolitan Services (NMS), the entity running Nairobi County at that time, to close down the dumpsite within six months and clean it up after closure.

== Overview ==
It is envisaged that the Kenya Ministry of Energy will build and own this power station, on land owned by Nairobi County and administered by NMS. Kenya Electricity Generating Company will operate and maintain the power station. As of February 2022, the plan had been presented to the Cabinet of Kenya for approval and funding. In June 2022, it was reported that a consortium comprising Hitachi Zosen Inova based in Switzerland and Sintmond Group based in Kenya was working with the Kenyan authorities to develop this power station.

== Preparation for construction ==
In February 2022, the Daily Nation reported that the pre-requite feasibility study, expected to take six months was being planned. Also, the approval of the Cabinet of Kenya was awaited, in order for construction to start. The newspaper confirmed that the site was to be in Ruai, on account of the court order to relocate from Dandora.

In September 2023, following another lawsuit by a resident of the Dandora neighborhood, the project was put on "temporary hold" in order to obtain "neighborhood participation". At that time, the project owners had selected China National Electric Engineering Company (CNEEC) as the engineering, procurement and construction (EPC) contractor. In May 2024, the court case was dismissed and the project was allowed to proceed.

== Cost of construction ==
In November 2021, the construction cost was reported as approximately US$197 million.

== Developments ==
Following feasibility and impact studies that were concluded in 2023, Eni, the Italian energy multinational conglomerate expressed interest in developing this energy infrastructure project and at four other dumpsites in the country. It awaits regulatory approvals, including from the government of Kenya and the city of Nairobi.

== See also ==
- List of power stations in Kenya
- Kinshasa Thermal Power Station
- Kibo Gauteng Thermal Power Station
- Kakamega Waste To Energy Plant
- Pomona Waste To Energy Power Station
