= BSIC Group =

Financial services group based in Libya

Coordinates: 32.8577°N 13.0894°E

- Industry: Banking
- Founded: 1999; 27 years ago
- Headquarters: Tripoli, Libya
- Key people: Alhad Mohamed Alwarfalli; Président Directeur Général
- Products: Banking services financial services
- Website: www.bsicbank.com

The Banque Sahélo-Saharienne pour l'Investissement et le Commerce (lit. 'Sahel-Sahara Bank for Investment and Trade') or BSIC Group is a public multinational commercial bank and investment bank. Established in 1999, it is headquartered in Tripoli, Libya, and owned by the governments of its 14 participating, namely Benin, Burkina Faso, Central African Republic, Chad, the Gambia, Ghana, Guinea, Ivory Coast, Mali, Niger, Senegal, Togo, and Sudan together with Libya. Its main currency is the euro.

== Overview ==
The BSIC was formed in 1999 at the initiative of Muammar Gaddafi, a year after the Community of Sahel–Saharan States, as an instrument of his leadership ambitions in that region. It opened most of its national subsidiaries in subsequent years, e.g. in Burkina Faso in 2004 and in Togo in 2005. The Libyan parent entity, known as BSIC Siège, had no local banking operations of its own.

By 2013, BSIC Group was looking for an external financial partner to shore up its balance sheet, but eventually remained owned by the participating governments. Following successive recapitalizations in response to poor financial performance, however, the balance between these evolved over time and BSIC came under increasingly direct Libyan equity control, so that the government of Libya owned 56 percent of its equity by the late 2010s, followed by Sudan with 10 percent.

In 2019, to meet increased capital requirements, BSIC merged its Ghanaian subsidiary with local peer OmniBank Ghana Ltd to form OmniBSIC Bank. By the early 2020s, the BSIC Group was again on a path of dynamic growth.

== See also ==
- List of banks in Africa
