= OmniBSIC Bank =

Commercial bank in Ghana

Coordinates: 05°36′31″N 00°12′31″W

OmniBSIC Bank Ghana Limited
- Company type: Private
- Industry: Banking
- Founded: March 4, 2020; 6 years ago
- Headquarters: Accra, Ghana
- Key people: Teresa Effie Cooke; Chairman; Daniel Asiedu; Managing Director and CEO
- Products: Loans, savings, checking, investments, debit cards, credit cards, mortgages
- Revenue: ▲Aftertax: GHS:121,193,000 (approx. US$7.76 million) (2023)
- Total assets: GHS:5.682 billion (approx. US$363.76 million) (2023)
- Number of employees: 829 (2025)
- Website: https://omnibsic.com.gh/

OmniBSIC Bank Ghana Limited is a commercial bank in Ghana that is licensed by the Bank of Ghana, the central bank and national banking regulator.

It was created by the merger of the erstwhile Omni Bank Ghana Limited and BSIC Ghana Bank Limited.

== Location ==
The headquarters of the bank and its main branch, are located at Atlantic Tower, Airport City, in Accra, Ghana's capital. As of April 2020, the geographical coordinates of OmniBSIC Bank's headquarters are:05°36'31.0"N, 0°12'31.0"W (Latitude:5.608611; Longitude:-0.208611).

== Overview ==
OmniBSIC Bank Ghana Limited is a retail bank that serves large corporations, small and medium enterprises, individuals and non-governmental organisations in Ghana. As of December 2023, the bank's total assets were GHS:5.682 billion (approx. US$363.76 million), with shareholders' equity of GHS:491.6 million (approx. US$31.5 million). As of 2019, the bank served over 125,000 customers at 46 brick-and mortar branches and employed 614 permanent staff members. The Jospong Group is an investor in OmniBSIC Bank.

== History ==
In September 2017, the Bank of Ghana directed all universal banks in Ghana to raise their minimum capital reserves from GHS:120 million (US$22.8 million) to GHS:400 million (US$73.4 million). Institutions that couldn't raise the funds internally or from shareholders, could (a) merge (b) exit the Ghanaian banking business (Bank of Baroda (Ghana)) (c) downsize to a savings and loan institution or (c) consolidate (Consolidated Bank Ghana).

OmniBank Ghana and Sahel Sahara Bank (BSIC) decided to merge to form OmniBSIC Bank Ghana Limited, effective 4 March 2020.

== Branches ==
The bank's headquarters are located at: PMB CT 212 Cantonments, Ghana. The bank maintains a networked chain of 43 branches in major urban areas of the country.

== Governance ==
Teresa Effie Cooke is the chairman of the board of directors. Daniel Asiedu serves as the chief executive officer of the bank.

== See also ==
- List of banks in Ghana
- List of companies of Ghana
- Economy of Ghana
