= Umguza District =

Administrative district in Zimbabwe

- administrative district
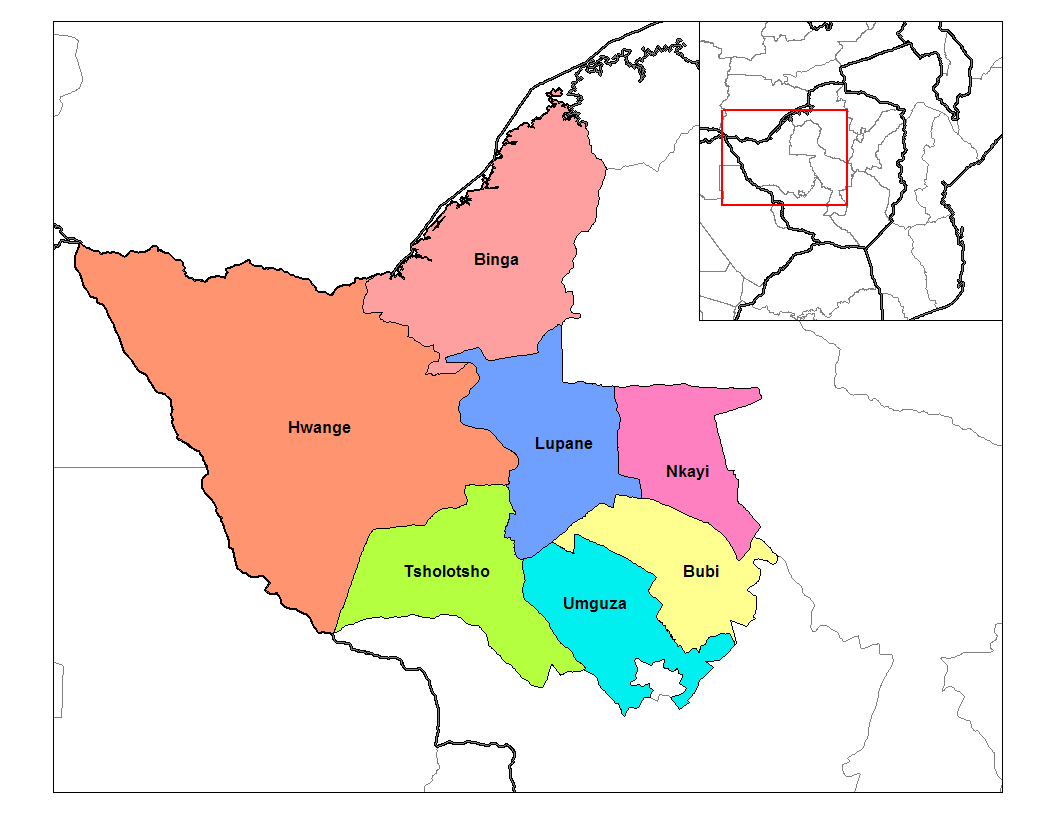
- Umguza District in Matabeleland North
- Coordinates: 20°04′S 28°35′E
- Country: Zimbabwe
- Province: Matabeleland North

Area
  - Total: 8,374.78 km^{2} (3,233.52 sq mi)

Population (2022)
  - Total: 113,265
- Time zone: UTC+2 (CAT)

Umguza is a district in the southern part of Matabeleland North province in Zimbabwe. It was formerly known as Esiphezini District.

== Geography ==
Umguza District is bounded by Matobo and Umzingwane districts in the southeast, Bulilima and Tsholotsho in the west, Kusile (formerly part of Lupane District) in the north and Bubi in the north and east. It surrounds the Bulawayo metropolitan area to the south on three sides.

== Places in Umguza ==
- Ntabazinduna (Hill of the Chiefs)
- Nyamandlovu a river valley where garden crops are raised.

== Administration and politics ==
Umguza District is governed by the Umguza Rural District Council, which has its offices in Bulawayo. The district has one constituency, Umguza constituency, which was created out of the old Bubi-Umguza constituency. The constituency consists of the Nyamandlovu and Sawmills areas divided into fifteen wards.

Obert Moses Mpofu was elected in 1990 and 1995 as the member of parliament from Bubi-Umguza Constituency, the predecessor constituency. In 2008 and in 2013 he filled the parliamentary seat for the Umguza constituency. He did not run in 2018.

== Economy ==
The climate in the district is arid and the primary occupation is animal ranching. Among recent problems are "land barons" establishing illegal settlements, established without any concern for services such as water and electricity.

In the 2000s and early 2010s, about a dozen farmers in the district grew tobacco on a commercial basis. However due to climate change, the rains became erratic and transport of the crop to the auction house in Harare, nearly 400 kilometres (249 mi) away became too expensive. As of 2019, there was no commercial tobacco farmer in Umguza District.

== Energy ==
In July 2021, AF Power Private Limited an independent power producer (IPP) based in Singapore announced plans to design, develop, operate and maintain a 200 megawatt solar power plant, in Umguza District. The Umguza Solar Power Station, which will be built in phases in expected to add the first 50 megawatts to the national grid during 2022.
