= Kibo Gauteng Thermal Power Station =

Thermal power station in South Africa

Kibo Gauteng Thermal Power Station Kibo Gauteng Thermal Power Station (South Africa)
- Country: South Africa
- Location: Gauteng Industrial Park, Gauteng
- Status: Proposed
- Construction began: 2022 Expected
- Commission date: 2023 Expected
- Construction cost: US$12 million
- Owner: Sustineri Energy
- Operator: Sustineri Energy

Thermal power station
- Primary fuel: Plastics

Power generation
- Nameplate capacity: 2.7 MW (3,600 hp)

Kibo Gauteng Thermal Power Station is a planned 2.7 megawatts (3,600 hp) thermal power station in South Africa. The power station is under development by a joint venture company called Sustineri Energy, co-owned by Kibo Energy, an Irish IPP and Industrial Green Energy Solutions (IGES) of South Africa. The energy generated here will be sold directly to a developer of industrial parks, based in Gauteng, South Africa, under a 10-year power purchase agreement (PPA) between the parties.

== Location ==
The power station would be located in Gauteng Industrial Park, in Gauteng Province, where both Johannesburg, the country's business centre and Pretoria, South Africa's capital city are located.

== Overview ==
The power station is being developed to supply baseline electricity to a developer of industrial parks in Gauteng Province, South Arica. The process involves the incineration of selected plastic waste at above 400 °C (752 °F) in the absence of oxygen, in a process called pyrolysis. This produces synthetic gas (syngas) and heat. The syngas is used to drive generators to produce electricity and the heat is sold to other industries in the industrial park.

It is anticipated that in 24 to 26 months, business will have picked up to warrant the expansion of the power station, tripling its output to 8 megawatts.

== Developers ==
The owners/developers of this energy infrastructure have formed a joint venture company, named Sustineri Energy, which will own, design, finance, develop, build, operate and maintain this power station. The table below illustrates the shareholding in Sustineri Energy.

Shareholding In Sustineri Energy
Rank	IPP/Developer	Domicile	% Ownership	Notes
1	Kibo Energy Plc	Ireland	65.0	
2	Industrial Green Energy Solutions Pty	South Africa	35.0	

== Construction and timeline ==
The construction of the power station is budgeted at ZAR:180 million (approx. US$12 million). Construction is expected to start in the second half of 2022 and last about 12 to 14 months. The engineering, procurement and construction (EPC) contract was awarded to Lesedi of South Africa. The same company was also selected as the "operations and management contractor".

== See also ==
- List of power stations in South Africa
- Kinshasa Thermal Power Station
- Dandora Waste to Energy Power Station
