= Wankie coal mine disaster =

1972 colliery accident in Zimbabwe

Coordinates: 18.3564°S 26.4294°E

- Location of Rhodesia, now Zimbabwe
- Date: June 6, 1972
- Location: Wankie, Rhodesia
- Outcome: 426 killed, 8 survivors

The Wankie coal mine disaster took place on 6 June 1972 when a series of underground explosions occurred at the Wankie No. 2 colliery in Rhodesia (now known as Zimbabwe), which was owned by the Anglo-American Corporation. With 427 fatalities, it remains the deadliest mine accident to date in the country's history.

The disaster took place at the Wankie No.2 colliery in Wankie, (now known as Hwange) in the Rhodesian province of Matabeleland North, when several gas explosions ripped through the mine. It was initially believed that 468 miners were trapped, but the number was lowered after the owners found a number of people had not shown up for work.

Eight men were pulled alive from the mine after the initial explosions. Two new explosions on 7 June poured clouds of poisonous gas into the 3 miles (4.8 kilometers) of tunnels, making further rescue attempts impossible.

On 9 June, the general manager of the Wankie colliery, Gordon Livingstone-Blevins, decided to leave the 424 bodies where they were. Three bodies had been recovered after the initial explosions. A mass memorial service took place on 11 June at a nearby football stadium, where a crowd of about 5,000 people paid tribute. "This has cast a gloom over the whole country," Rhodesian Prime Minister Ian Smith said during the service.

In response to the disaster, the President of Rhodesia Clifford Dupont set up the Wankie Disaster Relief Fund
