= Batoka Gorge Hydroelectric Power Station =

MW hydroelectric power station

Batoka Gorge Dam
- Location within Zimbabwe
- Country: Zambia/Zimbabwe
- Coordinates: 17°55′11″S 26°07′51″E
- Purpose: Power
- Status: Proposed

Dam and spillways
- Type of dam: Arch gravity
- Impounds: Zambezi River
- Height: 181 m (594 ft)
- Width (crest): 12 m (39 ft)
- Width (base): 97.8 m (321 ft)
- Spillway capacity: 20,000 m^{3}/s (710,000 cu ft/s)

Reservoir
- Total capacity: 1,680×10^{6} m^{3} (1,360,000 acre⋅ft)
- Catchment area: 508,000 km^{2} (196,000 sq mi)

Power Station
- Turbines: 12 x 200 MW Francis-type
- Installed capacity: 2400 MW

The proposed Batoka Gorge Hydroelectric Power Station is a 2400 MW hydroelectric power station, planned for the Zambezi River on the international border between Zambia and Zimbabwe.

== Location ==
The proposed power station will be located on the Zambezi River, approximately 54 kilometres (34 mi), downstream of Victoria Falls, straddling the international border between Zambia and Zimbabwe.

== Overview ==
Currently, the proposal is for two power plants, each with an installed capacity of 1200 MW; one on the Zambian side and another on the Zimbabwean side. The dam to supply the reservoir with water will be a 181 metres (594 ft) tall arch-gravity type.

The project is being implemented by the Zambezi River Authority, a bi-national organization mandated to operate, monitor and maintain the Kariba Dam complex as well as exploit the full potential of the Zambezi River.

== Community resistance ==
As in the proposal in the 1990s that was stopped, and now, again, stakeholders and the local community are strongly opposed to the dam's construction. Despite opposition, in June 2019, the Zambian and Zimbabwean governments signed a deal to build the dam with General Electric and a Chinese company, Power China. In 2023, Zambia canceled the contract, citing high costs and failure to follow proper procurement procedures. In September 2023, UNESCO granted permission for the dam project to proceed even with critics' environmental and tourism concerns.

The tourism industry generated by the current Batoka Gorge, including its whitewater rafting, employs thousands of local individuals, both directly and indirectly, and has been acknowledged as the third largest contributor to Zambia's economy. Detractors of the dam have concerns about the impact on the region’s white-water rapids enterprises. Critics argue the dam poses a flooding threat to the river rapids. Zambezi whitewater rapids tours are renowned for being among the best commercially operated day and multi-day trips worldwide. Rafting trips on the Zambezi draw thousands of global tourists annually, in both the wet and dry seasons. If the proposal moves forward, the rafting industry will lose an estimated $4 million annually.

The forming of a narrow, deep-water reservoir behind the dam is expected to have local ecosystem consequences. Concerns over the lake’s ability to sustain large fish populations threaten area fishing tourism. Some dam proponents suggest it could open up new tourism opportunities, such as parasailing and wakeboarding. However, the presence of dangerous animals like hippos and crocodiles in flat waters raises safety concerns. The Zambezi basin is known for providing various ecosystem services. Constructing the dam is anticipated to have lasting effects on the region, particularly the nature tourism industry.

There is some doubt that the dam will fulfil its stated aim of providing electricity to rural communities, as it will be connected to the Southern African Power Pool. The dam could also cause the river to back up to within 650 metres of Victoria Falls, according to an article published in Zambezia. This would violate the preservation boundary below the falls, which is 12 km according to UNESCO World Heritage Site agreements. Thus, if the dam proposal moves forward, Victoria Falls could become a World Heritage in Danger.

These perspectives are part of the ongoing debate surrounding the proposed dam and the potential consequences.

== Construction costs ==
As of July 2018, the projected cost of development was estimated at US$4.5 billion. General Electric Africa has expressed interest in developing this power station under the design-build-operate-transfer arrangement, but with ownership reverting to Zambia and Zimbabwe, after the developers have recovered their investment plus profits.

In June 2019, Bloomberg News reported that the construction contract had been awarded to a consortium comprising General Electric of the United States and Power Construction Corporation of China (PowerChina). Construction is expected to take from ten to thirteen years.

Zambia announced it was canceling the 2019 PowerChina contract in 2024 due to irregular procurement procedures.

== See also ==
- List of power stations in Zambia
- List of power stations in Zimbabwe
