= Hwange Colliery =

Coal mining company in Zimbabwe

Hwange Colliery Company Limited
- Type: Open Cast and underground coal mine
- Traded as: ZSE: HCCL
- Industry: Mining
- Founded: 1899
- Headquarters: Hwange
- Products: Coal
- Website: http://hwangecolliery.co.zw

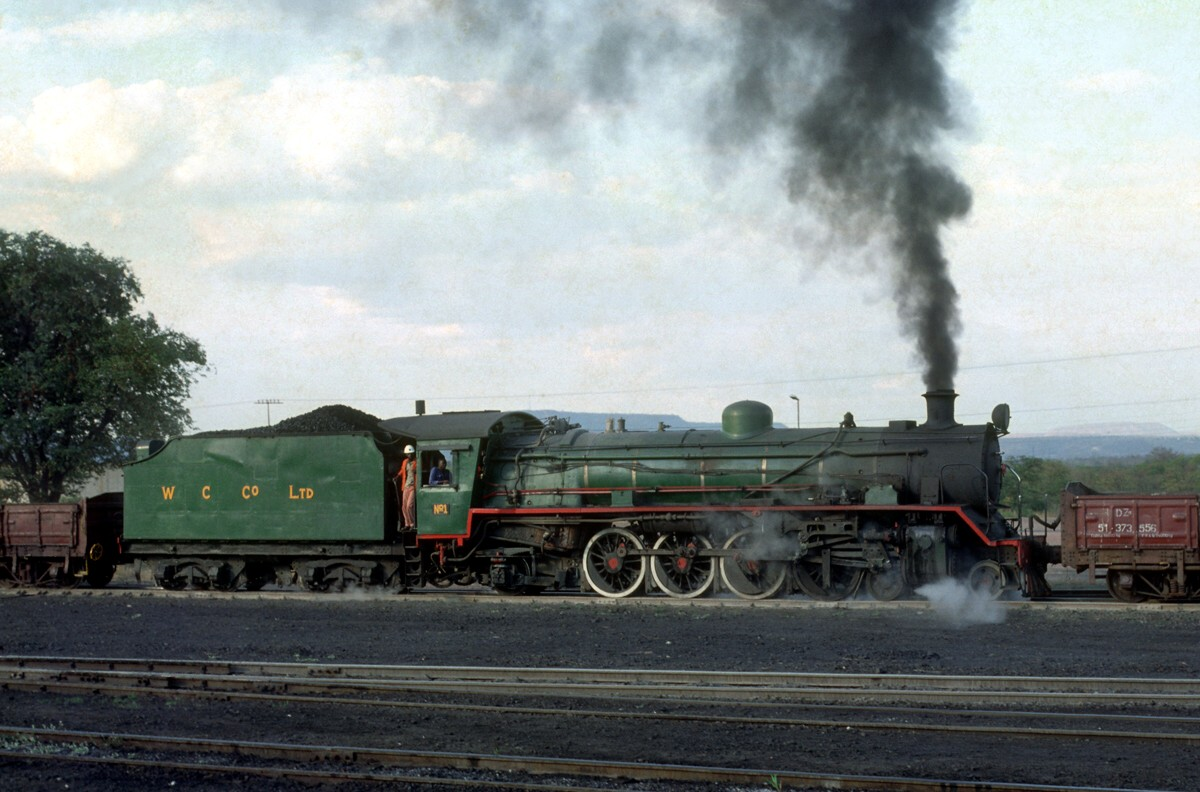
Wankie Coal locomotive No. 1

Hwange Colliery Company Limited (formerly Wankie Colliery Company Limited) is the name of a company in Zimbabwe (formerly Rhodesia) and of its associated coal mining, processing and marketing. It was founded in 1899. Its mines are near Hwange (known as Wankie until 1982) in the province of Matabeleland North. The town developed from coal mining.

The company's headquarters are in Hwange; its registered office is in the capital Harare; and there is a regional office in Bulawayo. Its stock is listed on the Zimbabwe Stock Exchange and is a component of its stock index, the Zimbabwe Mining Index. It is also listed on the London Stock Exchange and the Johannesburg Stock Exchange.

Coal transportation is by road and rail. The company owns its own railway system. Handover station to NRZ is Thomson Junction. The company operates an open cast mine and an underground mine.

In the Wankie coal mine disaster on June 6, 1972, there were a series of underground explosions at the Wankie No. 2 colliery, which was owned by the Anglo-American Corporation.

Deaths in the Wankie coal mine disaster
Total deaths	426
Africans	390
Europeans	36
By nationality:
Rhodesians	176
Zambians	91
Mozambique	52
Malawi	37
Tanzania	30
Britons	14
South West Africa	13
South Africans	12
Botswana	1

The disaster provoked reaction throughout the world, and messages of sympathy poured in from all quarters, including from Queen Elizabeth; Alec Douglas-Home, the British Foreign Secretary; The Pope; and the Prime Minister of South Africa, B. J. Vorster. It remains the deadliest mine accident to date in the country's history.
