= Seke (constituency) =

Zimbabwean parliamentary constituency

- Constituency for the National Assembly of Zimbabwe
- Province: Mashonaland East
- Region: Seke District

Current constituency
- Number of members: 1
- Party: ZANU–PF
- Member: Willard Madzimbamuto

Seke is a constituency represented in the National Assembly of the Parliament of Zimbabwe, located in Seke District in Mashonaland East Province. Its current MP since the 2023 election is Willard Madzimbamuto of ZANU–PF. Previously, the constituency was represented by ZANU–PF's Munyaradzi Kashambe following the 2018 election.

== See also ==
- List of Zimbabwean parliamentary constituencies
