= Kakamega Waste To Energy Plant =

Solid waste power station

- Kakamega Waste To Energy Plant
- Country: Kenya
- Location: Mung'ang'a, Mumias East Sub County, Kakamega County
- Coordinates: 0°22′05″N 34°34′21″E
- Status: Under construction
- Commission date: 2023 Expected
- Construction cost: US$53 million
- Owner: VR Holding AB
- Operator: VR Holding AB

Thermal power station
- Primary fuel: Solid waste

Power generation
- Nameplate capacity: 10 MW (13,000 hp)

Kakamega Waste To Energy Plant, also Kakamega Solid Waste Power Station, is a 10 MW (13,000 hp) solid waste-fired thermal power plant under development in Kenya. VR Holding AB, a Swedish energy company, has been awarded the concession contract to design, finance, construct, operate and maintain the power station. As raw material, the power station is designed to use solid waste gathered from homes, businesses and industries in Kakamega County and neighboring counties in south-western Kenya, including the counties of Bungoma, Busia, Homa Bay, Trans Nzoia, Vihiga and others.

== Location ==
The power plant is under construction in the village of Mung'ang'a, in Mumias East sub-county, Kakamega County, in southwestern Kenya. Mung'ang'a is located approximately 27 kilometres (17 mi), by road, northwest of Kakamega, the county headquarters. This is about 76 kilometres (47 mi), by road, northwest of Kisumu, the nearest large city.

The power station is located on a piece of real estate measuring 15 acres (6 ha), owned by the county, and availed to the power station's owner/developer, for the purpose of establishing this plant. The county leases the acreage to the developer, under a 25 year lease agreement.

== Overview ==
The power station is rated at 10 megawatts. An estimated 800 tonnes of solid waste is expected to be incinerated every 24 hours to produce heat. The heat will be used to boil water, producing steam. The steam will be used to turn electric generators to produce electricity. The energy generated will be sold to the Kenyan national electricity transmitter and distributor, Kenya Power and Lighting Company (Kenya Power), for distribution in Kakamega and neighboring counties.

The solid waste to supply the plant will be sourced from the counties in southwestern Kenya, as listed in this reference.

== Ownership ==
The power station is owned and under development by VR Holding AB, an enterprise based in Bastad, Sweden.

== Construction costs and timeline ==
The cost of construction has been quoted as US$53 million. Once construction starts, it is expected to take 9 months to commercial commissioning.

== Associated benefits ==
This plant offers a "sustainable solution" to the disposal of solid waste, which is an increasing problem in the region. The plant will avail cheaper electric power to Kakamega County, estimated by some at 50 percent of current market rates.The developer of the power plant will build a community health centre adjacent to the power station as part of the developer's CSR program. It is estimated that the project will provide over 1,000 jobs during its construction, operations and supply chain processes.

== See also ==
- List of power stations in Kenya
- Divo Biomass Power Station
- Sfax Waste To Methane Gas Project
- Dandora Waste to Energy Power Station
- Pomona Waste To Energy Power Station
