= Kinshasa Thermal Power Station =

Plastic waste-to-energy plant in the Democratic Republic of the Congo

Kinshasa Thermal Power Station Kinshasa Thermal Power Station (Democratic Republic of the Congo)
- Country: Democratic Republic of the Congo
- Location: Kinshasa
- Coordinates: 4°19′04″S 15°17′48″E
- Status: Proposed
- Construction began: 2022 Expected
- Commission date: 2023 Expected
- Construction cost: US$30 million
- Owner: Clean-Seas Inc.
- Operator: Clean-Seas Inc.

Thermal power station
- Primary fuel: Plastics

Power generation
- Nameplate capacity: 10 kW (13 hp)
- Annual net output: 0.096 GW·h

Kinshasa Thermal Power Station, also Kinshasa Plastics Waste–To–Energy Plant, is a planned plastics-fired thermal power plant in the city of Kinshasa, the capital of the Democratic Republic of the Congo, with an estimated population of 15 million inhabitants, as of August 2021. The waste-to-energy power station will, in the first phase, convert 200 tonnes of plastic waste everyday into "3,500 liters (770 imp gal; 925 U.S. gal) of industrial lubricants, 15,000 liters (3,300 imp gal; 3,963 U.S. gal) of diesel fuel, and three metric tonnes of char (solid carbon)" on a daily basis. In addition, it will in the process, generate 96 MWh of energy, on an annual basis. The power generated will be sold to the Congolese electricity utility company Société Nationale d'Électricité (SNEL), for intergradation into the national electricity grid.

== Location ==
The power station would be located in the city of Kinshasa, the national capital and largest city in the country.

== Overview ==
The plastics-to-energy industrial complex is under development, primarily to address the dire situation of plastic waste in the city of Kinshasa. As of August 2021, it was estimated that 9,000 tonnes of solid waste are generated in the city, every day, of which the majority is used plastics.

The owner/developers of this plant, plan to take 200 tonnes of used plastics every day and convert it into electricity, industrial lubricants, diesel fuel and solid carbon (char). The process involved is called pyrolysis, where the plastic waste is heated at a temperature above 400 °C (752 °F), in an environment starved of oxygen. The gases produced are then compressed and used to drive electricity generators. As the gases cool down the liquid products are distilled off, and the solid char is left behind.

== Developers ==
The power station is under development by Clean-Seas Inc., a "provider of waste management technology solutions", an American enterprise, based in the state of Delaware.

== Cost, funding and timetable ==
The construction budget is quoted as US$30 million (€25 million). Clean-Seas Inc. will design, develop, build, operate and maintain the power plant for 30 years after commissioning. The contracts include a guaranteed source of plastic waste for the entire 30 years. The development funding will be provided by Clean-Seas, with borrowed money from "development partners".

== See also ==
- List of power stations in the Democratic Republic of the Congo
- Kibo Gauteng Thermal Power Station
- Dandora Waste to Energy Power Station
