= Hwange Thermal Power Station =

Zimbabwean coal-fired electric power station

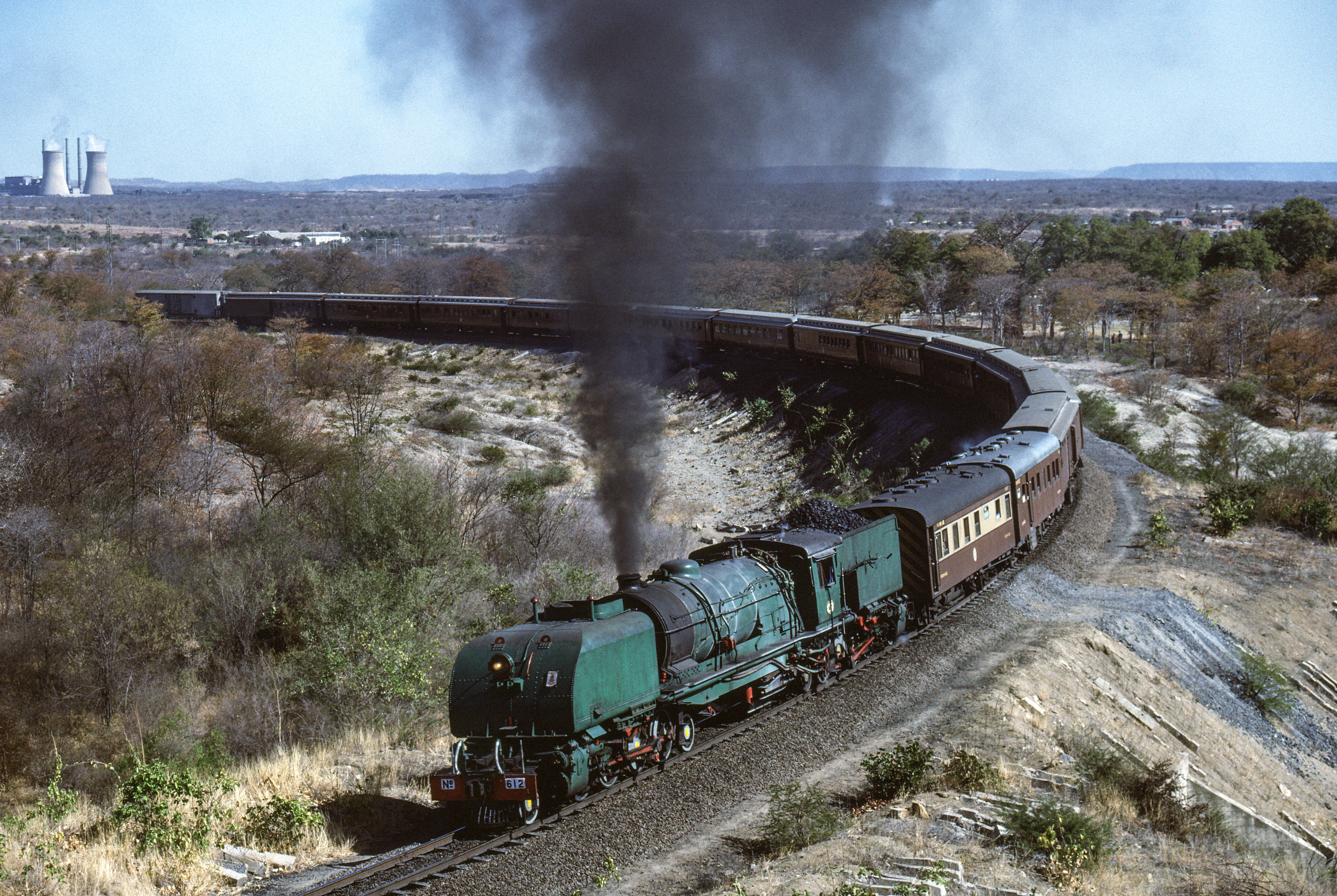
- Location of Hwange Thermal Power Station within Zimbabwe
- Country: Zimbabwe
- Location: Hwange
- Coordinates: 18°23′0.155″S 26°28′12.03″E
- Status: Operational
- Construction began: 1973
- Commission date: 1987
- Operator: ZESA

Thermal power station
- Primary fuel: Bituminous coal

Power generation
- Units operational: 4 x 120 MW; 2 x 220 MW; 2x 300 MW
- Make and model: ICAL; Babcock Power; MAN; Alstom; Ansaldo Energia
- Nameplate capacity: 1520 MW

The Hwange Thermal Power Station is the biggest power plant in Zimbabwe with an installed capacity of 1520 MW. It is owned and operated by the national electricity company Zimbabwe Electricity Supply Authority. It was built in two stages and consists of 4 units of 120 MW each, 2 units of 220 MW each and 2 units of 300 MW each. Engineering Consultants, Merz & McLellan, were employed for the design and supervision of the construction of the power station. Construction of Stage 1 commenced in 1973, but was suspended in 1975 due to economic sanctions imposed on Rhodesia. Stage 1's units were commissioned from 1983 to 1986 with Stage 2's units following in 1986 and 1987.

A reliable source of water lies further north, in the Zambezi River. From there, through a 44 kilometres (27 mi) long pipeline, water for the boilers and cooling towers is drawn by both high and low lift pumps to a storage reservoir located adjacent to the station and conveyed by gravity to the station. About 107,000 cubic metres (3,778,669 cu ft) of raw water can be provided every day. The demineralisation plant has a capacity of 5,420 cubic metres (191,405 cu ft) per day.

A conveyor belt that measures 3.5 kilometres (2.2 mi) long, brings about 1,750 tonnes (1,750,000 kg) of coal per hour from the nearby Wankie Colliery open cast mine, and 250,000 tonnes of coal are stockpiled on site. Coal reserves estimated to support 1,200 MW for an estimated 30 years are concealed beneath the vast expanse of the coal mine.

Technical problems due to neglect of maintenance, part replacement and upgrading make the plant prone to frequent production stops. In 2009, Namibia's NamPower made agreements to help ZESA to revive the plant's capacity in exchange for power deliveries. The extensive problems are however continuing and have even led the government to considering a full closure of the plant. In April 2008, Chadha Power of India secured a contract to refurbish four units at the power plant.

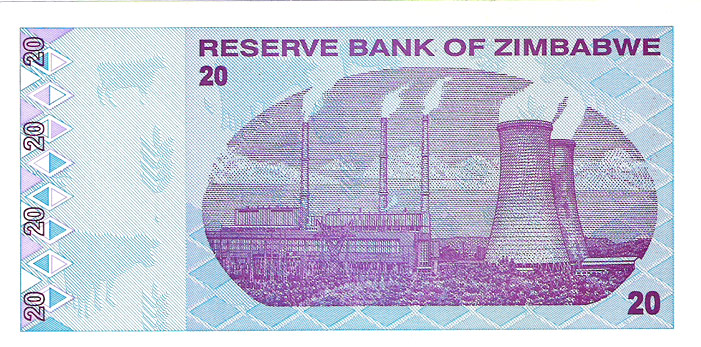
2009 $20 banknote

In December 2015 China agreed to provide a $1.2 billion loan to add 600 MW of generating capacity to the Hwange power station with two additional units.

The plant appeared on the 1994 $500, 2007 $200,000, and 2009 $20 and $50 Zimbabwe banknotes.

== Recent developments ==
As of July 2021, the upgrade of adding Unit 7 and Unit 8, each with capacity of 300 megawatts was about 68 percent complete, with commercial commissioning expected in 2022. The contract price of the upgrade is quoted as US$1.5 billion. In March 2022, the Zimbabwe Herald reported that work completion had progressed to 82 percent, as of then. As of August 2023 the Units 7 and 8 were operational.

== See also ==
- List of power stations in Zimbabwe
