= Sfax Waste To Methane Gas Project =

Waste to energy project in Tunisia

Sfax Waste To Methane Gas Plant
- Sfax Waste To Methane Gas Plant
- Country: Tunisia
- Location: Sfax, Sfax Governorate
- Coordinates: 34°44′18″N 10°46′49″E
- Status: Proposed
- Commission date: 2024 Expected
- Owner: Sfax Methane Consortium
- Operator: Sfax Methane Consortium

Thermal power station
- Primary fuel: Solid waste

The Sfax Waste To Methane Gas Project is a proposed plant to convert solid waste into methane gas, by the facilitation of anaerobic digestion of organic waste in a new plant in Sfax, Tunisia's second-largest city. The estimated 1,900,000 cubic meters (1.9×10^{9} L) of methane from the future waste-to-energy plant is expected to fuel a fleet of 800 automobile taxis every year. The project is a joint venture of four Tunisian government entities; (a) the City of Sfax (COS) (b) the National Oil Distribution Company (AGIL) (c) the National Agency for Energy Management (ANME) and the Commissariat à l’énergie atomique et aux énergies alternatives (CEA-PRO).

== Location ==
The waste-to-methane-gas plant is planned in the city of Sfax, in Sfax Governorate, along the Tunisian Mediterranean coast, approximately 267 kilometres (166 mi) southeast of Tunis the national capital and largest city.

== Overview ==
As of 2020, an estimated 75 percent of Tunisia's 11.7 million citizens were settled in urban and peri-urban settlements along the country's coastline. The solid waste generated in these communities was classified into three major categories: (a) food waste (FW) (b) green waste (GW) and (c) cattle manure (CM). An estimated 68 percent of all the solid waste in Tunisia is classified as organic waste.

Tunisia generates an estimated 2.6 million tonnes of solid waste, annually. An estimated 85 percent of this waste is disposed of in landfills, while most of the remainder is dumped in ad-hoc rubbish dumps. Due to a rapidly increasing urbanization rate, land for landfills and rubbish dumps is becoming scarce. In addition, these temporary solutions have long-term problems of their own, including unregulated pollutant gaseous emissions and liquid leachate effluent.

The problem in Tunisia has reached national crisis proportions, as many of the existing landfills are filling up, with nowhere to put new waste.

== Ownership ==
The new plant is under ownership by a consortium of Tunisian government parastatals as well as local government entities, as listed in the table below. For descriptive purposes, we will refer to the consortium as Sfax Methane Consortium.

Sfax Waste To Methane Gas Plant Ownership
Rank	Owner/Investor	Percentage	Notes
1	Sfax City Council		
2	National Oil Distribution Company (AGIL)		
3	National Agency for Energy Management (ANME)		
4	Commissariat à l’énergie atomique et aux énergies alternatives (CEA-PRO)		

== Construction costs and timeline ==
The owners/developers plan to conduct feasibility and environmental and social impact studies to inform the design, size and cost of construction of the plant. The feasibility and ESIA studies are budgeted at €555,000 (US$614,000). An EPC contractor will be selected after the environmental and feasibility studies.

== Associated benefits ==
This plant offers a "sustainable solution" to the disposal of solid waste, which is an increasing problem in the country. The plant will avail industrial methane to approximately 800 taxis fitted with methane use technology and driven within Sfax and its metropolis. The new plant is expected to take in 50,000 tons of household waste annually to produce the methane for use as fuel in taxis. The feasibility studies will highlight the number of jobs that will be created during the planning, construction and operational stages of the project.

== See also ==
- List of power stations in Tunisia
- Kakamega Waste To Energy Plant
