= Hwange =

Hwange Wankie
- Location within Zimbabwe
- Coordinates: 18°21′53″S 26°30′00″E
- Country: Zimbabwe
- Province: Matabeleland North
- District: Hwange District
- City: Hwange Municipality
- Highest elevation: 770 m (2,530 ft)

Population (2022 census)
  - Total: 21,300
- Time zone: UTC+2 (CAT)
- Climate: BSh

Hwange, previously known as Wankie, is a town in Zimbabwe, located in Hwange District, in Matabeleland North Province, in northwestern Zimbabwe, close to the international borders with Botswana and Zambia. It lies approximately 100 kilometres (62 mi), by road, southeast of Victoria Falls, the nearest large city. The town lies on the railway line from Bulawayo, Zimbabwe's second-largest city, to Victoria Falls. Hwange sits at an elevation of 770 metres (2,530 ft), above sea level.

== Overview ==
The town houses the offices of Hwange Town Council, as well as the headquarters of Hwange District Administration. Hwange and the surrounding countryside is a centre for the industry in Zimbabwe. Hwange Colliery is the largest in the country, with proven reserves that are estimated to last over 1,000 years, at current production levels. The Wankie Coal Field, one of the largest in the world, was discovered here in 1895 by the American Scout Frederick Russell Burnham. Today the coal for the whole country is transported by the mining railway to Thomson Junction, where it is handed over to the National Railways of Zimbabwe (NRZ) for onward transmission. In 2010, Botswana, Zimbabwe and Mozambique signed an agreement to develop a railway for the export of coal to Technobanine Point near Maputo. The cost per tonne of rail transport to the coast amounts to ten times the cost of extraction.

Hwange is also a tourism centre due to the presence of the nearby Hwange National Park, the largest National Park in Zimbabwe. The national park is home to a vast number of elephant, giraffe, lion and other wildlife. Royal Bank Zimbabwe, a commercial bank, maintains a branch in the town. Zimbabwe's biggest power plant, Hwange Thermal Power Station, was built here in the 1980s.

== History ==
The town is named after the chieftain of Whange, who is now called Chief Hwange. The town was known as Wankie until 1982.

=== Wankie Coal Mine Disaster ===
In June 1972, the deadliest mining disaster in the country's history took place when an underground explosion occurred in Wankie No.2 Colliery. Four hundred and twenty-seven miners lost their lives; three hundred and ninety-one Africans and thirty-six Europeans. Apart from the one hundred and seventy-six Rhodesians who died, there were ninety-one Zambians, fifty-two from Mozambique, thirty-seven from Malawi, thirty Tanzanians, thirteen from South West Africa, and one from Botswana.

== Population ==
Hwange's population was recorded as 42,581 during Zimbabwe's 1992 census. As of the 2022 census, the town has a population of 21,300.

== Climate ==
Climate data for Hwange (1961–1990)
Month	Jan	Feb	Mar	Apr	May	Jun	Jul	Aug	Sep	Oct	Nov	Dec	Year
Mean daily maximum °C (°F)	29.2 (84.6)	28.9 (84.0)	28.8 (83.8)	27.9 (82.2)	26.2 (79.2)	24.0 (75.2)	24.1 (75.4)	26.9 (80.4)	30.9 (87.6)	32.1 (89.8)	31.7 (89.1)	29.7 (85.5)	28.4 (83.1)
Mean daily minimum °C (°F)	18.1 (64.6)	17.7 (63.9)	16.8 (62.2)	13.4 (56.1)	8.7 (47.7)	4.9 (40.8)	4.6 (40.3)	7.2 (45.0)	12.1 (53.8)	16.0 (60.8)	17.5 (63.5)	18.0 (64.4)	12.9 (55.2)
Average rainfall mm (inches)	145.1 (5.71)	128.9 (5.07)	57.1 (2.25)	20.3 (0.80)	2.6 (0.10)	0.1 (0.00)	0.0 (0.0)	0.6 (0.02)	1.6 (0.06)	21.4 (0.84)	55.8 (2.20)	126.5 (4.98)	560.0 (22.05)
Average rainy days	12	10	7	3	1	0	0	0	1	3	7	12	56
Source: World Meteorological Organization

== Sports ==
First-class cricket has been played in Hwange at the well established cricket venue located in the town, the Tom Kenton Oval, home of the Hwange (Wankie) cricket club, earlier called the Wankie Oval.

Hwange Colliery (formerly known as Wankie Colliery) is a Hwange-based soccer team.

== See also ==
- Districts of Zimbabwe
- Provinces of Zimbabwe
- Odilo Weeger
