= Victoria Falls, Zimbabwe =

Resort City in Matabeleland North, Zimbabwe

Victoria Falls
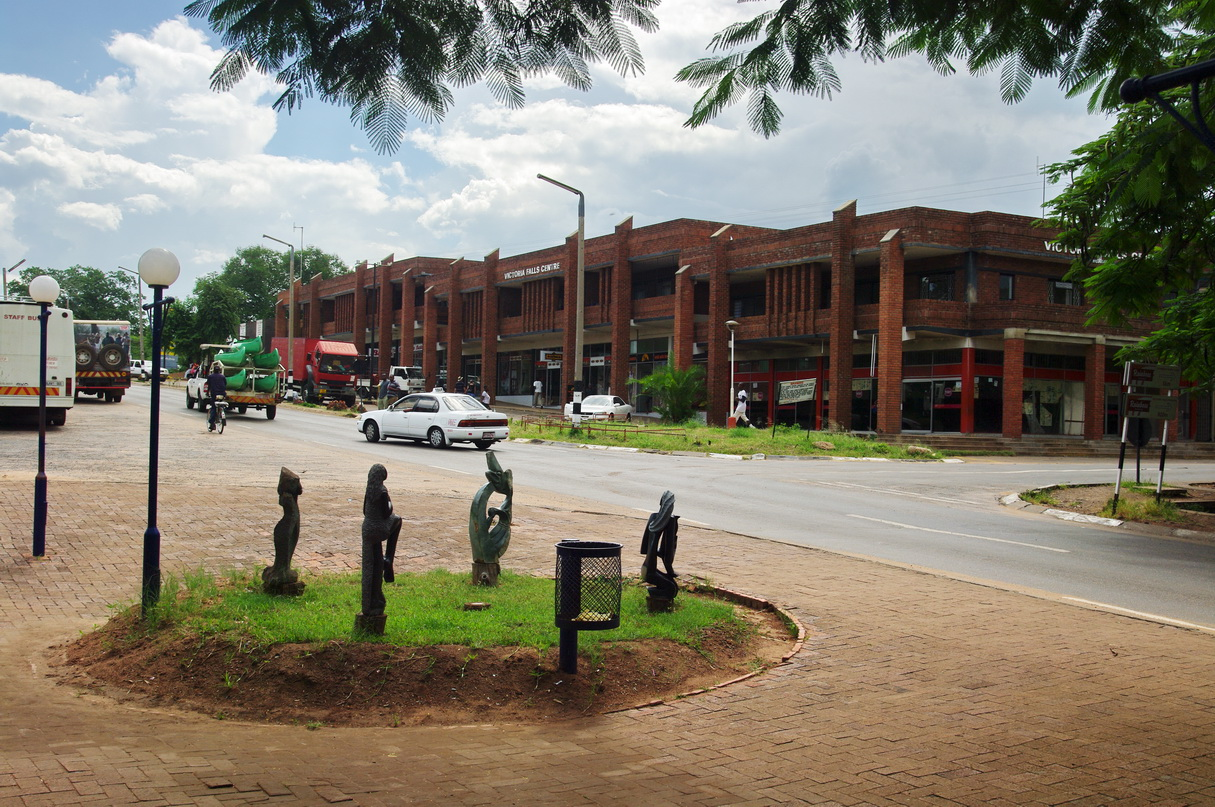
- City centre

- Coat of arms
- Nickname: Folosi
- Location within Zimbabwe
- Coordinates: 17°56′S 25°50′E
- Country: Zimbabwe
- Province: Matabeleland North
- District: Hwange

Government
  - Type: Council

Area
  - Total: 23.4 km^{2} (9.0 sq mi)

Population (2026 census)
  - Total: 35,761
  - Density: 1,528/km^{2} (3,960/sq mi)
- Time zone: UTC+2 (CAT)
- Climate: BSh

Victoria Falls, popularly known as Vic Falls, is a resort town and city in the province of Matabeleland North, Zimbabwe. It lies on the southern bank of the Zambezi River at the western end of Victoria Falls themselves. According to the 2022 Population Census, the town had a population of 35,199.

== History ==
The settlement began in 1901 when the possibility of using the waterfall for hydro-electric power was explored, and expanded when the railway from Bulawayo reached the town shortly before the Victoria Falls Bridge was opened in April 1905, connecting Southern Rhodesia (later Rhodesia; now Zimbabwe) to Northern Rhodesia (later Zambia). It became the principal tourism centre for the Falls, experiencing economic booms from the 1930s to the 1960s and in the 1980s and early 1990s. Victoria Falls gained city status on 9 December 2020.

== Geography ==
The town is located in the northwest of its province, along the border with Zambia, separated from it by the Zambezi River and the binational Victoria Falls in Southern Africa. It lies a few kilometers from Livingstone, and is surrounded by the Zambezi, Mosi-oa-Tunya and Victoria Falls national parks.

=== Climate ===
Climate data for Victoria Falls (1961–1990)
Month	Jan	Feb	Mar	Apr	May	Jun	Jul	Aug	Sep	Oct	Nov	Dec	Year
Mean daily maximum °C (°F)	29.7 (85.5)	29.4 (84.9)	29.7 (85.5)	29.2 (84.6)	27.4 (81.3)	25.0 (77.0)	24.8 (76.6)	27.8 (82.0)	31.8 (89.2)	33.4 (92.1)	32.4 (90.3)	30.2 (86.4)	29.2 (84.6)
Mean daily minimum °C (°F)	18.2 (64.8)	17.9 (64.2)	17.0 (62.6)	13.9 (57.0)	9.5 (49.1)	6.0 (42.8)	5.6 (42.1)	8.2 (46.8)	12.8 (55.0)	17.0 (62.6)	18.2 (64.8)	18.1 (64.6)	13.5 (56.4)
Average rainfall mm (inches)	167.6 (6.60)	126.3 (4.97)	69.8 (2.75)	24.2 (0.95)	2.9 (0.11)	0.6 (0.02)	0.0 (0.0)	0.3 (0.01)	1.9 (0.07)	26.6 (1.05)	63.6 (2.50)	173.5 (6.83)	657.3 (25.86)
Average rainy days (≥ 1.0 mm)	14	10	7	2	1	0	0	0	1	4	8	13	60
Source: World Meteorological Organization

== Education ==
Victoria Falls has a number of primary schools with the number having increased since 2009. These include Chamabondo Primary School, Baobab Primary School, Chinotimba Primary School, Kings Primary School, Victoria Falls Primary School, Mkhosana Primary School, St Josephine Bakita Primary School, Mkhosana Adventist Primary School, Education Centre and Jacaranda Primary School. Mosi-oa-Tunya High School is the largest school in the town, and Mkhosana Adventist Secondary School (MASS) is the second largest secondary school.

In addition there are private colleges registered under the Ministry of Primary and Secondary Education that provide secondary and high school education. These include Elite Independent College, Dadani Vocational Technical College, Lulu Academy (popularly known as College of charity), Herentals College and Oasis Christian Academy.

== Economy ==
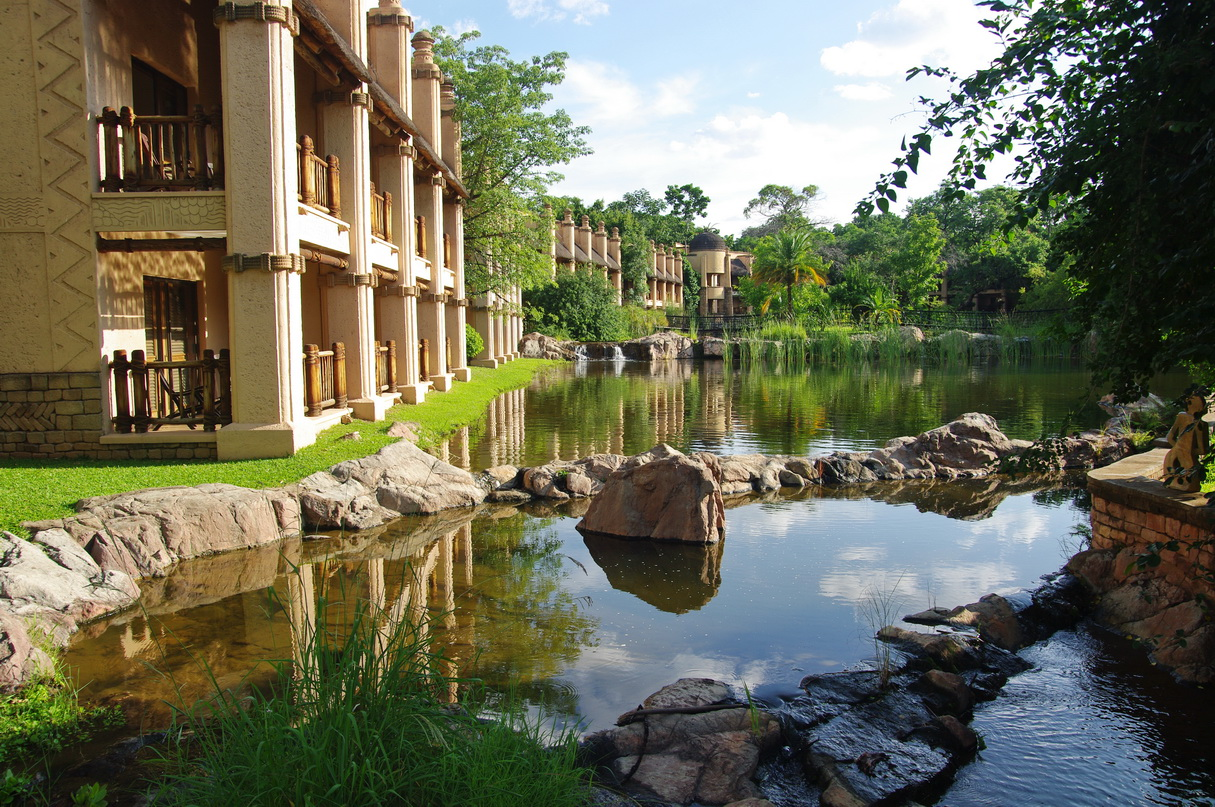
The Kingdom Hotel

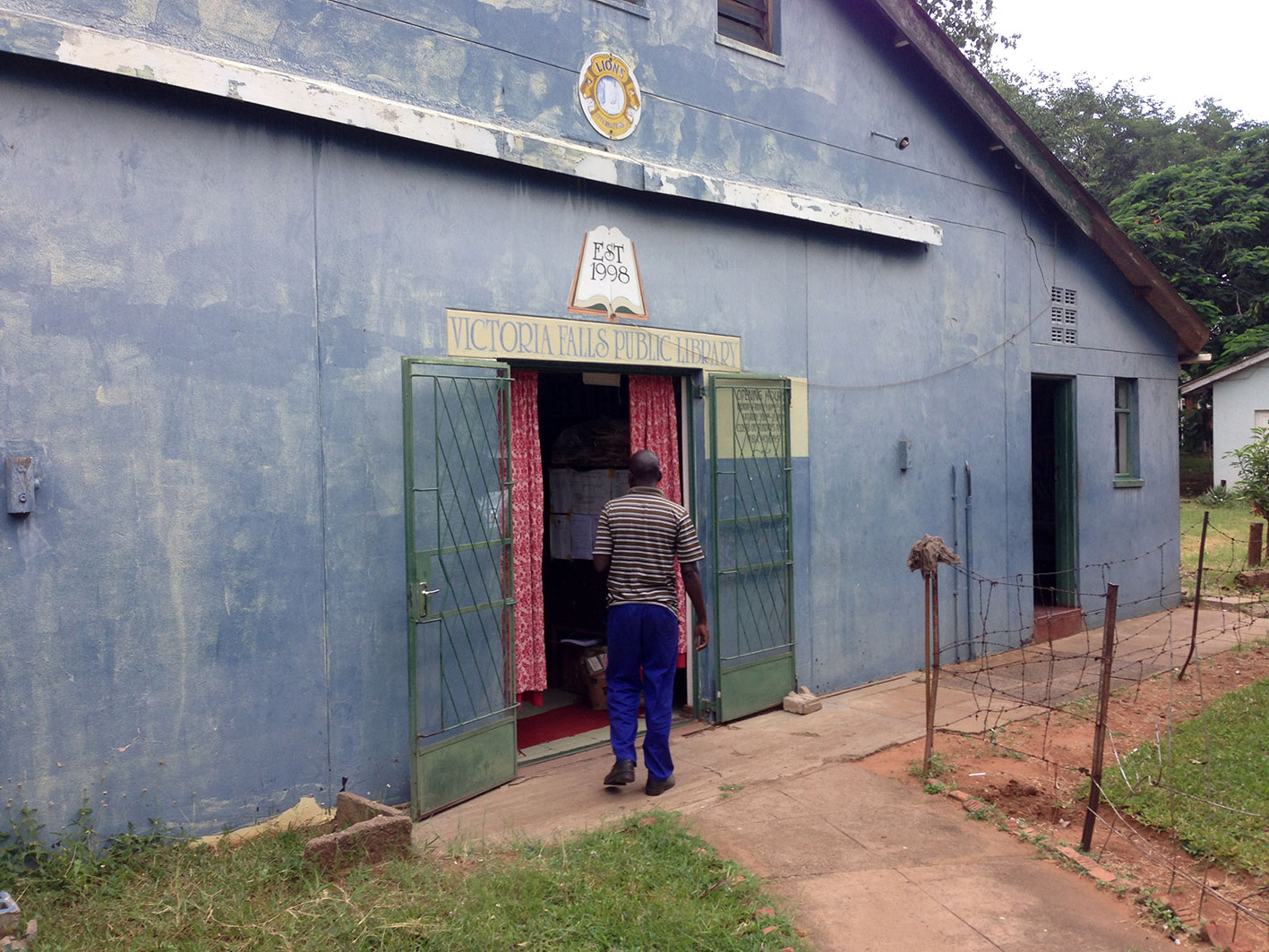
Victoria Falls Public Library

Victoria Falls' main industry is tourism, driven primarily by the waterfalls

=== Growth and affordability ===
The cost of residential housing in the Victoria Falls area is much higher than surrounding towns due to the town's reputation a tourist destination, its lack of industry and its desirability to travelers and investors. Victoria Falls is rated the second least affordable place in Zimbabwe to buy a property, behind Harare at the start of 2017.

=== Employment ===
The area's growth rate is one of the fastest in the country with the population growing 7.1% from 2018 to 2019 in a 12-month period. Most jobs in the city are travel or accommodation-related. A travel boom in recent years has seen strong employment growth, the highest of any area in Zimbabwe at 10.3% in the 2018 year, fueling the growth of the city as young people move to the area in search of employment opportunities.

=== Retail ===
Victoria Falls has a tourist-focused shopping area, centred around the Elephant Walk and Sawanga Shopping Mall. The former, a public pedestrian street opened in 1990. Victoria Falls Shopping Centre and Phumula Centre tend to offer more affordable options catering to local residents in the residential section of town.

== Health ==
The town is served by Victoria Falls District Hospital, The Chinotimba Clinic, Mkhosana Clinic, Premier Medical Aid Society, a few surgeries and The Health Bridge private hospital.

== Transport ==
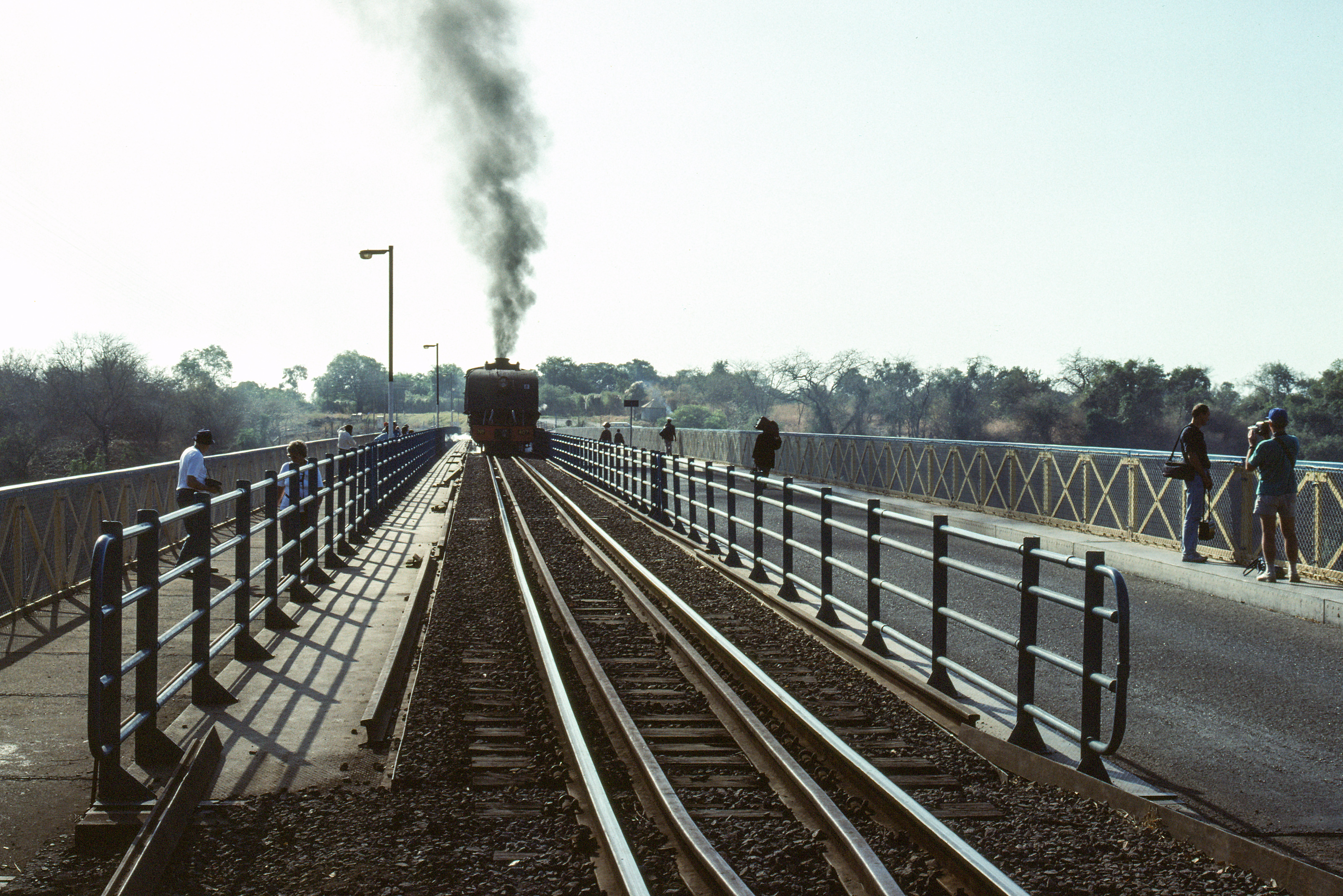
Victoria Falls combined road-rail bridge.

Victoria Falls is connected by a road (the A8 road) and railway to Hwange (109 km away) and Bulawayo (440 km away), both to the south-east. The route is part of the Cairo–Cape Town Highway (Trans-African Highway 4) and connects to the T1 highway in Zambia over the Victoria Falls Bridge over the Zambezi river. The combined road/rail bridge is the only rail link between Zambia and Zimbabwe and one of only three road links between the two countries.

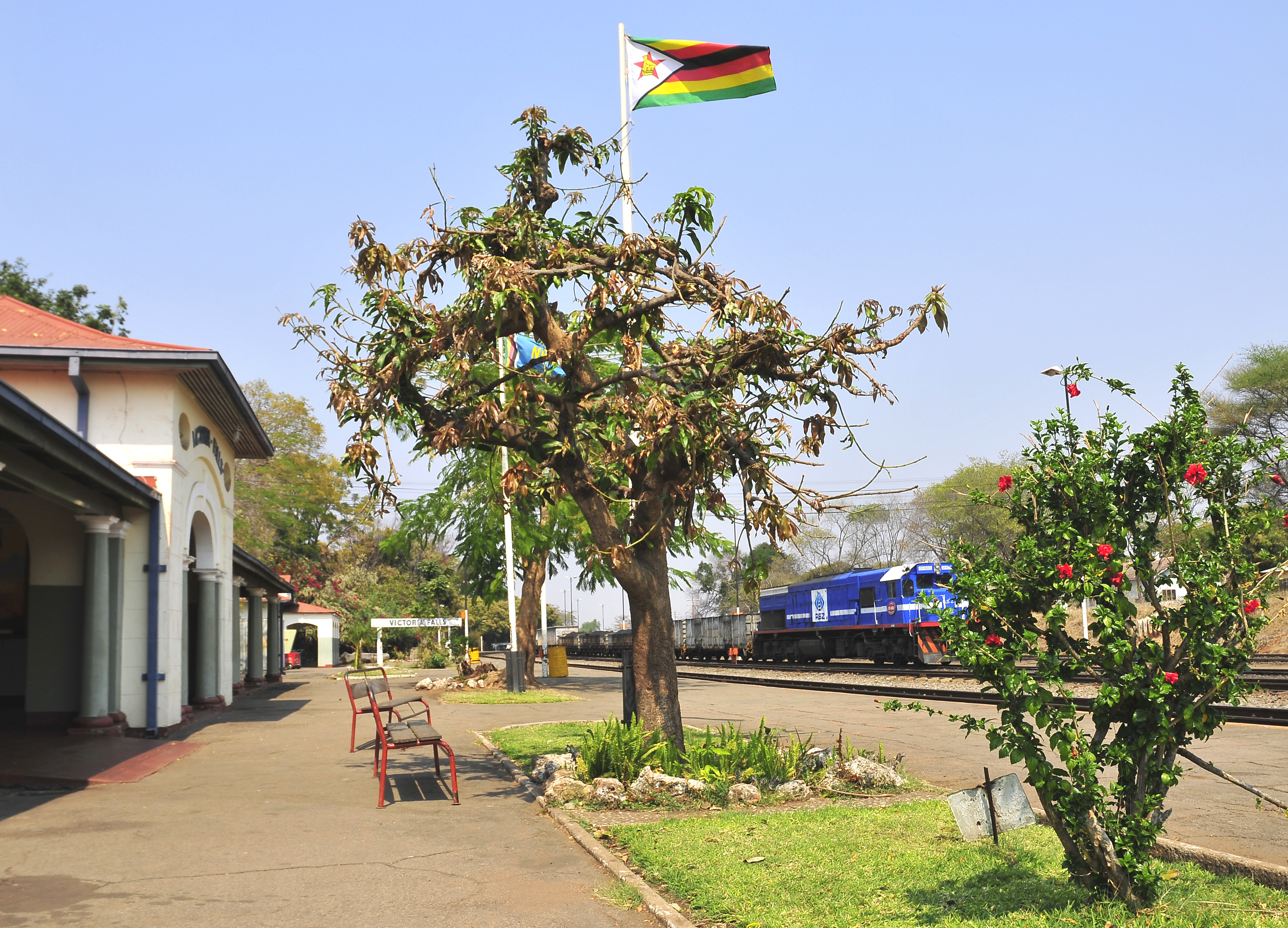
Victoria Falls railway station

Victoria Falls and its bridge form a vital link of the greater envisaged but incomplete Cape to Cairo railway. The rail route through Victoria Falls is part of a wider important route from South Africa passing through Bulawayo to into Zambia. A luxury train service, operated by Rovos Rail, connects the city with Bulawayo, Pretoria and Johannesburg two to four times a month. Until 2020, the National Railways of Zimbabwe operated a daily service to Bulawayo as well as special steam excursion trains.

Victoria Falls Airport is located 18 km south of the town and has international services to Johannesburg, Cape Town, Addis Ababa, Nairobi, Windhoek, and Gaborone and Kasane in Botswana. Domestic service connects the city with Bulawayo and Harare. Notable airlines that fly to Victoria Falls include Airlink, Discover Airlines, Ethiopian Airlines, Fastjet Zimbabwe, Kenya Airways, and South African Airways. The airport's terminal and runway facilities were rebuilt and expanded in 2013.

== Tourism ==
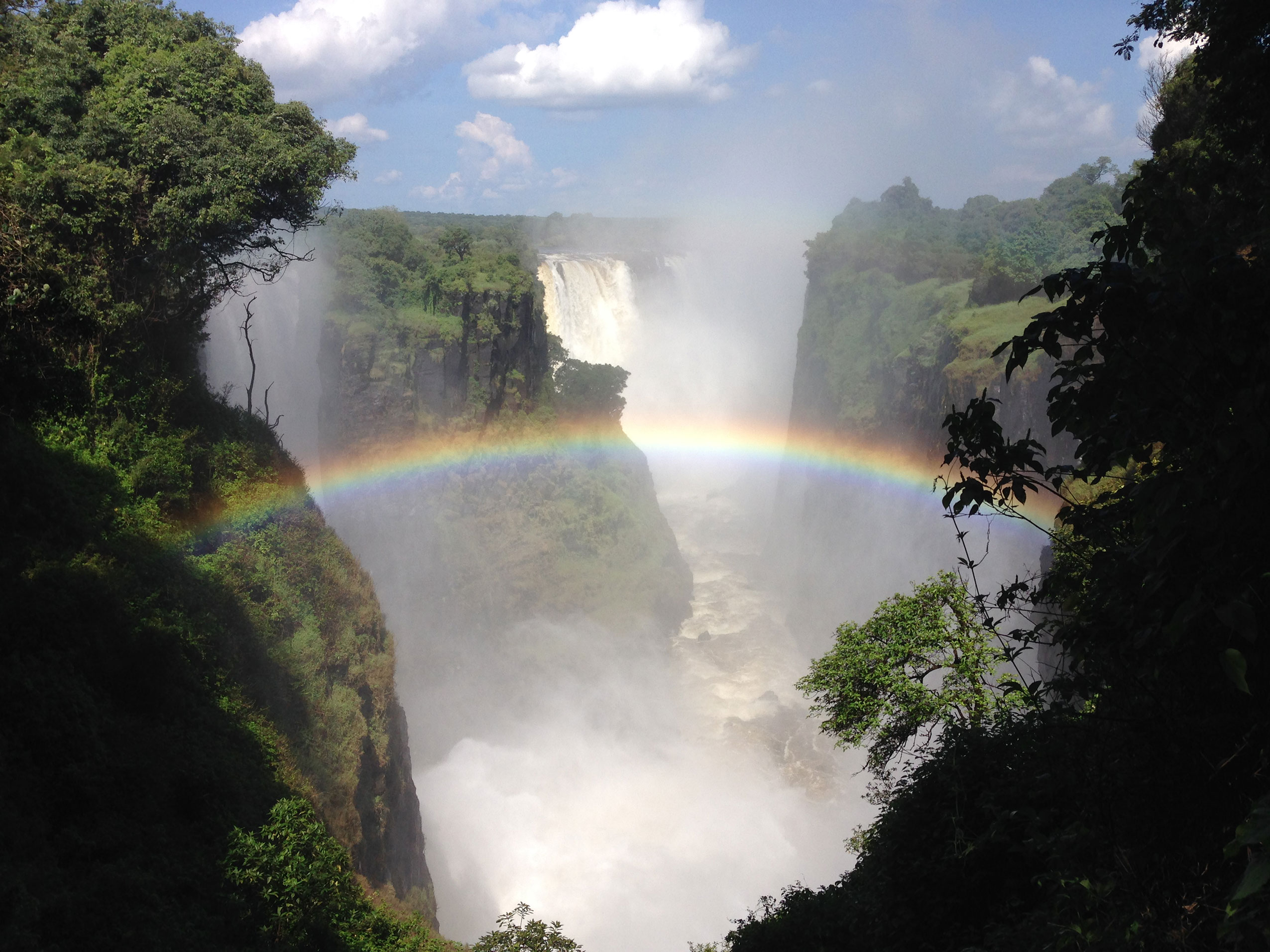
Victoria Falls looking eastwards

A resort town, Victoria Falls has become a regional centre for adventure tourism with over 200 related activities in 2019. Hiking and helicopter tours, Victoria Falls Safari Tours, jet boating, whitewater rafting, bungee jumping, mountain biking, quad biking, paragliding, sky diving and fly fishing are all popular activities in addition to viewing the Falls.

Vic Falls is a major centre for outdoor pursuits in Zimbabwe, with people from all over the country and many parts of the world travelling to view the falls and the nearby Hwange National Park. Additionally, 110-year-old coal fired rail steamer offers meals to the Victoria Falls bridge and Zambian border. Central Vic Falls, hosts the bulk of the historic district, featuring the oldest hotels, restaurants and bars.

The city is also the centre for the Sky Nature documentary: Gangs of Baboon Falls, a documentary soap opera chronicling the life and lives of the cities resident Chacma Baboons.

== Sport ==
Football is the most popular sport and there are many football teams, some of which played in the first division. There have been many teams like Zimbabwe Sun Rovers, Intundla, Makasa Sun Casino, Guyu, Burning Spear, Sprayview, Mawema and The Young Warriors.

Victoria Falls Rugby Club, which started at the farm school playing touch rugby, was strengthened and played a few touring international sides at Elephant Hills Hotel. They participated at the Victoria Falls Rugby 10s in 1999, where South African, Scottish, Zambian and Kenyan teams played.

The town is known for its grade 5 rapids where white water rafting and kayaking are done. There is also a golf course, at the Elephant Hills Hotel, which held a tournament on the South African Tour in the 1970s, the Victoria Falls Classic. There is also a proposed cricket stadium.

== Gallery ==
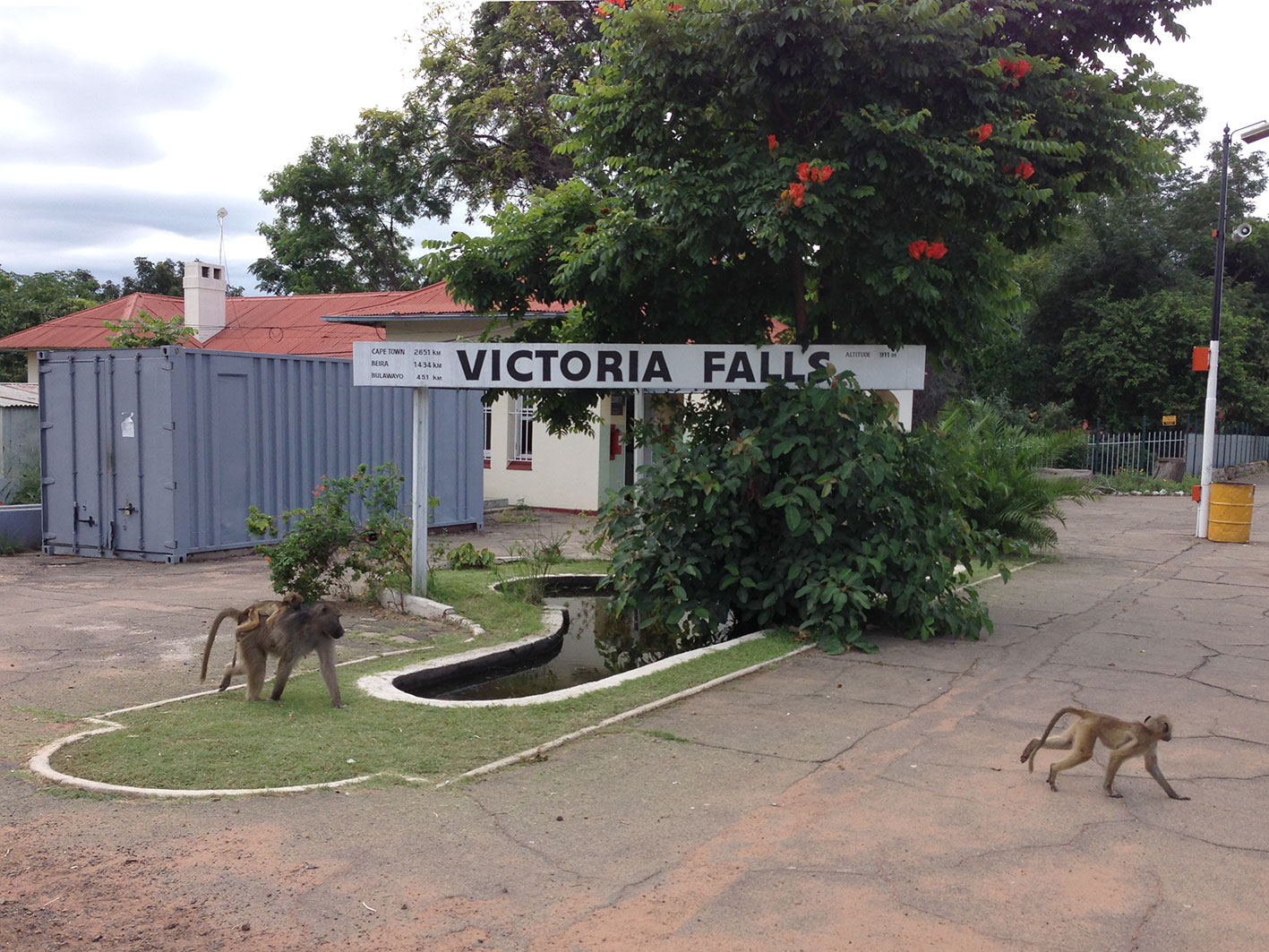
Baboons at Victoria Falls station

== Freedom of the City ==
The following people and military units have received the Freedom of the City of Victoria Falls.

=== Individuals ===
- Emmerson Mnangagwa: 9 December 2020.

== See also ==
- Livingstone, Zambia
- Breeze FM 91.2
- Victoria Falls Hotel
- Victoria Falls Field Museum (Zambia)
- Victoria Falls Power Station (Zambia)
