= List of power stations in Zimbabwe =

The following page lists all power stations in Zimbabwe.

== Coal ==
Plant	Coordinates	Capacity (MW)	Year completed	Year Decommissioned	Ref
Hwange	18°22′59″S 26°28′13″E	1520	1987		
Munyati	18°39′18″S 29°46′54″E	100	1957	2023	
Bulawayo	20°09′31″S 28°34′31″E	90	1957	2023	
Harare	17°50′42″S 31°01′54″E	90	1955	2023	

== Hydroelectric ==
Hydroelectric station	Community	Coordinates	Type	Capacity (MW)	Year completed	Name of reservoir	River	Refs
Kariba South Bank	Kariba	16°31′26″S 28°45′51″E	Reservoir	666	1977	Lake Kariba	Zambezi River	
Kariba South Bank Extension	Kariba	16°31′23″S 28°45′56″E	Reservoir	300	2018	Lake Kariba	Zambezi River	
Tokwe Mukorsi Dam	Masvingo	20°43′31″S 30°53′59″E	Reservoir	15	2016	Lake Tugwi-Mukosi	Tokwe River	

=== Proposed hydro power stations ===
Batoka Gorge Hydroelectric Power Station

== Solar ==
Solar power station	Community	Coordinates	Fuel type	Capacity (megawatts)	Year completed	Name of owner	Notes
Chiredzi Solar Power Station	Masvingo Province	21°03′15″S 31°22′57″E		90		Triangle Solar System (TSS)	
Colleen Bawn Solar Power Station	Matabeleland South Province	21°01′05″S 29°11′59″E		32		Pretoria Portland Cement Limited	16 MW of the 32 MW capacity reserved for internal use by PPC Limited. Balance to be sold to ZETDCL.
Kwekwe Solar Power Station	Midlands Province	18°47′27″S 29°48′10″E		50		Kwekwe Energy Company	
Norton Solar Power Station	Mashonaland West Province	17°59′59″S 30°36′56″E		100		Norton Solar Company	The energy produced would be sold to ZETDC, under a 25-year power purchase plan.
Umguza Solar Power Station	Matabeleland North Province	20°00′24″S 28°11′38″E		200	2022 Expected	AF Power Private Limited	
Victoria Falls Solar Power Station	Matabeleland North Province	17°55′39″S 25°50′54″E		100	2022 Expected	Kibo Energy Plc	

== See also ==
- Energy in Zimbabwe
- List of power stations in Africa
- List of largest power stations in the world
- Zimbabwe Electricity Supply Authority
