= Hwange District =

Administrative district in northwestern Zimbabwe

Coordinates: 18°45′S 26°30′E

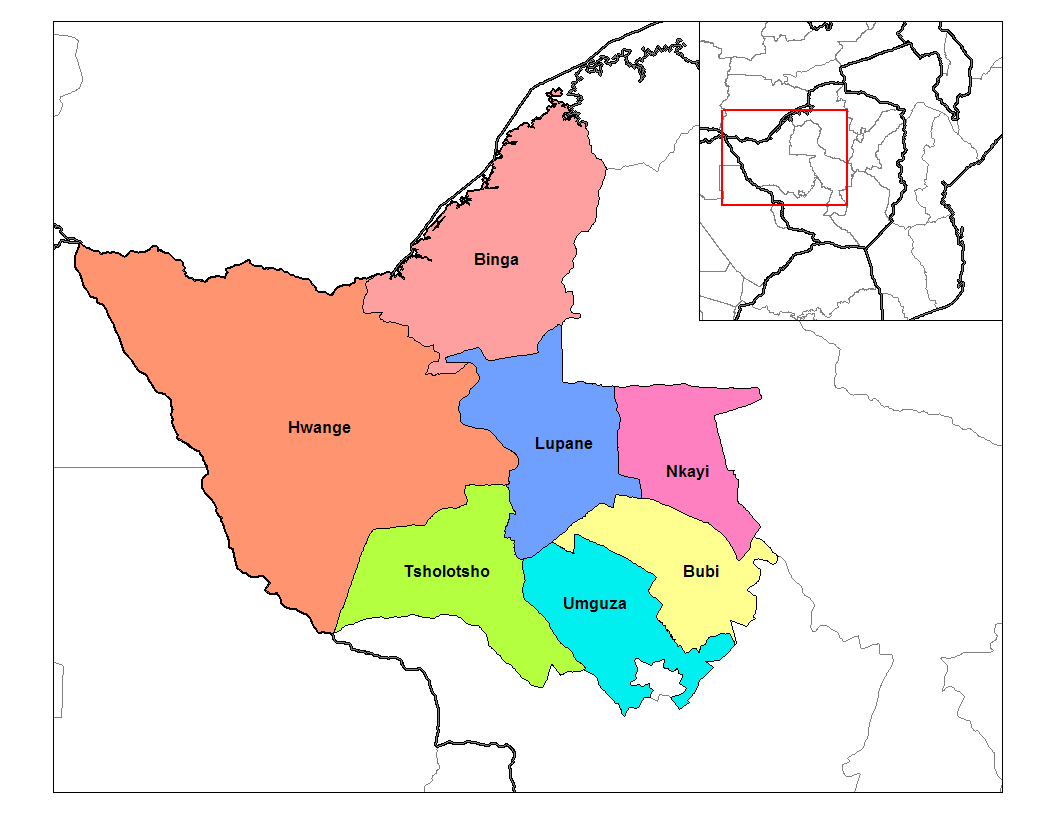
A map of the Matabeleland North districts

Hwange District is an administrative district in northwestern Zimbabwe, in southern Africa.

== Location ==
The district is located in Matabeleland North Province, in northwest Zimbabwe, bordering Botswana and the Republic of Zambia. Its main town, Hwange, is located about 100 kilometres (62 mi), by road, southeast of Victoria Falls, the nearest large city.

== Overview ==
Hwange District is primarily a mining district. Large coal deposits are found in the district and several large coal mines are located there, including Hwange Colliery, the largest coal mine in Zimbabwe. The district headquarters is located in Hwange, a city which lies of the Bulawayo-Victoria Falls Road (A8 Highway), with an estimated population of 33,210 as of 2004.

== Population ==
The current population of Hwange District is 62,670.

== See also ==
- Districts of Zimbabwe
- Provinces of Zimbabwe
