= Seke District =

Coordinates: 18°14′S 30°57′E

- Second-level administrative subdivision
- Interactive map of Seke District
- Country: Zimbabwe
- Province: Mashonaland East

Area
  - Total: 2,637 km^{2} (1,018 sq mi)

Population (2022 census)
  - Total: 200,478
  - Density: 76.03/km^{2} (196.9/sq mi)
- Time zone: UTC+1 (CET)
  - Summer (DST): UTC+1 (CEST)

Seke District is a district of the Province Mashonaland East in Zimbabwe.
