= Zimbabwe Electricity Supply Authority =

Zimbabwean utility company

ZESA
- Company type: Public utility
- Industry: Energy industry
- Headquarters: Harare, Zimbabwe
- Services: Electricity
- Website: Homepage

Zimbabwe Electricity Supply Authority, (ZESA) whose official name is ZESA Holdings (Private) Limited, is a state-owned company whose task is to generate, transmit, and distribute electricity in Zimbabwe.

It has organized this task by delegation to its subsidiaries, the energy generating company Zimbabwe Power Company (ZPC) and the Zimbabwe Electricity Transmission and Distribution Company (ZETDC). Other subsidiaries are the investment branch ZESA Enterprises (ZENT) and internet provider PowerTel Communications (Private) Limited. ZESA is the only electricity generator and supplier for the public grid. For many years the company has failed to produce enough energy to meet demands. ZESA produced an estimated 6.8 billion kWh in 2016, while demand was estimated at 7.118 billion kWh. ZESA represents Zimbabwe in the Southern African Power Pool.

== Current situation ==
In general the power generation capacity in Zimbabwe is too small to meet demand from the industry and private householdings. Import of electricity from surrounding countries has eased the situation somewhat, but load shedding is used on a routine basis and some rural areas do not have electricity over long periods. Zimbabwe's difficult economic situation causes part of the problems, as coal for power stations may at times not be produced in sufficient amounts. On the other hand, the economy is hampered by the unforeseeable energy situation. Recently the revival of the economy has increased demand.

=== Situation for the power stations ===
ZESA owns the Kariba Power Station together with its Zambian counterpart, ZESCO. The station is part of the Kariba Dam project, damming the Zambezi river. The Zimbabwean-owned capacity is said to be around 750 megawatts. ZESA also owns four thermal power stations, of which Hwange Thermal Power Station in the extreme west of the country is by far the largest with a theoretical capacity of about 920 megawatts. The other three at Harare, Bulawayo and Munyati have a nominal capacity of 270 megawatts combined. In the 2010s, the thermal power stations have only been producing small amounts or no electricity due to coal shortages and maintenance neglect. Botswana Power Corporation (BPC) and Namibia's NamPower have in 2009 made agreements to help ZESA to revive the capacity in exchange for power deliveries. Work on Hwange has led to a better situation and the three minor stations were scheduled to be revived in the first quarter of 2011. In December 2015 China agreed to provide a $1.2 billion loan to add 600 megawatts of generating capacity to the Hwange Thermal Power Station. ZESA officially files a lawsuit against Learned Hand Initiatives...for threatening its monopoly powers its says its quotes and books are now the major power stations ahead of Kariba and Hwange which is a big threat to the state owned enterprise...

== ZESA power stations ==
- Kariba South Hydroelectric Power Station
- Hwange Thermal Power Station (coal-fired): 18°23′0.16″S 26°28′12.03″E
- Harare Thermal Power Station (coal-fired): 17°50′44.5″S 31°1′55.5″E
- Bulawayo Thermal Power Station (coal-fired): 20°9′31″S 28°34′32″E
- Munyati Thermal Power Station (coal-fired): Established 1938, 18°39′20″S 29°46′55″E

=== Projected stations ===
Besides plans to upgrade both the Hwange plant and the Kariba dam facility, two new plants are projected, however funding is not secured.

- Gokwe North Thermal Power Station, near the Sengwa coal fields
- Batoka Gorge Hydroelectric Power Station, situated between Victoria Falls and Lake Kariba, a joint venture with Zambia.

== See also ==
- NamPower, Namibian equivalent
- Eskom, South African equivalent
