= List of renamed places in Zimbabwe =

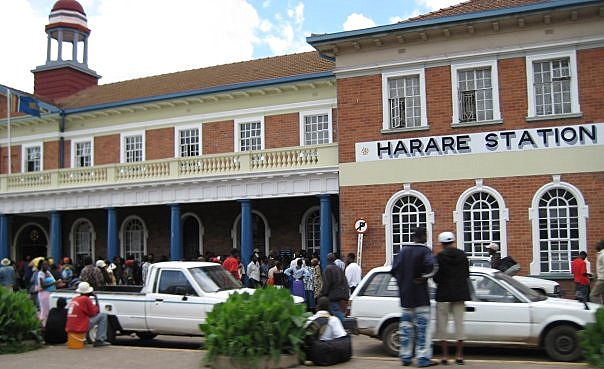
Harare railway station, in Zimbabwe's capital city. Harare was called Salisbury until 1982.

Place names in Zimbabwe, including the name of the country itself, have been altered at various points in history. The name Zimbabwe was officially adopted concurrently with Britain's grant of independence in April 1980. Prior to that point, the country had been called Southern Rhodesia from 1898 to 1964 (or 1980, according to British law), Rhodesia from 1964 to 1979, and Zimbabwe Rhodesia between June and December 1979. Since Zimbabwean independence in 1980, the names of cities, towns, streets and other places have been changed by the government, most prominently in a burst of renaming in 1982.

The Zimbabwean government began renaming cities, towns, streets and other places in 1982, hoping to remove vestiges of British and Rhodesian rule. The capital city, Salisbury, was renamed Harare. Many other place names merely had their spellings altered to reflect the orthography of Shona or Kalanga, as under white rule the spellings officially adopted were derived from Sindebele orthography. Most major cities and towns were renamed, but some places with an Ndebele majority—such as Bulawayo, the country's second city—were not. Some smaller towns retain their colonial-era names, such as Beitbridge, West Nicholson and Fort Rixon. Street names were changed wholesale, with British-style names, particularly those of colonial figures, being phased out in favour of those of black nationalist leaders, prominently Robert Mugabe, Joshua Nkomo and Jason Moyo.

== Name of the country ==
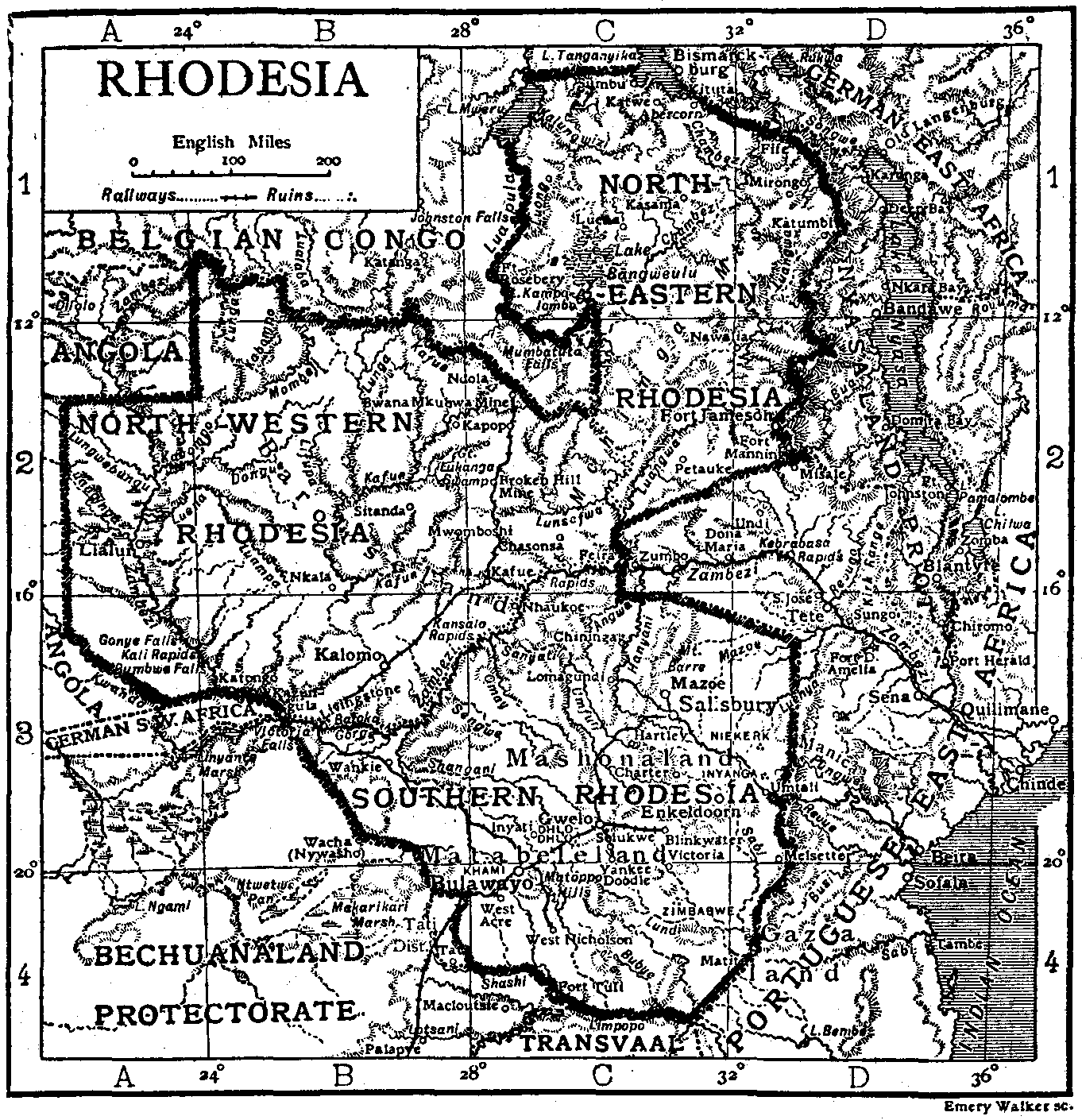
A 1911 map of Rhodesia, with present-day Zimbabwe labelled as Southern Rhodesia

The name of the country has changed several times since it was originally demarcated in the late-nineteenth century by Cecil Rhodes' British South Africa Company. The company initially referred to each territory it acquired by its respective name—Mashonaland, Matabeleland and so on—and collectively called its lands "Zambesia" (Rhodes' personal preference) or "Charterland" (Leander Starr Jameson's), but neither of these caught on. Most of the first settlers instead called their new home Rhodesia, after Rhodes; this was common enough usage by 1891 to be used by journalists. In 1892, the Rhodesia Chronicle and Rhodesia Herald newspapers were first published, respectively at Tuli and Salisbury. The company officially applied the name Rhodesia in 1895. "It is not clear why the name should have been pronounced with the emphasis on the second rather than the first syllable," Robert Blake comments, "but this appears to have been the custom from the beginning and it never changed."

Matabeleland and Mashonaland, both of which lay south of the Zambezi, were first officially referred to collectively by Britain as Southern Rhodesia in 1898. Southern Rhodesia attained responsible government as a self-governing colony in 1923, while Northern Rhodesia (to the Zambezi's north) became a directly administered British colony the following year.

The name "Zimbabwe", based on a Shona term for Great Zimbabwe, an ancient ruined city in the country's south-east, was first recorded as a term of national reference in 1960, when it was coined by the black nationalist Michael Mawema, whose Zimbabwe National Party became the first to officially use the name in 1961. The term Rhodesia, derived from Rhodes' surname, was perceived as inappropriate because of its colonial origin and connotations. According to Mawema, black nationalists held a meeting in 1960 to choose an alternative name for the country, and the names Machobana and Monomotapa were proposed before his suggestion, Zimbabwe, prevailed. A further alternative, put forward by nationalists in Matabeleland, had been "Matopos", referring to the Matopos Hills to the south of Bulawayo.

It was initially not clear how the chosen term was to be used—a letter written by Mawema in 1961 refers to "Zimbabweland"—but "Zimbabwe" was sufficiently established by 1962 to become the generally preferred term of the black nationalist movement. In a 2001 interview, black nationalist Edson Zvobgo recalled that the name was mentioned by Mawema during a political rally, "and it caught hold, and that was that". The name was subsequently used by the black nationalist factions during the Second Chimurenga campaigns against the Rhodesian government during the Rhodesian Bush War. The most major of these were the Zimbabwe African National Union (led by Robert Mugabe from 1975), and the Zimbabwe African People's Union, led by Joshua Nkomo from its founding in the early-1960s.

When Northern Rhodesia achieved independence as Zambia in 1964, the Southern Rhodesian government introduced a bill to allow the country to be known simply as Rhodesia, which passed its third reading on 9 December 1964. Although no assent was given to the bill, the revised name was widely adopted, and following the Unilateral Declaration of Independence in 1965, it was the name of the unrecognised government. This name was used until June 1979, when new institutions of government came into power following the Internal Settlement of the previous year, and the country adopted the name Zimbabwe Rhodesia. Following the terms of the Lancaster House Agreement of December 1979 that the United Kingdom should preside over fresh elections before granting independence, direct British control started that month with reversion to the former name of Southern Rhodesia. The UK granted independence under the name Zimbabwe on 18 April 1980.

== Geographical renaming since 1980 ==
Starting in 1982, on the second anniversary of the country's independence as Zimbabwe, the government began renaming cities, towns and streets in an attempt to eradicate symbols of British colonialism and white minority rule. The capital Salisbury, which had been named after the British Prime Minister, the 3rd Marquess of Salisbury, was renamed Harare, after the Shona chief Neharawa. Other place names were simply new transliterations, to reflect the orthography of the local language—many places had been gazetted with Sindebele orthography during the colonial period. This generally included the letter "l", which is not used in Shona, being used instead of "r".

Pre-1982 name	New name
Balla Balla	Mbalabala
Belingwe	Mberengwa
Chipinga	Chipinge
Enkeldoorn	Chivhu
Essexvale	Esigodini
Fort Victoria	Masvingo
Gwelo	Gweru
Gatooma	Kadoma
Hartley	Chegutu
Inyanga	Nyanga
Jombe	Zhombe
Marandellas	Marondera
Matopos	Matobo
Melsetter	Chimanimani
Que Que	Kwekwe
Salisbury	Harare
Selukwe	Shurugwi
Shabani	Zvishavane
Sinoia	Chinhoyi
Umtali	Mutare
Wankie	Hwange

While most larger cities and towns were renamed, the spelling of Zimbabwe's second-largest city, Bulawayo, remains unchanged because its Sindebele orthography reflects the dominant ethnicity. Towns which have retained names of European origin include mostly smaller communities such as Beitbridge, Colleen Bawn, West Nicholson, Fort Rixon, Craigmore, Cashel, Juliasdale, Glendale, and Birchenough Bridge. The colonial-era names of suburbs of Harare, such as Borrowdale, Highlands, Rietfontein, Tynwald, and Mount Pleasant also remained unchanged. An exception was Harari, which was renamed Mbare.

Street names were also changed, with names of British colonists such as Cecil Rhodes being replaced with those of Zimbabwean nationalist leaders, such as Jason Moyo, Josiah Tongogara, Simon Muzenda, and Leopold Takawira. Robert Mugabe's name eventually became attached to the main street or town centre of every sizeable town as a result of a spate of changes in 1990. Other streets have been named after leaders of neighbouring countries, such as Samora Machel of Mozambique, Julius Nyerere of Tanzania, Kenneth Kaunda of Zambia and Nelson Mandela of South Africa. Others have a general pan-African nationalist theme, such as Africa Unity Square in Harare, formerly Cecil Square.
