= Matabeleland South Volleyball Association =

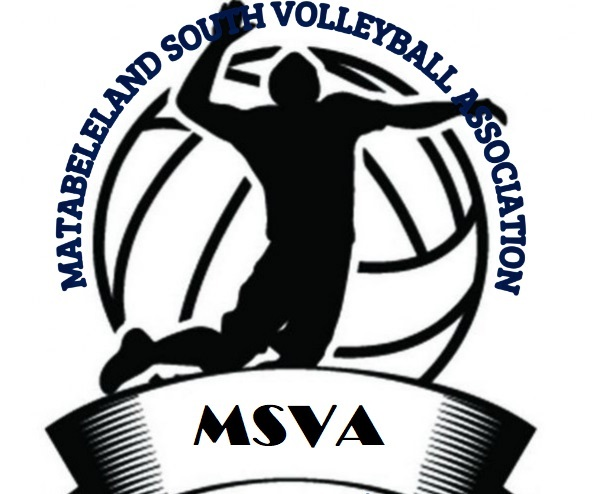
- Sport: Volleyball
- Jurisdiction: Matabeleland South
- Abbreviation: MSVA
- Founded: 2009
- Affiliation: Zimbabwe Volleyball Association
- Affiliation date: 2009
- Headquarters: Gwanda
- President: Muziwandile Gumbo
- Secretary: Bothwell Nyoni
- Sponsor: Self sponsored
- Replaced: Matabeleland Volleyball Association

Matabeleland South Volleyball Association (MSVA) is the governing body of volleyball, beach volleyball and other forms of volleyball in Matabeleland South, a province of Zimbabwe. It represents the interests of provincial clubs and other volleyball stakeholders.

The MSVA was founded in 2009. It is affiliated to the Sport and Recreation Council of Zimbabwe through the Zimbabwe Volleyball Association. It was formed when the then Matabeleland Volleyball Association was divided into three provincial volleyball associations, Bulawayo Volleyball Association, Matabeleland North Volleyball Association and Matabeleland South Volleyball Association. The association's motto "ke motshameko wa rona" is in SeTswana/SeBirwa language, and means "it's our game". Variants of the motto are sometimes used with different languages found in the province, Sotho/Pedi "moraluko wa rona", Venda "ndi zwa hashu", Tsonga/Shangani "nthlangu wa hina", Khalanga "nzano yedu". matsouthvolleyball.org

== Executive Members ==
The MSVA executive members are elected into office after every four years in an elective congress whereby affiliated members vote for members of their choice.

=== President: Mr. J. Mpofu ===
1. 1st Vice-president: Mr. F. Ndlovu
2. 2nd Vice-president: Mr. A. Moyo
3. Secretary General: Ms. S. Khumalo
4. Treasurer General: Mr. M. Gumbo
5. Committee Member: Ms. A. Mugabe

=== 2013-2016 ===
==== President: Mr. J. Mpofu ====
1. 1st Vice-president: Mr. I. Masimba
2. 2nd Vice-president: Mr. B. Nyoni
3. Secretary General: Ms. M. Mathema
4. Treasurer General: Mr. M. Gumbo
5. Committee Member: None
6. Committee Member: None
  Matabeleland South province

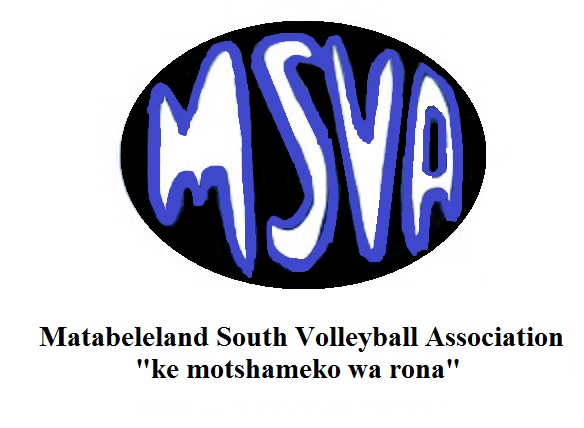
MSVA Logo 2014-2023

=== 2017-2020 ===
==== President: Ms. M. Mathema ====
1. 1st Vice-president: Mr. M. Horeka
2. 2nd Vice-president: Mr. P. Mdlongwa
3. Secretary General: Ms. L. Mthombeni
4. Treasurer General: Mr. M. Gumbo
5. Committee Member: Mr. B. Nyoni
6. Committee Member: Mr. A. Mudau

=== 2021-2024 ===
==== President: Mr. M. Gumbo (acting for Ms. M. Mathema) ====
1. 1st Vice-president: Mr. I. Masimba (acting for Mr. M. Horeka)
2. 2nd Vice-president: Mr. L. Peula (acting for Mr. P. Mdlongwa)
3. Secretary General: Mr. B. Nyoni
4. Treasurer General: Dr. T. Mathe
5. Committee Member: Ms. A. Mugabe (acting for T. Msindazi)
6. Committee Member: Mr. M. Masuku (acting for J. Mpofu)

== Activity ==
The MSVA has been active since its formation by organising club volleyball tournaments. Of note is the MSVA League that was created in November 2013 and resumed in 2014. In its tenth season running, the league has featured so far, teams as follows but not all in one season; Izihlobo, JM Nkomo Polytechnic, ZRP Gwanda, ZPCS Gwanda, Gwanda High, Gwanda Gvt, Gwanda Stalioans and Wolves, all from Gwanda town, Jessie Mine and JZ Moyo High School from West Nicholson, Filabusi Pirates, Filabusi Wildones and GSU Cavaliers of Gwanda State University from Filabusi, Plumtree and VJM Spartans from Plumtree, Mzingwane Vipers of Mzingwane High School in Esigodini, Matopo Dolphins from Matopo High School, Beitbridge Eagles from Beitbridge and Colleen Bawn from Colleen Bawn.

== Tournaments ==
- Season Opening "Yasuka yahlala"
- MSVA League
- Independence trophy
- Southern Region Invitational tournament
- End of season tournament

== Inaugural MSVA League ==
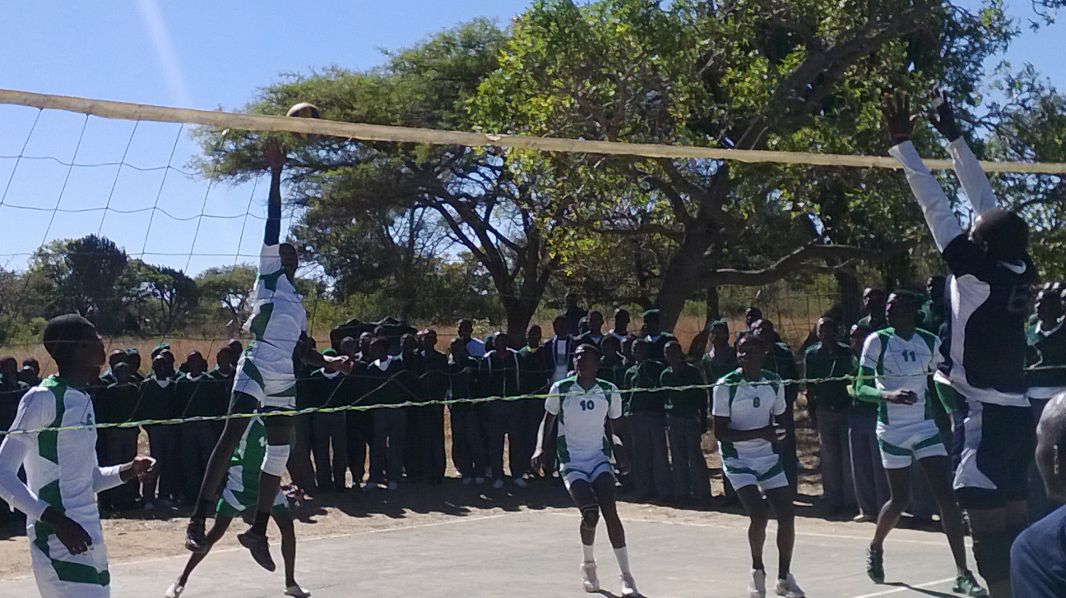
Matopo Dolphins vs Izihlobo, 2014

The inaugural MSVA league (2014 season) was contested by five male teams with the final league standings as follows;

Men	P	W	L	Pts
1. Izihlobo	8	8	0	22
2. ZRP Gwanda	8	6	2	18
3. Jessie Mine	8	2	6	7
4. Matopo Dolphins	8	1	7	4
5. Mzingwane Vipers	8	1	7	3

== 2015 season ==
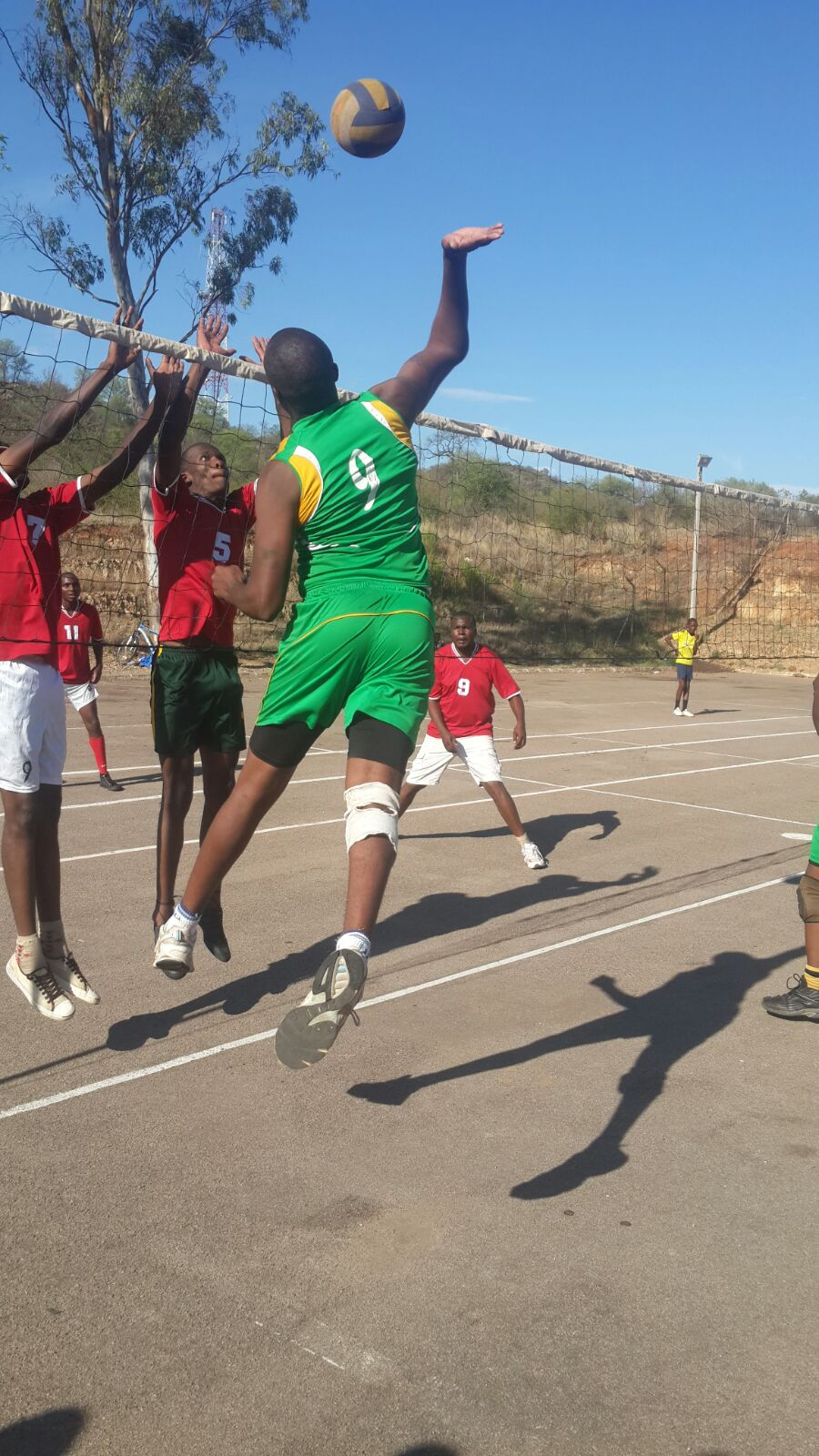
JM Nkomo Polytechnic vs ZPCS Gwanda, 2015

In 2015 the MSVA managed to organize a women's league. A provincial team was organized to participate in the Zimbabwe Volleyball Association Inter Provincial championships, the women team came out second after losing to Harare province in the final.

Men	P	W	L	Pts
1. JM Nkomo Polytechnic	14	14	0	41
2. ZRP Gwanda	14	12	2	37
3. Colleen Bawn	14	8	6	24
4. Filabusi Wildones	14	7	7	21
5. Jessie Mine	14	6	8	19
6. ZPCS Gwanda	14	5	9	14
7. Gwanda High	14	4	10	10
8. JZ Moyo High School	14	0	14	2

Women	P	W	L	Pts
1. ZRP Gwanda	6	5	1	14
2. JM Nkomo Polytechnic	6	4	2	11
3. JZ Moyo High School	6	2	4	8
4. Stallions	6	1	5	3

== 2016 season ==
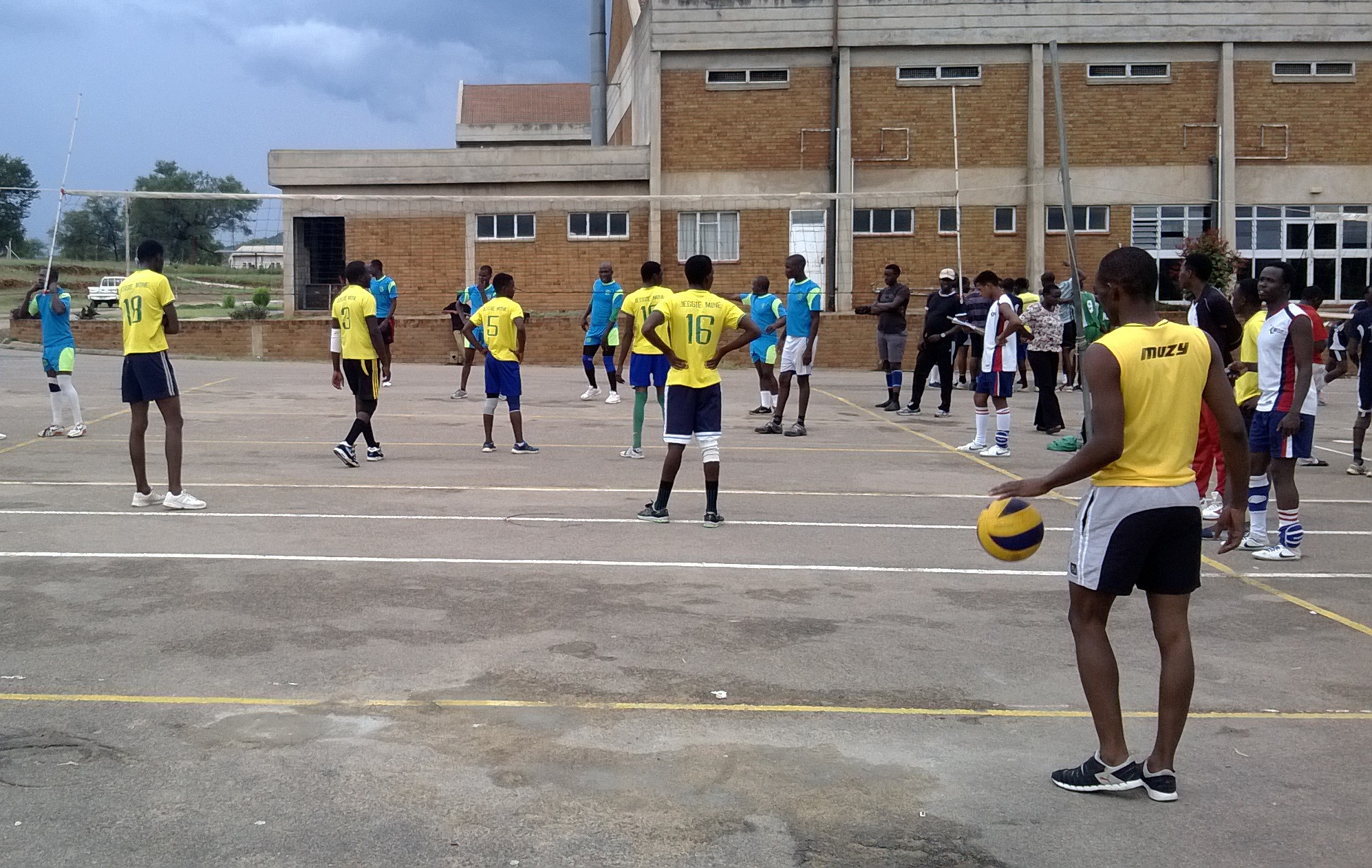
Jessie Mine vs ZRP Gwanda, 2015

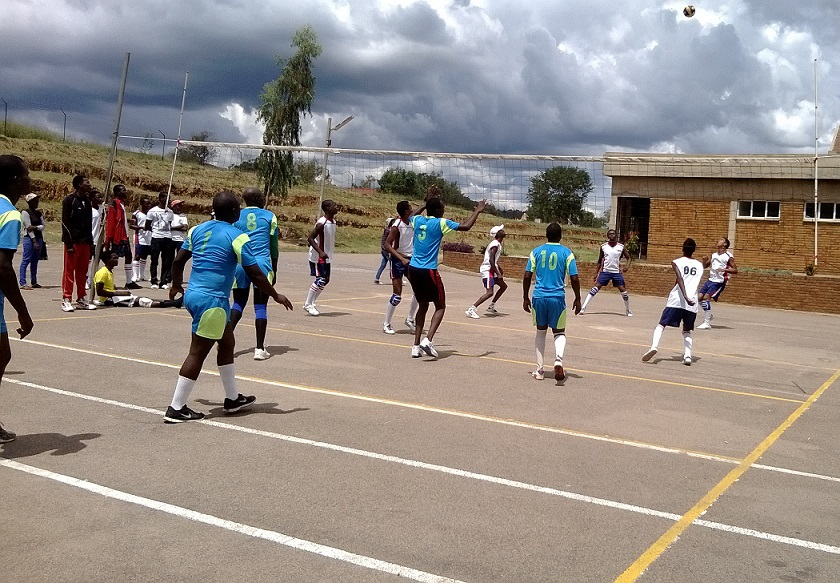
ZRP Gwanda vs Filabusi Wildones, 2015

The 2016 season kick-started in March 2016. There were initially nine men and two women teams participating. Due to lack of travel funds by teams, the league was reduced to four men's teams and no women league. The league was re-branded "The MSVA Super 4", composed of Izihlobo, ZRP Gwanda, Jessie Mine and Gwanda Government. However, the league was cancelled with only one match played, Izihlobo beating ZRP Gwanda, 3–1.

== 2022 season and onwards ==
The 2022 MSVA Volleyball League season kickstarted in October after a 2 year layoff due to COVID restrictions. It was participated by 12 men teams and 3 women teams. Beitbridge Eagles were the eventual men's champions, with Wolves and Jessie Mine taking 2nd and 3rd places, respectively. Gwanda High were the women champions, with GSU Cavaliers and Jessie Mine taking 2nd and 3rd places, respectively. The MSVA League has since been participated every year that followed. Beitbridge Eagles won it in the years 2023 and 2024. The defending (2025) men's champions are Gwanda Spikers.
