= Insiza River =

Coordinates: 20.727619°S 29.342666°E

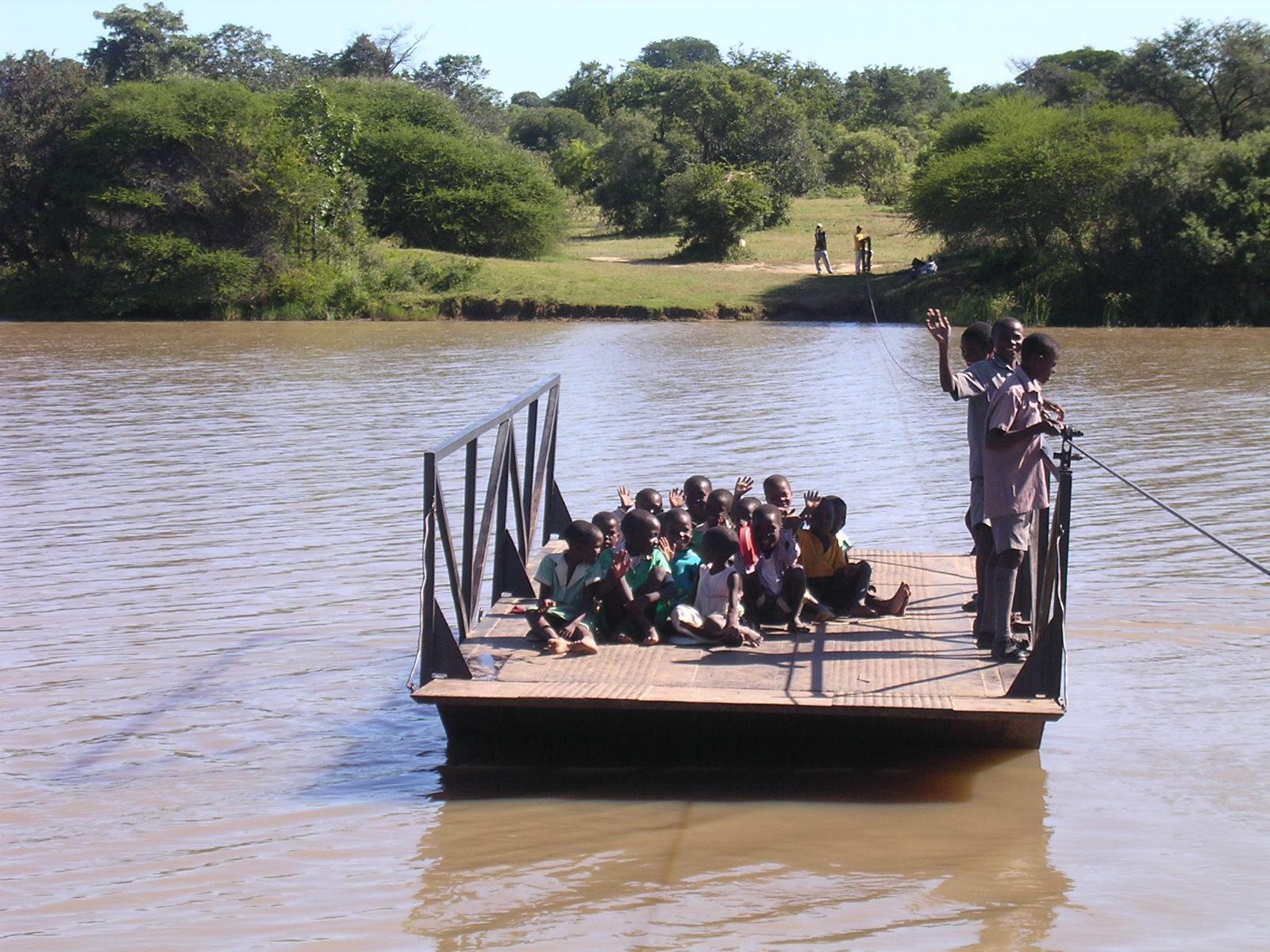
- Ekusileni pontoon ferry, on the Insiza River downstream of Filabusi, Zimbabwe

Location
- Country: Zimbabwe

Physical characteristics
- Source
  - location: Fort Rixon, Zimbabwe
- Mouth
  - location: Mzingwane River
- Basin size: 3,401 km^{2} (1,313 sq mi)
- Discharge
  - average: 25.9 mm/a (1.02 in/year) unit runoff

The Insiza River is the principal tributary of the Mzingwane River in Zimbabwe.

It rises near Fort Rixon, Insiza District, and flows into the Mzingwane River near West Nicholson.

== Hydrology ==
The upper reaches of the Insiza are ephemeral, but below Silalabuhwa Dam, the river flows for two-thirds of the year.

Major tributaries of the Insiza River include the Inkankezi and Siwaze rivers.

== Cities, towns and settlements along the river ==
The settlements below are ordered from the beginning of the river to its end:

- Fort Rixon village
- Filabusi village

== Bridges and crossings ==
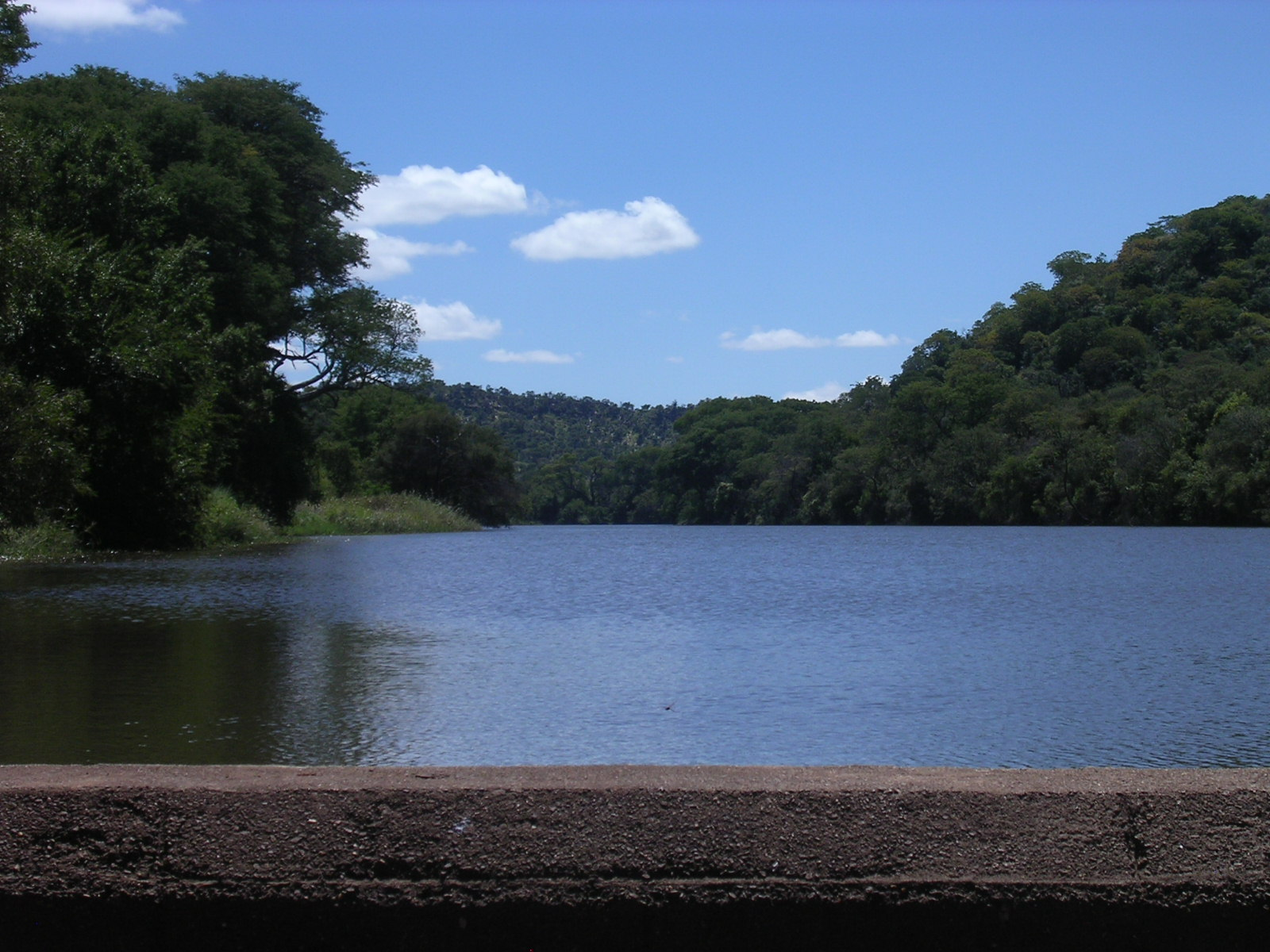
Croft Bridge on the Insiza River near Filabusi.

There are four main bridges over the Insiza River:

- Bridge on main Mbalabala - Masvingo road, near Filabusi.
- Bridge on Filabusi - Mataga road.
- Bridge on Filabusi - West Nicholson road.
- Croft Bridge, on the road from Filabusi to Croft mine.

There are also a number of crossing points, including:

- Ekusileni pontoon (see photo at top of page).

== Development ==
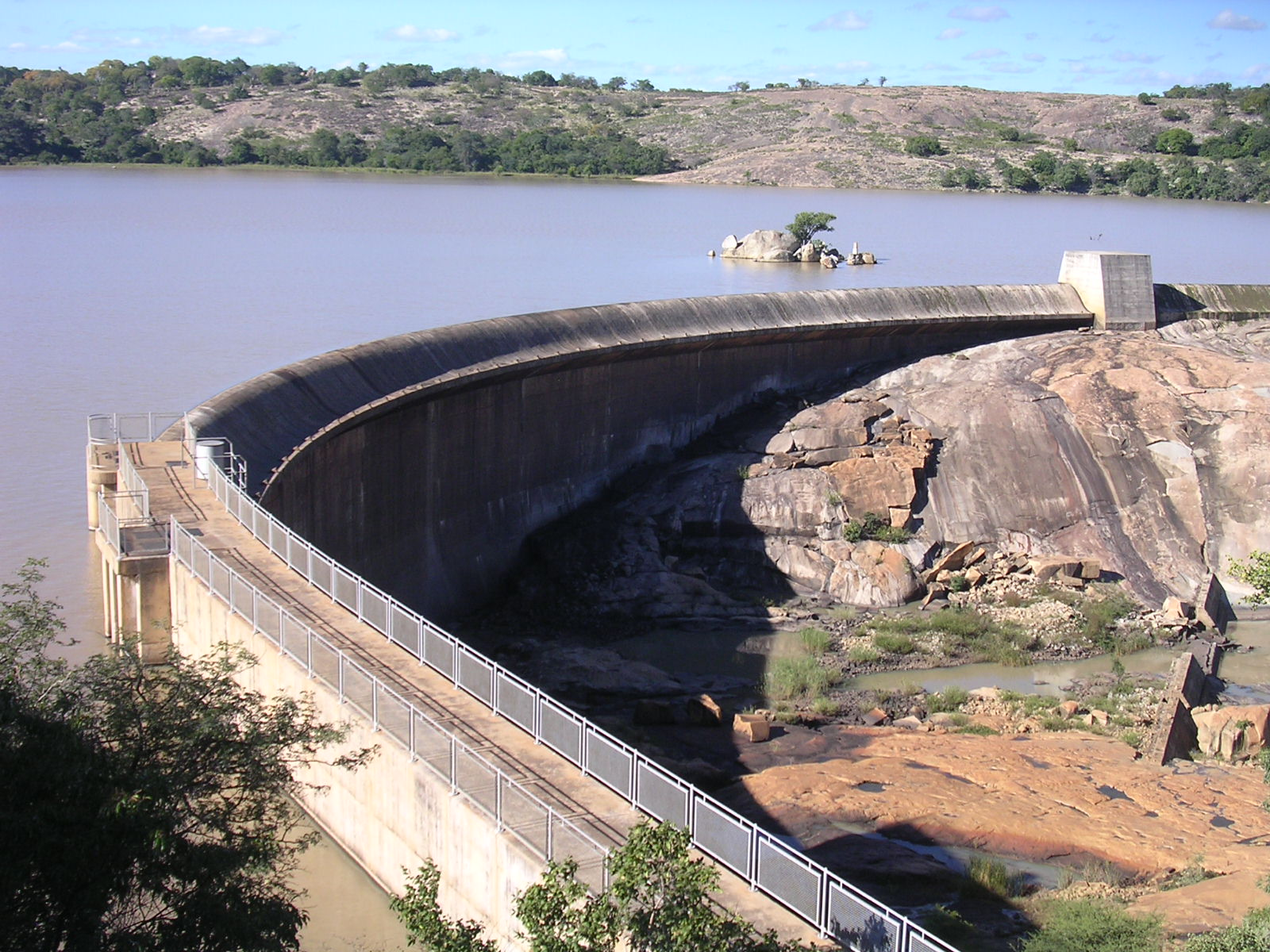
Silalabuhwa Dam.

In addition to a number of small weirs, there are four dams on the Insiza River:

- Upper Insiza Dam, near Fort Rixon, built in 1967 with a full supply capacity of 8,829 MCM (million cubic metres).
- Insiza Dam, previously known as Mayfair Dam and Lake Cunningham, built in 1973, with a full supply capacity of 173,491 MCM. It supplies water to the city of Bulawayo.
- Pangani Dam, near Filabusi, built to supply water for Pangani mine (now closed and site of a youth training institute.
- Silalabuhwa Dam, built in 1966, with a full supply capacity of 23,454 MCM. It is located near the confluence with the Mzingwane River and supplies water for irrigation to the Silalatshani Irrigation Scheme and to Colleen Bawn.
