= Lazarus Nkala =

Rhodesian union leader, activist and revolutionary (1927–1975)

- Born: 26 February 1927; Filabusi, Southern Rhodesia
- Died: 3 December 1975 (aged 48) near Gadade Mbembesi, Rhodesia
- Education: University of South Africa (BA)
- Occupations: Builder, trade union leader, activist, revolutionary
- Political party: African National Congress (1957–1959); National Democratic Party (1960–1961); Zimbabwe African People's Union (1961–1975)
- Spouse: Leah Nkala now 95 years old
- Children: 5
- Relatives: Enos Nkala (cousin)

Lazarus Nkala (26 February 1927 – 3 December 1975), known in political circles by the nickname UMavava, was a Rhodesian trade union leader, activist, and revolutionary. Born in Filabusi in Matabeleland, he attended mission and government schools, and trained as a builder. He worked in Bulawayo, and became a union leader and African nationalist activist. In the 1950s and 60s, he served in leadership roles in the Southern Rhodesia African National Congress, National Democratic Party, and Zimbabwe African People's Union. He was detained in 1964 and, with the exception of a three-week period the following year, was held in continuous detention for the next ten years. Upon his release in 1974, he was named Organising Secretary of the ANC, and attended the Victoria Falls Conference as part of Joshua Nkomo's delegation. He died shortly after in an automobile accident while driving from Salisbury (now Harare) to Bulawayo.

== Early life ==
Nkala was born on 26 February 1927 in Filabusi, Matabeleland, Southern Rhodesia. He comes from a large Ndebele family; one of his cousins, Enos, also became active in the independence movement and later served in parliament and as a cabinet minister. His father, Madiga Nkala, was a peasant farmer, teacher at the local Methodist mission school, and later a cobbler. His mother, Mbase Moyo, was a lay preacher of the American-led Brethren in Christ Church. Nkala was raised in the Brethren faith and attended primary school Nkankezi School and at the Church's Matopo Mission. He went on to study at Mzingwane High School in Essexvale (now Esigodini), where he became exposed to politics through fellow students, including Jason Moyo and others. There, he received elementary industrial instruction, trained as a bricklayer, and qualified as a builder in 1947.

== Career and political activity ==
Nkala worked in Bulawayo as a builder for many years. In 1950, he was elected chairman of the Bulawayo branch of the African Artisans' Union. He was elected president of the union in 1956, an office he held until his arrest in 1964. He also served for some time as president of the African Trade Union Congress' Matabeleland region. He was also appointed Chairman of the Barbourfields Tenants' Association and member of the Bulawayo African Townships Advisory Board.

In 1957, Nkala joined the Southern Rhodesia African National Congress, led by Joshua Nkomo, and served as treasurer for the organisation's Bulawayo branch until it was banned in 1959. He was a prominent figure in the African nationalist movement in Bulawayo, and was briefly detained after a state of emergency was declared by the colonial government in February 1959. He served as treasurer for the Bulawayo branch of the National Democratic Party (NDP), Nkomo's new party, from 1960 to 1961, when it, too, was banned. From 1961 to 1963, Nkala was the Bulawayo district chairman for the NDP's successor, the Zimbabwe African People's Union (ZAPU). In 1962, ZAPU was banned, and the next year, some of its members broke away and formed Zimbabwe African National Union (ZANU). Nkala remained loyal to Nkomo's organisation, while his cousin Enos joined ZANU. From 1963 to 1964, he served as National Organising Secretary of the People's Caretaker Council, a newly founded successor organisation to ZAPU that was the same in all but name.

On 23 April 1964, Nkala was detained by the Rhodesian government, and with the exception of a three-week period in April/May 1965, he remained in restriction or detention for over ten years. He was initially held at Gonakudzingwa restriction camp, but because of his strong influence on the morale of his fellow restrictees, was moved, along with Nkomo and Joseph Msika, to Camp 5, a more isolated location. There for four years, he had little human contact besides Nkomo and Msika, and began taking correspondence courses. He passed his A Levels and went on to receive a Bachelor of Arts in political science and public administration from the University of South Africa. He was released on 3 December 1974.

In December 1974, Nkala was named to the Central Committee of the African National Council (ANC), and attended the Victoria Falls Conference in August 1975 along with Nkomo as part of the ANC delegation. When the ANC split internally in September 1975, Nkala remained loyal to Nkomo's faction, and was named organising secretary at the party's congress, held in Salisbury (now Harare) on 26 and 27 September 1975.

== Death and legacy ==
Around 2:30 p.m., 3 December 1975, exactly one year after his release from detention, Nkala was killed on the Salisbury-Bulawayo Road near Gadade Mbembesi when his car overturned. The ANC colleague he was traveling with, Aggrippah Moyo, was also killed. A joint funeral held for Nkala and Moyo in Bulawayo was attended by thousands. Joshua Nkomo spoke at the burial, stating that Nkala's and Moyo's death would not be in vain, and that Zimbabweans would achieve the independence the two died while fighting for. Nkala left behind a widow and five children. He was buried at Pelandaba Cemetery in Bulawayo, and was declared a national hero after independence in 1980. In November 2019, 1st Avenue in Bulawayo was renamed Lazarus Nkala Avenue.
