= David Candler =

Zimbabwean cricketer and mathematician and clergyman

Personal information
- Full name: David Cecil Candler
- Born: 18 October 1924; Bulawayo, Southern Rhodesia
- Died: 17 April 2008 (aged 83); Little Barningham, Norfolk, England
- Batting: Right-handed
- Bowling: Leg break

Domestic team information
- Years: Team
- 1950–1951: Oxford University

Career statistics
Competition	First-class
Matches	5
Runs scored	115
Batting average	16.42
100s/50s	–/1
Top score	54
Balls bowled	6
Wickets	0
Bowling average	–
5 wickets in innings	–
10 wickets in match	–
Best bowling	–
Catches/stumpings	2/–
- Source: Cricinfo, 28 May 2020

David Cecil Candler (18 October 1924 – 17 April 2008) was a Zimbabwean first-class cricketer, mathematician, educator and clergyman.

Candler was born at Bulawayo in Southern Rhodesia in October 1924. He was educated at the Bulawayo Technical School, before studying in South Africa at the University of Cape Town. He played minor cricket matches for Rhodesia cricket team in 1945. He went up to Keble College at the University of Oxford as a Rhodes Scholar to study mathematics in 1948. While studying at Oxford, he played first-class cricket for Oxford University, making his debut against Gloucestershire at Oxford in 1950. He played first-class cricket for Oxford until 1951, making five appearances. Candler scored a total of 115 runs in his five matches, at an average of 16.42 and with a high score of 54. In addition to playing cricket for the university, Candler also played football for Keble College.

After graduating from Oxford, Candler returned to Southern Rhodesia where he became a senior mathematics lecturer at Bulawayo Technical College. In 1956, he attended St Paul's Theological College, Grahamstown and was ordained as a deacon in 1956, before becoming a priest in 1957. During this period he was chaplain to Falcon College at Esigodini, in addition to serving curate there in 1957–58. He helped to found St. Stephen's College, Balla Balla and served as its headmaster in 1958–59, before becoming an assistant master at Plumtree School in 1960, a post he would retain until 1980. During the Rhodesian Bush War of the 1960s and 1970s, the school at Plumtree came under threat of attack and a number of former pupils were killed. Alongside his teaching commitments at Plumtree, Candler also served in an ecclesiastical capacity as chaplain and priest-in-charge of Plumtree with Marula. He emigrated to the United Kingdom in the early 1980s, where he became rector of Little Barningham and North Barningham, which he held from 1985 until his retirement in 1994. He continued to take services in the surrounding parishes until just prior to his death from cancer in April 2008.
