= Inkankezi River =

River in Zimbabwe

Coordinates: 20.678563°S 29.377413°E

Inkankezi River is a river in Matebeleland South, Insiza District, Mtshingwe, in Zimbabwe. The river is always dry during the winter season due to its small size and its geographical location which is semi-arid.

The Nkankezi primary and secondary schools on the east side of the river along Bulawayo-Masvingo Road take their names from the river. Other villages close to Nkankezi river are 18A, 18B, 18C, 20 and 21.

The Inkankezi is the principal left-bank tributary of the Insiza River. It rises northeast of Filabusi, with its mouth at Silalabuhwa Dam.
