= St. Stephen's College, Balla Balla =

Defunct Christian high school in Rhodesia

St. Stephen's College, Balla Balla, Southern Rhodesia (later: Rhodesia) was a private Christian high school for boys from 1956 to 1975.

== History and operations of the school ==
The 1956 prospectus for St. Stephen's opens with a statement from Reverend Maurice Lancaster, "There has been for some time a growing conviction among parents that today there is a great need for their sons to receive at school not only a sound education to fit them to take their places as citizens, but also a well-based knowledge of Christianity and all it means...". To achieve this goal, the prospectus lists the aims of the college as follows: (a) to give the best possible secondary education for boys for the most reasonable terms; (b) to give a firm grounding in the Christian Faith as held and taught in the Book of Common Prayer and in the Formularies of the Church of the Province of South Africa; (c) to provide sound and wise discipline; and (d) to train for a full and useful life in the world. The school was built on 250 acres (1.0 km^{2}) of land offered by Mr. A. A. Sanderson.

The school opened on 1 February 1959, with 35 pupils, which soon increased to 40. The school uniform was a khaki outfit of shorts and shirt for everyday wear, and a dress uniform of long grey trousers, white shirts, black blazers and school tie for evenings in the dining hall. There were also prefect's ties and house honours ties, as well as two badges. One badge was a red cross bearing a St. Stephen's crown, while the other, the official and registered crest, was a combination of the Sanderson crest (talbot, torch and helmet), the Lancaster crest (red roses), and the crown of St. Stephen. The registered crest (as a blazer badge) was worn solely by Old Boys (former pupils); this is the badge still worn today by members of the St. Stephen's College Old Boys Association.

To provide the best Christian-based education at a reasonable cost, the founders originally planned to establish a monastery to accommodate teacher monks. However, by 1959, it became apparent that this was not feasible, and from then on, the board of governors employed teachers from Southern Rhodesia and the United Kingdom. The building originally constructed to be the monastery became Abbey House for juniors in 1968. Religious training included a Eucharist at 8 am and an Evensong at 6 pm on Sundays, a service in the chapel each day before classes began and House Prayers in the evening.

Pupils originally sat the Cambridge School Certificate examinations, but later General Certificate of Education (GCE) examinations at ordinary and advanced level (O-Level and A-Level) were marked by the Associated Examining Board (AEB) in England. Pupils intending to apply to universities in South Africa finished their schooling after taking intermediate examinations, called M-Level examinations, as these were the equivalent of the higher-grade matriculation examinations in South Africa. Pupils intending to apply to universities in Rhodesia or the United Kingdom proceeded to take the A-level examinations, which followed a further year of study. These two "final years" were termed the Lower VI (6th) Form and Upper VI (6th) Form, respectively.

Sport was an important part of the curriculum. St. Stephen's competed with other, larger, Rhodesian schools in rugby, cricket and hockey. In these sports, St. Stephen's was a keen rival of Falcon College, in nearby Essexvale.

Dances were held periodically and attended by young ladies from Evelyn, Townsend and other senior schools in Bulawayo. This social arrangement was reciprocal.

A unique aspect of life at St. Stephen's, was that the boys were allowed to go into the surrounding bush (bushveld), in groups of three, after chapel on Sundays. It was not uncommon for the pupils to see antelope, such as the large kudu and the smaller duiker, and snakes, such as the black mamba, puff adder and the African rock python. The school had an active Wildlife Club in the 1970s, and, with permission from the Rhodesian Department of National Parks and Wildlife, kept an impressive collection of snakes.

== Closing of St Stephen's ==
In 1963, when the Central African Federation came to an end with the break-up of the Federation of Rhodesia and Nyasaland, most of the students traveled to the school from outside Rhodesia; most of the students travelled to the school by coach from Zambia (formerly: Northern Rhodesia) or Malawi (formerly: Nyasaland), others arrived by plane and private vehicle from Botswana, Mozambique, and the Transvaal province of South Africa. The school continued with these students crossing the new borders to get to school.

In 1973, there were 219 pupils at St. Stephen's College. In this year, the Rhodesian government closed its border with Zambia and, even with the special dispensation given for students to cross the border, it became risky for pupils to travel. To make the border crossing at the Chirundu Bridge, over the Zambesi River, the boys had to change coaches while armed guards patrolled both sides of the border. After the border closure, it became difficult for parents in Zambia to transfer fees and enrollment dropped to 175 pupils. Under this pressure, the privately funded school closed in 1975.

Until early 2022 there was a memorial to St. Stephen's College, erected by the school's board of governors, where the entrance to the college used to be. It took the form of a semicircle, of three linked short columns, not far from the Beitbridge-Bulawayo road near the junction with the Filabusi road. On the centre column was the foundation stone, which had been unveiled by the Governor of Southern Rhodesia, Sir Peveril William-Powlett. The left column was a memorial plaque to the parents of Mr. Sanderson, previously on the college gates, and the plaque on the right column bore the names of the members of the school's board of governors and the headmasters. Today, only the core structure remains without the commemorative plaques.

<Dr Chris Hunn>

== Headmasters ==
- Rev. David Candler – 1959
- J.H.L. Fuller – 1960–65
- H.H. Cole, CBE – 1965–67
- Ian Campbell – 1968–73
- Brig. R.A.G. Prentice, OBE – 1973–75

== Alumni ==
As of 2007, former pupils of St. Stephen's College were living in at least 17 different countries. There is an active Old Boy's Association which meets regularly in South Africa, Australia and the United Kingdom.

== See also ==
- Christianity in Zimbabwe
- Education in Zimbabwe
- List of boarding schools
- List of schools in Zimbabwe

== Notes ==
- The Church of the Province of Central Africa, which included the Federation of Rhodesia and Nyasaland, was inaugurated in 1955; thus the reference to the Church of the Province of South Africa when St. Stephen's College was proposed in 1953. (In January 2007, the Church of the Province of South Africa changed its name to the Anglican Church of Southern Africa.)
- The Associated Examining Board (AEB) was incorporated into the Assessment and Qualifications Alliance (AQA) in 1997.
- The former Federation of Rhodesia and Nyasaland is, in 2007, the independent nations of Zambia, Zimbabwe and Malawi.
