= Nkala =

Nkala is a Zimbabwean surname. Notable people with the surname include:

- Elijah Nkala, Zimbabwean sprinter
- Enos Nkala, Zimbabwean politician
- Lazarus Nkala, Rhodesian trade union leader, activist, and revolutionary
- Lodumo Nkala, South African entrepreneur
- Mluleki Nkala, Zimbabwean cricketer
