= Ndabezinhle Sibanda Sigogo =

Zimbabwean writer

Ndabezinhle Sibanda Sigogo was a Zimbabwean writer born on 2 June 1932 in Filabusi District (Matebeleland). He died in 2006. His father, who had ten wives, died when he was six years old. According to custom, his father's brother took care of the deceased's wives and children, leading to his mother leaving. As a young boy, he had an unsettled life, full of anxieties and fears.

== Early life ==
Sigogo experienced a typical rural childhood hoarding cattle. His formal schooling went to Standard 6. He was a boarder at Wanezi Mission.In the early 1950s, he began working as an untrained teacher. From 1951 to 1956 he taught at the Catholic mission schools Empandeni (near Plumtree) and Gwanda (Filabusi). Then he changed employers, working for the Native Affairs Department because they paid better salaries. From 1960 to 1969, Sigogo worked as a clerk and messenger for the District Commissioner at Filabusi and at Shurugwi.

== Literary career ==
Sigogo is considered the most widely read Ndebele author in Zimbabwe. His career was launched after winning a writing competition run by the Rhodesia Literature Bureau in 1961 resulting in his first novel, USethi ebukhweni bakhe, being published a year later, in 1962. Thereafter, Sigogo's work started appearing in anthologies and being broadcast regularly on radio. In 1969, he joined Mambo Press publishing house in Gweru as an editor for their Ndebele manuscripts; in 1975, he became editorial officer at the Rhodesia Literature Bureau branch in Bulawayo. Through his own writings, and his work as an editor, Sigogo inspired generations of Ndebele writers who came after him.

== Publications ==
USethi ebukhweni bakhe (Rhodesia Literature Bureau, 1961)

Akugobo lingeqondiswe (Longman, 1981)

Umhlaba umangele (Mambo Press, 1984)

Asazi-ke (College Press, 1986)

Kunjalo (Longman, 1991)

Iziga zalintombi (Mambo Press, 1997)

Lapho intsha isivukile (College Press, 1999)

Amandla othando (Mambo Press, 2005)

Noma sengifile (College Press, 2007)
