= Fylde =

Fylde could refer to

- The Fylde, a coastal plain in Lancashire, England, or, within it:
  - Borough of Fylde, a local government district
  - Fylde (UK Parliament constituency)
  - FY postcode area covering the western side of the Fylde
  - AFC Fylde, an association football club
  - Fylde Ladies F.C., an association football club
  - Fylde Rugby Club, a rugby club in Lytham St Annes
- Fylde Air Base, Zimbabwe
- Fylde College, Lancaster University – named after the Lancashire coastal plain
- Fylde Guitars
