= Umzingwane District =

Umzingwane District Essexvale District
- administrative district
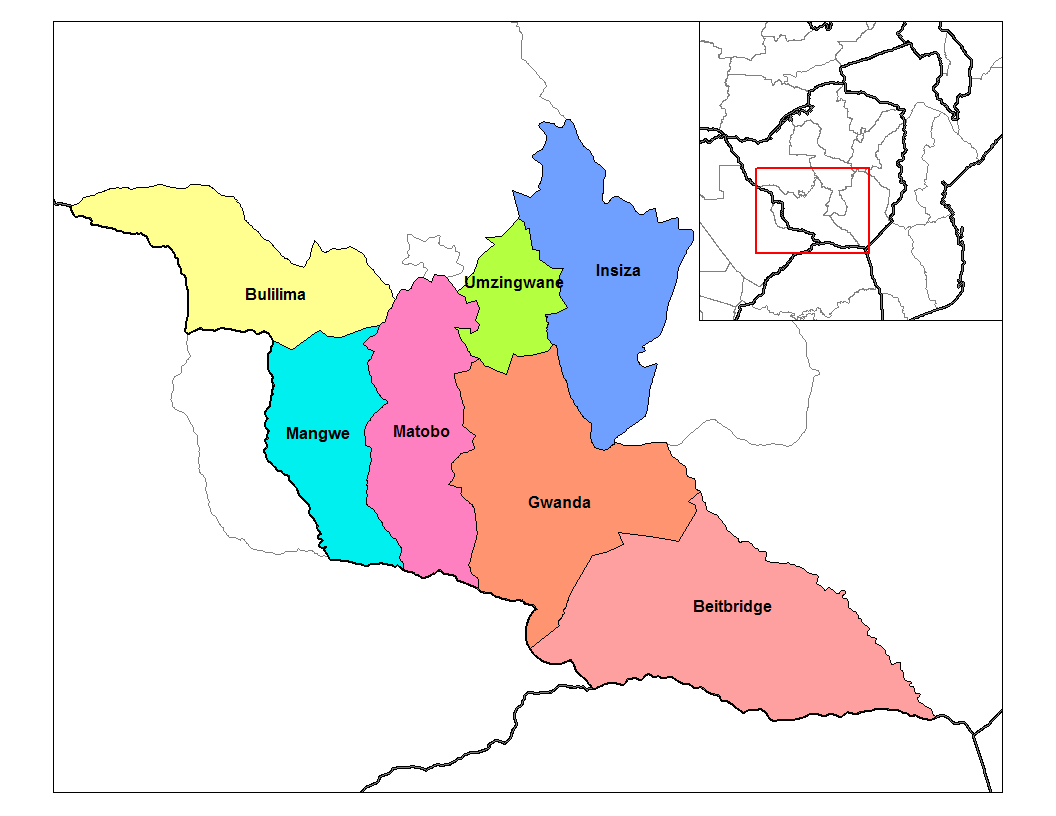
- Umzingwane District in Matabeleland South
- Coordinates: 20°20′49″S 28°56′59″E
- Country: Zimbabwe
- Province: Matabeleland South

Area
  - Total: 2,797 km^{2} (1,080 sq mi)
- Elevation: 1,176 m (3,858 ft)

Population (2022)
  - Total: 71,860
- Time zone: UTC+2 (CAT)

Umzingwane is a district in the northern part of Matabeleland South province in Zimbabwe. It was formerly known as Esigodini and before 1982 as Essexvale.

Its governing seat is located in the village of Umzingwane.

== Geography ==
Umzingwane District is located in the province of Matabeleland South with its main administrative council offices at Esigodini.

Umzingwane District lies just south-east of Bulawayo City, the second largest city in Zimbabwe, and to the south of Umguza District of Matabeleland North. Within Matabeleland South, Umzingwane district borders the following districts: Insiza, Gwanda and Matopo.

The district lies almost entirely in the watershed of the Umzingwane River, a left tributary of the Limpopo, but also, in its western regions, includes portions of the Mtshabezi watershed. The district has several recreational parks, including the twelve square kilometers of Umzingwane Recreational Park (aka Umzingwane Dam Reserve), the forty-two square kilometers of Lake Cunningham Recreational Park, and including parts of Matobo National Park.

The terrain in Umzingwane District is varied from the granite inselbergs and koppies (kojies) of the Motobo Hills to flat alluvial plains along the lower drainages.

== History ==
In the early 19th century, the Northern Ndebele invaded and settled in the Esigodini area which was at the time inhabited by the Rozi and Moyo Karanga people, who themselves had migrated north from the territory around Gwanda and Belingwe.

A township of some 200,000 acres was founded in 1894 as Essexvale, by Frederick C. Selous In 1896 the buildings at Essexvale were burned down by Inxnozan (Inxnogan), during the Matabele Rebellion.

== Places in Umzingwane ==
- Bezha, a village, birthplace of Professor Thomas Dube, academic and lawyer who served as senior legal and political affairs advisor for 19 years at United Nations Security Council.
- Bonjeni, a village
- Bushtick, a village
- Bushtick Mine
- Esibomvu, a village
- Esigodini, administrative centre
- Esiphezini, birthplace of Canaan Banana, first president of Zimbabwe
- Doyana, a village
- How Mine, a gold mine
- Inyankuni reservoir
- Impu, a village
- Dula, a village
- Zidlabusuku, a village
- Kumbuzi, a village
- Lumene Falls
- Mtshabezi dam
- Matendele, a village
- Irisvale, a village
- Mawabeni, a village
- Mbizingwe, a village
- Mpisini, a village
- Malungwane, a village
- Malilangwe, a village
- Bayethe, a village
- Ntabende, a village
- Godlwayo, a village
- Zimbili, a village
- Mzingwane Dam reservoir
- Mzingwane River (Umzingwane River)
- Nsezi, a village.Home of late President Canaan Banana and his burial place
- Nswazi, a village
- Selous House Homestake, historical site
- Sihlengeni, a village
- Upper and Lower Ncema reservoirs
- Esigodini District Hospital

== Administration and politics ==
Umzingwane District has government headquarters located in the village of Umzingwane, and by the Umzingwane Rural District Council, which has its offices in Esigodini. The district is divided into twenty administrative wards. Traditionally the district is divided into four parts, each ruled by a local chieftain.

- Esiphezini Communal Land tribal area
- uMzinyathini Communal Land
- Nswazi Communal Land

== Economy ==
In 2012, Umzingwane District had 48 percent of the economically active population employed in agriculture (primarily farming and livestock production), 17 percent employed in services occupations, 17 percent employed in mining and construction and 2 percent employed in educational institutions.
