= Shangani Solar Power Station =

Solar farm in Zimbabwe

- Country: Zimbabwe
- Location: Ensangu Estate, Shangani, Insiza District, Matabeleland South Province
- Coordinates: 19°47′10″S 29°21′31″E
- Status: Proposed
- Construction began: 2022 Expected
- Commission date: 2023 Expected
- Construction cost: US$45.2 million
- Owner: Shangani Renewable Energy

Solar farm
- Type: Flat-panel PV

Power generation
- Nameplate capacity: 25 MW (34,000 hp)

The Shangani Solar Power Station is a proposed 25 megawatts solar power plant in Zimbabwe. The project is under development by a Zimbabwean independent power producer (IPP), called Shangani Renewable Energy. It is expected that when this power station begins commercial operations, the energy generated here will be sold to the Zimbabwe Electricity Supply Authority (ZESA), for integration into the national grid.

== Location ==
The power station is located in the locality of Ensangu Estate, in Shangani, Insiza District, in Matabeleland South Province. Shangani is located approximately 19 kilometres (12 mi), east of Insiza, the location of the district headquarters. This is about 99 kilometres (62 mi) northeast of Bulawayo, the nearest large city.

== Overview ==
As of 2014, Zimbabwe's electricity needs amounted to 2,200 megawatts. Existing installed hydropower and coal-fired thermal stations at that time were only able to supply 75 percent of that need. In order to mitigate prolonged and recalcitrant power blackouts, solar and wind sources of energy are the country's most reliable alternatives.

The owner/developer plans to install a ground-mounted solar panel power station with generation capacity of 25 megawatts. A new 11kV evacuation line will be constructed as part of this project. The new transmission line will carry the power to the existing 132kV/11kV electric substation at Shangani, about 4 kilometres (2 mi) from the solar farm, where the energy will enter the national grid.

== Developers ==
The solar park is under development by a Zimbabwean IPP, Shangani Renewable Energy Private Limited, who also own the power station. When completed the same company is expected to operate and maintain the renewable energy infrastructure project.

== Construction costs ==
The cost of construction for this solar farm is quoted at approximately US$45.2 million.

== See also ==
- List of power stations in Zimbabwe
- Colleen Bawn Solar Power Station
