= Gifford High School =

- Bulawayo; Zimbabwe

Information
- Type: Government school, Government funded
- Motto: Hinc Orior (Latin: From here, I arise)
- Established: 1927
- Headmistress: B. Dewa
- Gender: Boys School single-sex education
- Enrollment: 800+
- Language: English, Ndebele
- Colors: silver and Maroon

Gifford High School is a government-owned boys-only high school in Bulawayo, Zimbabwe. The school was founded in 1927 as the Bulawayo Technical School led by Mr Philip Henry Gifford and four teachers, with an enrolment of 39 pupils.

== Timeline ==
- 1927 - Bulawayo Technical School Established, Philip Henry Gifford appointed Headmaster
- 1929 - The new School building was opened
- 1931 - High School status achieved, Founder of the Old Technicians’ Association
- 1933 - Beit Hall was presented by the Trust
- 1947 - Henry John Sutherby appointed Headmaster
- 1953 - Andrew Hart appointed Headmaster, Move to Matopos Road opposite to the Zimbabwe International Trade Fair (ZITF) Showgrounds
- 1961 - Donald Robert White appointed Headmaster, The Bulawayo Technical School becomes Gifford Technical High School (GTHS)
- 1962 - Philip Henry Gifford dies,
- 1967 - Ivor John McLachlan appointed Headmaster
- 1974 - Harry Fincham appointed Headmaster, McLachlan Pool named in honour of Headmaster Ivor John McLachlan
- 1974 - School renamed Gifford High School as a result of its change to a comprehensive high school offering the same range of subjects as other high schools.
- 1976 - Old South Field renamed the Sutherby Field in honour of Headmaster Henry John Sutherby. Andrew Hart Field is named in honour of Headmaster Andrew Hart
- 1977 - Jubilee celebrations (50th Anniversary)
- 1983 - Anthony Menne appointed Headmaster
- 2003 - Siziba appointed Headmaster
- 2006 - Moyo appointed Headmaster
- 2009 - J.T. Nzima appointed Headmaster

== Emblems ==
The School's colours are maroon and silver, and the motto is Hinc Orior meaning “from here I arise”, or, more freely, “from these beginnings my formed mind springs.” These colours were registered in 1957.

== School Development Association (SDA) ==
The school is administered by the Gifford High School Development Association in terms of Statutory instrument 379 of 1998 – Education (School Development Associations) Government Schools) Regulations [Zimbabwe]

The SDA is composed of parents or legal guardians of pupils enrolled at school and Teachers employed by the school. The affairs of school are administered by an Executive Committee of the SDA which has a minimum of 7 and maximum of 11 members, with a duration of office 1 year (renewable). Office bearers are elected at an AGM by April of each year. SDA meetings are convened by the Executive Committee or at least one third of the members of the SDA. Voting decisions at SDA meetings are by majority or secret ballot if ten (10) or more members request this. Fiscal year is calendar year ending 31 December.

== Headmasters ==
Period	Headmaster	Comment/Achievements
1927–1947	Philip Henry Gifford	Founding Headmaster. School renamed in his honour. Officer of the Order of the British Empire
1947–1959	Henry John Sutherby	Founder of the Old Technicians’ Association (1931). Old South Field renamed the Sutherby Field (1976)
1953–1961	Andrew Hart	One of the School fields named the Andrew Hart Field 1976
1962–1966	Donald Robert White	Consolidating and extending the academic base of the School
1967–1973	Ivor John McLachlan	McLachlan Pool name in his honour (1974).Started the School's weekly newsletter, The Bee Hive (1967). Introduced the School's premier award, the Gifford Award
1974–1983	Harry Fincham	
1983–2003	Anthony Menne	
2003–2006	Siziba	
2006–2009	M.K. Moyo	
2009–2022	J.T. Nzima	
2023–present	B dewa	

== Sports ==
- Athletics
- Basketball
- Cricket
- Rugby
- Soccer
- Tennis
- Volleyball

== Alumni ==
Gifford High School alumni are referred to as "Old Technicians", the name being derived from the original Bulawayo Technical School name.

Notable alumni include:

- Brian Davison, cricketer
- John Love, racing driver
- Gary Hocking, motorcycle racing rider
- Oscar Bonginkosi Mdlongwa,"Oskido" musician
- Ronnie Hill, Springbok Rugby player
