= Bushtick Mine =

Coordinates: 20°12′31″S 28°58′11″E

Bushtick Mine was a gold mining operation established in the 1920s and operative through early 1950s in Essexvale District, Matabeleland in Southern Rhodesia (now Zimbabwe). It was established by the British South Africa Company.

The mine was a substantial producer of gold and, initially, thought to be part of a significant deposit of the precious metal in the area. This did not prove to be the case and after the mine was closed its facilities were to become the basis of Falcon College, which was a higher education level school for boys aged 12-18, but now incorporates girls of the same age. It is located 12 kilometers from Esigodini (old Essexvale). Frederick Courtney Selous, the noted scout, hunter, conservationist and adventurer, had his farm nearby. The foundations of the house can be viewed on Google Earth if one follows the road west from Falcon College to Mike Mylnes' farm, then over the river and north along the Lunga River. At a bend in the river where Selous used to view elephants from his verandah one can make out the vague outline of the foundations of his house.
