= Iain Campbell (cricketer) =

English cricketer

Personal information
- Full name: Iain Parry Campbell
- Born: 5 February 1928; Purley, Surrey, England
- Died: 31 May 2015 (aged 87); Taupō, New Zealand
- Batting: Right-handed
- Role: Wicket-keeper

Domestic team information
- Years: Team
- 1946: Kent
- 1949–1951: Oxford University

Career statistics
Competition	First-class
Matches	22
Runs scored	482
Batting average	15.06
100s/50s	0/1
Top score	60*
Catches/stumpings	25/16
- Source: Cricinfo, 25 January 2017

Iain Parry Campbell (5 February 1928 – 31 May 2015) was an English sportsman and schoolteacher. Campbell was born in England and later taught and lived in Rhodesia and then New Zealand, where he retired. He played hockey for England and both cricket and rugby union for Kent as well as being a good all-round sportsman.

== Sporting career ==
Campbell was educated at Canford School and Trinity College, Oxford. At Canford he excelled at rugby union, hockey, squash, tennis, athletics and cricket, captaining the school first team in all six sports. As captain of the cricket team in 1946, his final year, he scored 1,277 runs at an average of 116, including an innings of 222 not out in 150 minutes and another of 237 in 106 minutes. He was seen as one of the most promising schoolboy batsmen in the country. Writing in Wisden on that year's schools cricket, E. M. Wellings said:

Campbell had methods all of his own, rough and ready by precise standards but very effective for all that. ... He has so far avoided text-book dogmas, and he has it in him to become a fine slogger. His eye seemingly allows him to hook without moving the right foot across the wicket, to cut the ball very near the off stump, to drive cross-batted and to hit across the line of the ball. A good eye, confidence and exceptional power of strike are natural assets which add up to a large sum.

He was unable to repeat his schoolboy success at first-class level. In one match for Kent County Cricket Club in 1946, and 18 matches for Oxford University between 1949 and 1951, he played chiefly as a wicket-keeper. He hit his highest score in 1951 against Leicestershire, when he scored 60 not out between going to the wicket with the score at 54 for 6 and the fall of the last wicket at 142. He toured Canada with Marylebone Cricket Club (MCC) in 1951, playing in the first-class match against the Canadian national team, and played his final first-class match against Ireland in Dublin in 1954.

Campbell was a good all-round sportsman and won a Blue in hockey at Oxford. He went on to win an England cap in the sport. He played rugby union for Blackheath, Kent and London Counties and had a trial for the Scotland national team.

== Teaching career ==
Campbell became a schoolteacher. He taught at King's School, Worcester, Rugby and Cranleigh in England, and Peterhouse in Rhodesia before becoming headmaster of St Stephen's College in Rhodesia from 1968 to 1973.

He was headmaster of King's College, Auckland, from 1973 until 1987, when he retired. He was a uniting and moderating headmaster of King's after a relatively authoritarian era under the previous headmaster, and introduced co-education to the school in 1980.

He later lived in Taupō, New Zealand, and died at home on 31 May 2015. He and his wife Anne were married for 62 years.
