= Frederick Goldstein =

Personal information
- Full name: Frederick Steven Goldstein
- Born: 14 October 1944; Bulawayo, Rhodesia
- Died: 3 December 2017 (aged 73); Claremont, Cape Town, South Africa
- Batting: Right-handed
- Bowling: Right-arm off-spin

Domestic team information
- Years: Team
- 1966–1969: Oxford University
- 1969: Northamptonshire
- 1969–70 to 1970–71: Transvaal
- 1971–72 to 1977–78: Western Province

Career statistics
Competition	First-class	List A
Matches	89	23
Runs scored	4810	509
Batting average	30.25	22.13
100s/50s	2/32	0/3
Top score	155	91
Balls bowled	120	–
Wickets	1	–
Bowling average	53.00	–
5 wickets in innings	–	–
10 wickets in match	–	–
Best bowling	1/3	–
Catches/stumpings	60/–	4/–
- Source: CricketArchive, 15 March 2014

Frederick Steven Goldstein (14 October 1944 – 3 December 2017) was a cricketer who played first-class cricket in England and South Africa from 1966 to 1977.

== Education ==
After attending Falcon College in Rhodesia, Goldstein was awarded a Rhodes Scholarship to St Edmund Hall, Oxford in 1965. He went on to win a first.

== Cricket in England ==
=== Oxford University ===
A hard-hitting opening batsman, in his first match for Oxford University in the 1966 season Goldstein made 65 and 78 against Gloucestershire when no other Oxford batsman made more than 32. He later top-scored in both innings against Middlesex with 42 and 39. He played in the University match and finished the season with 583 runs at 34.29 in nine matches. Wisden noted that "Goldstein, in his first year, hit form straight away with an impressive combination of solid defence and enterprising strokes".

He was only moderately successful in 1967, but in a weak team his 572 runs at 22.83 in 12 matches was the second-highest aggregate. Wisden noted that he "again showed his strength as an efficient and brisk opener". His highest score was 66 against Somerset, a match in which he also took six catches.

In 1968 he captained the side, and in 14 matches scored 945 runs at 42.95. He finished ninth in the national batting averages. The highlight was his first century, 155 against Cambridge University at Lord's, scored in three and a half hours with 25 fours and three sixes. He made all 53 runs as the score advanced from 125 to 178, and when he was second man out, the score was only 206. He also scored 54 in the second innings, reaching his fifty in 52 minutes.

In 1969 he became only the fourth player in the twentieth century to captain Oxford in more than one season. He again led the batting, with 864 runs at 36.00. Wisden noted that he "on occasions gave the innings a thrilling start with his powerful hitting, but there were other times when he lost his wicket through attempting to be too aggressive when the situation demanded caution". His highest score was 87, fourth out at 121, against Warwickshire, which he equalled with a "blistering" innings of 87 against Kent. Other boisterous innings included 76 in pursuit of victory against Lancashire, when he hit three successive sixes off the bowling of Jack Simmons and was second out with the score on 92. He also captained a combined Oxford and Cambridge XI against the touring West Indies cricket team, scoring 78 in 80 minutes. He made 43 and 69 (with 14 fours) against Cambridge, but as in the 1968 University match he was unable to force victory in his final match for Oxford. In 47 matches for Oxford over four seasons he made 2964 runs at 34.06, with 21 scores of 50 or more but only one century.

=== Northamptonshire and other English cricket ===
In 1968 Goldstein played seven one-day matches for the International Cavaliers. After the 1969 university season he joined Northamptonshire. Opening the batting with Hylton Ackerman, he played 10 matches and scored 437 runs at 25.70 with a top score of 90 (out of a team total of 220) against Glamorgan. He also played ten matches for the county in the 40-over Player's County League, but scored only 138 runs in 10 innings.

== Cricket in South Africa ==
Goldstein moved to South Africa after the 1969 season and played one match for Transvaal B in 1969–70. He played six first-class matches for Transvaal B and two for Transvaal in 1970–71, with a top score of 51. He opened the batting for Transvaal in the final of the 60-over Gillette Cup in 1970–71 and made 82.

He transferred to Western Province and played a few matches in 1971–72 and 1972–73. He top-scored with 77 in the final of the 1972–73 Gillette Cup, helping Western Province to victory. In 1973–74 he played his only full South African season, scoring 500 runs in nine first-class matches at 29.41. He scored 104, his second first-class century, in the Currie Cup against Natal, adding 175 for the second wicket with Hylton Ackerman.

He continued to play occasionally until 1977–78 with moderate success. He made his highest limited-overs score of 91 in the semi-final of the 1974–75 Gillette Cup to help Western Province into the final.

== Outside cricket ==
=== Information technology ===
Goldstein worked at the University of Cape Town (UCT) Information Technology Department for many years, starting in 1971 as Senior Systems Programmer and becoming a professor. He was involved in the early days of the Internet in South Africa. As Director of the Information Technology Department, he provided support at a policy and strategic level to set up an internet link between UCT and Rhodes University in Grahamstown.
