= Quiet Waters =

Conservation project in Zimbabwe

Coordinates: 20.1965°S 28.9713°E

Quiet Waters is a conservation project run by Falcon College in Zimbabwe. The founding committee of Quiet Waters met for the first time on 24 October 1985. It was at this meeting that the initial ideas of the development of Quiet Waters were born.

== History ==
The project began in 1986, and it was officially opened in 1988. It consists of a nature reserve and wilderness area, which covered an area of 8.1 km^{2} in all. Quiet Waters aims to conserve indigenous fauna and flora, to further the educational pursuits of the college, and to serve as a base for conservation education in other schools. It is also used for scientific research, providing recreational facilities for the college community and visitors.

== Key facts about the Quiet Waters Conservation Scheme ==
- The conservancy, which lies in the attractive hilly country to the north of the college, consists of two parts: The western game-fenced nature reserve of approximately 320 hectares, and the wilderness area of 490 hectares in the east.
- It has a very diverse range of fauna and flora. There are 12 recorded mammal species ranging from the giraffe to the minute spiny mouse. Other species, such as baboon, vervet monkey, banded mongoose, hyrax, warthog, klipspringer, duiker, impala, kudu, reedbuck, bushbuck, eland, tsessebe, and zebra are often seen. The last four have been introduced. Also, over 300 bird species have been identified.
- There are also over 100 species of trees. 50 grass species have been recorded.
- Other recorded fauna are 25 different snakes and 30 butterfly species.
- Research continues on other forms of animal and plant life.
- The game-fenced nature reserve has an impressive list of facilities, which are available to the Falcon community, which includes parents and friends of the college, as well as other educational institutions. These include nature trails, picnic sites, a campsite with four well-equipped A-framed chalets, viewing points and hides and artificial game pans.
- The new Mbonisa weir, which was recently officially opened, by Jimmy and Jenny Goddard has been stocked with bream and bass.
- It is a biology, geography and environmental management O and A level classes for fieldwork exercises extensively use the area.
- There are Junior and Senior Natural History Societies; the Angling Club and Junior Forms' Adventure Courses also make regular use of the facilities.
- In the past, schools such as Girls' College, Carmel and Whitestone from Bulawayo and Murray McDougal from Chiredzi, have utilised Quiet Waters for educational purposes. In the case of Carmel and Whitestone, ecology courses have been designed and run by Falcon staff, assisted by schoolboys.

There are six picnic sites which are available to parents who visit Quiet Waters. They all have a thatched shelter, toilet facilities and braai sites with wood provided. These are regularly used by the boys who camp there overnight during weekends.
