= Siwaze River =

Coordinates: 20.844773°S 29.492678°E

Location
- Country: Zimbabwe

Physical characteristics
- Source
  - location: Avoca, Zimbabwe
- Mouth
  - location: Insiza River

Siwaze River is a river in Zimbabwe. It is a tributary of the Insiza River.

The river is dammed by Siwaze Mountain, providing a water supply for a nearby irrigation scheme, as well as livestock and domestic use.
