= Colleen Bawn Solar Power Station =

Power station in Zimbabwe

- Country: Zimbabwe
- Location: Colleen Bawn, Gwanda District, Matabeleland South Province
- Coordinates: 21°01′05″S 29°11′59″E
- Status: Under construction
- Construction began: 2021 (Expected)
- Commission date: 2023 (Expected)
- Owner: Pretoria Portland Cement Limited

Solar farm
- Type: Flat-panel PV

Power generation
- Nameplate capacity: 32 MW (43,000 hp)

The Colleen Bawn Solar Power Station is a 32 MW (43,000 hp) solar power plant under development in Zimbabwe. The project is owned by Pretoria Portland Cement Limited, who own a cement factory in Colleen Bawn and plan to consume 16 megawatts of the electricity generated and sell the rest to the Zimbabwe national grid.

== Location ==
The power station is located in the town of Colleen Bawn, Gwanda District, in Matabeleland South Province, approximately 59 kilometres (37 mi), by road, east of Gwanda, the location of the district and provincial headquarters. Colleen Bawn is approximately 191 kilometres (119 mi), by road, southeast of Bulawayo, Zimbabwe's second-largest city. The factory would sit adjacent of PPC's cement factory in Colleen Bawn.

== Overview ==
The power station is designed to have capacity of 32 megawatts. The cement factory is expected to consume 16 megawatts. The remaining output is expected to be sold directly to the Zimbabwe Electricity Transmission and Distribution Company (ZETDC) for integration into the national grid, under a long-term power purchase agreement.

== Developers ==
The power station is being developed by a Zimbabwean power development investor, with technical partners in South Africa. The consortium of developers is expected to be revealed when all funding arrangements have been completed. The developers were selected out of a field of 38 companies that responded to the tender. The developers of the power station will operate it, on behalf of the owners.

In May 2022, Afrik21.africa reported that the development contract was awarded to CentraWest. The construction contractor is a consortium of Sinohydro of China and African Transmission Corporation Holdings (ATC), "a consultancy firm specializing in infrastructure projects". The cost of construction is budgeted at US$40 million.

== Construction ==
It is expected that once construction starts, it will take eighteen months to complete the power station. Construction began in May 2022 with commercial commissioning anticipated in the fourth quarter of 2023. In May 2022, it was disclosed that a battery energy storage system (BESS) of 9MW/18MWh will be incorporated in the design.

== See also ==
- List of power stations in Zimbabwe
- Shangani Solar Power Station
