= Falcon College =

Boarding school in Esigodini, Zimbabwe

- Falcon College Badge

Location
- Esigodini, Matabeleland South; Zimbabwe; 20°12′24″S 28°58′01″E

Information
- Type: Independent, boarding school
- Motto: Sic itur ad astra (Latin: Reach for the stars)
- Denomination: Interdenominational
- Established: 3 February 1954
- Headmaster: David Kirkman
- Forms: 1—6
- Gender: Co-educational
- Age: 12 to 18
- Enrollment: 510 Approx (2025)
- Campus type: Rural
- Houses: 6
- Publication: The Falcon
- Tuition: US$$5,750 (2026) (Note: Termly fees, the year has 3 terms.)
- Affiliations: ATS; CHISZ
- Alumni: Falcon Old Boys
- Website: www.falconcollege.com

Falcon College (or simply Falcon) is an independent boarding school for boys and girls aged 12–18 in the southern Matabeleland region of Zimbabwe. It was founded in 1954 near Essexvale, Federation of Rhodesia and Nyasaland (now Esigodini, Zimbabwe), 55 km southeast of Bulawayo on the remains of the Bushtick Mine. The College's graduates include a British member of parliament, surgeons and doctors, leaders of industry and commerce, soldiers, educators, and sportspeople.

The college has 40 km^{2} of Matabeleland bush, 10 km^{2} approximately is game fenced and houses Quiet Waters game park. The park contains examples of most of Zimbabwe's plains game species, including zebra, giraffe, kudu, impala, tsessebe, bushbuck and warthog. The campus is surrounded by an electric fence (a reminder of the bush war of pre-1980). An air strip is nearby.

The school's motto is Sic itur ad astra and the school badge is a representation of a Lanner Falcon designed by the wife of a former Headmaster.

Falcon College is ranked as one of the Top 10 High Schools in Zimbabwe.

Falcon College is a member of the Association of Trust Schools (ATS) and the Headmaster is a member of the Conference of Heads of Independent Schools in Zimbabwe (CHISZ).

In December 2015 Falcon became a coeducational school accepting girls in January 2016.

== Historical background ==
Originally Bushtick Mine, and with 36 boys and a handful of staff, the college was founded on Wednesday 3 February 1954. It was opened by the Governor General of the Federation of Rhodesia and Nyasaland, Lord Llewellin, on Saturday 10 April 1954. Much has changed since then but the college has some remains of its founding days.

The original motto was Arduus ad Solem. The newer Motto is: Sic Itur Ad Astra The school motto comes from the words of Virgil (70-19BC) a classical Roman poet who wrote: “nova virtute, puer; sic itur ad astra” which translates: Look to your new-found courage, young man, for that is the way to the stars.

In the beginning, the boys were divided into three colour groups for sport, Whites, Blues, and Khakis. Later, the houses were named A, B, C, and D, and in April 1956, Sir Robert Clarkson Tredgold, chairman of the Board of Governors, announced that the houses were to be renamed Hervey, Oates, Tredgold, and Founders. Founders was so named to commemorate the Founders of the School; Tredgold after Sir Robert Clarkson Tredgold, who was also Chief Justice of Southern Rhodesia; Oates after Frank Oates, explorer and naturalist who travelled extensively in southern central Africa in the 19th century; and Hervey after Hubert Hervey, adventurer, gentleman and soldier, who was killed in the Second Matabele War and buried in the Matopos.

== Student body ==
The College admittance is based on strength of prior education and character of the applicant. Although the majority of students are Zimbabwean, roughly 20% comprise residents from neighbouring countries (Zambia, Botswana). Some scholarships are available to deserving students whose particular financial circumstances do not allow for the payment of school fees.

== The house system ==
The school is based on a house system that is divided into six houses; Founders, Hervey, Oates, Tredgold, George Grey and Chubb, each comprising the full range of year groups. Each house has a housemaster in charge who lives nearby. Each housemaster has a house tutor and two assistant tutors, as well as other members of staff, who assist in duties. Girls are all members of Kestrel, their residential house, but are also assigned sporting houses as for the boys. Kestrel has two housemistresses.

Boys and girls can either go home, or (with parental permission) to friends or relatives on two fixture-free weekends which last from break time on a Friday to dinner time on the following Monday. There is a mid-term Exeat which is a day longer. In addition, there are three floating exeats but these must be spent with parents.

== Quiet Waters Conservation Scheme ==
The project began in 1986 and was officially opened in 1988. It consists of a Nature Reserve and Wilderness Area which cover 8.1 km^{2}. Quiet Waters conserves indigenous fauna and flora, furthers the educational pursuits of the college and serves as a base for conservation education in other schools. It is also used for scientific research and provides recreational facilities for the college community and visitors.

Picnic sites are available for the use of day visitors within the Nature Reserve area, with four chalets which can be rented for overnight stays in the Wilderness area.

Animals which can be seen are kudu, zebra, giraffe, reedbuck, bushbuck, steenbok, tsessebe, impala, klipspringer, bushpig and warthog and the two species of jackal, while there are many smaller mammals which are not so easily seen, such as four species of mongoose.

== Headmasters ==
- Frank Cary (1954–1955)
- Ashley Gordon Brooker (1955–1959)
- Hugh Cole (1959–1960)
- Dougal Turner (1960–1984)
- Neil Todd (1984–2000)
- Gordon Macdonald (2001)
- Reginald W Querl (2002–2019)
- Dave van Wyk (2020–2024)
- Dave Kirkman (2024–present)

== Notable alumni ==
- Brendan Ashby, swimmer.
- David Beresford, reporter.
- Glen Bruk-Jackson, cricketer.
- Christopher Cowdray, hotel executive.
- David Curtis, rugby player.
- Ethan Dube, cricketer.
- Dion Ebrahim, cricketer.
- Craig Evans, cricketer and rugby player.
- Gavin Ewing, cricketer.
- Neil Ferreira, cricketer.
- Keith A.A. Fox, Duke of Edinburgh Professor of Cardiology, University of Edinburgh
- Frederick Goldstein, cricketer, Rhodes Scholar
- Sunu Gonera, film director and producer.
- A. C. Grayling, CBE, philosopher.
- Adam Huckle, cricketer.
- Robert V. Jackson, politician, United Kingdom.
- Stuart W. Jamieson, FRCS, cardiothoracic surgeon.
- Gail Kelly, business person and banker (ex Staff).
- Charlie Knaggs, OBE, Colonel, British Army.
- Graham Lord, author, journalist and biographer.
- Tafadzwa Madondo, cricketer.
- Trevor Madondo, cricketer.
- TJ Maguranyanga, rugby player and American Football player.
- Patrick Mavros, artist and founder of PatrickMavros luxury brand.
- Matthew McNab, rugby player.
- Keegan Meth, cricketer
- Nhlanhlayamangwe Felix Ndiweni, Ndebele chief.
- Jordane Nicolle, cricketer.
- Mluleki Nkala, cricketer.
- Stephen Peall, cricketer.
- Nigel Pegram, actor.
- Greg Rasmussen, naturalist and survivor featured in Jaws of Death.
- Bryan Strang, cricketer.
- Paul Strang, cricketer.
- Heath Streak, cricketer.
- Andy Waller, cricketer.
- Brighton Watambwa, cricketer.
- David Webster, anthropologist and anti-apartheid activist
- Andy Whittall, cricketer.
- Guy Whittall, cricketer.
- Sean Williams, cricketer.
- Craig Wishart, cricketer.

== See also ==
- List of boarding schools
- List of schools in Zimbabwe
- Quiet Waters
