= Mzingwane High School =

Location
- Esigodini, Matabeleland South; Zimbabwe, Matabeleland South; Zimbabwe
- Coordinates: 20°20′38″S 28°56′38″E

Information
- Type: Government school
- Motto: Izenzo Kunge Mazwi "Actions speak louder than words" (Actions speak louder than words.)
- Opened: 21 March 1941
- School district: Umzingwane
- Authority: Umzingwane District
- Chairperson: Mandlenkosi Sinyoro. Chrislet Ncube
- Principal: Stanley Tizora
- Mascot: Elephant
- Newspaper: The Chronicle

Mzingwane High School used to be a boys-only government secondary school located in the heart of Esigodini, Matabeleland South. However, recent trends indicate a shift, with the school gradually incorporating female students to address declining enrollments, a pattern observed in other single-sex schools in the region. It was founded in 1921 in Tsholotsho then moved to Essexvale in 1942 (now Esigodini), 45 km southeast of Bulawayo.

== Mzingwane History ==
In 1940, due to a particularly virulent strain of cerebral malaria which, as the school grew in reputation with pupils coming from outside particularly what was Bechuanaland and Northern Rhodesia, and taking the strain home with them, it was decided to move the school to its present site.

However, this was during the second world war and there were few people with the skills to design a school in the country. Fortunately, a young British architect who was being trained in what was Gwelo, for the Royal Air Force, gave his time voluntarily to work with headmaster John Hammond in the design of the school. The school at that time was teaching skills such as building, leatherwork, carpentry, animal husbandry and agriculture as well as academic subjects. Overseen by the school teachers, in particular teacher Mathobi, Mavakatsha Dabengwa, Dembi Bulle, and Roger Malusalila, a class at a time would go to the new site - first to build a dormitory - then back to Tjolotjo for academic studies . . . next to new site to plant fruit trees . . . and back to Tjolotjo for academic studies ... next group to build a classroom etc. Joshua Nkomo was a carpentry tutor at that time and became involved in this big move.

The building of Mzingwane school took over two years and at last in 1942 the rest of the school was ready to go. This excerpt from the book Beloved African describes the 'great trek' for the final move from Tjolotjo to Mzingwane.

"One teacher and 52 boys herded almost half of all the four-footed animals at Tjolotjo, the 100 difficult miles across to Mzingwane. The preparations for it all were enormous. Even the local community got involved when they were commissioned to make dozens of plaited basket carriers for the chickens. These were tied onto the ox wagon and would give them all eggs en route. They had to work out, in conjunction with the staff, exactly which animals they could slaughter for food and which they could milk in the estimated four to five weeks it would take to trek that distance.

The ox wagons were loaded up with masses of educational necessities as well as building and carpentry needs. The boys were responsible for keeping the materials intact, for the planning of each day’s trek and for ensuring there was enough water and food, not only for the trek oxen, but also for all the herds of cattle, pigs and sheep as well. Herding pigs is a talent in itself! What a sight it was to see them leave at last – there was much farewelling and scampering along of the local piccanins who followed them until they crossed the Gwaai and were lost to sight.

John was doing for his boys what his father had done for Plumtree – giving them the responsibility to undertake huge tasks… but before they went, letting them know that he trusted them and had no doubts that they were quite capable of achieving it.

They did – and he was immensely proud of them - as they were of themselves. It was an enormous achievement. The excitement when they were first spotted as they turned into the long drive up to the new school was intense – Europeans and Africans lined the route to cheer and follow them all the way down that final lap home."

== Leadership ==
As of March 2022, the headmaster of Mzingwane High School is Stanley Tizora, who has been serving in this role under Zimbabwe's Ministry of Primary and Secondary Education.

Supporting the school's leadership, Herbert Ndlovu holds the position of Deputy Headmaster. His responsibilities include overseeing discipline, liaising with prefects, and participating in the School Finance Committee.

== Mzingwane today ==
Mzingwane High boards 400+ students. The School motto is Izenzo kunge Mazwi meaning Actions Speak Louder Than Words and the badge represents an Elephant. Obadiah Mlilo was Mzingwane's first black principal; he headed the school from 1973 to 1978. Mzingwane has a large alumni base both within the country and in the diaspora. Under the banner of Mzingwane Old Boys Association (MOBA), these alumni have helped in the development of the school. Their project title "replace your chair and desk" is one of MOBA's efforts to assist the school by purchasing new desks and chairs for students.

== Sports and clubs ==
In terms of extracurricular achievements, Mzingwane High School has excelled in sports and academics. Notably, the under-16 soccer team won the national Copa Coca-Cola tournament in 2012, and students have achieved commendable results in national mathematics competitions . Mzingwane High under 16 soccer team were champions of the 2012 under 16 national copa-coca-cola cup which was played at Chinotimba stadium in Victoria Falls. This made Mzingwane the first school from Matebeleland South province to win the title. They won US$6 500 and their coach Bekezela Mavundla won a coach of the year accolade. Their goal keeper, Paul Makotore was declared goal keeper of the tournament and voted Africa’s best goal keeper during a camp in South Africa. In 2015 Lwazilwenkosi Mpofu and McKringle Mhlanga were champions of the National Mathematics Olympiad by Old Mutual bringing Gold and Silver Medals home. Since 2015 till today the school have been the Defending Provincial Champions for the Aids Action Quiz (N.A.C.)

== Notable alumni ==
- Nkululeko Innocent Dube, founder of IYASA
- Mduduzi Mathuthu, editor of The Chronicle
- Jason Moyo, founder of the Zimbabwe People's Revolutionary Army
- Elijah Nkala, sprinter
- Lazarus Nkala, revolutionary and political activist

== See also ==
- List of schools in Zimbabwe
