= Ronnie Hill =

South African rugby union player

- Full name: Ronald Andrew Hill
- Born: 20 December 1934 Johannesburg, South Africa
- Died: 6 November 2011 (aged 76) Johannesburg, South Africa

Rugby union career
- Position: Hooker
International career
Years	Team	Apps	(Points)
1960–63	South Africa	7	(0)

Ronald Andrew Hill (20 December 1934 – 6 November 2011) was a South African international rugby union player.

Hill was born in Johannesburg but raised in Bulawayo from the age of three. He attended Technical High School.

A hooker, Hill played his rugby for Bulawayo-based club Old Miltonians and Rhodesia. He won Springboks selection on the 1960–61 tour of Europe as an understudy to Abie Malan, whose knee injury gave Hill a Test debut against Wales at Cardiff Arms Park, the first of seven Springboks caps.

Hill's daughter Debbie represented Zimbabwe in diving at the 1980 Olympic Games.

== See also ==
- List of South Africa national rugby union players
