= JZ Moyo High School =

J.Z. Moyo High School

Location
- West Nicholson; Matabeleland South, Zimbabwe; Zimbabwe
- Coordinates: 20.976507°S 29.3609790°E

Information
- Type: Public
- Motto: Education with Production
- Established: 1982
- School district: West Nicholson
- Grades: Form 1 – Form 6
- Colors: Blue shirts, Grey skirts and Trousers, Green and gold Blaizers
- Athletics: Soccer, volleyball, basketball, lacrosse

JZ Moyo High School (Jason Ziyaphapha Moyo High School), formerly Majoda School, is a co-educational government high school. It is located in the former Majoda Farm, approximately 12 km north of West Nicholson on the road to Filabusi and Mavako, in Matabeleland South province, Zimbabwe. JZ Moyo High is part of the ZIMFEP group of schools.

The school started in 1982 mainly as a school for refugees and former guerrillas. The founding headmaster is Paulos Matjaka Nare and the deputy headmaster was Mr. Sibanda. Paulos Matjaka Nare was a Parliamentary Candidate for MDC in the 2000 parliamentary elections poll, Gwanda South constituency, where he got 7,944 votes compared to Abednico Ncube of ZANU (PF) 9,913 and Mchasisi Nare (Ind) 674. After Nare's retirement the school remained headed by Mr Sibanda. Due to political instability his term of headship was terminated by political activists.

In February 2006 the school had problems feeding its students due to a grave shortage of mealie meal.

== Academics ==
All the students are boarders. Form four to upper six boys reside in a hostel called Sheraton whilst form one to three boys reside in old buildings usually called emabharakeni (the barracks). Girls reside in the eBhalagwe, whose name is taken from the area where the notorious Zimbabwean Fifth Brigade used to jail civilians during Gukurahundi. The students are classed according to their hostels, also called houses, and these are Inyathi, Ingwe, Isilwane and Impala.

From its inception in 1982 JZ Moyo High School has also been home to foreign students mainly from Botswana and South Africa. This has become less so however in recent years due to political instability in the country and deterioration of the public image of Zimbabwean Education. In 2009 the school was rated 17th top schools in the country.

== Cinema project ==
In 1995 a cinema project was launched by the sons of an expatriate couple, teaching at JZ. The brothers Daan and Wouter Dijkstra (at that time 14 and 15 years old) used a vacant school building to show a movie every Wednesday. The project became a success, offering entertainment and education to more than 120 children a week.

A wide screen TV and a video recorder were funded through Dutch development aid by NIZA (formerly known as KZA). To make the project durable Students would pay 1 Zim$ to watch the movie. After 2 years the two boys went back to Holland and donated the remaining money to the school.

== Religion ==
It is a Christian school. A Christian union was established in 1996 by Mr and Mrs Sebatha.
