= PatrickMavros =

African jewelry brand

- Company type: Private
- Industry: Jewelry, Luxury, Design
- Founded: In 1980
- Founder: Patrick Mavros
- Headquarters: London, United Kingdom and Harare, Zimbabwe
- Area served: World Wide
- Key people: Patrick, Catja, Alexander, Forbes, Patrick Jnr and Benjamin Mavros
- Products: Jewelry, Sculpture, Luxury home pieces
- Website: www.patrickmavros.com

PatrickMavros is an eponymous African luxury brand founded by Patrick Mavros.

== History ==
PatrickMavros was founded in 1980. Patrick, gifted his wife, Catja, with a pair of earrings that he had sculpted for her. The jewelry was noticed by her hairdresser who requested a similar pair, soon other ladies visiting the salon were asking for the earrings. This was the genesis of the business which today is regarded as the definitive luxury brand from Africa and whose followers span the globe.

The brand is operated by the Mavros couple's four sons; Alexander, Forbes, Patrick Jnr and Benjamin. The sons grew up spending all their spare time in the studio and workshop where they helped experiment with designing and material selection.

The Mavros’ family home is combined with their workshops and a wildlife sanctuary as well as a studio all located in the wild hills in the outskirts of Harare, Zimbabwe. The brands flagship store is in London and they have locations Nairobi, Kenya and an atelier and stores in Mauritius. The Mavros house and studio itself are noted in their own right for their architectural significance, location as well as their efforts to preserve wildlife. In 2016, the brand played a major role in bringing the plight of the pangolin to centre stage.

The brand has notably received in-depth coverage in Financial Times, Architectural Digest, Boat International, The Independent, and billionaire.com, among multiple other sources.
