= Jason Ziyaphapha Moyo Air Force Base =

Air base in Zimbabwe

Jason Ziyaphapha Moyo Air Force Base
- Chegutu, Mashonaland West Province in Zimbabwe

Site information
- Owner: Zimbabwe Defence Forces
- Operator: Air Force of Zimbabwe

Location
- Location within Zimbabwe
- Coordinates: 18°09′51″S 29°58′02″E

Site history
- Built: 1970
- Battles/wars: Rhodesian Bush War

Jason Ziyaphapha Moyo Air Force Base (abbreviated JZ Moyo), formerly known as Field Air Force Base and Fylde Air Force Base, is an air force base located near Dodington, approximately 18 kilometers west of Chegutu, Mashonaland West Province in Zimbabwe. It is one of the three main air bases for the Air Force of Zimbabwe home to air defence and regimental training. The base is also tasked with anti air artillery and radar systems training. A full range of amenities, which include workshops, transport fleets, equipment depots, accommodation, sporting and entertainment facilities support the base.

== History ==
Fylde Air Force Base was constructed in 1970 as a purpose-built strategic airfield, and was under operation of the Rhodesian Air Force (RhAF). Throughout its early operations, the base remained largely inactive. However, the escalation of the Rhodesian Bush War by the late 1970s led to multiple bombing operations held by the RhAF and South African Air Force (SAAF) into Mozambique and Angola. In February 1979, Fylde Air Base was used for Operation Luso Boma, hosting SAAF and Rhodesian No. 5 Squadron English Electric Canberras. During the operation, long-range bombing missions were launched into Angola, targeting ZIPRA and ANC training camps. During Operation Unic in September 1979, Fylde Air Base was used as a forward staging base for inland raids into Mozambique. It was again used during Operation Miracle in the same year, functioning as a temporary forwarding base for external striking missions. Throughout the late 1970s, it operated as a base for SAAF Canberras, and Hawker Hunters also commonly flew from the base.

=== Post-independence and AFZ usage ===
Following the independence of Zimbabwe in 1980, Fylde Air Base was under control of the Air Force of Zimbabwe (AFZ). Under the 1983 Names (Altercation) Act, Fylde AFB was renamed to Field Air Force Base, which was enacted on 6 May 1983. Construction for taxiway on the southeastern end of the runway began in 1989. Two dispersal sites with revetments were also established on the northwestern and southeastern ends. Earthworks also appeared for a parallel taxiway on the other side of the runway, however, construction for it and the southeastern dispersal site did not continue beyond that stage. The taxiway was opened in 1991–92. Infrastructure included a control tower, aircraft shelters and revetments, and underground fuel storage facilities. It was formerly home to the School of Military Training, which later moved to Buffalo Range Airport in Chiredzi. As of 2004, it housed Air Defence personnel and equipment.

Under Statutory Instrument 138 of 2017, Field Air Force Base was renamed to Jason Ziyaphapha Moyo Air Force Base in honour of Jason Ziyaphapha Moyo, who was a founding member of the Zimbabwe African People's Union and Chief of Operations of the Zimbabwe People's Revolutionary Army. President Emmerson Mnangagwa addressed the changing of the base name on 1 June 2018. As of 2024, JZ Moyo Air Base hosts the 44th Recruit Course and 17th Senior Tactics Course. These training courses simulated combat pressures for its recruits, ensuring that personnel would be ready to transition quickly to wartime operations from peace. The base also drew recruits from remote communities, acting as an opportunities for youth development, according to AFZ Air Marshal Elson Moyo. On 4 February 2025, Air Commodore Ellen Chiweshe became the base's first female base commander and second since independence, taking over from Air Commodore Nicholas Nyati. The event was officiated by Air Marshal John Jacob Nzvede.
