= Charlie Knaggs =

OBE Charlie Knaggs
- Birth name: Charles Peter Huntley Knaggs
- Allegiance: United Kingdom
- Service / branch: British Army
- Rank: Colonel
- Commands: 1st Battalion, Irish Guards
- Battles / wars: War in Afghanistan

Charles Peter Huntley Knaggs OBE, is a colonel in the British Army.

== Biography ==
As commander of the First Battalion, Irish Guards, he was Field Officer in Waiting during the Trooping the Colour ceremony in 2005. He was deployed with his battalion to Helmand Province, Afghanistan, shortly thereafter as part of the NATO force providing security.

He was awarded the Order of the British Empire in the 2006 Birthday Honours.

He became the Clerk to the Worshipful Company of Ironmongers in July 2018.
