= Bulawayo Technical School =

Location
- Bulawayo; Zimbabwe

Information
- Established: 1927; 98 years ago

The Bulawayo Technical School was established in Bulawayo, Zimbabwe in January 1927 and was the first technical school in what was then Southern Rhodesia. The school had been planned to educate boys with technical ability who could contribute practical skills to the young and rapidly developing country.

Its founder headmaster was Mr. P.H. Gifford, a science graduate from the University of Manchester, who had previously served at Boys' High School in what was then Salisbury. He was to remain with the school for twenty years and was succeeded as headmaster by Mr. H. J. Sutherby in 1947, who had also been a founder member of staff.

The school was renamed Gifford Technical High School, in honour of its founding headmaster, on 19 August 1961. The school was renamed Gifford High School in 1974 when it became a comprehensive high school offering the same range of subjects as other high schools in the country.

== Notable alumni ==
- David Candler (1924–2008), cricketer, clergyman and educator
