= West Nicholson =

Zimbabwean town

West Nicholson Tshabezi
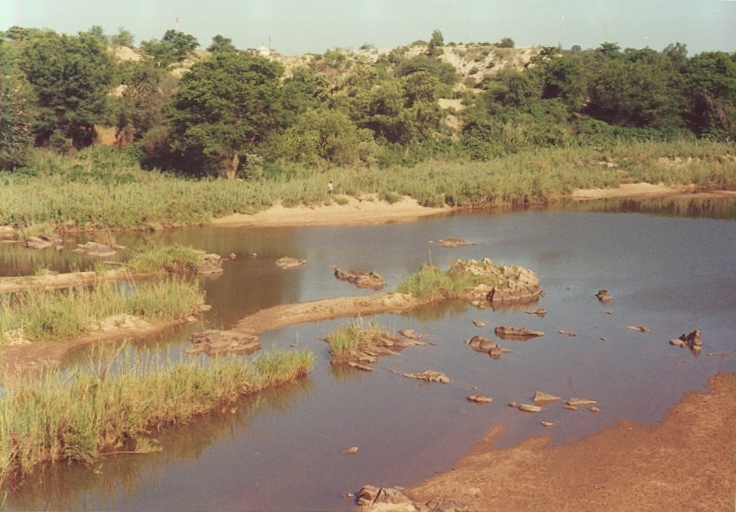
- Mzingwane River at West Nicholson

- Location in Zimbabwe
- Coordinates: 21°03′52″S 29°21′54″E
- Country: Zimbabwe
- Province: Matabeleland South
- Districts of Zimbabwe: Gwanda District
- Municipality: West Nicholson Town Council
- Elevation: 820 m (2,690 ft)

Population (1982 Census)
  - Total: 1,633
- Time zone: UTC+2 (CAT)
- Climate: Cwa

West Nicholson or Tshabezi is a town in the Matabeleland South Province of Zimbabwe.

== Location ==
It is located in Gwanda District, along the Bulawayo–Beitbridge Highway, approximately 44 kilometres (27 mi), southeast of the town of Gwanda, where the district headquarters are located. This is approximately 171 kilometres (106 mi), by road, southeast of Bulawayo, the nearest large city. West Nicholson is approximately 150.5 kilometres (94 mi), by road, northwest of the town of Beitbridge, at the international border with South Africa. The geographical coordinates of the town are: 21°03'52.0"S, 29°21'54.0"E (Latitude:-21.064444; Longitude:29.365000). West Nicholson sits at an average elevation of 820 metres (2,690 ft) above mean sea level.

== Overview ==
West Nicholson is named after Andy Nicholson, an early prospector who entered the country with the Pioneer Column and was responsible for mining exploration in the area.

The town hosted a large beef factory, that turned the local cattle into corned beef and biltong, but this is now closed. There is a supermarket and butchery run by Rogers Brothers and Sons. Game and Safari activities are available at Tshabezi Safaris, Tamba, Sondelani and Tod's Guest House. Once a major gold mining area, the country around West Nicholson is riddled with small workings, the only major mining activity still occurs about four kilometers along the main road towards Bulawayo. The mine is called Jessie Mine owned by F.A. Stewart Private Limited.

The Mzingwane River runs through the town and a railway runs past it, carrying passengers and cargo.

== Population ==
According to the 1982 population census, West Nicholson had a population of 1,633.

== Sports ==
Sporting activities are mainly based on soccer, having two teams namely, Mazambane United, Jessie Mine Football Club and West Nicholson United playing in the Zimbabwe Football Association's lower division leagues. Other sporting activities include netball and volleyball with Jessie Mine and JZ Moyo High School taking part in the Matabeleland South Volleyball Association's leagues.

== Education ==
The local primary school, West Nicholson Primary School, is located close to downtown and is run by the Lutheran Church. JZ Moyo High School (Jason Ziyaphapha Moyo High School), is a government high school, for both girls and boys, that was established in 1982. It is located in the former Majoda Farm, approximately 14 kilometres (9 mi), north of West Nicholson on the road to Filabusi. JZ Moyo High School is part of the ZIMFEP group of schools.
