= Lodumo Nkala =

South African Entrepreneur

- Born: 18 March 2003 (age 23); Johannesburg, Gauteng, South Africa
- Awards: Mail & Guardian Top 200 Young South African (2022)

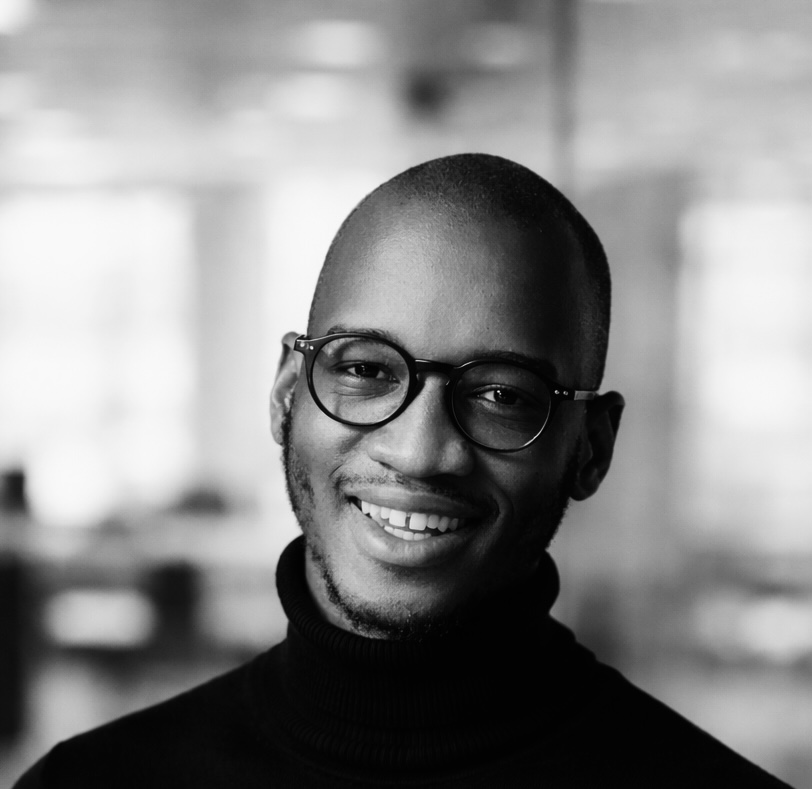

Lodumo Nkala is a South African businessman and avid racing pigeon breeder. He was listed among the Mail and Guardian Top 200 Young South Africans for the year 2022.

== Biography ==
In 2020, Nkala founded Community Lofts, an Organization introducing the sport of Pigeon Racing in the South African Townships. His love and passion for Pigeons arouse In 2010, while growing up at his grandparents house in Rustenburg, after his neighbour owned a flock of nearly 300 Racing Homer Pigeons. Since then, Community Lofts has become an impactful organization operating in various Townships and Rural Areas of South Africa.

== Recognition ==
Nkala has been listed amongst the News24 100 Young Mandelas for the year 2023. Notably, he has also been featured on the Daily Maverick, and the Independent Online
