= Colleen Bawn =

Zimbabwean town

- Town
- Location in Zimbabwe
- Coordinates: 21°00′00″S 29°12′36″E
- Country: Zimbabwe
- Province: Matabeleland South
- Districts of Zimbabwe: Gwanda District
- Municipality: Colleen Bawn Town Council
- Elevation: 3,133 ft (955 m)

Population (2020 Estimate)
  - Total: 2,492
- Time zone: UTC+2 (CAT)
- Climate: Cwa

Colleen Bawn is a town in Zimbabwe.

== Location ==
Colleen Bawn is located in Gwanda District, in Matabeleland South Province, in southwest Zimbabwe. It is approximately 59 kilometres (37 mi), by road, east of Gwanda, the provincial and district headquarters. This is about 191 kilometres (119 mi), by road, southeast of Bulawayo, the nearest large city.

This location lies on Highway A-6, the main road between Bulawayo and Beitbridge, at the international border with the Republic of South Africa. The coordinates of the town are:21° 0' 0.00"S, 29° 12' 36.00"E (Latitude:21.0000; Longitude:29.2100). Colleen Bawn lies at an average elevation of 955 metres (3,133 ft), above mean sea level.

== Overview ==
Colleen Bawn is supplied with water from Geelong Weir on the Mzingwane River, fed by releases of water from Silalabuhwa Dam, on the tributary Insiza River. The town grew up around the Colleen Bawn gold mine. The prospector who pegged claim to the mine in 1895, named it after an Irish girl with whom he had been acquainted. The mine was opened in 1905 but after the Second World War, limestone became the focal mineral in the area. The limestone is mined by Pretoria Portland Cement, who operate a cement factory on the site and have been responsible for recent growth in the town.

== Population ==
According to the 1982 Population Census, Colleen Bawn had a population of 1,427. In 2004, the population of the town was estimated at 2,545. As of 2020, the population of the town was estimated at 2,492 inhabitants.

== Economy ==
The Pretoria Portland Cement company, is planning to construct a 32 megawatts solar power plant at the location of its cement manufacturing factory in Colleen Bawn. 16 megawatts of the output of Colleen Bawn Solar Power Station will be consumed by the cement factory, and the remainder will be sold to the Zimbabwean national electricity grid.
