= Jason Moyo =

Zimbabwe revolutionary (1927–1977)

Jason Ziyaphapha Moyo (1927–1977) was the founder of the Zimbabwe People's Revolutionary Army (ZIPRA).

Moyo was born in Plumtree to a Kalanga family. Having trained as a builder, he became interested in trade unionism in Bulawayo in the early 1950s and became general secretary of the African Artisans' Union. He joined the Bulawayo branch of the African National Congress (ANC) and became successively its secretary and its chairman.

JZ Moyo High School and Jason Ziyaphapha Moyo Air Force Base were named after him, as well as Jason Moyo Avenue, a major road in Harare.

== Death ==
Moyo was killed on 22 January 1977 by a parcel bomb which he handled at the Lusaka offices of the ANC. The parcel appeared to have been sent by a woman known to Moyo, living in Botswana. However, in an enquiry sponsored by Joshua Nkomo and carried out by Gibson Mayisa, she was cleared as the parcel had not come from there.
