= Fort Rixon =

Coordinates: 20°01′S 29°16′E

Fort Rixon is a village and farming centre in Matabeleland region of southwestern Zimbabwe. It is located some 48 miles (77 km) north-east of Bulawayo. It was founded as a military outpost in 1896 during the rebellion of the Matabele against British colonial rule of Rhodesia. Nowadays it has a Zulu lithium mine.
