= Filabusi =

Zimbabwean town

Filabusi Emfelabuso
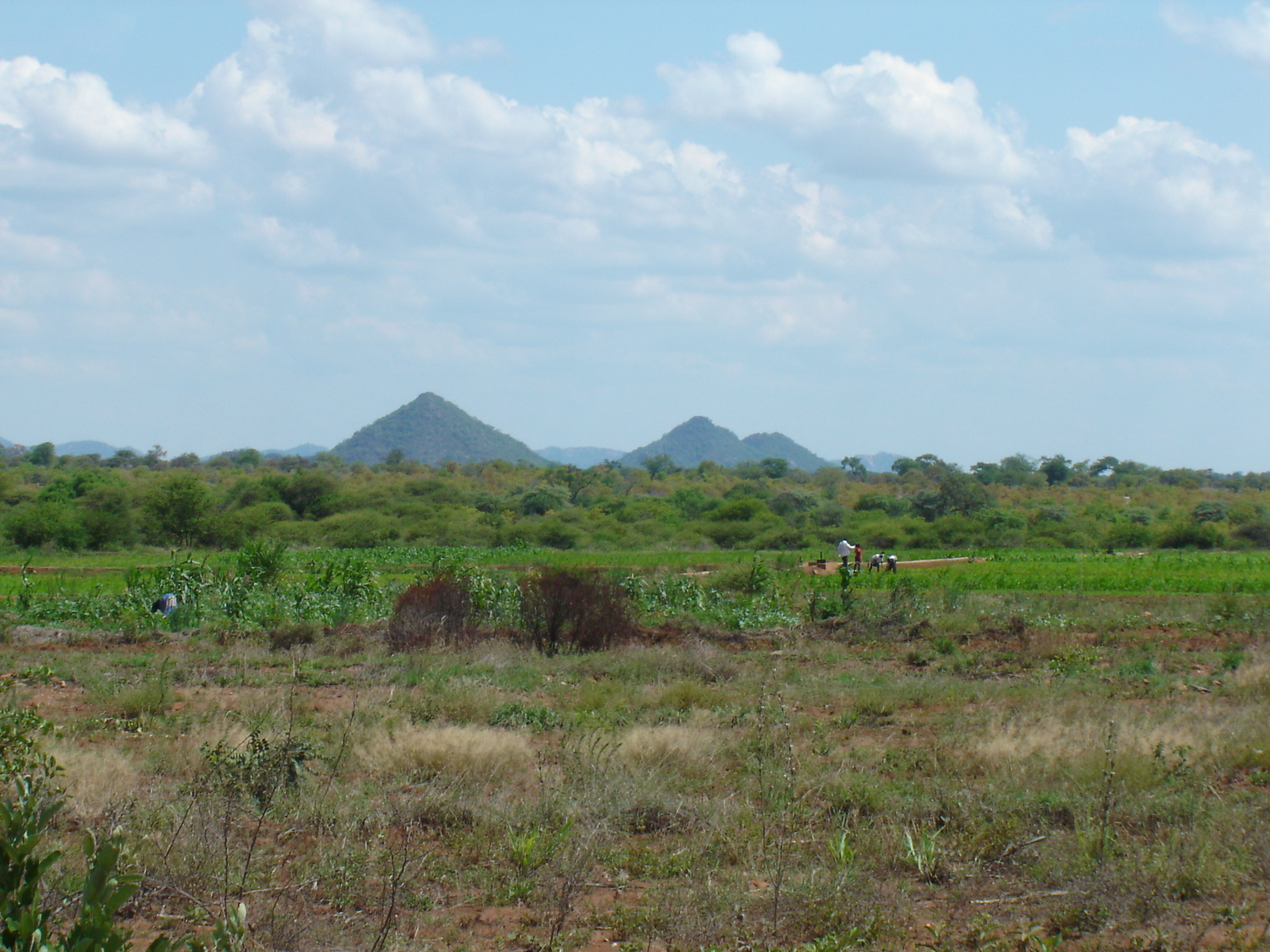
- Farming area near Filabusi

- Location in Zimbabwe
- Coordinates: 20°31′46″S 29°17′12″E
- Country: Zimbabwe
- Province: Matabeleland South
- Districts of Zimbabwe: Insiza District
- Municipality: Filabusi Town Council
- Elevation: 3,566 ft (1,087 m)

Population (2012 Census)
  - Total: 1,756
- Time zone: UTC+2 (CAT)
- Climate: BSh

Filabusi is a town in the Matabeleland South Province of Zimbabwe. The town is the administrative capital of Insiza District and a service centre for the surrounding mining and farming areas.

== Location ==
Filabusi lies off the Mbalabala–Mutare Road, approximately 98 kilometres (61 mi), southeast of Bulawayo, the nearest large city. This is approximately 91 kilometres (57 mi), by road, west of Zvishavane, in Zvishavane District. The geographical coordinates of Filabusi are 20°31'46.0"S, 29°17'12.0"E (Latitude:-20.529444; Longitude:29.286667). The town sits at an average elevation of 1,087 metres (3,566 ft) above mean sea level.

== Overview ==
The town of Filabusi is supplied with water from a weir on the Insiza River. The Filabusi Mining District was a major producer of gold, with mines such as Fred and Royal Family. Nickel was mined at Epoch Mines, owned by Bindura Nickel Corporation. Asbestos was also mined at Pangani and Croft. However all these large scale mining operations are now closed, with mining in the district limited to small scale artisanal gold mining.

== Population ==
The 2012 national population census put the population of Filabusi at 1,756 inhabitants.

== Agriculture ==
Agriculture in the Filabusi area is mostly cattle ranching, with some small-scale farming (see photo), the latter mainly on land expropriated from Caucasian settlers, as part of the Fast Track Land Reform Programme (FTLRP).

== Other considerations ==
The town hosts a hospital; the Filabusi District Hospital and a high school, the Filabusi High School. There are two private surgeries and a retail pharmacy. Filabusi is also home to Godlwayo Culture Centre, which hosted the 2016 Annual Zimbabwe Culture Week.

== See also ==
- List of cities and towns in Zimbabwe
