= Insiza District =

Insiza
- District
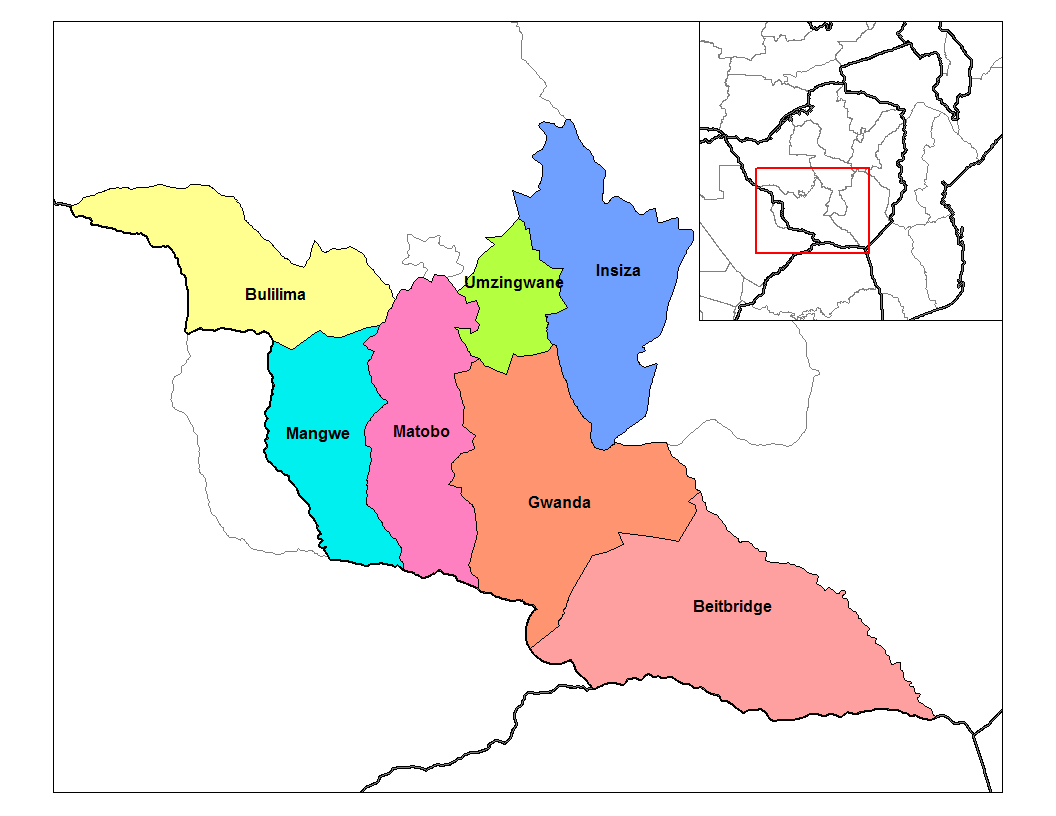
- Location of Insiza within Matabeleland South
- Coordinates: 20°19′54″S 29°14′29″E
- Country: Zimbabwe
- Province: Matabeleland South

Area
  - Total: 8,221 km^{2} (3,174 sq mi)

Population (2022 census)
  - Total: 122,903

Insiza District is one of the seven districts located in the Matabeleland South province of Zimbabwe. It is a rural area. Insiza District lies to the South East of Bulawayo and borders Gwanda District to the South, Zvishavane District to the east, and Umzingwane District to the West. The total distance between Insiza and Bulawayo is 77 km and 469 km from Harare. The district is mostly in natural region four. This region experiences fairly low total rainfall (450–650 mm) and is subject to periodic seasonal droughts and severe dry spells during the rainy season. The rainfall is too low and uneven for cash cropping except in certain very favourable localities, where limited drought resistant crops can afford a side-line. The farming system, in accord with natural factors, should be based on livestock production, but it: can be intensified to some extent by the growing of drought resistant fodder crops.

Insiza constituency has a total population of 86 307 people and Ndebele is the most commonly spoken language. There are 78 primary schools, 18 secondary schools. Insiza district is home to 14 health centres, 72 business centres, 45 dip tanks, 314 boreholes and 7 dams. The constituency has 18 rural council seats allocated by ward. There are also 42 income generating projects, which received funding from the then Ministry of Youth, Gender and Employment Creation. Gold panning takes place throughout the year and peaks in August and September. A number of small scale mines in the district provide employment.

More than 1000 votes have been unaccounted for at the 2005 general election. It has been won by the ZANU–PF candidate Andrew Langa at the 2005 general election. Insiza has been held by the ZANU–PF since the 2002 by-election.
