= Esigodini =

Zimbabwean town

Esigodini Essexvale
- Town
- Coat of arms

- Location within Zimbabwe
- Coordinates: 20°17′33″S 28°56′17″E
- Country: Zimbabwe
- Province: Matabeleland South
- District: Umzingwane
- Elevation: 1,182 m (3,878 ft)

Population (2012 Census)
  - Total: 2,228
- Time zone: UTC+2 (CAT)

Esigodini, formerly known as Essexvale, is a town in the Matabeleland South Province of Zimbabwe. It is the administrative centre for Umzingwane District, one of the seven administrative districts in Matabeleland South. It was originally an estate of Frederick Selous, a British explorer, officer, professional hunter, and conservationist.

== Location ==
Esigodini is situated approximately 44.5 kilometres (28 mi), by Gwanda road, southeast of Bulawayo, the nearest large city and largest urban centre in the province. The town sits along the Bulawayo–Beitbridge Road, approximately 82.5 kilometres (51 mi) northwest of the town of Gwanda. The geographical coordinates of the town are:20°17'33.0"S, 28°56'17.0"E (Latitude:-20.292500; Longitude:28.938056). Esigodini is located at an average elevation of 1,182 metres (3,878 ft), above mean sea level.

== Overview ==
Esigodini is the district capital of Umzingwane Rural District Council, which is responsible for running the affairs of the district as a whole. The trading centre is surrounded by ranches and mixed farms. The surrounding communities also host gold, dams and tungsten mines. The area has many rivers, although it suffers from long dry season and drought is common in this area. Average annual rainfall is approximately 30 inches (762 mm).

== Population ==
According to the 1982 population census, Esigodini had a population of 1,492. The 2012 national population census and household survey enumerated 2,228 inhabitants in the town.

== History ==
The town was officially known as Essexvale until 1982, when the name changed to Esigodini. It was founded in 1894. Prior to the coming of European settlers, the surrounding area was settled by Rozi Moyo people, who had moved here from the area near Gwanda.

== Schools ==
Nearby schools include Falcon College, a renowned secondary school for boys and Mzingwane High School, Mvuthu High School, Esikhoveni Secondary, Mawabeni Secondary, Longfied Secondary, and Mlomotsha while primary schools are Bayethe, Bezha, Bonjeni, Carlisle, Dobi, Doyana, Dula, Esigodini, Glen Grey, Godlwayo Annex, How Mine, Impu, Inyankuni, Irisvale, Isotsha, Kumbudzi, Longfield, Malungwane, Nsezi, Shale, Bezha, Zhilo, Swazi, Matshetshe, Mawabeni, Mbalabala, Mbizingwe, Mzinyathini, Mlomoliwoto, Mpisini, Mpofini, Mtshede, Munkula, Mvuthu. Also nearby, is the Roman Catholic mission school known as Sacred Heart Girls School, a boarding secondary school. This school was founded in 2014 and is run by the Sisters Of The Precious Blood who fall under the Roman Catholic Archdiocese of Bulawayo, and came mainly from Germany shortly after the Second World War.

== See also ==
- Northern Ndebele people
