= List of schools in Zimbabwe =

This is a list of notable schools in the African country of Zimbabwe. Zimbabwe's tertiary institutions are listed on a separate list at List of universities in Zimbabwe.

Schools are listed alphabetically by Zimbabwean province.

== Bulawayo Province ==
- Christian Brothers College, Matsheumhlope
- Dominican Convent High School, Bulawayo
- Dominican Convent Primary School, Bulawayo
- Founders High School, Bulawayo
- Gifford High School, Bulawayo
- Girls' College, Bulawayo
- Hamilton High School, Bulawayo
- Luveve Secondary School, Bulawayo
- Milton High School, Bulawayo
- Mpopoma High School, Bulawayo
- Mzilikazi High School, Bulawayo
- Petra High School, Bulawayo
- Rhodes Estate Preparatory School, Matopos
- Sizane Secondary School, Pelandaba
- St. Augustine's College, Sunnyside
- St. Bernard's High School, Pumula
- St. Thomas Aquinas Primary School, Khumalo
- Whitestone School, Burnside

== Harare Province ==
- Alfred Beit School, Mabelreign
- Allan Wilson High School
- Arundel School, Mount Pleasant
- Chisipite Junior School, Chisipite
- Chisipite Senior School, Chisipite
- Churchill School, Eastlea
- Cranborne Boys High School, Cranborne
- Dominican Convent High School
- Eaglesvale Senior School, Willowvale
- Ellis Robins School, Mabelreign
- Emerald Hill School, Emerald Hill – school for the deaf
- Gateway High School, Emerald Hill
- Girls High School
- Glen View 1 High School, Glen View
- Groupe Scolaire Jean de La Fontaine, Vainona
- Harare International School, Mount Pleasant
- Hartmann House Preparatory School, Borrowdale
- Hellenic Academy, New Alexandra Park
- His Mercy Christian College, Borrowdale
- Mabvuku High School, Mabvuku
- Marlborough High School, Marlborough
- Mazowe Boys High School
- Morgan High School
- Mount Pleasant School, Mount Pleasant
- Mufakose Number 2 High School, Mufakose
- Nyatsime College
- Oriel Boys' High School, Chisipite
- Prince Edward School
- St Dominic's Chishawasha, Chishawasha
- St. George's College
- St. John's College, Borrowdale
- St. John's High School, Emerald Hill
- St. John's Preparatory School, Borrowdale
- St. Peter's Kubatana, Glen Norah
- Vainona High School, Vainona
- Visitation-Makumbi High School
- Westridge High School, Belvedere
- Zengeza 1 High School, Chitungwiza
- ZRP High School, Borrowdale

== Manicaland Province ==
- Chitakatira High School, near Mutare
- Hillcrest College, Mutare
- Nyanga High School, Marist Brothers, Nyanga District
- Sakubva High School, Sakubva
- St. Faith's School, Rusape
- St Killian's Mission, Rusape

== Mashonaland Central Province ==
- Lady Enereta High School, Bindura
- Howard High School, Glendale
- Mazowe Boys High School
- Saint Alberts High School, Centenary

== Mashonaland East Province ==
- Bernard Mizeki College, Marondera
- Christ the King Daramombe
- Goromonzi High School, Goromonzi
- Gumbonzvanda High School, Wedza District
- Kwenda Mission High School, Chikomba District
- Marondera High School, Marondera
- Monte Cassino Girls High School
- Peterhouse Boys' School
- Peterhouse Girls' School
- Ruzawi School, Marondera
- Springvale House
- St Dominic's Chishawasha, Chishawasha
- Saint Ignatius College, Chishawasha
- St. Paul's High School, Murewa
- Waddilove High School, Marondera
- Watershed College, near Marondera

== Mashonaland West Province ==
- Bryden Country School
- Chinhoyi High School, Chinhoyi
- Cornway College, Mount Hampden
- Jameson High School, Kadoma
- Kutama College, Norton
- Lilfordia School
- Lomagundi College, Chinhoyi
- Moleli High School, Chegutu District
- New Hope Christian College
- Sandringham High School, near Norton

== Masvingo Province ==
- Dewure High School, Gutu District
- Gokomere High School
- Kyle College, Masvingo
- Rufaro High School, Gutu District
- Victoria High School, Rhodene
- Zimuto High School

== Matabeleland North Province ==
- Inyathi High School, Inyathi
- Marist Brothers Secondary School, Dete
- Tsholotsho High School, Tsholotsho

== Matabeleland South Province ==
- Falcon College, Esigodini
- JZ Moyo High School, near West Nicholson
- Manama High School, Manama
- Mzingwane High School, Esigodini
- Plumtree School, Plumtree
- Singwango Secondary School, Filabusi

== Midlands Province ==
- Chaplin High School, Gweru
- Chegato High School
- Fletcher High School, Gweru
- Goldridge College, Kwekwe
- Hanke Adventist High School, Shurugwi
- Kwekwe High School , Kwekwe
- Lingfield Christian Academy, Gweru
- Midlands Christian College, Gweru
- Pakame Mission, Shurugwi
- Rio Tinto Zhombe High School, Kwekwe District
- Sidakeni Secondary School, Sidakeni
- Thornhill High School, Gweru
- Tongogara High School, Shurugwi
- Totororo Secondary School, Empress Mine

== See also ==
- Association of Trust Schools
- Education in Zimbabwe
