= List of secondary schools in Harare Province =

This is a list of secondary schools in Harare Province in Zimbabwe. Harare Province is made up of three municipalities: Harare, the national capital, Chitungwiza, and Epworth.

== Harare ==
=== Private schools ===
- Arundel School
- Avenues High School
- Bishopslea Preparatory School
- Chisipite Senior School
- Cornway College
- Direct Contact School
- Dominican Convent High School
- Eaglesvale High School
- École Française de Harare
- Emerald Hill School for the Deaf
- Frestar Academy
- Futures Academy High School
- Firm Foundation Christian Academy
- Forward in Faith Christian School
- Gateway High School
- George Emmanuel College
- Goldridge College
- Harare International School
- Hellenic Academy
- His Mercy Christian College
- The Heritage School
- Hilbright Science College
- Life Long College
- Malta Academy
- Maranatha Christian High School
- Mazowe Boys High School
- Megham International College
- Noteview College
- Phoenix College
- Pinewood High School
- Royal College
- Speciss College
- St. Christopher's School
- St. John's College
- St. John's High School
- St. George's College
- St. Peter's Kubatana High School
- Trust Academy High School
- Tynwald High School
- UUMA Elite College
- Washington Hills High School
- Westridge High School
- Winwood College
- Ultimate College of Technology

=== Public schools ===
- Allan Wilson Technical High School
- Budiriro 1 High School
- Budiriro 2 High School
- Churchill School
- Cranborne Boys High School
- Dzivaresekwa 1 High School
- Dzivaresekwa 2 High School
- Ellis Robins School
- George Stark High School
- Girls High School
- Glen Norah 1 High School
- Glen Norah 2 High School
- Glen View 1 High School
- Glen View 2 High School
- Glen View 3 High School
- Harare High School
- Hatcliffe High School
- Hatfield Girls High School
- Highfield 1 High School
- Highfield 2 High School
- Kambuzuma 1 High School
- Kambuzuma 2 High School
- Kuwadzana 1 High School
- Kuwadzana 2 High School
- Kwayedza High School
- Lord Malvern High School
- Mabelreign Girls High School
- Mabvuku High School
- Marlborough High School
- Mbare High School
- Morgan High School
- Mount Pleasant School
- Mufakose Mhuriimwe High School
- Mufakose 1 High School
- Mufakose 2 High School
- Mufakose 3 High School
- Mufakose 4 High School
- Mukai High School
- Oriel Boys High School
- Oriel Girls High School
- Prince Edward School
- Queen Elizabeth Girls High School
- Roosevelt Girls High School
- Tafara 1 High School
- Tafara 2 High School
- Vainona High School
- Warren Park High School
- Zimbabwe–China Friendship High School
- Zimbabwe Republic Police High School

== Masumbukeras school ==
=== Private schools ===
- Cornerstone Senior School
- Herentals College
- Nyatsime College
- St. Mary's High School

=== Public schools ===
- Manyame Secondary School
- Mhuri Imwe Secondary School
- Ridgeview High School
- Seke 1 High School
- Seke 2 High School
- Seke 3 High School
- Seke 4 High School
- Seke 5 High School
- Seke 6 High School
- Zengeza High School
- Zengeza 1 High School
- Zengeza 2 High School
- Zengeza 3 High School
- Zengeza 4 High School

== Epworth ==
=== Public schools ===
- Domboramwari High School
- Epworth High School
