= List of secondary schools in Bulawayo =

This is a list of secondary schools in Bulawayo, a city and province in western Zimbabwe.

== Private schools ==
The following are church-operated or independent schools:

- Bulawayo Adventist High School
- Great Hills Heritage High School
- Christian Brothers College
- Dominican Convent High School
- Girls' College
- Green Gables High School
- Maranatha Adventist High School
- Masiyephambili College
- Petra High School
- Premier High School
- Prestige High School
- Sizane Secondary School
- Solusi Adventist High School
- St. Bernard's High School
- St. Columba's High School
- Eastview High School
- Liberty Christian College
- Riverdale Academy
- St. Augustine's College Bulawayo

== Private Schools- Primary ==
Some of these schools are preparatory schools for high schools. The following list contains stand alone private schools that are only primary schools.

- St. Thomas
- Carmel
- Centenary School
- Dominican Convent Primary School
- Riverdale Academy
- Wonderpark Elementary School
- Angels Primary School
- Once upon a Child Primary School
- Eden Heritage Primary School

== Public schools ==
- Amhlophe High School
- Cowdray Park Secondary School
- Emakhandeni High School
- Emganwini Secondary School
- Entumbane High School
- Eveline High School
- Founders High School
- Gifford High School
- Hamilton High School
- Ihlati Secondary School
- Induna High School
- Inyanda High School
- Lobengula High School
- Luveve Secondary School
- Magwegwe High School
- Mandwandwe High School
- Masotsha High School
- Milton High School
- Mncumbatha Secondary School
- Montrose Girls' High School
- Mpopoma High School
- Msiteli High School
- Mzilikazi High School
- Njube High School
- Nketa High School
- Nkulumane Secondary School
- Northlea High School
- Pumula High School
- Pumula South Secondary School
- Sikhulile High School
- Sobukazi High School
- Townsend High School

== Former schools ==
- Elite High School (operated 1999–2009)
- St. George's College (opened in Bulawayo in 1896; relocated to Salisbury in 1926)
- St. Peter's Diocesan School (operated 1911–1977)
