= Saint Alberts High School =

Saint Alberts High School - Centenary, Zimbabwe

Location
- Centenary, Mashonaland Central; Zimbabwe; 16°29′S 31°17′E

Information
- Denomination: Roman Catholic
- Founded: 1970s
- Authority: Diocese of Chinhoyi
- Head of school: Fr. Vitalis Murombedzi
- Gender: Mixed
- Age range: 12 to 19 subject to how early or late a student will have started school
- Average class size: 36
- Houses: Saint Martins, Saint Augustine, Miguel, Silveria
- Colour: Maroon

Saint Alberts High School is a coeducational Roman Catholic Church mission high school that also provides boarding for students. It is situated in the Mashonaland Central province of Zimbabwe, on the escarpment overlooking the Zambezi Valley in northern Zimbabwe near the Mozambique border. It is above this escarpment which is also popularly known as the Mavhuradonha Mountain range. The Valley below is also known as Dande. St. Alberts, which is located in a pristine area between Mt Darwin and Centenary, in a region of temperate weather.

== History ==
The school was founded in the 1970s by the Jesuit society of the Roman Catholic Church. In July 1973, Zimbabwe African National Liberation Army (ZANLA) cadres captured 292 pupils and staff from the school and force-marched them north towards Mozambique, where the ZANLA bases were. The march was intercepted by the Rhodesian Security Forces before it crossed the border and all but eight of the children and staff were recovered. The school was closed in the late 1970s at the height of the Rhodesian Bush War.

In 1981, the school was reopened with around 120 students in Form One. Its first headmaster after Zimbabwe's Independence was Celestine Mtandadzi (died 28 July 2007). His deputy was Cannan Chabayanzara (died 2003). Initially, the school had a total of four teachers. By 1984, it had forms one to four. The school added buildings to accommodate the increased class size.

St Alberts had teachers whose appreciation of drama and theatre led the school to build theatres not only for the students, but also for the surrounding communities. Among these teachers was George Mujajati, who went on to write novels and plays like "Victory" and "The Wretched One". St Alberts won several drama trophies under its teacher and chief drama master Gonzo Habbakuk Msengezi. He became the first writer in Zimbabwe to be pursued by the Secret Police after writing books like "Zvairwadza Vasara" and "The Honourable MP".

St Alberts opened its doors to A-level students in 1987. It started with only arts students, as the school was still in the process of building science laboratories.

The school was involved in agriculture projects, as it had a large student garden. It also kept cattle, pigs and goats. However, with the arrival of Roman Catholic Father Superior, Father Von Walter, the agriculture projects were ended and the gardens were closed. This was the result of conflicts between Father Von Walter and the headmaster Mtandadzi. Mtandadzi left the school in 1990, becoming an Education Officer. Other Headmasters of the school include Chidavaenzi and Donato.

== Houses ==
St Alberts has four competing students' houses:

- Silveira, which wears yellow.
- Miguel, which wears red.
- St Augustine, which wears green.
- St Martins, which wears white.

It has three academic classes which go under the names of Zimbabwe's most notable historical persons Nehanda, Kaguvi and Munhumutapa.

== Athletic achievements ==
St Alberts volleyball first qualified for the National Volleyball Finals in 1998. In the 2000 Nyanga Volleyball Finals they advanced to the quarter-finals where they lost to eventual winners Mufakose Number 2 High School after a 3 set match which they lost 2–1.

The school has multiple recreational facilities, including a swimming pool, a football field, and Olympic standard volleyball and netball grounds.

== Debate and Public Speaking ==
During the years 2006 to 2008 the school won or placed highly in various debate and public speaking competitions. Under the guidance of Mr. Freeman Mondo the Public Speaking team won the provincial public speaking competition at junior level in 2006. The same coach led the debate team in the national senior debate competition. The team won the provincial level of the competition beating Mazowe Boys High. The team proceeded to the National Competition hosted by Prince Edward School where they made it to the final against Marist Brothers Kutama College. The team lost out on a points decision after they had points deducted for fielding form 3 and 4 students in a competition meant exclusively for form 5 and 6 students.

In the 2007 edition of the Nugget Debate Competition the team achieved a clean sweep of all the prizes in the junior category, winning the title in the competition hosted by Midlands Christian College. The team captain was voted the best overall speaker at the competition.

In 2008 the team again competed at the provincial level of the debate and public speaking competitions. In the final of the Public Speaking Competition St Alberts lost out to Mazowe Boys High School who later on went to win the competition at national level. Saint Alberts won the female provincial competition and qualified to represent the province at the national level. However, for financial reasons, was unable to attend the national competition. The debate team defeated the Mazowe Boys High at the provincial finals held at Bradley High School. Due to funding problems, the team was again unable to attend the national competition at Marist Brothers, Nyanga.

After a brief hiatus from national competitions, another team was assembled by Mr Zhou in 2010. The team lost in the Provincial final to Langham Girls. In 2011, the senior team dominated the Provincial finals and qualified for the Nugget National competitions. The team reached the quarter-finals of the national competitions, with the team captain voted among the best speakers at the finals
