= Taal-Net Group of Schools =

School group in South Africa and Zimbabwe

- Zimbabwe, South Africa

Information
- Type: Private, selective, day and boarding school
- Motto: Your Success is our Success
- Religious affiliation: Christianity
- Denomination: Interdenominational
- Opened: 23 January 2009
- Gender: Co-educational
- Education system: English
- Language: English
- Colours: Navy blue, Red, White, Yellow
- Nickname: Taal
- Affiliations: TalmaReal Estate
- Examination boards: Cambridge International Examinations; Higher Education Examinations Council; Zimbabwe School Examinations Council; CAPS
- Address: 51 Maxwell Road, Kempton Park, South Africa
- Website: www.taalct.co.za

Taal-Net Group of Schools is consortium of Pre-schools, Primary schools, Secondary and High schools, Higher Education and Training Colleges that offer both Boarding and Day School. The schools are located in South Africa and Zimbabwe, with Group Head Quarters at Kempton Park and Zimbabwe's Head Office at Glendale. Taal-Net schools in South Africa are registered with the Department of Education, UMALUSI, & the Department of Higher Education in Zimbabwe, Taal-Net Group of Schools are registered with the Ministry of Primary and Secondary Education (MOPSE) and the Ministry of Higher and Tertiary Education, Science & Technology Development (MHTESTD).

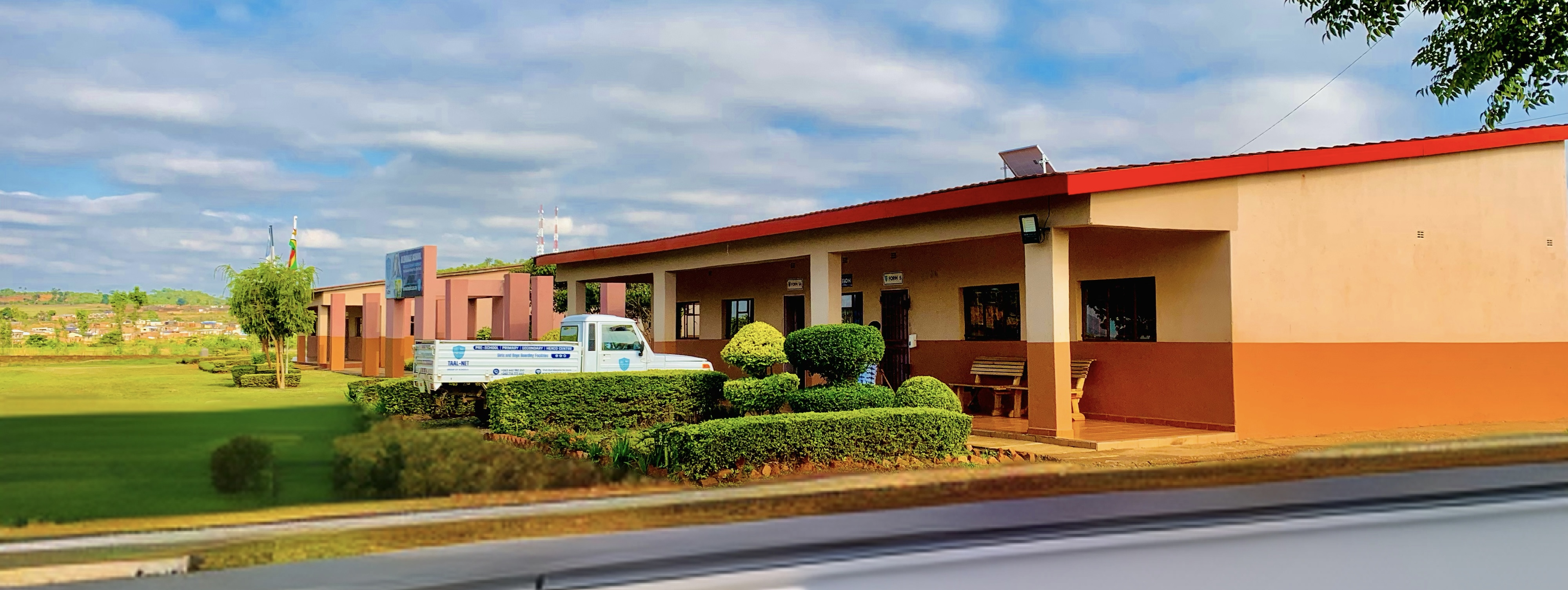
Taal-Net Glendale School

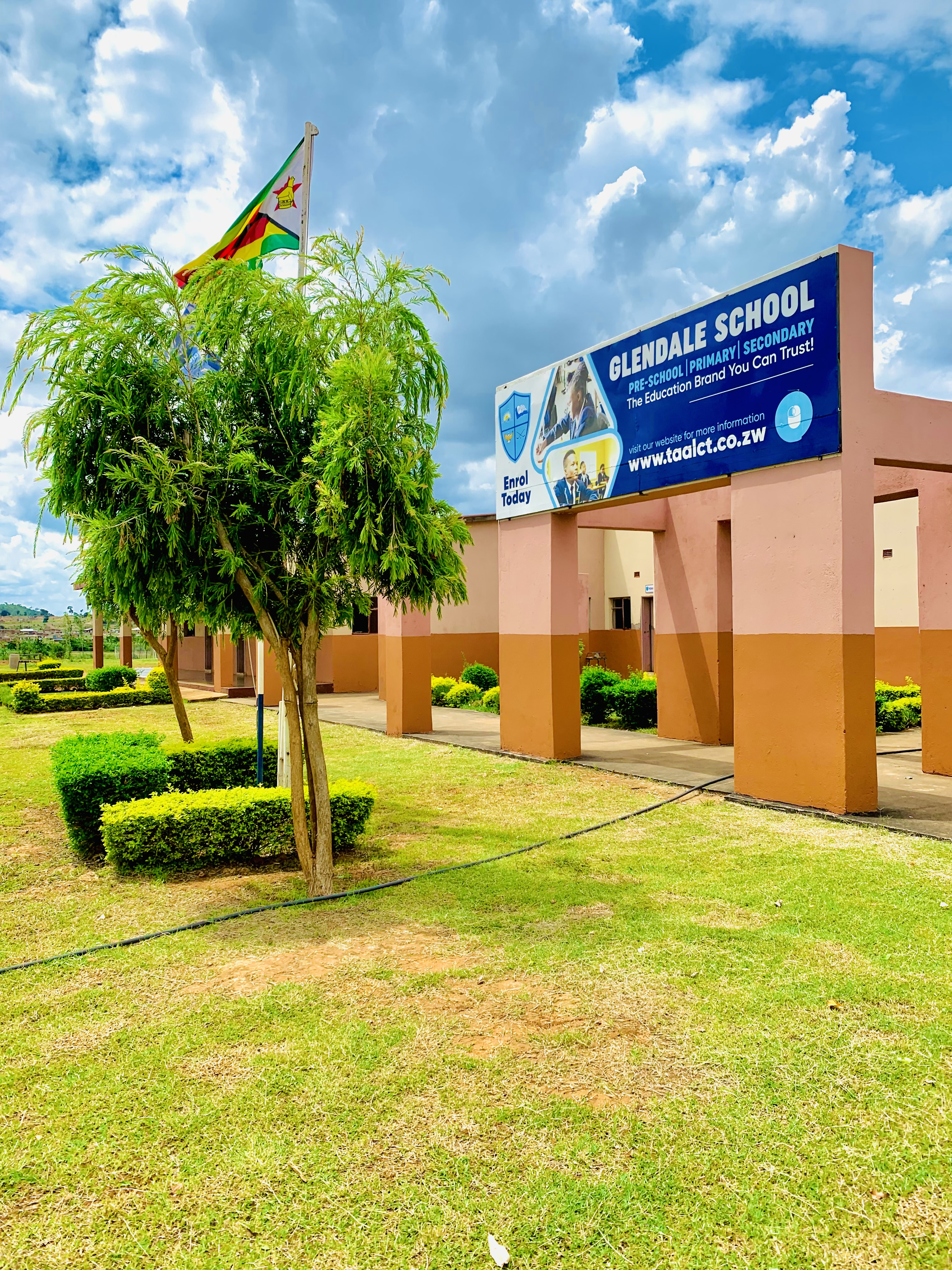
Glendale Snr School

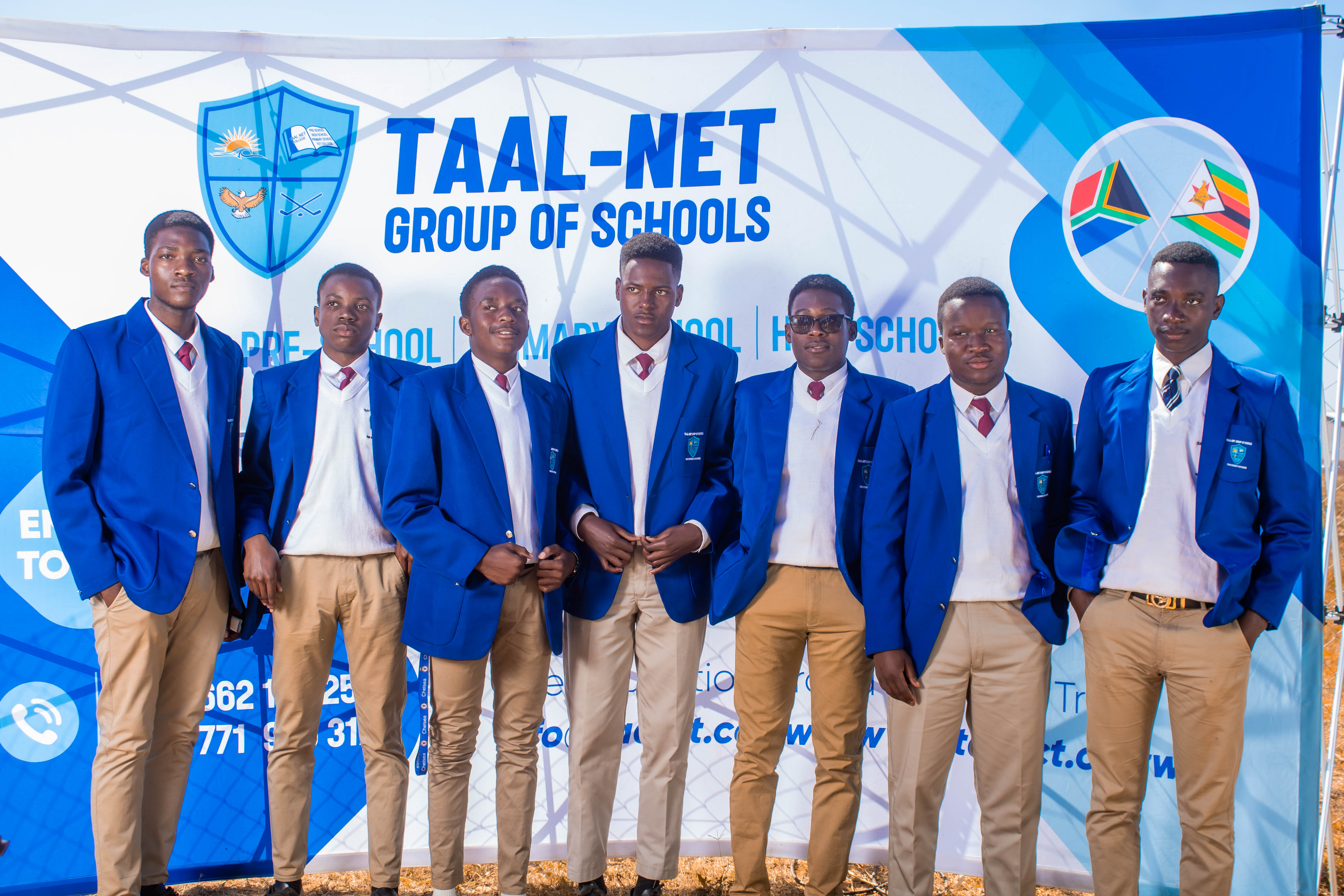
Zimbabwe Advanced Level Students

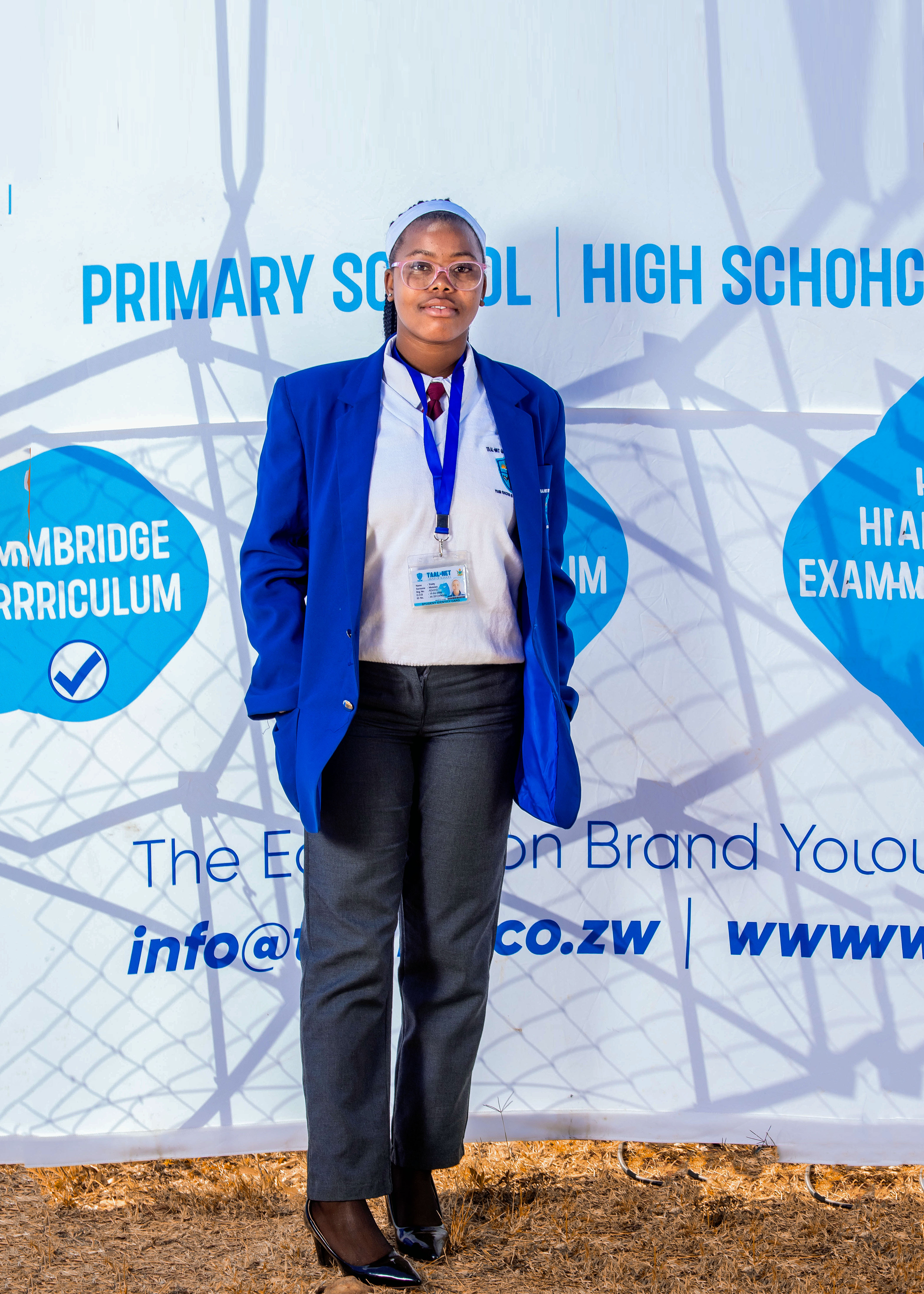
Zimbabwe Advanced Level Student

The first school was established in 2009 at 51 Maxwell Street, Kempton Park in Gauteng, South Africa; as a computer training institute. The Institution grew and evolved to encompass junior and secondary education and later opened branches which are spread in the Gauteng and Mpumalanga Provinces of South Africa. The first school in Zimbabwe was opened in 2017, at 1747 Tsungubvi, Glendale (Mazowe District) Mashonaland Central. Branches were then established in Harare, Mvurwi, Concession and Chiweshe.

Taal-Net Group of Schools branches include

1. Glen Austin, Midrand, South Africa
2. Pretoria, South Africa
3. Glendale (Zim Head Office), Zimbabwe
4. Kempton Park (Group HQ), South Africa
5. Beula Park, Germiston, South Africa
6. Turfontein, South Africa
7. Randburg, South Africa
8. Eastlea, Harare, Zimbabwe
9. Mvurwi, Mashonaland Central, Zimbabwe
10. Roodepoort, South Africa
11. Brentwood Park Benoni, South Africa
12. Concession, Mashonaland Central, Zimbabwe
13. Bellrock, in Chiweshe Mashonaland Central, Zimbabwe
14. Pretoria, South Africa
15. Soweto Oasis, South Africa

Curriculum

Taal-Net Group of Schools offer Cambridge, CAPS (South Africa), Zimsec (Zimbabwe) and HEXCO (Zimbabwe).

== Taal-Net Against Drug Abuse ==
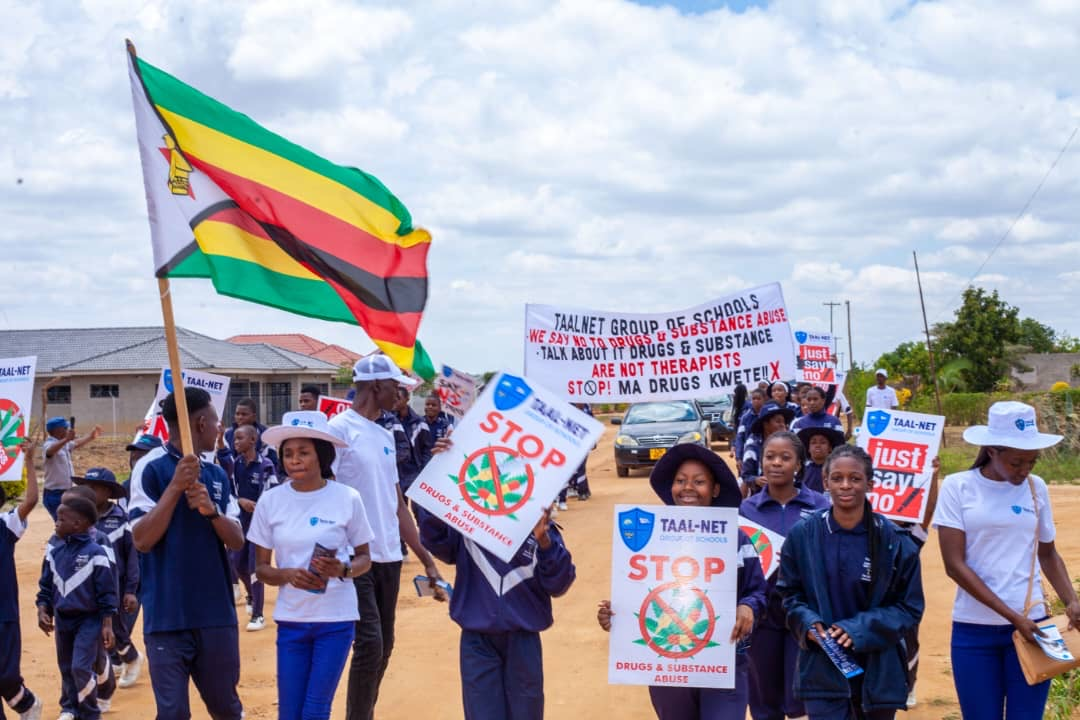
Taal-Net Mvurwi School students and educators on a march against Drug and Substance Abuse at Pembi in Mvurwi

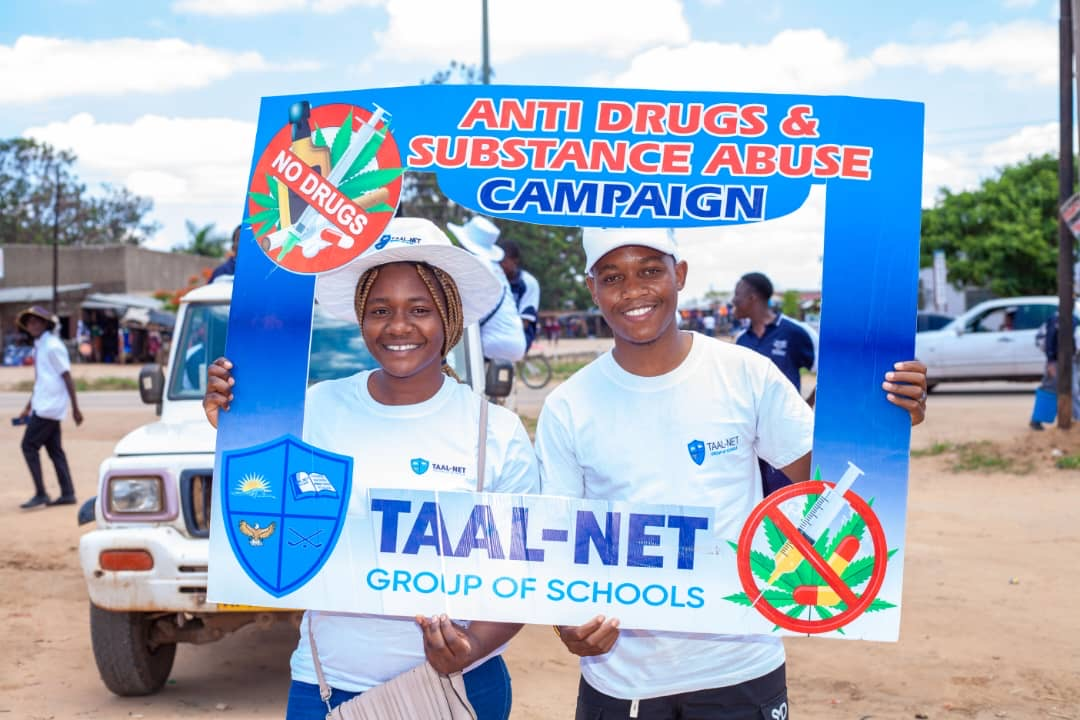
Taal-Net Mvurwi School educators during a march against Drug and Substance Abuse at Mvurwi Centre

Taal-Net Group of Schools equivocally condemns drug and substance abuse as they have gone on a street march to demonstrate against use of drugs by the youth.

== Taal-Net Group of School Celebrations ==
Taal-Net joined to the South Africa in celebration their Heritage Day in Kempton Park South Africa.
