= Rufaro High School =

Location
- Rufaro Mission, Chatsworth; Gutu; Zimbabwe
- Coordinates: 18.135°S 31.431°E

Information
- Type: Mission boarding and day school
- Motto: laborare est orare (to work is to pray)
- Religious affiliation: Christianity
- Established: 1987
- Rector: Pastor Manamike
- Headmaster: Jameson Shumbanhete
- Forms: 1-4, Sixth Form
- Gender: Co-educational
- Enrollment: 538 (2016)
- Colours: Blue, grey, white
- Nickname: RHS
- Tuition: US$130.00 (day); US$430.00 (boarding); (Note: Termly fees, the year has 3 terms.)
- Website: www.rufaro.ac.zw

Rufaro High School is the only boarding school of the Apostolic Faith Mission in Zimbabwe Church. It is located in the Gutu District of the Masvingo Province in Zimbabwe.

== See also ==
- Christianity in Zimbabwe
- Education in Zimbabwe
- List of boarding schools
- List of schools in Zimbabwe
