= Visitation-Makumbi High School =

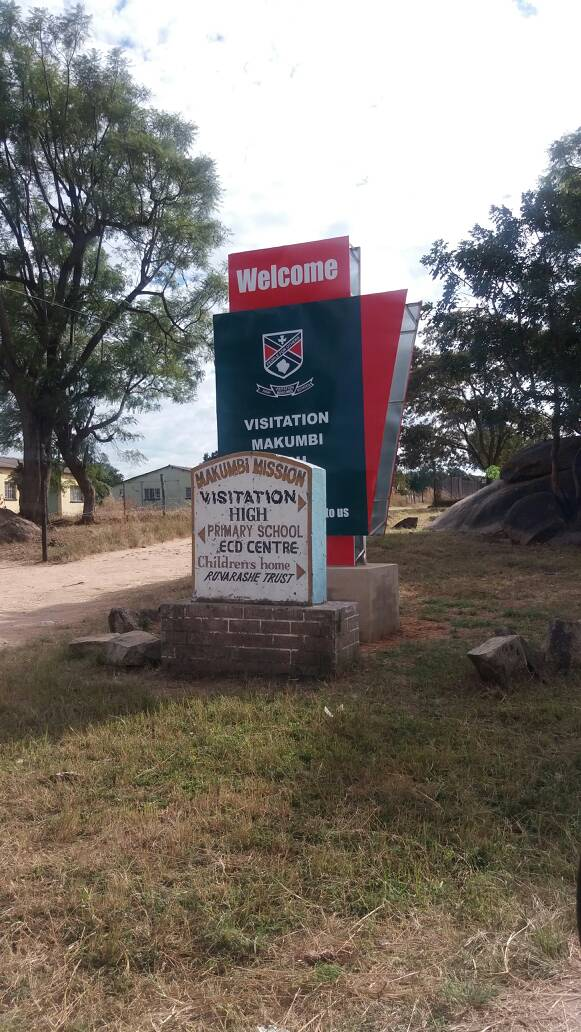
- Entrance to school in 2018

Location
- Zimbabwe
- Coordinates: 17°31′18″S 31°15′14″E

Information
- Type: Private secondary day and boarding school
- Religious affiliation: Catholicism
- Denomination: Jesuits
- Established: c. 1960; 66 years ago
- Founder: Dominican Order of Sisters
- Gender: Coeducational
- Enrollment: 846 (600 boarding)

Visitation-Makumbi High School is a private Catholic secondary day and boarding school located approximately 30 kilometres (19 mi) from Harare, Zimbabwe. The school was founded by the Dominican Order of Sisters in the early 1960s and is currently a diocesan school administered by the Society of Jesus as a part of Makumbi Mission.

== History ==
Founded in the early 1960s by Dominican sisters, the school began as a secondary school for girls. In 1973 a technical school was introduced at the Makumbi Mission to teach boys building and carpentry skills. In 1980, at independence, these two schools merged to form Makumbi Secondary School for boys and girls. Then in 1988, GCE Advanced Level was introduced to form the current Visitation-Makumbi High School.

The school is called Visitation-Makumbi High School and is a Jesuit-run high school, a part of their Makumbi Mission. It enrolls approximately 846 students, 600 of whom are boarders while the others are day-students from the surrounding area.

== Academic performance ==
In 2014, Visition-Makumbi High School was ranked number 85 out of Zimbabwe's top 100 GCE Ordinary Level schools with a pass average of 58.76%. As of 2019, the same ranking applied.

== See also ==
- Education in Zimbabwe
- List of schools in Zimbabwe
- List of Jesuit schools
