= Mazowe Boys High School =

School in Mazowe, Zimbabwe

Location
- Mazowe High School, P.Bag 211A, Harare Harare, Zimbabwe, Harare, Zimbabwe; Zimbabwe; 17.616°S 30.930°E

Information
- Type: Private; day; boarding; secondary education
- Motto: Scholarship and Service
- Religious affiliation: Christian
- Established: 1959; 67 years ago
- Founder: Salvation Army
- Sister school: Usher Girls High School
- Oversight: Ministry of Primary and Secondary Education
- Administrator: Major Jethro Chidamba
- Headmaster: Thompson Katanda
- Gender: Male (94%), Female (6%)
- Enrollment: ~650
- Campus: Rural
- Colours: Maroon, navy blue, grey, and white
- Mascot: Buffaloes
- Affiliations: Salvation Army Schools Association; National Association of School Heads

Mazowe Boys High School in Harare, Zimbabwe is a Salvation Army (private sponsored) boarding school established in 1959. The school teaches Christian values in accordance with Salvation Army principles.

== History ==
The school was originally founded in 1922 by the Salvation Army, with Captain Leonard Kirby as superintendent and ensign Kunzvi Shava as native teacher. The school was an adjunct to the corps (church) program at Pearson farm. The Salvation Army missionaries founded the school to "keep the mission going and the church-going.” In addition, it founded the school to compete with other missions that also had schools for "natives" such as the Methodist, the Seventh-Day Adventists, the Anglicans, the Church of Sweden, Matopo Mission (Brethren in Christ), Presbyterian, and the African Methodist Episcopal.

After its establishment, the school offered courses in English, arithmetic, and writing to the Shona people of the Hwata dynasty who occupied the land around Pearson farm. Classes went to Grade V. There were thirty-five boarders with additional students coming from the area. In the 1930s the Salvation Army at the Pearson Farm had been surrounded by white farmers who resented the presence of the school and its black students on land they wanted for themselves. This "trouble” at Pearson farm led Captains Kirby and Kunzvi Shava to move to Chiweshe (where Howard High School, then the Howard Institute, is now located).

By 1953, religious organizations were responsible for 98 percent of all elementary education in Rhodesia and the Salvation Army was sixth in the number of students with 14,600, behind the Dutch Reformed Church, Roman Catholic, Anglican, Methodist (U.K.), and Methodist Episcopal (U.S.) churches. Two years later the Salvation Army opened its first secondary school, housed at Howard Institute in the Chiweshe reserve (Howard High School, Mazowe). In 1959 the army transferred the school to the Pearson farm, to the site of the late-nineteenth-century mission buildings that the Salvation Army left in the area in 1923. The school’s new name was Mazowe Secondary School.

== Academics ==
Mazowe Boys is a selective school and is considered one of the best high schools in Zimbabwe. For Form One entrance, prospective students must take an entrance examination and present excellent to satisfactory Grade 7 results. Form Two students at Mazowe sit for the Salvation Army Schools Association General Certificate Examination (SASA GCE) in their third term. The SASA GCE results are used for social promotion purposes: top 45 students major in a STEM-heavy curriculum in addition to the general Ordinary Level curriculum, and the third group of students pursues a humanities-centered curriculum within the general Ordinary Level curriculum. 'A' grades at Ordinary (O) level are required to enter the Lower Sixth Form, students who attended Mazowe Form One to Form Four are not exempt from this requirement.

Mazowe follows the Zimbabwe Schools Examination Council (ZIMSEC) syllabus at O Levels and A levels.

According to Zimbabwe School Examinations Council's data, in 2013 the school was among top 20 schools in Zimbabwe.

The school was awarded the secretary's bell in 2016 for being the most developing school in Mashonaland Central Province.

== Facilities ==
=== Boarding facilities ===
The Mazowe Campus provides accommodations for students. Students are housed according to the year they are in. The houses are Elephant, Buffalo, Sable, Antelope, Kudu, Impala, Roan, and Eland.

=== Academic facilities ===
In 2014, Mazowe Boys High School opened two computer labs equipped with 84 computers worth $120,000.

== Athletic and extracurricular activities ==
At Mazowe Boys High School more than 75% of the student body is involved in some physical or extracurricular activity. Sports at the school include basketball, cricket, field hockey, soccer, swimming, tennis, track and field, and volleyball. Extracurricular activities include school band, choir, chess, Current Affairs club, debate, Lions Clubs International, Rotary International, Scripture Union, Toastmasters International, and Youth Against AIDS.

== Alumni ==
Mazowe graduates entered regional universities such as the University of Zimbabwe, National University of Science and Technology, Zimbabwe, Africa University, and University of Cape Town and international institutions such as those in the Russell Group in the United Kingdom. More than 80% of Mazowe graduates go on to study STEM-related fields such as medicine and engineering.

== Notable alumni ==
- Amos Midzi

== See also ==
- List of schools in Zimbabwe
- List of boarding schools in Zimbabwe
- Education in Zimbabwe
