= Lingfield Christian Academy =

- Lingfied Christian Academy Logo

Location
- 22 Lingfield Road; Gweru; Zimbabwe
- Coordinates: 19°26′52.0″S 29°51′53.5″E

Information
- Type: Independent, boarding and day school
- Motto: Veritas et Utilitas (Latin: Truth and Service)
- Headmaster: Crispin Eley
- Gender: Co-educational
- Language: English
- School fees: US$982.00 - US$2,480.00
- Website: lingfield.org

Lingfield Christian Academy is an independent, boarding and day school for boys and girls in Gweru, Zimbabwe.

== Academics ==
Lingfield Christian Academy offers programs developed and examined by Cambridge International Examinations, such as the Cambridge IGCSE and Cambridge International AS/A Level. The school also offers ZIMSEC qualifications.

== Activities ==
Lingfield has the following sports on offer: archery, athletics, basketball, cricket, English riding (horse riding), football, fishing, golf, hockey, polo crosse, rugby, swimming, tennis and volleyball.

The following clubs and societies are on offer at Lingfield: Community Service, Debating Society, Equestrian Club, Scripture Union, Student Government and Student Newspaper.

== See also ==
- List of schools in Zimbabwe
- List of boarding schools
