= Emerald Hill School, Zimbabwe =

School and home for deaf children in Zimbabwe

Coordinates: 17°46′35″S 31°01′57″E

Information
- Established: 1914; 112 years ago
- Teaching staff: c.50
- Enrollment: c.245 (2005)

Emerald Hill is a school and home for deaf children located in Harare, Zimbabwe. It was established in 1914 by Dominican sisters.

By 1955, the school had moved to Emerald Hill, Harare, from the Midlands Province. At that time, it had 80 students and 5 teachers. It operated as an orphanage and children's home. They only took in white boys and girls. The boys could only stay until puberty but the girls could stay until maturity and were able to find employment.

Due to rapid growth, of the student population, construction of a new (primary) school started in 1983. In 1985, work started on a secondary school. As of 2005, the school had about 245 students and 50 teachers (including 10 specialists).

== See also ==
- List of schools in Zimbabwe
- Education in Zimbabwe
