= List of universities in Zimbabwe =

This is a list of universities in Zimbabwe.

- Africa University (AU)
- Arrupe Jesuit University (AJU)
- Bindura University of Science Education (BUSE)
- Catholic University of Zimbabwe (CUZ)
- Chinhoyi University of Technology (CUT)
- Great Zimbabwe University, formerly Masvingo State University
- Gwanda State University (GSU)
- Harare Institute of Technology (HIT)
- Lupane State University (LSU)
- Midlands State University (MSU)
- National University of Science and Technology, Zimbabwe (NUST)
- Reformed Church University
- Solusi University
- University of Zimbabwe (UZ)
- Women's University in Africa (WUA)
- Zimbabwe Ezekiel Guti University (ZEGU)
- Zimbabwe Open University (ZOU)

== See also ==
- Education in Zimbabwe
- Schools in Zimbabwe
- Levels of education: higher education, foundation degree and further education
