= Goldridge College =

Location
- 825 Jason Moyo Avenue, Newtown; Kwekwe, Midlands Province; Zimbabwe; 18.9424°S 29.8196°E

Information
- Type: Independent, boarding and day senior school
- Motto: Striving for excellence
- Denomination: Interdenominational
- Opened: 2001
- Oversight: Goldridge Schools
- Principal: Mr Lovemore Mashanda
- Headmistress: Mrs Saunyama
- Forms: 1-4, Sixth Form
- Gender: Co-educational
- Enrollment: 314 (2016)
- Campus type: Suburban
- Houses: Mupani, Muonde Musasa
- School fees: US$2,700 acceptance fee
- Annual tuition: US$ 1800 (day); US$ 3900(boarding G-Side); US$375 bus and pool levies
- Feeder schools: Goldridge Primary School
- Affiliations: ATS; CHISZ
- Website: www.goldridgecollege.ac.zw

Goldridge College (or Goldridge) is a co-educational, independent, boarding and day senior school in Kwekwe, Zimbabwe. Opened in 2001, the school is located in the low-density suburb of Newtown and is in close proximity to Kwekwe Sports Club. The school is run by the Goldridge Schools Board of Governors, which similarly runs the nearby feeder school, Goldridge Primary.

Goldridge College is a member of the Association of Trust Schools (ATS).The headmaster is a member of the Conference of Heads of Independent Schools in Zimbabwe (CHISZ).

== Academics ==
Goldridge College is a registered Cambridge International Examinations (CIE) centre. Students write the CIE Checkpoint, IGCSE, AS Level and A Level examinations.

== Sport ==
Students are expected to take part in at least one sport each term. Goldridge College offers numerous sports such as athletics, basketball, cross country, cricket, golf, hockey, netball, rugby, soccer, swimming, and tennis.

== Clubs and Cultural Activities ==
Goldridge College offers the following cultural activities: Drama, Debating, Quiz, Public Speaking, Elocution, Choir, Marimba band and Jazz band.

Goldridge College students are required to attend at least one club activity. The clubs offered include Youth Alive, Chess, Interact, Library, Debate and Public Speaking, Information Communication Technology and Media, Grooming, Interact, Leo Club, Instrumental Music, Scripture Union, Art, SETA Engineering, Junior Achievers, Young Artists Poetry Society, and Mathematical olympiad.

== Alumni ==
Most of Goldridge College's alumni go on to further their education at tertiary level. Some alumni have been accepted to prestigious universities such as Columbia University in the City of New York, Massachusetts Institute of Technology and the University of Cape Town.

Alumni who have attended Goldridge Primary School and Goldridge College are usually referred to as 'Goldridgians'.

== See also ==
- List of schools in Zimbabwe
- List of boarding schools
- Education in Zimbabwe
