= St. Paul's High School, Musami =

St. Paul's Musami High School

Location
- Murewa, Harare; Zimbabwe; 17°45′9″S 31°34′51″E

Information
- Type: Private secondary school
- Religious affiliation: Catholicism
- Denomination: Jesuit
- Established: 1923; 103 years ago
- Administrator: Richard Hlombe
- Grades: 7-12, including A-levels
- Gender: Co-educational

St. Paul's Musami High School is a private Catholic secondary school, located in Murewa District, Mashonaland East, Zimbabwe. The co-educational school is operated by the Society of Jesus and provides education through to A-levels.

St. Paul's ranked 24th among the top 100 A-level schools in Zimbabwe in 2014 with all but one of 61 of its students who took the exam passing.

== History ==
=== 1977 mission massacre ===
During the Rhodesian Bush War, the school and associated Musami mission was the site of massacre of clergy on February 6, 1977. Three members of the British Province of the Society of Jesus and four members of the Dominican sisters were shot and killed. The killers were not identified. The unknown black guerrillas separated the white clergyman and teachers from the rest of the mission to a dirt road and opened fire with automatic weapons. Only Rev. Dunstan Myerscough survived because he had instinctively dropped to the ground right after the guerrillas opened fire. The deceased were British, West German, Irish and Kenyan citizens. At the time of the massacre, the mission had 400 black students and a 100-bed hospital.

== See also ==
- Catholic Church in Zimbabwe
- Education in Zimbabwe
- List of Jesuit schools
