= St. Augustine's College Bulawayo =

Zimbabwean Roman Catholic secondary school

Location
- Bulawayo, Matabeleland Region; Zimbabwe; 20°07′52″S 28°36′18″E

Information
- Type: Public middle school and high school (Senior One to Senior Six) (age: 13-19)
- Motto: "Sapientia, Armor et Veritas" (Hope, love and truth)
- Religious affiliation: Zimbabwe Catholic Bishops' Conference
- Established: January 1, 2024; 2 years ago
- Principal & Chaplain: Father Tryvis Moyo C.Ss.R.
- Headteacher: Thomas Khumalo
- Enrollment: 75 (December 2024) (Capacity: 400)

St. Augustine's College Bulawayo, also St. Augustine's Catholic College is a co-educational day and boarding secondary school located in the suburb of Sunnyside in the city of Bulawayo, Bulawayo Province in the Matabeleland Region of Zimbabwe. The school opened in January 2024 on premises formerly occupied by St Augustine's Seminary, which closed in 2016. The Zimbabwe Catholic Bishops' Conference, at their administrative meeting in August 2023 at Masvingo, resolved to open this new school at the then vacant premises. In January 2024, the school opened with 40 day scholars with plans to admit boarders in January 2025.

== Location ==
The school campus is situated at the corner of Netherby Drive and Welby Road in the suburb of Sunnyside in the city of Bulawayo, in Zimbabwe. This is approximately 4 kilometres (2.5 mi), by road, north of the central business district of Bulawayo. The coordinates of St. Augustine's College Bulawayo are: 20°07'52.0"S, 28°36'18.0"E (Latitude:-20.131111; Longitude: 28.605000).

== History ==
The school was founded in August 2023 by resolution of the Zimbabwe Catholic Bishops' Conference, at their administrative meeting in August 2023 at Masvingo. The Conference resolved to start this school at the premises formerly occupied by St. Augustine's Seminary in Bulawayo that at time lay empty. The school opened in January 2024 to 40 day students, with the expectation to admit the first boarding students in January 2025.

== Background ==
Before 2016, the Zimbabwe Catholic Bishops' Conference (ZCBC) built St. Augustine Seminary intended to teach Philosophy to seminarians studying to become Catholic priests. Due to low enrollment numbers, the seminary was closed in 2016 and the instructors were transferred to Chishawasha Major Seminary near Harare. At its administrative meeting in August 2023, the ZCBC resolved to convert the idle campus in Bulawayo into a co-educational day and boarding secondary school with opening day in January 2024.

== See also ==
- Education in Zimbabwe
- List of secondary schools in Bulawayo
