= Sidakeni Secondary School =

Coordinates: 18.444525°S 29.468561°E

- Zhombe-East, Midlands; Zimbabwe

Information
- Type: Day school
- Established: 1981
- Authority: Zibagwe Rural District Council
- Gender: co-educational
- Classes offered: Form 1 to 6

Sidakeni Secondary School is a rural co-educational secondary school in Sidakeni ward of Kwekwe District.

It was established in 1981.

It is 64 km southwest of Kadoma and 92 km northwest-north of Kwekwe by road.

The school's name comes from the name of the village in which the school is situated. "Sidakeni" is a Ndebele adjective meaning a muddy place (esidakeni). The soil at this location is mud dull-grey in colour.

Sidakeni High School offers educational services from Form 1 to 6.

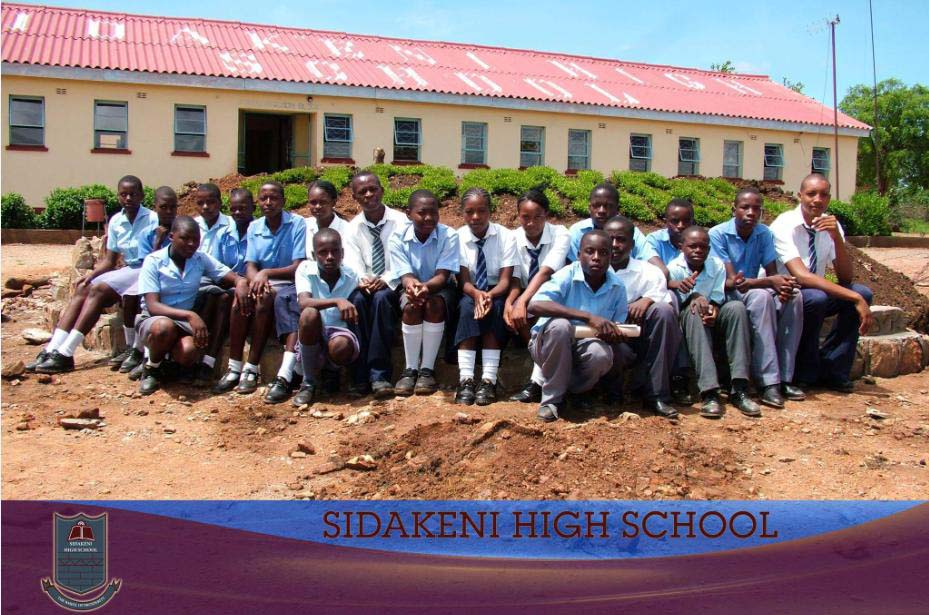
Sidakeni High School 2014 A'Level

== Alumni ==
Somandla Ndebele a sungura musician now based in Harare did secondary education here before relocating to Dzivarasekwa for high school.

== See also ==
- Zhombe Sidakeni Ward
- Sidakeni Schools
- List of schools in Zimbabwe Zhombe Secondary Schools
