= Vida Mungwira =

First African woman doctor in Southern Africa (born c. 1935)

- Born: Vida Victoria Mungwira c. 1935 (age 90–91)
- Education: University of Bristol
- Occupation: Medical doctor
- Known for: First African woman doctor from the Federation of Rhodesia and Nyasaland

Vida Victoria Mungwira (born c. 1935) was the first African woman to become a doctor from the Federation of Rhodesia and Nyasaland. Mungwira certified as a doctor in the United Kingdom before returning to Africa to practice in the territory known as Nyasaland under British colonial rule, in today's Malawi and Zimbabwe.

== Biography ==
Mungwira grew up in Southern Africa under British colonial rule. Mungwira's family was from a district known as Nyasaland, which was then part of the Federation of Rhodesia and Nyasaland. Mungwira grew up speaking Chewa and was a member of the Bantu people.

Mungwira's early education took place at the Howard Institute, a school run by a Salvation Army Mission in the town of Glendale, a village in today's Mazowe District, Mashonaland Central province of Zimbabwe. Later she undertook secondary studies at Inanda Seminary School followed by Fort Hare University, where she graduated with a Bachelors of Science degree in 1954. Fort Hare University was an institution that served only black students, due to the system of apartheid in South Africa at the time, but all of their exams were from Rhodes University. There were ten students from what is now Malawi. These were Orton Chirwa, Wellington Manoah Chirwa and Harry Bwanausi, Walter Dyson Chona, Edward D. Mwasi, Henry Blasius Masauko Chipembere, Moir Chisuse, Vincent Gondwe and Gertrude Rubadiri. They were not in a white university but their syllabuses and exams were from Rhodes University.

In 1955, Mungwira travelled to the United Kingdom to study medicine at the University of Bristol. She obtained her degree at age 26 in July 1961. Upon her graduation, Mungwira became the first African woman to qualify as a doctor from the territory of Rhodesia and Nyasaland. After graduation, she remained in the United Kingdom for a year of compulsory practical training.

In 1962, at the age of 27, Mungwira returned to Africa to practise medicine. Little is known about her later life as a physician. On her return, she expressed a preference to practise medicine at a rural hospital in her home province of Nyasaland, where she grew up. Nyasaland existed until 1964, when it became independent from Britain and was renamed Malawi. In the 1970s, Mungwira's medical practice was based in Salisbury (present-day Harare).

== See also ==
- Madeline Nyamwanza-Makonese, the first Zimbabwean female doctor, the second African woman to become a doctor, and the first African woman to graduate from the University of Rhodesia Medical School
