= Hellenic Academy =

Hellenic
- Hellenic Academy Logo

Location
- 42-46 Basset Crescent, New Alexandra Park; Harare; Zimbabwe; 17°46′58″S 31°04′23″E

Information
- Type: Independent, day high school
- Motto: Greek: Αίεν αριστεύειν (Always Excellence)
- Religious affiliation: Christianity
- Denomination: Greek Orthodox
- Established: 2008
- Forms: 1–4, Sixth Form
- Gender: Co-educational
- Enrollment: 578 (2016)
- Education system: Zimbabwean
- Colours: Blue and White
- Tuition: US$4000.00 (Note: Termly fees, the year has 3 terms.)
- Feeder schools: Hellenic Primary School
- Affiliations: ATS; CHISZ
- Website: www.hellenicacademy.ac.zw

Hellenic Academy is an independent, co-educational, day school in Harare, Zimbabwe. The school was founded by the local Greek community in 2008.

Hellenic is a member of the Association of Trust Schools (ATS) and the Head is a member of the Conference of Heads of Independent Schools in Zimbabwe (CHISZ).

== History ==
Hellenic was built by the Greek Community to further the standard of education offered by Hellenic Primary School. The project to build the school began in 2007 and Hellenic Academy was opened in 2008. The school's enrolment grew to 550 pupils in 2014.

== Sports ==
The sports on offer at Hellenic in summer include cricket, tennis, water polo, swimming, athletics, cross country, triathlon and Rugby 7s.

In winter, the students participate in the following sporting disciplines: rugby 15s, field hockey, X Training, social soccer (for boys) and girls soccer

== Clubs and cultural activities ==
Hellenic has the following cultural activities on offer: Orchestra, String Orchestra, Wind Band, Choirs, Madrigals, Marimbas, Rock Band.

There are many clubs at Hellenic that students are encouraged to take part in. These include the Greek Culture Club, Baking Club, Drama Club, Art Club, Book Club, Public Speaking, Quiz Club, Environmental Club, Social Dance Club, Golf, Squash, First Aid Club, Robotics Club, Yoga Club, Events Team, Model United Nations Club, Interact Club, Duathlon, Toastmasters, Rugby Referees Club and Flipside.

== See also ==
- List of schools in Zimbabwe
- Education in Zimbabwe
