= His Mercy Christian College =

School in Zimbabwe

His Mercy Christian College is a school in Borrowdale, Harare, Zimbabwe.

== See also ==
- Education in Zimbabwe
- List of schools in Zimbabwe
