= Groupe Scolaire Jean de La Fontaine =

Location
- 1 Teign Road, Vainona; Harare; Zimbabwe

Information
- Type: International school
- Enrollment: 170
- Website: ef-harare.net

The French International School of Harare or Groupe Scolaire Jean de La Fontaine is a French international school in Vainona, Harare, Zimbabwe. Registered with the Agency for French Education Abroad (AEFE), it serves preschool to the upper secondary (lycée) levels. As of 2026 the school has 137 students from over 25 countries.

Students taking upper secondary classes use the National Centre for Distance Education (CNED) distance education programme.

== See also ==
- List of schools in Zimbabwe
- List of international schools
- Education in Zimbabwe
