= Girls' College =

Location
- 62 Livingstone Road, Suburbs; Bulawayo; Zimbabwe

Information
- Type: Independent, day and boarding high school
- Motto: Our Hope Is Constant In Thee
- Founded: 1983
- Oversight: Girls' College Trust
- Principal: Asani Phiri
- Gender: Girls
- Enrollment: 567 (2016)
- Houses: Maleme Mtshelele Matobo
- Tuition: US$2,400 per term (day); US$5,830 per term (boarding); (Note: The academic year has 3 terms.)
- Affiliations: ATS; CHISZ
- Website: www.girlscollegebulawayo.org

Girls' College is an independent, day and boarding high school for girls in Bulawayo, Zimbabwe. The school was founded in 1983.

Girls' College is a member of the Association of Trust Schools and the Head is a member of the Conference of Heads of Independent Schools in Zimbabwe.

== History ==
The Girls' College Trust was formed in September 1982 for the purpose of establishing a private, multi-racial, interdenominational secondary school for girls in Bulawayo. In January 1983, Girls' College opened with an initial enrollment of seventy-five Form One pupils and six teachers with Ross Fuller as the headmaster of the institution. The school is located at what was the Queens Court residential hotel, which had closed down in 1982. The introduction of Forms Two and Three took place in May 1983 and the first sitting for Cambridge O level examinations at the school was in November 1984. The Sixth Form was introduced in 1985 with the first sitting for Cambridge A-level examinations.

Girls' College grew in terms of enrollment and infrastructure. The Ross Fuller Hall was opened in 1991, surrounding residences were bought and turned into hostels. A building across the road from the main school premises was acquired and named Palmer House with the purpose of establishing commercial classes. Another building, adjacent to Palmer House was constructed for art and IT subjects. Tennis courts and a swimming pool were also constructed. A 'Garden of Remembrance' was also built on the main school premise to commemorate teachers and pupils who had died.

Ross Fuller retired in 2003 and was succeeded by Hazel Vorster. Upon her resignation in 2007, she was temporarily replaced by Mr Todd until Lesley Ross was ready to take her place as headmistress in 2008.

== The badge ==
It features a central crossed crosslet in red (an insignia which forms part of the coat-of-arms for the City of Bulawayo). The school motto, “Our Hope Is Constant In Thee”, found underneath the crosslet, affirms the school's Christian basis. Above the crosslet are three interlocking gold-coloured amulets which are symbolic, on three different levels, depending on the context in which one wishes to view them. It symbolises the teachers, pupils, and parents; or the academic, cultural, and physical aspects of the school; or the commercial, industrial, and educational professions which co-operated to establish the school.

== List of College Heads ==
- Mr Ross Fuller (1983–2003)
- Mrs Hazel Vorster (2003–2007)
- Mr Neil Todd (2007–2008)
- Mrs Lesley Ross (2008–2025)
- Mr Asani Phiri (2026-)

== Notable alumnae ==
- Novuyo Tshuma - Zimbabwean author
- Chelsy Davy - Zimbabwean businesswoman

== See also ==
- List of boarding schools
- List of schools in Zimbabwe
- Lists of girls' schools
