= Westridge High School =

Location
- Ganges Road, Belvedere; Harare; Zimbabwe
- Coordinates: 17.83990°S 31.01134°E

Information
- Type: Private High School
- Motto: Sat, Chit, Ananda (Knowledge, Enlightenment, Service)
- Founded: 1999; 27 years ago
- Founder: Harare Hindoo Society
- Headmaster: Mrs. P. Makoni
- Forms: 1-6
- Gender: Co-educational
- Enrollment: 200-250
- Campus type: Suburban
- Tuition: $2250
- Feeder schools: Westridge Primary School
- Affiliations: ATS; CHISZ
- Website: westridgeschools.ac.zw/high/

Westridge High School is an independent, day school in Harare, Zimbabwe. It was founded in 1999 by the Hindoo Society, a registered welfare organization dating back to 1916.

Westridge High School is a member of the Association of Trust Schools (ATS) and the Headmaster is a member of the Conference of Heads of Independent Schools in Zimbabwe (CHISZ).

== Overview ==
The school has approximately 250 students from Form One (Freshman) to Form 6 (Seniors). Westridge High School follows the traditional Zimbabwean-British system of education in which examinations are administered at both Ordinary Level, and at Advanced Subsidiary and A Level. Westridge High school is located in Belvedere and the primary school within the same property area.

The founding headmaster is Mr N. Kala (1999 - 2006), then came Mr. R. Ramlaul (late), who was an expert in Geography. Followed by Mr. D. Chouhan, a Mathematics expert, followed by Mr. J. Davies, a Physics expert and the current headmaster is Mrs. P Makoni Subjects include English, Math, Physics, Chemistry, Biology, Computer Science, Information and Communication Technology, Accounting, Business Studies, Economics, Geography, English Literature, History, Shona, Art and Design Technology. The school also has several sports and clubs. The sports the school offers include soccer, cricket, hockey, tennis, basketball, badminton, table tennis, volleyball, swimming. The clubs at the school are chess, art and craft, debate, interact, Coding or Animation, Zimun and many more .

Westridge high school has 4 Group houses which are namely Shanti (Green house), Dharma (Blue house), Satya (Yellow house) and Prema (Red house) .Each house name represents a virtue that is regarded as important in hindoo culture with shanti referring to peace, dharma referring to path of rightness, satya referring to truth and prema referring to love. Upon registration in form 1, each pupil will be given a house that they have to represent in various academic and sport endeavors e.g. Athletics, debate, swimming, Quiz and many many more. Once a pupil is assigned a house, they represent it for the next 6 years at the school. Please note "house" does not refer to boarding/residence as Westridge is a non boarding school. In this context house refers to a "team/group" that all students get equally divided into .

Westridge also has a primary and nursery school which allows pupils to develop from young kids to adults. Westridge is Multicultural and deemed one of the most welcoming schools in Harare.

== See also ==
- List of schools in Zimbabwe
