= Chitakatira High School =

School in Zimbabwe

Coordinates: 19.148081°S 32.68127°E

- Mutare, Zimbabwe; Zimbabwe

Information
- Type: High school
- Established: c. 1980s
- Forms: I - VI
- Gender: Mixed

Chitakatira High School is a co-educational school from First Form to Sixth Form located on the outskirts of Mutare, Zimbabwe, about 23 kilometers from the City of Mutare. It is situated along the Burma Valley road. It was established in the early 1980s after Zimbabwean Independence.

== Notable alumni ==
- Moses Magadza, journalist
