= Luveve Technical High School =

School in Zimbabwe

- School badge
- Luveve, Bulawayo; Zimbabwe

Information
- Former name: Technical Teacher Training College (from 1965); Luveve Secondary School (until 1992); Luveve High School (1992 to 2023)
- Type: Government day and boarding secondary school
- Motto: In Pursuit of Excellence
- Established: 1965
- School Head: M. Ndlovu
- Teaching staff: c. 66
- Enrollment: c. 1,365 (2026)
- Colours: Blue and black
- Website: luvevehighschool.co.zw

Luveve Technical High School, also known as Luveve High School, is a government secondary school in the suburb of Luveve in Bulawayo, Zimbabwe. It was granted Advanced Level status in 1992 and in 2023 was designated Bulawayo's pilot technical high school. It was established in January 1958 as a technical college for African students. In 1965, after the technical college closed following Rhodesia's Unilateral Declaration of Independence, it became the Technical Teacher Training College, and later a secondary school. Initially the school was open to only male students and had an initial enrollment of 45 students in 1958.

It was built to train Africans in technical trades with a view to them returning to their homelands to teach their peers the trades that they had learned. At that time only the staff were multi-racial, the majority being white, some local, but many brought in on special contracts from the UK.

== Academics ==
The school teaches Forms 1 to 6 and enters candidates for the Zimbabwe School Examinations Council Ordinary and Advanced Level examinations. In April 2023 the Ministry of Primary and Secondary Education named it the pilot technical high school for Bulawayo, one for each province. Its technical subjects include Building, Food, Metal, Textile and Wood Technology and Design, Agriculture and Computer Science. The school was also chosen to pilot aviation studies, which had not started by late 2025. In the November 2013 examinations the school's Advanced Level pass rate was 86.59 per cent, tenth among Bulawayo schools. At the 2025 prize-giving the head reported an Advanced Level pass rate of 90 per cent for 2024.

== Sport and culture ==
The school is known for volleyball. In June 2015 it hosted the National Association of Secondary Heads Under-17 inter-provincial volleyball championships, the first time the tournament was held in Bulawayo, from which Zimbabwe's team for the COSSASA games was chosen. Two handball courts were built at the school for the 2013 Zimbabwe National Youth Games. In July 2015 the school's debating team won its pool at the national senior quarter-finals in Harare.

== Notable alumni ==
- Welshman Ncube, lawyer and politician
- Wedu Ndebele, paediatrician
- Charles Ndlovu, liberation war veteran and army officer
- Geoffrey Ndlovu, footballer
- Brigadier-General (Rtd) Shadreck Ndabambi Rungani
