= Tsholotsho High School =

Location
- Tsholotsho, Bulawayo. Zimbabwe; 19.76526°S 27.72632°E

Information
- Established: 1977

Tsholotsho High School is a co-educational, secondary school that is located in Tsholotsho 113 km south west of Zimbabwe's second largest city, Bulawayo. It was established in 1977 as Tsholotsho Secondary School.
