= Petra High School =

- Petra Badge

Location
- Stand 14502 Chelmsford Road, Matsheumhlope; Bulawayo; Zimbabwe
- Coordinates: 20.1756952°S 28.6345009°E

Information
- Type: Independent, day school
- Motto: On This Rock
- Religious affiliation: Christianity
- Founded: 1993
- Headmaster: Robert Aldridge
- Forms: 1-4, Sixth Form
- Gender: Co-educational
- Enrollment: 434 (2016)
- Campus type: Suburban
- Tuition: U$2,000.00 (Note: Termly fees, the year has 3 terms.)
- Feeder schools: Petra Primary School
- Affiliations: ATS; CHISZ
- Website: petra.college

Petra High School (or Petra) is an independent, co-educational, school in Bulawayo, Zimbabwe. Petra was founded in 1993.

Petra High School is a member of the Association of Trust Schools (ATS) and the Headmistress is a member of the Conference of Heads of Independent Schools in Zimbabwe (CHISZ). The school offers Cambridge International Exams along with ZIMSEC syllabus.

== History ==
Petra High School was started with 60 pupils in Form One in 1993, using the present Grade One and Two block at Petra Primary School, and an old Lewis Lumber shed as the Office, until later taking over the office in the Primary School Administration Block, used as the sick bay today. Tim Middleton was the first headmaster, joining the school in the third term of 1993.

== List of Heads at Petra ==
- Tim Middleton (1993–2002)
- Ray Pountney
- Christopher Hingley
- Joe Mandikate
- Crispin Eley (2010–2014)
- Heather Wells (2015–2019) promoted to principal (2019–Present)
- Robert Aldridge (2019–Present)

== See also ==
- List of schools in Zimbabwe
