= Lady Enereta High School =

Cambridge International high school in Zimbabwe

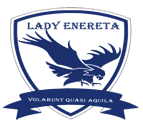

Location
- Bindura; Zimbabwe; 17.1138°S 31.4021°E

Information
- Type: Private school
- Established: 15 January 2020
- Principal: Micheal P Mhlanga
- Website: www.ladyenereta.ac.zw

Lady Enereta High School is an independent Cambridge International high school located in Bindura, 24 km (15 mi) north of Bindura Town in Zimbabwe. It is located approximately 111 km (69 mi) from the city of Harare along the Bindura/Mt. Darwin highway (A11).

Lady Enereta is a modern International high school offering full boarding facilities for both boys and girls from form 1 to form 6. The school opened its doors in January 2020 and in its first year of operation, it enrolled learners in form 1, 2, and lower 6 classes. The school is run by a board of directors and owned by a family trust. Until March 2020, David Mutambara, an educationist, was the chairman of the board of directors of Lady Enereta High School before Lanny Diamond took over as the chairman of the board of directors in April 2020.

The school is wholly owned by the Oliver Mutyambizi Trust.
