= St. Peter's Kubatana =

Location
- High Glen Road; Glen Norah, Harare; Zimbabwe
- Coordinates: 17°54′19.5″S 30°58′59.77″E

Information
- Former name: St Peter’s Community Secondary School
- Type: Private secondary school and vocational training centre
- Religious affiliation: Catholicism
- Denomination: Jesuit
- Established: 1963; 63 years ago
- Principal: Dominic Shoniwa
- Enrollment: 1,051
- Tuition: US$150 per term

St. Peter's Kubatana is a private Catholic secondary school and vocational training centre, located in Glen Norah, Harare, Zimbabwe. The school was founded by the Society of Jesus in 1963.

== History ==
In 1963 the Jesuit parish in the present Mbare area of Harare opened St. Peter’s Community Secondary School (SPCSS) for students in poverty.

The high school has, by one account, been ranked as fourth best high school in Harare.

== Programs ==
St. Peter's Kubatana Training Centre in Highfield, Harare, has launched an arts and culture programme and helps students to pursue arts as a career. It also assists local artists with further training and offers space for work and for exhibitions. The technical school at St. Peter’s Kubatanahas has expanded to include welding, sewing, motor mechanics, automobile and mechanical engineering, construction and civil engineering, and woodworking. St. Peter's is also a part of a United Nations' effort to strengthen vocational and technical education in Zimbabwe.

== See also ==
- Catholic Church in Zimbabwe
- Education in Zimbabwe
- List of Jesuit schools
