= Midlands Christian College =

Location
- Long Road, New Christmas Gift; Gweru; Zimbabwe
- Coordinates: 18.148°S 31.444°E

Information
- Type: Independent / Private, boarding and day school
- Motto: Our Strength Is In God
- Religious affiliation: Christianity
- Established: 1987
- Rector: Pastor Doug Darby
- Principal: Pastor Daniel Pswara
- Forms: 1–4, Sixth Form
- Gender: Co-educational
- Enrollment: 315
- Colours: Blue, White, Red
- Nickname: MCC
- Tuition: 2,670 USD term(day scholar); 4,750 USD term(boarding); (Note: Termly fees, the year has 3 terms.)
- Affiliations: ATS; CHISZ; ACSI
- Website: www.mcc.ac.zw

Midlands Christian College (MCC) is a private co-educational high school of about 450 pupils ranging from form 1 to form 6, located in the city of Gweru, Zimbabwe. The college has boarding facilities as well as providing for day-scholars. Its name refers to its location in the Midlands Province in central Zimbabwe.

Midlands Christian College is a member of the Association of Trust Schools (ATS) and the Head is a member of the Conference of Heads of Independent Schools in Zimbabwe (CHISZ).

MCC is a Christian school which teaches Creationism as well as Evolution but teaches students that creationism is what the school believes in and also encourages students to research on arguments against evolution. It also actively encourages conversion to Christianity on the part of its pupils.

MCC's campus provides both primary school education and a small Teacher Training Complex. The Teacher Training Programme was closed in 2014.Mcc

A notable ex-student who excelled in sport, David Pocock, he made a name for himself in rugby and Australian politics.

== See also ==
- List of schools in Zimbabwe
- List of boarding schools
