= St Killian's Mission =

Boarding school in Zimbabwe

Coordinates: 18.612°S 32.414°E

St Killian's Mission is a Carmelite boarding school near Rusape in the Manicaland Province in Zimbabwe. The School, governed by the Roman Catholic Church, is well known in the area for its philosophy of mixing moral education and academic education. The late Father Vernon was the head of the institution for over 25 years.

The school was founded after 1925 when local businessman Michael Jack Nyamusamba, a convert of the Trappist missionaries at Triashill gave "my kraal for a mission station with a European staff. The surrounding hundred acres, which I cultivated for the last ten years for their own use."
