= Dewure High School =

School in Gutu, Masvingo Province, Zimbabwe

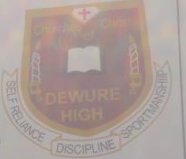

Location
- Dewure High School: Gutu, Masvingo; Post Office box: 73, Gutu; Gutu - Masvingo; Zimbabwe
- Coordinates: 17.7645277°S 31.0406769°E

Information
- Type: Mission, Boarding and Day school and school
- Motto: Self Reliance- Discipline -Sportsmanship
- Denomination: Churches of Christ
- Established: 1962
- Headmaster: Samuel Mahwehwe
- Forms: 1–6, Sixth Form
- Gender: Girls and boys
- Age: 12 to 19
- Enrollment: 1,470 (2022)
- Colors: Maroon and White
- Affiliations: Church of Christ in Zimbabwe

Dewure High School is a Christian secondary school in Gutu, Masvingo Province, Zimbabwe, affiliated with the Mashoko schools group, which comprises all primary and secondary schools run by the Churches of Christ in Zimbabwe. Zebedee Togarepi is the chairperson of the school.

== History ==
Dewure High School was established in 1966 by an American missionary couple named Martin Douglas ("Doug") Johnson and Frances C. Johnson.

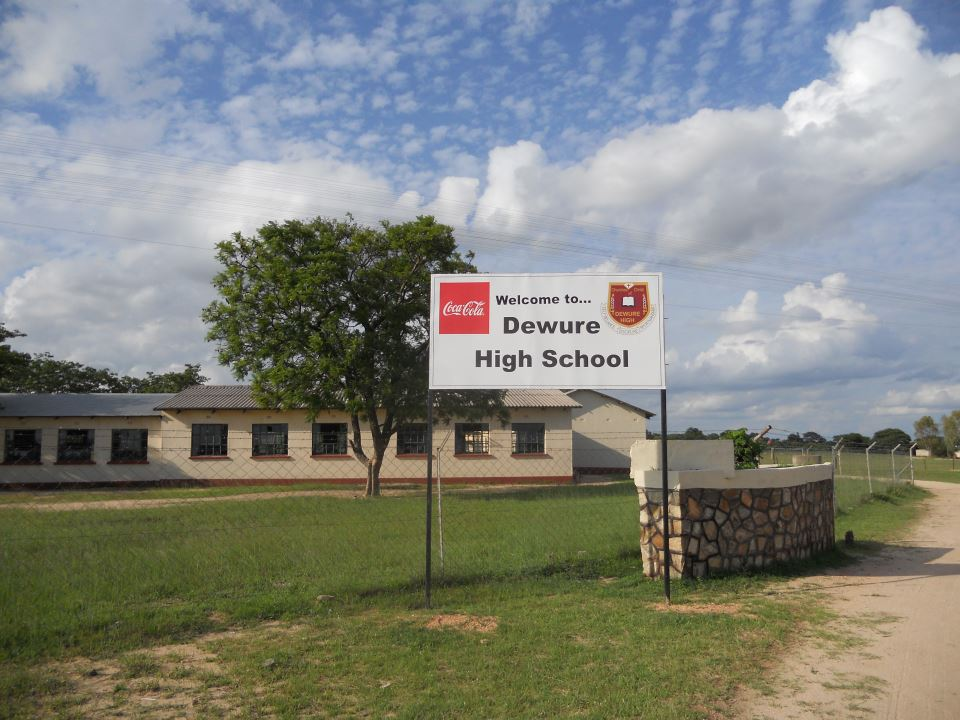
Dewure

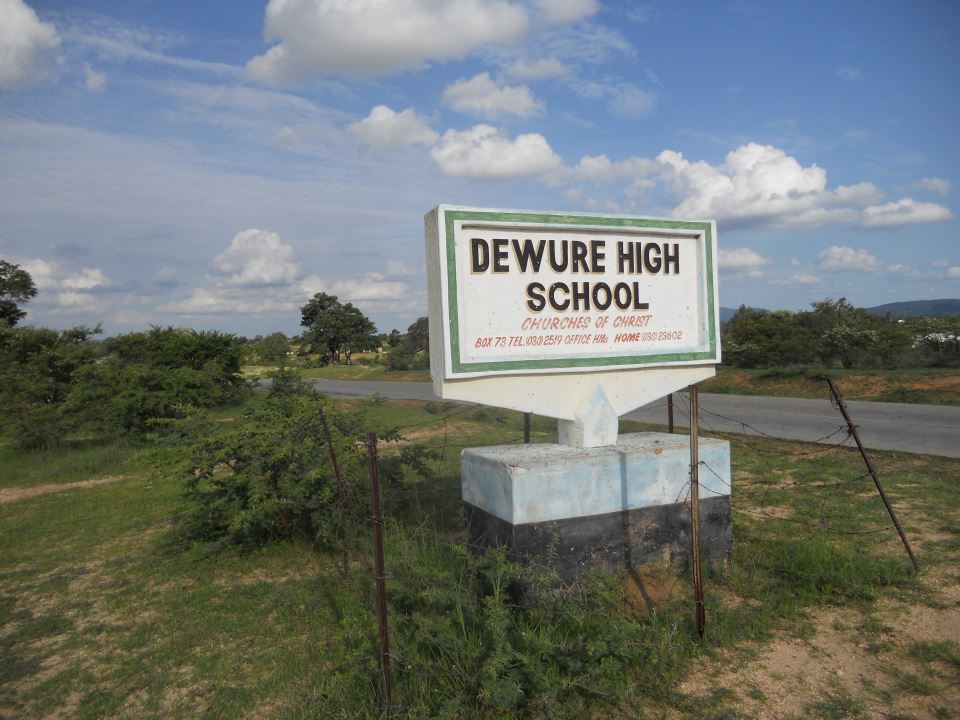
Church

== Subjects ==
Subjects offered include Mathematics, English Language & Literature, Sciences, Accounts, Practical Subjects such as Agriculture, Fashion and Fabrics, Shona, Technical Graphics, computer studies, biology, physics and chemistry. Dewure is ranked in the top 100 of the best schools in Zimbabwe with a pass rate of up to 95.

== Football ==
In 2004 Dewure began their reign to become football champions. They qualified for the NASH COCA COLA nationals after beating Gokomere in the Provincials. This marked the beginning of Dewure's reign as champions of Masvingo Province. In the following years they have won more than 15 trophies and tournaments including the Teacherz furnishers Trophy (5 times), Mash Nationals 2007, Coca-Cola National trophy 2008-2012-2015, and various local and provincial tournaments. They had become a menace to their long-time Provincial Rivals Pamushana High School.

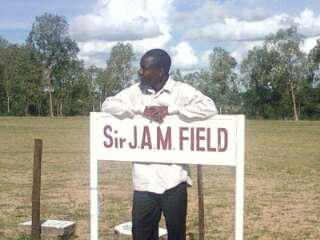
Soccer

== Recruitment ==
Form ones should have at most 12 units depending on the year.

== Teaching Staff ==
Dewure High head is Mr. Samuel Mahwehwe who took over after the retirement of Mr. John Ziki in 2012 after more than 30 years of loyal service to the school. Mahwehwe had been the acting head at Dewure since 2013 having assumed the position of deputy head in the same school in 2010.

The school is known for producing great results in Accounting and Economics at A level. O level History is also passed in numbers at the school.

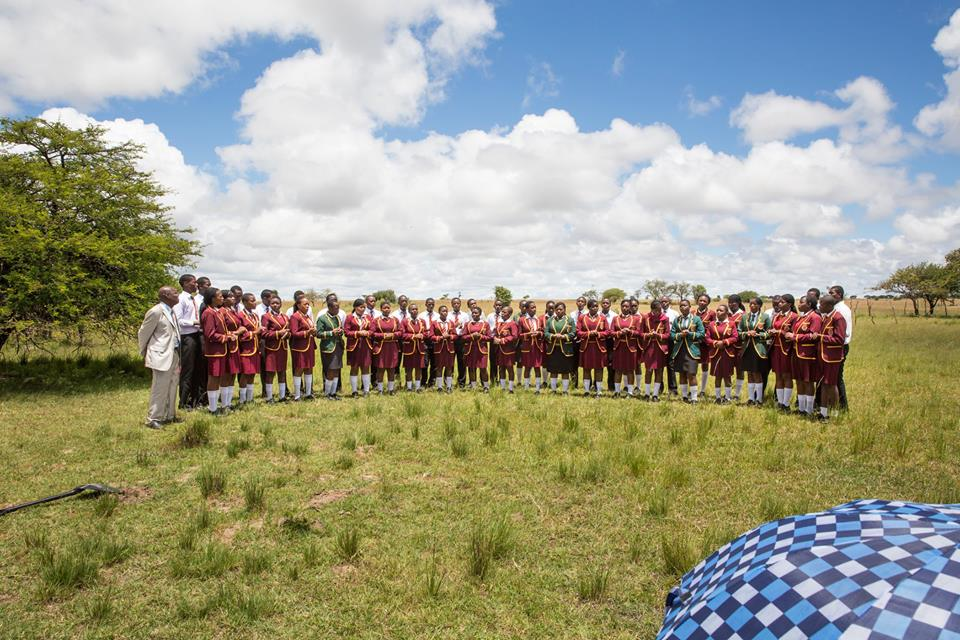
Staff
