= ZRP High School =

Location
- Borrowdale; Harare; 17.6972°S 31.0989°E

Information
- School type: Private
- Motto: Making Future Leaders
- Opened: 2003
- Founder: Augustine Chihuri
- School number: +263 4 860544
- Headmaster: Mr. Rinashe (2003–2006), Mr. Tarehwa (2007–2008), Mr. J. Chingonzoh (2008–2018), Mr. Mazhombwe (2018-2021) Mr Mutopa(2021-)
- Grades: Mixed
- Colours: Gold & blue
- National ranking: Top 10 Academics

Zimbabwe Republic Police High School, also called ZRP High School, is situated in Borrowdale Harare, Zimbabwe. This school was established in 2001 in the Hatcliffe neighborhood of Harare but officially opened its doors to the first batch of students on February 3, 2003. It is privately run by the Zimbabwe Republic Police, making it a private school.

The school was set up by the then-Commissioner of Police, Augustine Chihuri, as a means to curb the inconveniences to children of police when their parents are transferred to a different province. Despite it being built to mainly cater for police children, it is also open to non-police force members' children. However, school fees are pegged differently for both groups, with the latter paying close to double of the former considering their parents contributed towards the construction of the school through deductions from salaries. This is the first and only Zimbabwe Republic Police High School.

On February 3, 2003, the school opened its doors to the first batch of students, with just under 100 students being enrolled and all being in Form 1. This was mainly because construction was still on-going and the resources were not yet adequate to cater for a full batch of students. These students had six teachers (all who were civilians) with each taking two subjects each. Basic infrastructure had been set up and a lot of improvisation took place to make sure that the students were properly cared for and received the best education possible. The headmaster was Mr. Rinashe, who was coming from St. Augustine's. The deputy was Mr. Muzhanye, who was also the history and geography teacher, and the Senior Lady was Mrs. Kundeya who was also the English and Shona teacher. The rest of the teaching staff included: Mr Munzverengwi for computers and agriculture, Mr. Majilana (late) for science and maths, and Mr. Muzuwa for technical graphics and principles of accounts. Later on Mrs. Maguta joined the team and took over in geography and shona. Towards the end of that year, a batch of students were chosen to be prefects who would later become school prefects for the next four years till they completed their O Level studies.

The year 2004 saw the enrollment of a new batch of students, thus offering form 1 and form 2 education. With this increase, staff also needed to be increased, therefore more teachers were recruited to accommodate the growing number of classes. This was a process that continued until 2008, which is when it became a full house, with students starting Form 1 up to Form 6.

After the death of Headmaster Mr. Rinashe in October 2005, Mr. Muzhanye became Acting Headmaster until 2006 when Mr. Tarehwa, a former Head at St Ignatius took over.

The year 2006 saw the first batch of students take their Ordinary Level examinations with slightly over 100 candidates registering to write. The school registered a 98% pass rate, thus making it the best performing school in Harare, and one of the top in the country. Four candidates recorded a result of 'nine'. Owing to inadequate equipment, the school had to improvise a lot, which saw the first batch of A Level students struggle, particularly in science. They had to make do with the little that was available for experiments. However, this did not stop the candidates from performing well and saw them record a 92% pass rate during the 2008 A Level examinations, making ZRP High School one of the top performing schools in the country, a title which they still proudly hold to date.
