= Mabvuku High School =

High school in the Mabvuku suburb of Harare, Zimbabwe

Coordinates: 17.837°S 31.188°E

Information
- Established: 1975; 50 years ago
- Gender: Mixed

Mabvuku High School is a high school in the Mabvuku suburb of Harare, Zimbabwe.

The school is co-educational for all forms up to A Level students. It opened in 1975 and is one of three schools in Mabvuku offering A level. Mabvuku High School introduced A level in 1988. The current headmaster is Mr Mbirimi and deputy Mr S Marangwanda. The school also carries evening studies.

Mabvuku High School is also known for its A level dance and music group called the Vabvuwi, named after the popular Methodist Church Vabvuwi musical group. The school holds a yearly event called the Arts Night, with live band performances, marimba, dance and drama. Athlete Marshal Munetsi, who is currently in the French league, attended the school.
