= Glen View 1 High School =

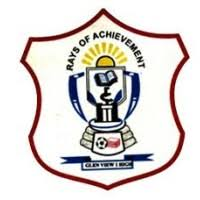

Location
- 9286 First Drive Way, Glen View, Harare; Zimbabwe
- Coordinates: 17.902674°S 30.944186°E

Information
- Type: Public, day and secondary education institution
- Motto: Rays of Achievements
- Religious affiliation: none(but more like Christianity)
- Established: 1984; 42 years ago
- Founder: Ministry of Primary and Secondary Education
- Sister school: Glen View 2 High School
- Headmaster: Alois Maronga Deputy heads. = Happymore Mapa, Joseph Matambanadzo
- Forms: Form 1-2 (ZJC) (Grade 8-9 equiv.); Form 3-4 (Ordinary Level) (Grade 10-11 equiv.); Form 5-6 (Advanced Level) (Grade 12-13 equiv.)
- Gender: Male, Female
- Enrollment: 5,000 est.(2015); 3,100 est. (2023)
- Campus: Suburban
- Colours: Khaki; Blue; White; Maroon; Gray; Gold
- Nickname: High 1
- Affiliations: GlenView-Mufakose District

Glen View 1 Secondary School, formerly known as Glen View 1 High School, is a government owned public school located in Glen View, Harare, Zimbabwe. It is widely considered to be the largest school in Zimbabwe in terms of population, with an estimated 5,000 students. It built a multi-purpose court for US$3 million which houses netball, basketball, tennis and volleyball. Alois Maronga is the headmaster of the school, he is subject to controversy when he attacked 94 students for non-payment of school fees
