= St. Bernard's High School (Bulawayo, Zimbabwe) =

Catholic secondary school in Zimbabwe

Coordinates: 20.1431°S 28.4842°E

Location
- Bulawayo; Zimbabwe

Information
- Religious affiliation(s): Roman Catholicism
- Established: 1965

St. Bernard's High School, Bulawayo is a Catholic school located in Pumula, a high density suburb of Bulawayo, Zimbabwe. One of its founding teachers and principals, Sister Ignatius Julie of the Sisters of Notre Dame de Namur, died in 1995. She was the school principal at the time of her death. St. Bernard's High School started running A-Level courses in 2004. The school relies on its Christian foundation to balance the academic and religious growth of its students. Its motto is "Prayer and hard work lead to success."
