= Howard High School, Mazowe =

School in Zimbabwe

Howard High School

Location
- Howard High School, Private Bag 230 Glendale; Zimbabwe

Information
- Type: Private; Boarding; Leadership; Secondary Education
- Motto: Godliness and Good Learning
- Religious affiliation: Christian
- Established: 1923; 103 years ago
- Founder: Major James Barker and Captain Leonard Kirby (Salvation Army)
- Sister school: Bradley High School; Mazowe High School; Usher Girls High School; Langham Girls High; Chipindura High School
- Oversight: Ministry of Primary and Secondary Education
- Headmaster: Mr P. Dera (2012 - current); Mr S. Kaungwa (2005 - 2011); Mr L.D. Jumo (1997 - unknown); Mr T.N. Ndoro (1996 - 1997); Mr R. Chitsika (1994 - 1996); Mr P.T. Mashonganyika (1991 - 1994); Mr R.V. Kanyepi (1986 - 1991); Mr Mutema (1982 - 1986); Mr F. Mbirimi (1980 - 1981); Mr L. Tsikirai (1978 - 1979)
- Gender: Male (46%), Female (64%)
- Enrollment: ~900
- Campus: Rural
- Houses: Falcon; Osprey; Harrier; Hawk
- Colours: Sky Blue, Navy Blue, Grey, and White
- Mascot: Eagle
- Affiliations: Salvation Army Schools Association; National Association of Secondary Heads

Howard High School, Zimbabwe is a Salvation Army private boarding school located 94 kilometres Northeast of Harare in Glendale, Zimbabwe.

== History ==
Howard High School was founded in 1923 by Major James Barker and Captain Leonard Kirby of the Salvation Army as the Howard Institute. The school was started when the educational facility that was at Pearson Farm was moved to Nyachuru in the Chiweshe Communal Lands Approximately 90 km north of what was then Salisbury (now Harare). The new mission was built on over 100 acres of land granted by the British South Africa Company and named after the Salvation Army's second Chief of Staff, T. Henry Howard who died in 1923. Howard Institute would become the Salvation Army's primary education center in Southern Rhodesia, with a "Practicing School" where student teachers could practice in a classroom. The Howard Institute comprised:

- A combined Central Primary School with boarding section
- Theological Training School for Salvation Army Officers
- Howard Hospital (opened in 1928)
- Teacher Training School (established by Captain Thomas Lewis in 1933)
- Nurses Training School (which began in 1939).

The Teacher Training School and Nurses Training School were eventually converted later on to become a Vocational Training College focusing on equipping young people within the community with practical life skills.

== Sports ==
The Howard High School Handball team made their debut international handball tournament at the Umlazi Invitational Tournament Durban, South Africa from 3–5 December 2012.

The Howard Handball Team proceeded to the Partille Cup, Sweden in July 2013 where it represented Zimbabwe in the U16 category.

Other Notable Sports

Howard High Schools offers a wide range of sporting activities such as:

- Soccer (Football)
- Basketball
- Volleyball
- Track Athletics
- Field Athletics (Jumps and Throws)
- Netball
- Cross Country

== Clubs & Societies ==
Howard High School offers a wide range of clubs and societies in addition to sporting activities. Each student is required to be a member of at least one club or society.

Students get to choose from a range of clubs inclusive of Chess, Choir, Brass band, Youth Against AIDS, Debate Society, Public Speaking Society, Hair Dressing, Driving School, Table Tennis, Art Club, Friends of the Environment, Toastmasters, LEOS and Junior Achievers Zimbabwe.

== Notable alumni ==
=== Politicians ===
- Joseph Wilfred Msika, a Zimbabwean politician who served as Vice President of Zimbabwe from 1999 to 2009.
- Joyce "Teurai-Ropa" Mujuru, former Vice-President of Zimbabwe
- Solomon Mutsvairo, the songwriter and composer of the Zimbabwe National Anthem
- Vitalis Maronjesi, a political activist and the current Harare Province Chairperson for Zimbabwe National Students' Union (ZINASU).

=== Musicians ===
- Shalom Charamba, a Zimbabwean gospel musician and daughter to the popular Pastor Charles and Mai Olivia Charamba. She released her debut single "Mbiri Yose" in 2020.
- Eternity Charamba, a Zimbabwean gospel musician, daughter to Pastor Charles and Mai Olivia Charamba and sister to Shalom Charamba. She released her debut single "Tonamata" in 2020 right about the same time as her sister, Shalom released her debut single.

=== Academics ===
- Dr. Blessing Duri, a world renowned Coaching Expert, Mentor and Founder of the International Coaching and Mentoring Foundation.

=== Other Notable Alumni ===
- Eva Burrows, the second female and world's first youngest General of the Salvation Army Church in 1986.
- Vida Victoria Mungwira was the first African woman to become a doctor from the Federation of Rhodesia and Nyasaland.
