= Cranborne Boys High School =

School in Harare, Zimbabwe

Coordinates: 17.8563°S 31.0786°E

Cranborne Boys High School is a day high school located in Cranborne, an eastern suburb of Harare, Zimbabwe. It is an all-boys school established on a former British RAF base.

The schools motto is "Nitamur ad caelum" which is Latin for "taking to the sky". Its sister school is Hatfield Girls High School which is located in Hatfield, Harare. The headmaster of the school is Mr Masenga.

== Buildings ==
=== Main block ===
Caters for the form one to form four category and also holds the senior masters' office.

=== Advanced level block ===
As the name suggests, the block caters only for the advanced level pupils studying for A-Levels, with no O-Level pupils allowed.

=== Laboratories ===
This block stands adjacent to the main block. It contains one senior and four junior laboratories.

=== Technical block ===
For the technical subjects offered by the school

- Technical graphics
- Metal work
- Wood work
- Art

=== Hall and gym & kitchen ===
These stand joined together; the gym has an indoor basketball court and hockey ground.

== Grounds ==
The school has 4 grounds referred to as fields.

- The Rugby field (John Brown Field)
- The Soccer field
- The Cricket field
- The Volleyball Court
- Baseball Field
- Field Hockey
- Athletics Field
- Hand ball

== Sport ==
The school offers a wide variety of sporting disciplines, including soccer, cricket, basketball, hockey, swimming, table tennis, athletics, volleyball, squash, baseball and rugby.
