= Allan Wilson High School =

Top Boys School in Harare, Mashonaland, Zimbabwe

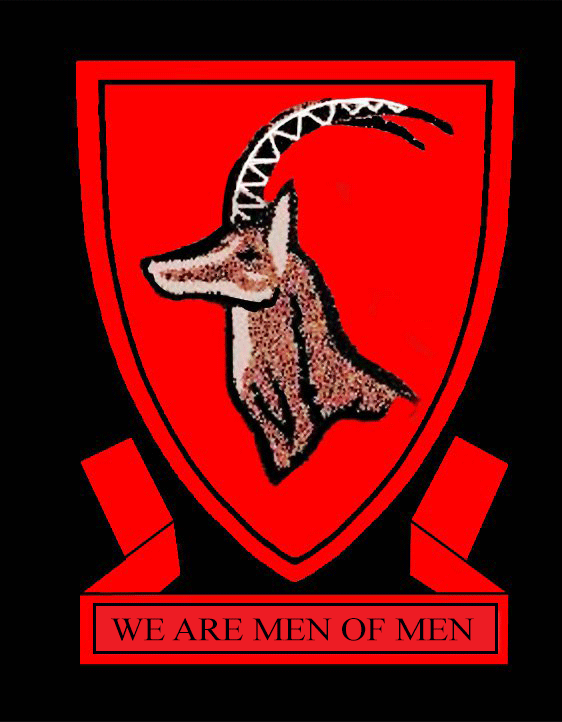
- Allan Wilson Badge

Location
- Harare, Mashonaland; Zimbabwe; 17.77015°S 31.01076°E

Information
- Motto: "We are Men of Men"
- Denomination: non-denominated
- Founded: 1940
- Authority: Government / Public School
- Gender: Boys Only
- Average class size: 47 pupils (2013 average)
- Classes offered: Form 1 to Upper 6 ['A' level]
- Language: English & Shona
- Houses: 6 Sporting Houses Day Scholar Houses-Colour-Mascot: Red (colonial name Wellington); Yellow (colonial name Newton); Green - Bear (colonial name Browning); Blue - Shumba (colonial name Scott); Boarding Houses/Day Scholar-Colour-Mascot: White - Road Runner (colonial name Shangani); Bulldog (colonial name Burnham - Lilac)
- Colours: Black, Red and White
- Slogan: Sables the rare species
- Sports: Rugby, Field Hockey, Football (Soccer), Tennis, Cricket, Water Polo, Basketball, Swimming, Athletics,
- Mascot: Sable Antelope
- Nickname: AWS (A-Dub, usually shortened to Dub)
- Team name: Sables
- Newspaper: Sable News Network (SNN)

Allan Wilson High School is a boys' high school in Harare, Zimbabwe, named after British Army officer Allan Wilson. Wilson led the Shangani Patrol in the First Chimurenga (war) against the people of Matabeleland. He died in that war near Shangani River, defending Rhodesians who were fighting to colonise Zimbabwe.

The school shares a boundary fence/wall with Prince Edward School to the north and Harare Polytechnic to the south.

== History ==
The school was founded in 1940 after running for 25 years as a hospital for the white minority that had colonised then-Rhodesia. Its sister school is Queen Elizabeth Girls' High School, which was founded in the same year. The school war cry is "Umkhulubafana, dzi, Izichesuzubaba, dzi, klahba, vimba, khosa, duma, zha, zhavella, Allan Wilson, waah. It was founded as a "modern general secondary school," and originally did not offer public examinations. This changed in 1952 when it was accorded the status of "technical high school," and named Allan Wilson Technical Boys' High School. Between 1952 and 1974, the school was academically selective and taught a mainly technical and scientific curriculum. From 1974, the curriculum was broadened, and the school offered a comprehensive range of subjects.

Historically, the school offered College of Preceptors 'O' level and 'A' level examinations under the auspices of the Oxford Examination Board and Associated Examining Board, later by the University of Cambridge Local Examination Syndicate UCLES, and also as a collaborative effort with the University of Zimbabwe.

== Modern developments ==
The school motto was originally "They were Men of Men" in homage to the Allan Wilson's Shangani Patrol, who lost their lives to Lobengula's men at Shangani in 1893 during the First Matebele War. With Zimbabwean independence, and a feeling that the motto had lost its relevancy, staff and students chose the motto "We are Men of Men" as a reflection of the sentiment of the time.

Since 1988, 'O' and 'A' Level curricula have revolved around the Zimbabwe Schools Examination Council (ZIMSEC) protocol of 'O' Level and 'A' LEVEL examinations. O-Levels are written after the first four years of high school, at the end of Form IV (Year 11). A-Levels after the last 2 years of school, in Form VI (Year 13).

The school enrollment and staff changed from predominantly white to predominantly blacks, accurately reflecting the country's demographics.

== Notable alumni ==
- Phillimon Hanneck, athlete.
- David Lowe, swimmer.
