= Mufakose Number 2 High School =

High School in Mufakose, Harare, Zimbabwe

Mufakose Number 2 High School, also known as Mufakose High 2 or Mufakose 2 High School, is a secondary school in Zimbabwe which is located in a Harare suburb called Mufakose. Mufakose is to the west of Harare City Centre and lies north of the Harare to Bulawayo railway line. Mufakose Number 2 High School caters for school children aged between 12 and 17 years. This school was established in 1982, immediately after the independence of Zimbabwe in 1980. Use of English language is compulsory at all times whilst within the school grounds....

Mufakose Number 2 High School has a hot sitting arrangement whereby some of the children attend classes from 7.00 a.m to 12 noon whilst others attend classes from 12.30 p.m to 5.00 p.m. Usually those in their first year of secondary school, called Form 1 and those in third year of secondary school, in Form 3 attend classes in the afternoon. Those in their second and fourth year of secondary school, in Form 3 and 4 respectively, attend classes in the morning.

Mufakose Number 2 High School uniform comprises maroon short, beige shirts, maroon tie, maroon socks and brown shoes for boys in Form 1 and 2. Form 1 and 2 girls wear checked maroon and white dresses, maroon socks and brown shoes. Form 3 and 4 boys wear grey trousers instead of maroon shorts whilst Form 3 and 4 girls wear maroon skirts, beige shirts, maroon ties, maroon socks and brown shoes. Maroon school blazers should be worn by all school children.

Lower and Upper six classes, Form 5 and Form 6 respectively, were introduced recently to cater to advanced students.

Students must participate in at least one sport. Sports at the school include: - Soccer - Lawn tennis - Hockey - Cricket - Rugby - Netball - Chess - Volleyball - Table tennis - Basketball - Athletics

At Mufakose 2 High School every student must also take part in at least one of the clubs offered at the school: - Karate - Justice for Children Trust (JCT) - Quiz Club - Debate - First Aid - Interaction - Chess - Scripture Union - Choir - Drama - Dance - Marimba

At Mufakose 2 High, each student is initiated in one of four houses: Shumba, Mhofu, Ingwe and Nyati. These Houses battle each other in sports, drama, choir and public speaking during the first term of the year. The school volleyball team has competed at a national level. Recently rugby has been introduced, and the team has competed at festivals like the Dairyboard Rugby Festival with schools such as Churchill and Prince Edward.

The school has a prefect body that consists of approximately 60 students taken from form 3, 4 and Upper 6 students. Among the sixty is the prefects and school representative body consisting of 8 students normally taken from students in their final year. The current headmistress is Mrs Kusotera.

== Notable former members of staff & students ==
1. Ramson Zhuwawo - Zimbabwe national team football player, played for AmaZulu F.C. in South Africa from 2010 to 2013
2. Royland Magwira - best athlete 2001, from Nyati House.
