= Zimbabwe School Examinations Council =

Zimbabwe's local examination board

- Abbreviation: ZIMSEC
- Formation: 2024
- Type: Parastatal; Examination board
- Headquarters: Upper East Road, Mount Pleasant; Harare, Zimbabwe
- Coordinates: 17°47′11.456″S 31°2′38.65″E
- Region served: Zimbabwe
- Website: www.zimsec.co.zw

The Zimbabwe School Examinations Council (ZIMSEC) is an autonomous parastatal under the Ministry of Education, Sports and Culture of the Republic of Zimbabwe, responsible for the administration of public examinations in Zimbabwean schools. Its syllabuses were evaluated by the National Academic Recognitiation Centre (NARIC) in the United Kingdom, and found to be equivalent to the General Certificate Of Education Standard offered in the United Kingdom, Australia, New Zealand, United States of America and the other English-speaking countries, hence the internationally recognised qualifications conferred by the Council.

== History ==
The table below shows the brief history of ZIMSEC.

Brief Historical Background
Date	Event/Occasion Summary
1983	Cabinet decision to localise Ordinary Level and Advanced Level examinations
1984	Training of the first lot of markers
November 1990	First localised Ordinary Level examination written
1994	Zimbabwe School Examinations Council Act (ZIMSEC ACT 1994) was passed by the Parliament.
1995	Completion of the localisation of the Ordinary Level examination.
October 1995	The first ZIMSEC Board was appointed.
November 1995	Birth of ZIMSEC under an Interim Director.
1 July 1996	First substantive ZIMSEC Director appointed.
1 November 1996	Former Examinations Branch staff joined ZIMSEC after the abolition from Public Service.
November 2002	First ZIMSEC Advanced Level examination being written.
2003	Completion of the localisation of Advanced Level examinations.

== Qualifications ==
The following qualifications are offered by ZIMSEC:

- for primary education
  - ZIMSEC Grade Seven Certificate, awarded after sitting for Grade Seven (Year Seven) examinations.
- for secondary education
  - ZIMSEC General Certificate of Education Ordinary Level (commonly referred to as "O-Levels"), this is for individuals doing the 2 year GCE O-Levels subject-based course beginning in Form 3 to Form 4 (i.e. Year 10 and 11)
  - ZIMSEC General Certificate of Education Advanced Level (commonly referred to as "A-Levels"), this is the school leaving qualification conferred by the Council to pupils completing secondary or pre-university education.
