= Education in Zimbabwe =

Educational oversight
- Ministry of Primary and Secondary Education Ministry of Tertiary and Higher Education: Dr. Tonderayi Moyo; Amon Murwira

National education budget (2013)
- Budget: $750 million (public, all levels)

General details
- Primary languages: English, Shona, Ndebele
- System type: State
- Established Initiated: 17 October 1982; 4 May 1980

Literacy (2023)
- Total: 90.7%
- Male: 91.0%
- Female: 89.1%

Enrollment (2023)
- Total: 4 659,993
- Primary: 93.9%
- Secondary: 73.8%
- Post secondary: 10 %

Zimbabwe is located in the southern region of Africa.

Education in Zimbabwe under the jurisdiction of the Ministry of Primary and Secondary Education for primary and secondary education, and the Ministry of Higher and Tertiary Education, Science and Technology Development for higher education. Both are regulated by the Cabinet of Zimbabwe. The education system in Zimbabwe encompasses 13 years of primary and secondary school and runs from January to December. The school year is a total of 40 weeks with three terms and a month break in-between each term.

In 1980, education was declared a basic human right by Robert Mugabe, the leader of the ZANU party, which changed the constitution to recognize primary and secondary public education as free and compulsory. One of Zimbabwe's Millennium Development Goals was to achieve universal education for all students; however, the goal was not achieved as of 2015 due to a public health crisis, economic downturn and inability to afford costs associated with education. The country is currently working toward the Sustainable Development Goal of providing universal and free education to all students by 2030. Zimbabwe had an adult literacy rate of 88% in 2014.

Despite education being recognised as a basic human right in Zimbabwe, in 2017, the Zimbabwean Government did only 77.2% of what was possible at its income level to ensure that the right to education was being fulfilled, categorically, the government's ability to fulfil this right as "bad". This data is collected by the Human Rights Measurement Initiative. The initiative also breaks down the right to education by calculating Primary and Secondary School Enrolment. Keeping Zimbabwe's income level in mind, Zimbabwe is doing only 61.9% of what should be possible at its income level for secondary school enrolment and 92.4 percent for primary school enrolment.

== History ==
=== Colonial government to 1980 ===
The British South Africa Company arrived in the 1890s to Rhodesia, the area now known as Zimbabwe, Malawi and Zambia. The Company administration of Rhodesia created Christian missionary schools to serve local communities. Missionary schools provided an education for the indigenous population that focused on agricultural production and industrial development including carpentry and building. N.J. Atkinson claims that in order to control the local population, the Company limited education and censored knowledge in schools. Furthermore, he argues that the eurocentric education system was a structural institution that reinforced the superiority of White settlers even though, they were the minority of the population. Missionary schools perpetuated social and economic repression of the indigenous population by reducing their chances of earning well-paying jobs or positions of power. Rugare Mapako claims education to Africans offered limited academic and foundational skills in order to promote labor exploitation and indentured servitude. Limited access to a quality education kept Africans subordinate and inferior to White colonists in order to advance British political and economic gains.

Due to large investments in education by the Southern Rhodesian government prior to 1960, Europeans were disproportionately funded more for education than the majority African population because the Rhodesian government controlled access to quality schools based on race, prejudice and ethnicity. Segregation of schools based on funding was most extreme in the 1970s because Europeans only represented a few per cent of Zimbabwe's population, but were allocated slightly less than half of government spending on education. Funding secondary school was also disproportionally offered to Europeans rather than Africans. In the 1970s, only 43.5% of African children attended school, while only 3.9% of these children enrolled in secondary school.

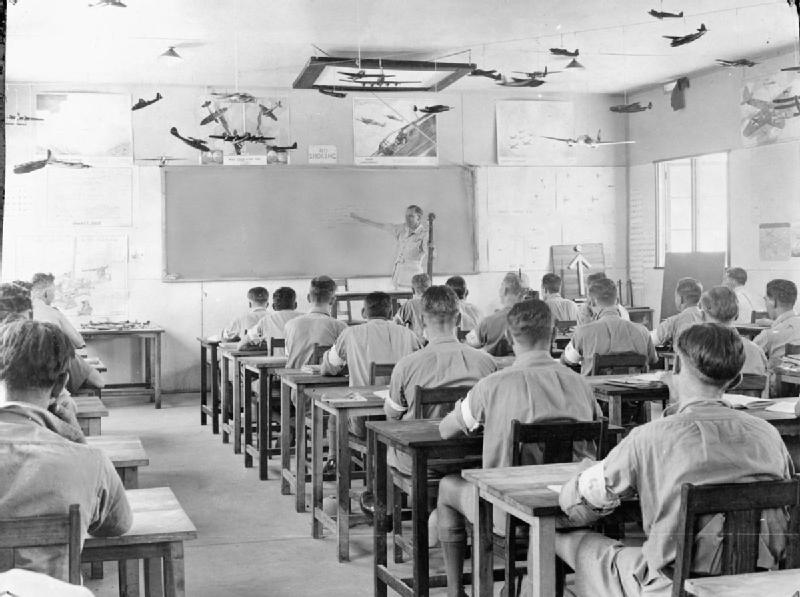
Training of Royal Air Force Aircrew in Rhodesia, 1943. This is an example of the focus on White education during colonial rule until 1980.

=== Schedule in Zimbabwe ===
During the colonial era in Zimbabwe (then known as Southern Rhodesia), the education system was heavily modeled after the British curriculum. The subjects offered depended largely on the type of school, with a significant divide between schools for European settlers and those for the African population. Here are the primary subjects taught during that period:

==== Core Academic Subjects ====
1. English Language & Literature:
2. Mathematics:
3. History:
4. Geography:
5. Science:
6. Latin:
7. Scripture / Religious Instruction:

==== Practical & Vocational Subjects ====
In many schools—particularly those for the African population—the British administration emphasized "industrial" or manual training over high-level academics:

1. Agriculture:
2. Woodwork & Metalwork:
3. Domestic Science (Home Economics):
4. Physical Training (PT):

=== Revolution in Rhodesia ===
In 1979, the new government of Zimbabwe Rhodesia called for an education reform that created a three-tier school system. The Education Act of 1979 regulated access to each type of school through a zoning system based on residency. Before the act, Zimbabwe's education system was divided between African and European schools. After the shift in policy and leadership the education system split into government schools, community schools and private schools. Government schools were also split into three divisions called Group A, B and C. White students historically attended Group A schools that offered highly trained teachers and a quality education. These schools were located in white suburbs that denied housing opportunities for Africans, reinforcing segregation based on ethnicity and race. Group B schools required a low-fee payment and C schools did not require a fee beyond educational materials. Both were only available for African students. Group B and C schools had less resources, funding and qualified faculty compared to Group A schools.

=== National education reform in 1980 ===
The Rhodesian Bush War from 1964-1979, a fifteen-year guerrilla war, catalysed the shift in power from British colonial rule to de jure sovereignty in 1980. The ZANU party, Zimbabwe African National Union, won the national election in 1980 and took over the historic White minority government in Rhodesia. The ZANU party democratised education by promising free and compulsory primary and secondary education to all children in Zimbabwe. The party's claims were backed by the national constitution, which recognises education as a basic human right. All primary school tuition fees were abolished after independence. Dr. Dzingai Mutumbuka was elected the Minister of Education to support Zimbabwe through another education reform and to keep students in school. His leadership changed the climate of the education system because the Ministry of Education focused on fostering self-sufficient students that are productive, motivated and dedicated citizens. The government allocated 17.3% of the total national budget toward education. This was politically considered an "education miracle" as cited by scholar Clayton Mackenzie. Ultimately, Zimbabwe's education system reform was to ensure equal access to education by providing primary and secondary education to all children.

=== 1980s and 1990s ===
Public expenditure on education in Southern Africa as a share of GDP, 2012 or closest year. Source: UNESCO Science Report: towards 2030 (2015)

Since independence, the government focused on providing equal and free education for all through the rapid expansion of education resources to keep up with the demand. Within one year, the education system nearly doubled the number of students it served from 885,801 students to 1,310,315 students in primary and secondary education. Exponential increases in the number of students attending school heightened the need for more infrastructure and teachers.

Teachers were in high demand immediately following Zimbabwe's independence. In the mid-1980s, thousands of refugee children from Mozambique emigrated to Zimbabwe, increasing the number of children attending public schools and demand for teachers. The Minister of Education brought in teachers from Australia, Britain and Canada for a short period of time to fill the teaching gaps. Schools expanded their human resources to serve as many children as possible with limited infrastructure by practicing "hot-seating," also known as double session schooling. "Hot-seating" is the practice of offering class in the morning to half of the students and in the afternoon to the other half. "Hot-seating" was still not enough to meet the demands of the population; therefore, the Ministry of Education expanded teacher education colleges rapidly by providing "on-the-spot" teacher training. In 1986, 8,000 additional teachers were trained to meet national demands.

Communities also rapidly built more infrastructure for education. For example, from 1979-1984, the number of primary schools in operation increased by 73.3% and the number of secondary schools increased by 537.8%. Despite the challenges following the magnitude of students to educate, Zimbabwe claimed to achieve universal primary education by the end of the 1980s. By the 1990s, primary schooling was nearly universal and over half the population had completed secondary education.

UNICEF claims that the country's education system was once the most developed on the continent, although the system continues to suffer from a contemporary decline in public funding linked to hyperinflation and economic mismanagement. A decrease in GDP by 40% from 2000-2008 marked a period of economic downturn in the first decade of the twenty-first century. Social expenditures on health and education also decreased by more than half.

By the end of 2008, most schools and hospitals were shut down due to thousands of teachers leaving the profession, an economic crisis, an increase in HIV and AIDS, and an outbreak of cholera in 2008 leading to a national epidemic. UNICEF asserted that 94 percent of rural schools, serving the majority of the population, closed in 2009. During this period of time UNICEF also claimed that attendance rates plummeted from over 80% to 20%. The economy regained momentum after 2009 once the Government of National Unity was formed. This is an inclusionary government developed to resolve national challenges. The Government of National Unity suspended the Zimbabwe currency to implement full dollarization, reducing hyperinflation and increasing social expenditures.

Zimbabwe's focus on expanding education opportunities for the past 25 years has led to national accomplishments including achieving a literacy rate comparable to other Africa countries at 51% from ages 15 to 24. As of 2014, 3,120,000 students were enrolled in primary and secondary education and 76% of these students were enrolled in primary education.

As of early 2020s, the education system has been reported to be grossly underfunded.

== Governance after independence ==
=== Non-discriminatory policies ===
After nearly a century of British colonial rule, the Zimbabwe African National Union took over Zimbabwe and formed an independent country in 1980. The newly formed government created free and compulsory primary and secondary education, valuing education as a fundamental right. This fundamental right was clearly articulated in the Education Act of 1987. The act also abolished all methods of discrimination from the Education Act of 1979.

The Education Act of 1996 and the Disabled Persons Act of 1996 furthered nondiscriminatory policy by requiring that "all students, regardless of race, religion, gender, creed, and disability, have access to basic or primary education (up to Grade 7)." These nondiscrimination provisions expanded the right to education in Zimbabwe for all students, including students with disabilities.

=== Decentralization of authority ===
The Education Act of 2006 established School Development Committees. These committees are overseen and established by the School Parents Assembly for parents and guardians of school-going children to participate in the development of Zimbabwe's schools. According to the government's Statutory Instrument 87 of 1992, the purpose of School Development Committees is to:

- provide and assist in the operation and development of public schools
- advance the moral, cultural, physical and intellectual welfare of students
- promote the welfare of the school for the benefit of its present and future students and their parents and teachers

School Development Committees have many functions to control the quality of the school system. Their powers include the recruitment and dismissal of teachers, the preservation of facilities and the act of borrowing money and applying for grants. These committees also decentralized the education system by enabling parents to elect five other parents to lead a school. The decentralization of schools combats the highly centralized structure of the government in hopes to assist the operation and development of education.

=== Education ministries ===
In 2013, the government created the Ministry of Education, Sport, Arts and Culture to foster social cohesion, economic empowerment and educational development in primary and secondary schools. The Minister of the Ministry of Education, Sport, Arts and Culture was Andrew Langa until President Mugabe fired Langa in September 2015. Langa was replaced by Makhosini Hlongwan and the ministry's name changed to Ministry of Sports and Recreation as of 2015.

Currently, government primary and secondary schools are run by the Ministry of Primary and Secondary Education (MoPSE) and non-government schools are run by local authorities including churches and non-profit organizations. The Minister of the Ministry of Primary and Secondary Education is Evelyn Ndlovu as of 2021. The Ministry of Higher and Tertiary Education, Science and Technology Development (MoHTES&TD) oversees public and private universities and technical and teacher education.

== Education stages ==
=== Early education ===
Preschools are directed by the Early Childhood Development (ECD) system under the Ministry of Primary and Second Education. Early childhood education is offered for children from the ages of three to five through the ECD. According to United Nations and the Southern and Eastern Africa Consortium for Monitoring Educational Quality, Zimbabwe is prioritizing and expanding Early Childhood Development by offering early childhood education at primary schools. These programs are currently available in mostly urban areas and can be owned by the government, organizations or individuals. In fact, 98 percent of primary schools have ECD centers for ages four to five and 60 percent of primary schools have ECD centers for ages three to four with trained teachers.

=== Primary education ===
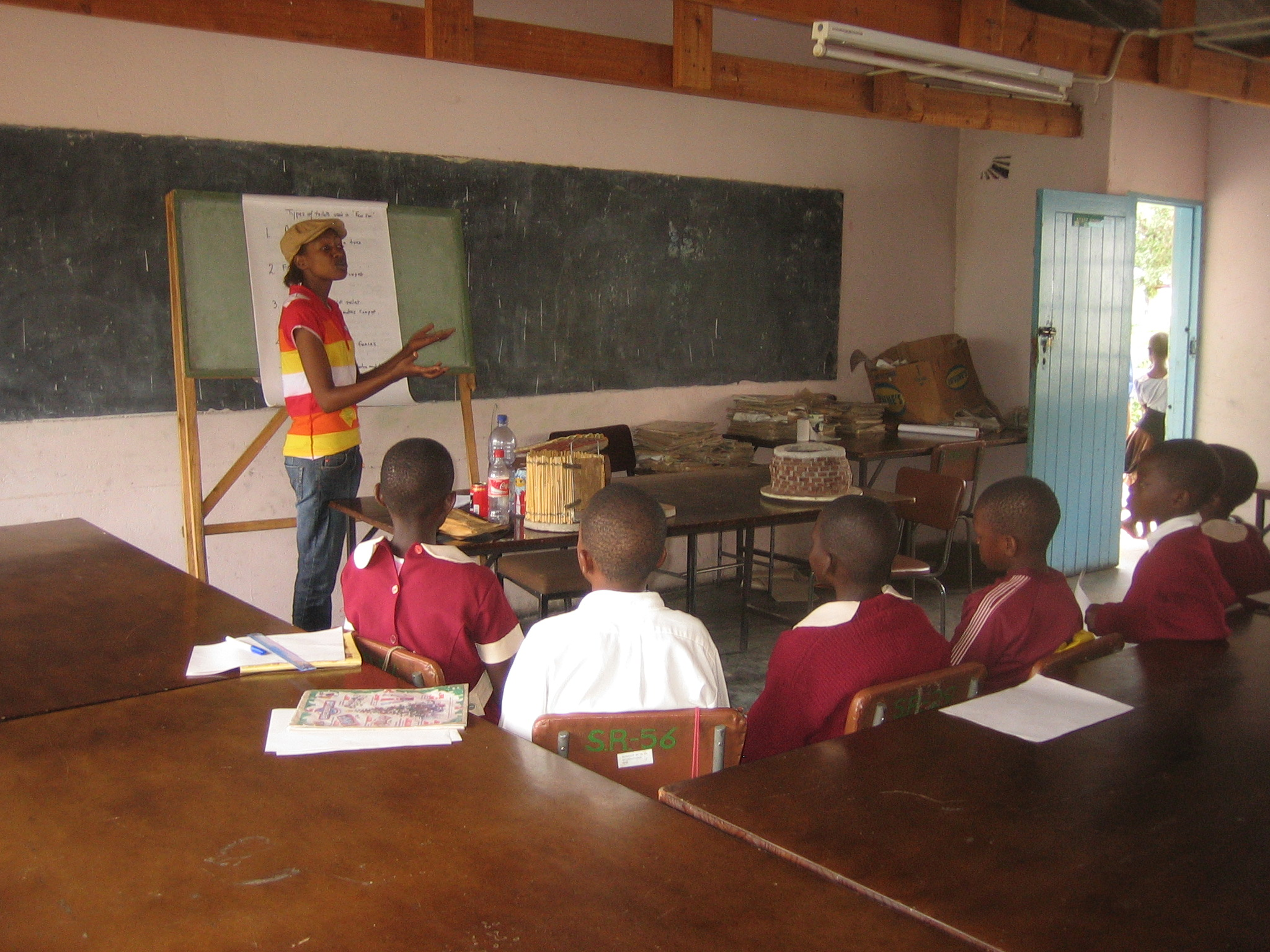
Primary school classroom and lecture in Zimbabwe.

Zimbabwe's education system mandates seven years of primary school, encompassing Grades 1 to 7. Urban primary schools teach in English. Rural primary schools teach students in their local native language, typically in Shona or Ndebele, then transition to English by Grade 3. Student to teacher ratios are typically from 30 to 50 students per teacher; however, this varies based on location, the country's economic state and yearly budget for education. The curriculum in primary schools encompasses Language, Art, Contents and Math. Based on the Education Secretary's Policy Circular No. 12 in 1987, "the minimum expected educational outcome for all students is functional literacy and numeracy by the end of primary school."

At the end of Grade 7, students take a national examination in Mathematics,*Agriculture* English, Shona or Ndebele and the General Paper covering Social Sciences, Environmental Science and Religious Education. Zimbabwe's government system requires education for all, but this examination can determine the type of secondary school students can attend based on the school's criteria. Private or religious schools typically have performance requirements, but many rural public schools allow "mass admission" regardless of performance on the examination.

=== Secondary education ===
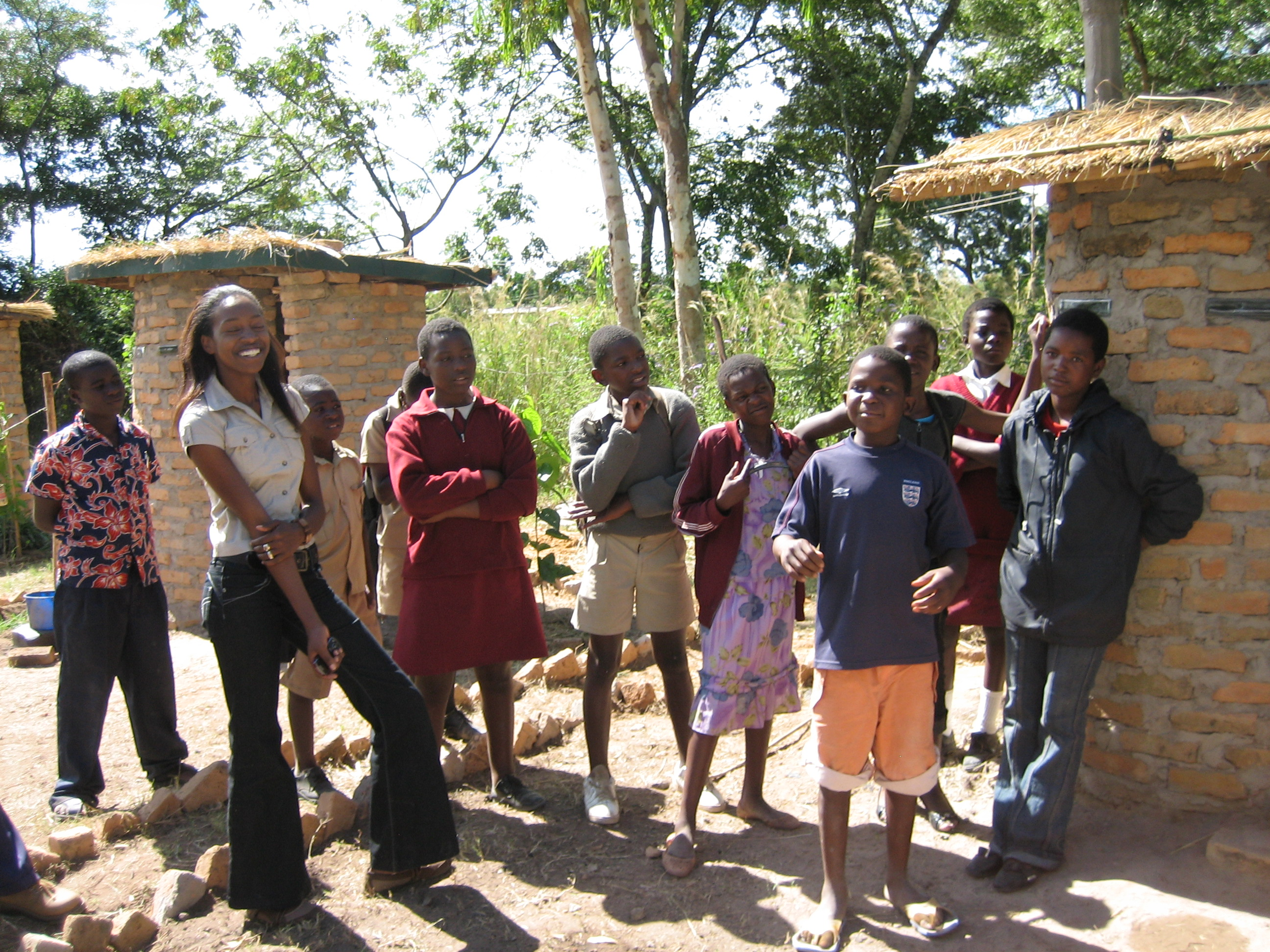
School children outside of Chisungu secondary school.

Secondary education is not funded by the government and students can attend private boarding schools, government boarding school or day school, all with an enrollment fee. Secondary education is made up of two cycles, the General Certificate of Education, or Ordinary Level, for four years and the General Certificate of Education Advanced Level, or Advanced Level, for two years. This structure was adopted from the British system of education.

Students take classes in Mathematics, English, Science, Shona or Ndebele, Geography, and History. The Ordinary Level Certificate Examination is taken after four years in Form 4 and expects students to pass a minimum of five subjects including Science, English, Mathematics, History and a practical subject like woodwork or agriculture. This examination is ranked on a letter scale and can determine student achievement, selection for "A-Level" schools and employment status.

Students have the option to enroll in A-Level secondary education or can attend teacher training, technical, agricultural, polytechnic and nursing colleges. If a student chooses to enroll in A-Level education, they must take the Advanced Level Certificate Examination after a total of six years of secondary education administered by the Zimbabwe Schools Examination Council or Cambridge Assessment International Education. The "A-Level" examination is required for entry to universities in Zimbabwe.

=== Tertiary education ===
The tertiary sector of education is operated by the Ministry of Higher and Tertiary Education which includes universities, technical, polytechnic and teacher training colleges and various vocational training centers. Tertiary education was first introduced to Zimbabwe in 1957 by the University College of Rhodesia and Nyasaland, now known as the University of Zimbabwe. The nation's independency in 1980 expanded the University of Zimbabwe's enrollment from 2,240 to 9,017 by 1990. The National Council for Higher Education was established in 1990 as a measure of quality insurance of higher education in Zimbabwe. Increasing access to education in recent decades has increased the number of higher level institutions in the country. For example, eight more universities were established between 1999 and 2005. The Zimbabwe Council for Higher Education (ZIMCHE) was formed in 2006 as another measure to guarantee quality and accreditation for university education. As of 2012, there were fifteen registered universities (nine public and five private), fifteen teachers' colleges, eight polytechnics and two industrial training colleges.

== Recent factors affecting education in Zimbabwe ==
=== Access to a quality education ===
Despite the initiative during independence to rapidly expand education opportunities, the demand for education was still greater than the supply. Education quality was hindered by teacher shortages, infrastructural pressure and the 2008 financial crisis. UNICEF claims that only a third of schools are considered to be in "good condition." Schools also face capacity challenges, including double session schooling, or "hot seating," and overcrowded classrooms. "Hot seating" means that half of students attend school in the morning and the second half attends school in the afternoon. These methods enable more students to attend school, but quality declines because students are given less attention and time to learn.

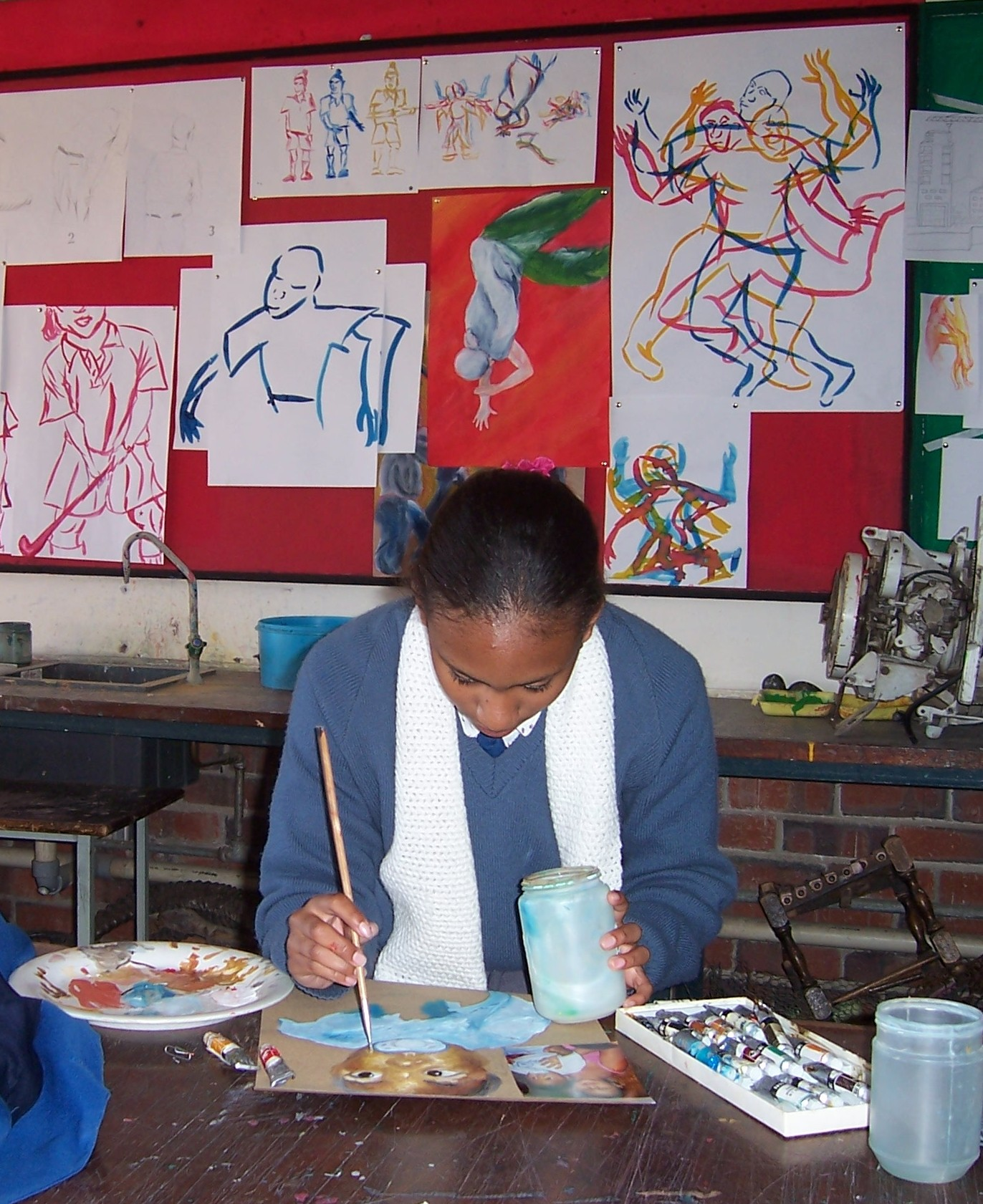
A student works on a school project at Gateway High School in Zimbabwe.

Quality of education is also impacted by the lack of trained teachers in secondary schools. A majority of teaching colleges in Zimbabwe are for primary education training, leaving less opportunity to meet the demand of trained secondary school teachers. Teacher shortages surge is rural areas more than urban areas due to unfavorable working conditions and low compensation. Many teachers in rural areas lack training due to the high demand for labor and less concern for quality. Not only are teachers under compensated, but teaching materials are also allocated less than one percent of the federal budget for education.

=== Funding ===
Zimbabwe's education reform in 1980 aspired to provide free and universal education to all children through the Zimbabwe Education Act; however, tuition fees and education costs have accumulated over time. Many families pay for tuition, even if it is a small fee at public government schools. Families that do not pay for tuition due to education subsidies are still required to pay additional fees including building fees, transportation costs, exam fees, uniforms and stationery for their children. Education is not completely free in Zimbabwe due to historical government expenditures focusing on infrastructure for education. Programs like the Basic Education Assistance Module (BEAM) have developed to prevent orphans and vulnerable children from dropping out of primary school due to the expenses. BEAM pays for tuition and other basic fees, but only serves less than half of the target population. As of 2014, only 10 percent of pupils ages 15 to 24 have not completed primary education which can be attributed to the cost of education.

=== Students with disabilities ===
It is estimated that over 300,000 school-aged children in Zimbabwe have a disability. There is a current push for inclusionary schools in order to provide quality education for students with physical and mental disabilities. Inclusionary schools involve "identification and minimization or elimination of barriers to students’ participation in traditional settings (i.e., schools, homes, communities, and workplaces) and the maximization of resources to support learning and participation." Nondiscriminatory laws, including the Education Act of 1996 and the Disabled Persons Act of 1996, neither catalyze inclusive education for schools in Zimbabwe nor protect students experiencing disability from discrimination in high school.

Most schools perform "unplanned or de facto inclusion" by keeping students with disabilities in classrooms with all other students and teaching them the same curriculum without documentation of their specific disability. Teachers and schools are not equipped to educate and account for students with disabilities; therefore, most drop out by third grade. Schools are finding alternative ways of performing inclusionary education on an individual basis, but there is still a lack of standardization and quality, especially for rural schools. Researcher Regis Chireshe claims inclusionary education needs legislative and policy support, more quality inclusionary education training for teachers and inclusionary education campaigns to improve the stigma associated with people experiencing disabilities. The government has recently expanded the Schools Psychological Services and Special Needs Education Division to better serve students experiencing disabilities in school.

=== Gender differences ===
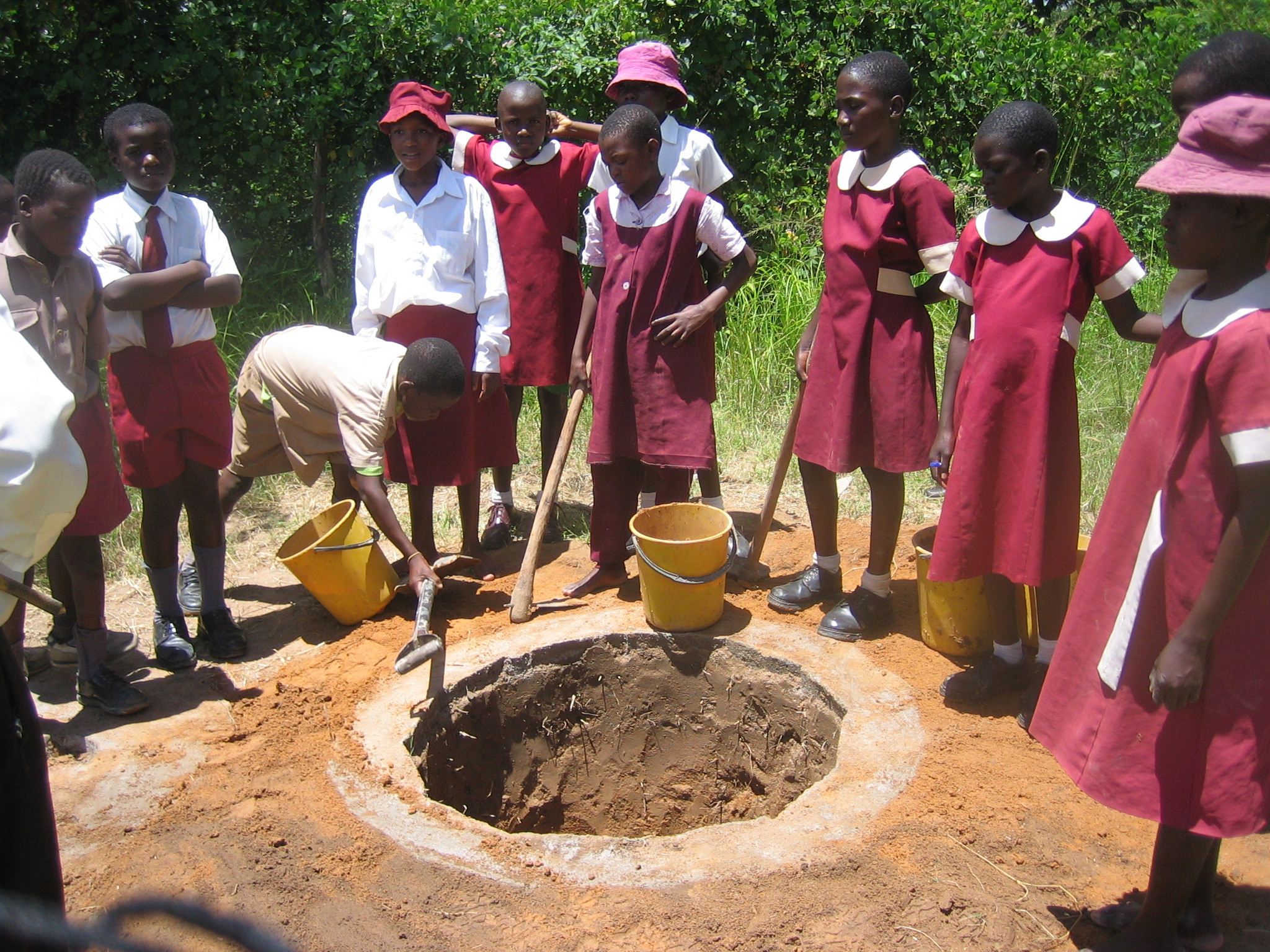
School children in Zimbabwe digging a shallow pit for an Arborloo toilet (a variation of a pit latrine).

Although education is accepted as a fundamental right by the constitution, gender disparities in education still exist. Gender differences are less predominant in primary education than they are in secondary education. The United Nations Zimbabwe claims in 2009, 85 percent of females, compared to 80 percent of males, completed primary school. As of 2010, 48.8 percent of females achieved secondary education or higher, while 62 percent of males achieved secondary education or higher.

Females are increasingly more likely to drop out than their male peers in secondary school due to early marriages, cost of continuing education and gender-based violence in secondary schools. Females are considered a source of income through marriage and families are more likely to educate their sons to increase their earning potential. A lack of education for females correlates with developmental risks including adolescent pregnancy, HIV and AIDs, poor health and poverty. In times of economic hardship, resources for education are allocated to males more than females due to labor roles, social values and gender expectations. However, reports from the UN Children's Fund claim that Zimbabwe's gender gap in education is smaller than many other African countries.

Textbooks are a method to analyzing gender relations and roles in Zimbabwe's curriculum based on the research of Gudhlanga et al. Gudhlanga et al. claims that gender stereotyping is prevalent in textbooks as males are used to describe scientific or technical fields, leadership positions and jobs rather than females. The study by Gudhlanga et al. found that active and productive roles are more commonly held by males in textbooks, while female roles in textbooks are passive and dependent. In addition, the study found that English language textbooks are written from male perspectives and leave out important female leaders and perspectives in history.

=== Teachers ===
Thousands of Zimbabwean teachers have gone on strikes, joined teacher unions and left the profession in recent years over low salaries, poor working conditions, political victimization and violence. Teacher unions including the Progressive Teachers' Union of Zimbabwe organize strikes to catalyze salary negotiations and better working conditions. In the first decade of the 21st century, 45,000 out of 100,000 teachers in the country left the profession.

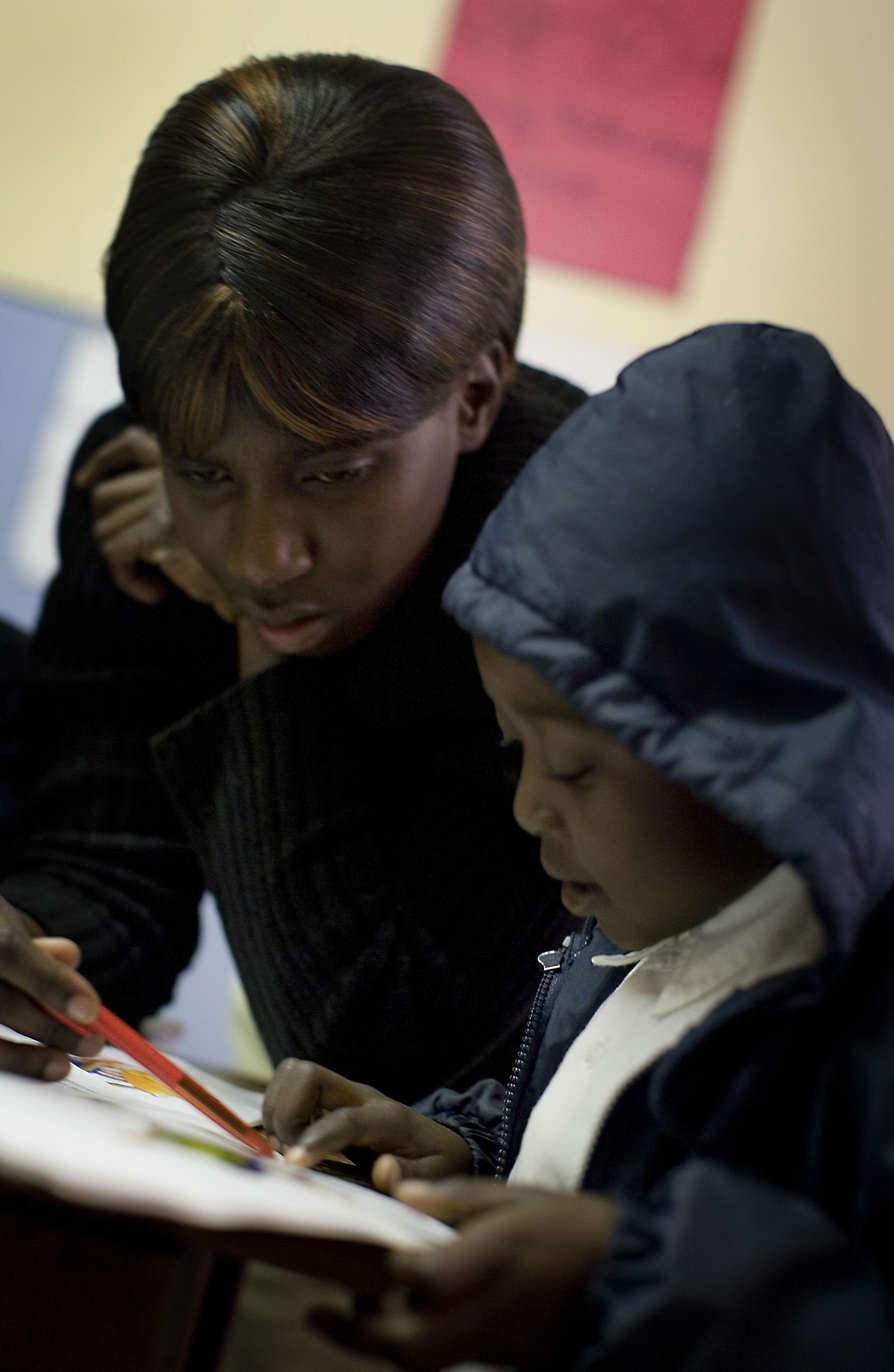
Mercy Mehlomakulu, a teacher who has come from Zimbabwe in search of work and who has recently prequalified in South Africa with assistance from AusAid, teaches some of her pupils in St Albert's school which is part of the Methodist Mission, Johannesburg, South Africa on 4 June 2009.

Marked by a time period of hyperinflation, teachers were one of the lowest paid professions in the 2000s, receiving the equivalence of $10 US dollars for every three months of teaching. Their salaries in 2009 were as low as one US dollar for every month of teaching with grocery vouchers worth $100 USD per month. Thousands of teachers protested, left public education and migrated to other countries in response to the 2008 financial crisis.^{[14]} During a year-long strike from 2008 to 2009, teachers demanded higher salaries paid in international currency. This strike led to nearly 94 percent of all rural schools closing and school attendance rates fell from 80 percent to 20 percent.

Many teachers joined the informal economy, or black sector, during the 2008 financial crisis. They participated in cross-border trading with Botswana and South Africa because civil servants were not required to have visas at the time. Teachers would use their off time during the year to hoard goods from other country and resell them in Zimbabwe to earn a livable living that their teaching salaries did not satisfy.

In 2009, the national economy stabilized because of the actions taken by the newly established Government of National Unity (GNU). The GNU enacted the dollarization of the national economy which curved the effects of hyperinflation and the informal economy. The GNU also allocated every civil servant, including teachers, the equivalent of $100 US dollars. Teachers were encouraged to reenter the profession and move back to Zimbabwe, but thousands never returned and found higher paying positions elsewhere.

Today, the United Nations of Zimbabwe claims that thousands of teachers are unmotivated due to low salaries, limited resources, pressure, political harassment and the shortage of teachers. Researchers Regis Chireshe and Almon Shumba assert that teachers believe their teacher training did not prepare them for the classroom or to teach special education. The researchers also believe that teachers will continue to threaten or actually strike in the future unless their needs are better addressed by the government.

=== Textbooks ===
In 2009, the Educational Transition Fund (ETF) was launched to improve the quality of education by distributing education materials. The ETF partnered with UNICEF and encouraged private donations. Accumulation and distribution of textbooks has been the focus of ETF in recent years. In 2008, The National Education Advisory Board states that 20 percent of students did not have textbooks for core subjects and the student to textbook ratio was 10:1. Thousands of textbooks have been donated in the past few years along with additional learning materials. UNICEF currently reports that the student to textbook ratio is now 1:1 because of international aid from the ETF.

2017 AND THE NEW CURRICULUM Dr Lazarus Dokora, the current Minister of Primary and Secondary Education, has overseen the implementation of a new curriculum which is designed to create a new student totally different from the pre2017 students. This curriculum is focused more on raising heritage awareness and creating employers rather than employees. However, the success of this move is hovering on dark waters because of the present melting economy. It has been affected by intense resource shortage in terms of books and IT.

== See also ==
- Education in Africa
- List of Schools in Zimbabwe
- List of Universities in Zimbabwe
- Ministry of Higher and Tertiary Education, Zimbabwe
- National Council for Higher Education, Zimbabwe
- Zimbabwe
