= Bernard Mizeki College =

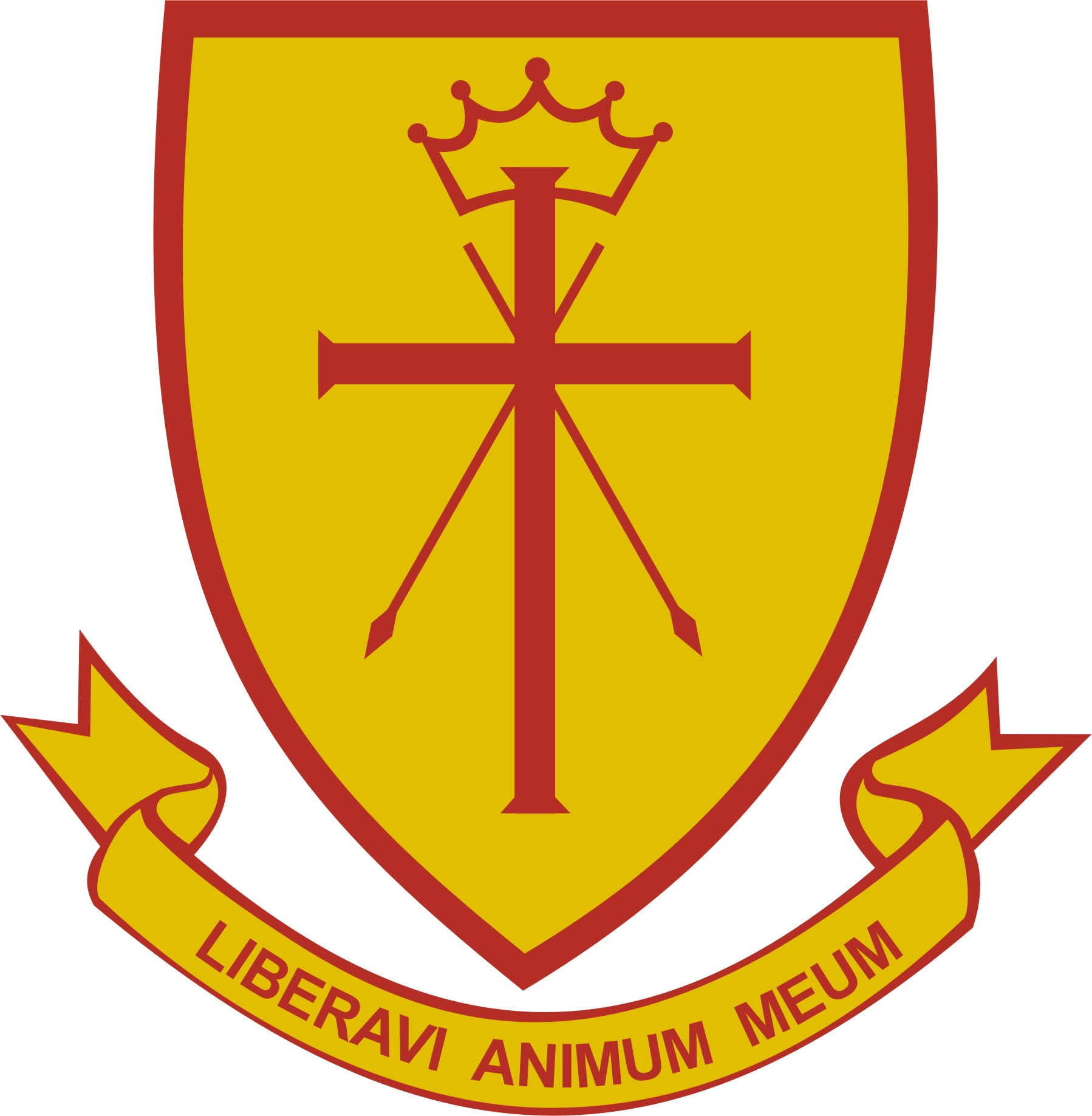
- Bernard Mizeki College Badge

Location
- Marondera, Mashonaland East; Zimbabwe; 18.10246°S 31.64579°E

Information
- Type: Independent, boarding school
- Motto: Liberavi Animum Meum (Latin: I have liberated my soul)
- Established: 1961
- Founder: Peter Holmes Canham
- Locale: Rural
- Oversight: Bernard Mizeki Schools Trust
- Headmaster: A H Matthews
- Staff: 40
- Grades: Form 1 - 6 (grades 8–12)
- Enrollment: 450 boys
- Campus: Rural Area / peri urban, 121 ha (299.00 acres)
- Houses: Kamungu; Molele; Kapuya; Masemola
Colour
- Mascot: Warthog
- Nickname: B.M.C
- Newspaper: The Tidings
- Endowment: None
- Affiliations: Association of Trust Schools; Association of Christian Schools International
- Website: www.bernardmizekicollege.ac.zw

Bernard Mizeki College is an independent boarding school for boys located in Marondera, Zimbabwe, approximately 87 km east of the capital city, Harare, and about 13.5 km northeast of Marondera town. The campus is situated along Pilgrimage Way, at 18.10209°S 31.64585°E.

The college was established in memory of Bernard Mizeki, a Christian martyr who was killed in the surrounding area. Founded by leading members of the Anglican Church in then-colonial Southern Rhodesia, the institution was established through a deed of trust drafted in 1958 and officially registered on 29 May 1959 in Harare.

Although originally intended to be a multi-racial school, Bernard Mizeki College has, over the years, tended to serve African boys where quality education similar to that offered by Peterhouse was limited if not non-existent. The college also enrolled a limited number of female students during certain periods.

== Foundation ==
A group of prominent individuals established Bernard Mizeki College, comprising both European and African, as well as male and female, staff, with the vision of creating a leading high school for African boys. From its inception, the school was intended to evolve into a multiracial and internationally oriented institution.

The founders were inspired by the political and social transformations sweeping across Africa and were committed to offering an education of equal quality to that afforded to European students. They aimed to nurture well-rounded African leaders across a range of fields, including finance, industry, business, education, medicine, law, the military, and politics. The Right Reverend Cecil Alderson, following the example of his predecessor, Bishop Edward Paget, recognized the urgent need for a senior college for African students. After his translation from the Diocese of Bloemfontein, Bishop Alderson actively pursued this objective.

At the same time, Canon Robert Grinham, a longstanding advocate for African education, had been championing the establishment of institutions with facilities on par with those of elite schools such as Ruzawi, Springvale, and Peterhouse. Upon his retirement from Springvale, Grinham dedicated his efforts fully to this cause.

Together, Bishop Alderson and Canon Grinham raised £100 to establish the Bernard Mizeki Schools Trust, which was mandated to oversee the founding of the new institution. The trust deed was drafted by the legal firm Honey and Blanckenberg and officially registered in 1959. A separate trust under the same name was registered in the United Kingdom in July 1962 under trust number 313889.

During the Lambeth Conference in London, Bishop Alderson received a pledge of £40,000 to fund the project. A significant portion of this funding is believed to have come from the Beit Trust, along with contributions from anonymous donors, financial institutions, and corporate sponsors. During the foundation years, some Board members were appointed from leading companies in then Rhodesia, including organisations such as Lever Brothers, Standard Chartered Bank, Johnson & Fletcher (later acquired by PG Industries Zimbabwe) , and the Rhodesian Iron and Steel Company (RISCO), later known as the Zimbabwe Iron and Steel Company (ZISCO). These companies contributed to the school through bursaries for academically gifted but financially disadvantaged African students and, in some cases, by supporting school construction projects.

The college was envisioned as a multiracial, elite boys' school an "African Eton"—with strong support from the Anglican Church and private sector stakeholders from the Federation of Rhodesia and Nyasaland. With the endorsement of the Governor-General of the Federation, initial fundraising efforts encountered minimal resistance.

The architectural master plan was developed by architect John Vigour in 1959. Construction began in 1960 with the arrival of Bruce Berrington and a team of artisans who had previously worked on the Peterhouse campus. The college was constructed on the 1,900 hectare Bovey Tracey Estate a scenic location featuring brachystegia woodland and granite outcrops which had previously housed St. Bernard’s School since 1891. The college sits on 20 hactares of the Bovey Tracey Estate.

Targeting students from Africa’s emerging professional and upper classes, the school charged tuition fees significantly higher three to four times than those of typical mission schools.

The college’s first headmaster was Peter Holmes Canham, a British civil servant who had served in Ghana. He was affectionately nicknamed "Kwame" by students, after Ghana’s founding president Kwame Nkrumah. Known for his energy and charisma, Canham was also described as eccentric, with a passionate but sometimes short-tempered demeanor. He assumed his role in September 1960.

However, the project was not without opposition. Canon David Neaum resigned from nearby St. Bernard’s Mission and relocated to Chikwaka Mission in protest. He criticized the decision to prioritize an elite institution when broader access to education particularly for girls was still lacking.

By the time Father Andrew Hunt, the college’s third headmaster, retired, student enrolment had reached 320 boys. He subsequently moved to Mutare, where he served as chair of the board at St. David’s Bonda. The outbreak of the liberation war, however, disrupted the school’s expansion, and government subsidies were withdrawn. Following Father Hunt’s departure, Reverend Leslie Davies was appointed headmaster.

Rev. Davies's tenure was cut short amid escalating violence in the region, including the murder of nearby farmers and clergy at St. Paul’s Musami. On the advice of local police, he left the school for safety reasons. To ensure the college remained open unlike other institutions such as Eagle School in Manicaland, which closed in 1976 the board appointed Mr. Chiadzwa as headmaster.

== Governance ==
Bernard Mizeki College is governed by the Bernard Mizeki Schools Trust, established in 1959 by Canon Robert Grinham and the Right Reverend Cecil Alderson.

A central figure in the early development of the college was Peter Holmes Canham, a former colonial civil servant, who played a pivotal role in positioning Bernard Mizeki College as a leading independent school. Working alongside the Board of Governors, Canham led efforts to raise funds for campus construction, staff recruitment, and long-term institutional sustainability. Known for his administrative acumen, he effectively managed the school’s operations, allowing academic staff to focus on teaching. Canham also held progressive views on the role of education in society. In an era when Black Africans were excluded from many public spaces, he took student prefects to dine at Salisbury’s Ambassador Hotel to introduce them to the etiquette of formal public settings.

From the outset, the college operated under a formal governance structure designed to uphold academic excellence, financial oversight, and institutional integrity. The hierarchy was as follows:

- Patrons
  - The Rt. Honourable Earl of Dalhousie – Governor-General of the Federation of Rhodesia and Nyasaland
  - Sir Humphrey Gibbs – Governor of Southern Rhodesia
  - Sir Ellis Robins
- Trustees
  - Composed of senior individuals from the legal, business, and public sectors
  - Notable trustee: Robert Stumbles – Lawyer, Stumbles and Row
- Board of Governors
  - Chaired by the Bishop of the Diocese of Harare, within the Church of the Province of Central Africa (CPCA)
  - Includes leading national figures from politics, law, and education
  - Notable members: Herbert Chitepo, Robert Tredgold
- Executive Committee
  - A subcommittee of the Board responsible for academic and operational oversight
  - Includes the Rector of Peterhouse as a permanent member, ensuring alignment with Peterhouse educational standards
- School Administration
  - Peter H. Canham - Headmaster
  - Michael Pocock - Deputy Headmaster

This governance structure was designed to ensure accountability, uphold academic excellence, and maintain financial integrity throughout the institution's development.

== The College and the Primary School ==
In its early years, Bernard Mizeki College operated under the headmastership of Peter Holmes Canham, while the adjacent Bernard Mizeki Primary School was led by Mr. G.F. Coney. Though functioning as distinct institutions—secondary and primary, respectively—both schools fell under the same Board of Governors and were developed as part of a unified educational vision.

Canham served as headmaster of the college for four years before being succeeded by Reverend R. Glazebrook. Both schools received substantial assistance from the Ministry of African Education of the Southern Rhodesia Government. Although financial constraints temporarily slowed planned expansion, by 1963 enrolment had reached 180 pupils at the college and 140 at the primary school. Pupils who completed the primary school program were granted automatic admission into the college.

Under the leadership of Mr. P. Nheweyembwa, the college embarked on several developmental initiatives. In recognition of these efforts, Bernard Mizeki College was awarded the Secretary’s Bell Merit Award for Best School in Mashonaland East in 2014.

Peter Holmes Canham, a seasoned civil servant from the former British colony of the Gold Coast (now Ghana), began his administrative career in the 1930s and remained in service until Ghana’s independence in 1957. Following this, he relocated to Southern Rhodesia and assumed the headmastership of Bernard Mizeki College.

Canham introduced several progressive governance systems within the student body. Most notably, he established a student senate in which hostel representatives were elected through annual campaigns, replacing the traditional prefect appointment model. This initiative cultivated leadership and accountability, and many alumni of the college later emerged as prominent figures in business, law, and politics. One former staff member remarked: "It was because of my experiences at the school that I later went into teaching, but I never again came across such an inspirational headteacher. Later, it was the lack of true leadership skills that made so many of the schools at which I taught for almost 30 years such disappointing places."

Due to the involvement of the same architect and construction team who had built Peterhouse, similarities between buildings at the two institutions became apparent. This led to a well-documented dispute between F. R. Snell, the first Rector of Peterhouse, and Canham, with Snell accusing Canham of copying Peterhouse’s building plans.

In 1964, Canham departed Bernard Mizeki College following disagreements with the Board of Governors. He subsequently held various leadership roles in education across Africa, including headships in Uganda, principalships at teacher training colleges in Western and Northern Nigeria, and academic appointments in the Institutes of Education at the Universities of London and Cardiff. He retired in June 1981 but died in October 1984 after a period of ill health.

== Association of Trust Schools ==
On 19 October 1962, Bernard Mizeki College became a founding member of the Association of Trust Schools (ATS), with Mr. G.C.V. Coppen representing the institution at the inaugural meeting. This event also marked the formation of the Conference of Heads of Independent Schools in Zimbabwe (CHISZ), further establishing the college’s early leadership role in the development of independent education in Zimbabwe.

In subsequent decades, the college’s membership in both ATS and CHISZ lapsed due to a decline in institutional standards. However, following a sustained period of reform and development under the leadership of Headmaster Howard Mathews, Bernard Mizeki College met the required criteria for reinstatement. In March 2025, the college was officially readmitted to both organizations.

As of 2025, Bernard Mizeki College is also an active member of the International Boys' Schools Coalition (IBSC).

== Infrastructure Projects ==
In recent years, Bernard Mizeki College has undertaken a series of infrastructure development projects.

A significant milestone was the construction of a 1,000,000-litre (1m³) water reservoir to improve the school’s water security. Headmaster Howard Mathews noted, "you cannot build a good school without a reliable water supply." This initiative was supported by the successful installation of water pipelines from the nearby Kushinga Phikelela Dam, ensuring a sustainable and independent water source for the college.

In the area of sports development, two new tennis courts were completed in 2023, followed by the construction of four modern basketball courts in 2024.

Looking ahead, the college is actively fundraising for the construction of a new multi-purpose pavilion. The proposed structure is intended to serve as a central venue for sports events, assemblies, and school ceremonies. The project is being spearheaded by the Old Mizekians Association, with further information available on their official website.

Some parents have enquired whether the Board will consider expanding the school to admit girls. The school authorities have advised that there is currently insufficient appropriate infrastructure to support such an expansion. While the Board has not issued any formal pronouncement on the matter, there are indications that a separate girls’ school, rather than a co-educational model, may be established nearby or within the Bovey Tracey Estate. Timelines for this potential development have not yet been determined.

== Motto and School Emblem ==
The college's motto is in latin, Liberavi animum meum, which translates to "I have liberated my mind."

The school emblem was designed in 1960 by Mr. Watambwa, one of the artisans involved in the original construction of the college. The emblem features a shield bearing a cross, overlaid diagonally by two spears. Atop the cross rests a martyr's crown, symbolizing sacrifice and conviction. The college motto appears on a ribbon beneath the shield.

== Academic ==
Bernard Mizeki College offers a comprehensive curriculum designed to provide students with both academic and practical learning opportunities. Since November 2015, the curriculum has been expanded to include a wider selection of specialised subjects, enabling pupils to choose combinations of academic, commercial, or technical disciplines based on their interests.

=== ZIMSEC Public Examinations ===
In 2014, the college achieved a 96.97% pass rate in the ZIMSEC A‑Level exams—ranking 53rd nationally and 7th in Mashonaland East Province—from 33 candidates. In the same year, a cohort of 71 Ordinary Level candidates recorded an 86.11% pass rate, placing the college 29th nationally. These results prompted calls from parents and alumni for enhanced academic performance.

Subsequent years saw continued improvement. In 2024, the college attained a 93.9% pass rate at ZIMSEC A‑Level, positioning it among Zimbabwe's top-performing schools. By 2025, it further improved its A‑Level performance to a 90.9% pass rate, earning a #15 ranking in the national Top 100 list.

=== Curricular Offerings ===
The college prepares students for both ZIMSEC O‑Level and A‑Level examinations and also offers Cambridge General Paper at Sixth Form level. Core subjects include Mathematics, English Language and Literature, General Paper, History, Geography, Accounting, Divinity, and Design & Technology.

Effective January 2026, all Ordinary Level students who pass will be automatically enrolled into Lower Sixth Form. In parallel, the school is exploring additional curricular pathways to accommodate diverse interests and talents, including practical, technical, creative, and entrepreneurial options. These alternatives are still under development and will be communicated once finalized. Historically, the school enrolled approximately 90 students per stream at Ordinary Level but admitted only the top 60 performers into Lower Sixth Form. This selective cap has now been abolished as part of a deliberate strategy to strengthen and expand the A-Level cohorts.

== Post Covid Era ==
In August 2020, the Bernard Mizeki Schools Trust board of governors appointed Howard Mathews as headmaster of Bernard Mizeki College. Mathews had prior experience managing private schools and CHISZ/ATS relationships. During his tenure, the school expanded its curriculum offerings and undertook infrastructural improvements, including renovations to hostels and construction of new sports fields. As of 2026, an ongoing project involves installing a paved walkway from the main entrance to the school campus.

== Recent Challenges ==
In November 2015, the Cabinet of Zimbabwe adopted a civil service reform report that recommended the withdrawal of government funding for teacher salaries at private and trust schools. The move was part of broader austerity measures in response to the country's ongoing economic crisis.

At the time, the government was providing salary support to 17 teachers stationed at Bernard Mizeki College. Nationally, it was estimated that teachers at private schools were receiving a total of approximately US$70 million annually in salaries and allowances from the government budget.

Following the policy change, Bernard Mizeki College was required to engage parents and guardians in discussions to determine alternative arrangements for sustaining teacher salaries. Any proposed agreements were to be submitted to the Ministry of Primary and Secondary Education for approval. Affected teachers at the college reportedly received their final government-paid salaries from the Salary Services Bureau in July 2016.

== Notable alumni ==
- Sam Moyo - Scholar and land reform activist, co-founder and executive director of the African Institute for Agrarian Studies, and President of the Council for the Development of Social Science Research in Africa (CODESRIA).
- Jameson Timba — former member of Parliament for Mount Pleasant
- Chirikure Chirikure — Zimbabwean poet, songwriter, and writer

== See also ==
- List of schools in Zimbabwe
- List of boarding schools
