= Peterhouse (disambiguation) =

Peterhouse may refer to:

- Peterhouse, Cambridge
- Peterhouse Boys' School
- Peterhouse Girls' School
- Peterhouse school of history
- Peterhouse partbooks
- Peterhouse Group of Schools
