= Peterhouse School =

Peterhouse School may be referring to

- Peterhouse Boys' School, in Mashonaland East, Zimbabwe
- Peterhouse Girls' School, in Mashonaland East, Zimbabwe
- Peterhouse school of history
