= Convent (disambiguation) =

A convent is a community of priests, religious brothers, religious sisters or nuns, or the building used by such a community.

Convent or convento may also refer to:

== Places ==
- Convent, Louisiana, U.S.
- Convent Gallery, an art museum in Australia
- Convento Building (Mission San Fernando), on the U.S. National Register of Historic Places
- Hotel El Convento, a hotel in Puerto Rico
- Convento, a town in Piedmont, Italy

== Schools ==
- Dominican Convent High School, Harare, Zimbabwe
- Dominican Convent High School, Bulawayo, Zimbabwe
- Dominican Convent Primary School, Bulawayo, Zimbabwe
- Dominican Convent Primary School, Harare, Zimbabwe

== Other uses ==
- Convent (band), a project of Emilie Autumn

== See also ==
- The Convent (disambiguation)
