= Peterhouse Group of Schools =

- Peterhouse Group of Schools
- Abbreviation: PH
- Formation: 1955
- Founder: Fred Snell
- Rector: Jonathan Trafford
- Website: www.peterhouse.org

The Peterhouse Group of Schools (or simply, the Peterhouse Group) is a group of Anglican boarding schools with 1,045 pupils on estates of 1,200 hectares (3,000 acres) just outside the city of Marondera, Zimbabwe, and comprises Peterhouse Boys' School, Peterhouse Girls' School, Springvale House the Preparatory School, Peterhaven at Nyanga and the Gosho Park and Calderwood Park conservation education projects and wildlife sanctuaries.

== Schools ==
=== Peterhouse Boys' School ===
The boys' school is the oldest member of the group. It was founded in 1955 by Rector Fred Snell, who had previously been headmaster at Michaelhouse in South Africa.

The school has an enrollment of approximately 500 boys, all of whom are boarders. The boys are organised into six houses named after people who were significant in the history of the school or the Anglican Church in Zimbabwe. They are, in order of founding:

- Ellis, named after Sir Ellis Robins. He was Chairman of the British South Africa Company.
- Paget, named after The Rev Edward Francis Paget who was a Zimbabwean Anglican Bishop in the middle part of the 20th century.
- Grinham, named after Robert Grinham founder and former headmaster of Ruzawi School.
- Malvern, named after Sir Godfrey Huggins who became Lord Malvern. He was a Prime Minister of Southern Rhodesia (1933–53) and first Prime Minister of the Federation of Rhodesia and Nyasaland (1953–56).
- Founders, named in honour of all the schools founders.
- Snell, named after Fred Snell, the school's founder.

Each boy is allocated a house upon enrollment, and he remains a member of that house until he leaves. In addition to the houses being buildings in which the boys reside, they are also the teams through which the boys compete on the sporting academic and cultural front.

In the late 1980s an additional house, Tinokura was created to house D Block boys (aged 13 and 14) in their first year at Peterhouse. Tinokura is organised so that each boy shares a dormitory with other D Blockers from his house for the year; its purpose is to allow the new boy to adjust to the Peterhouse 'system' before exposure to the strict regimental functioning of the main houses.

=== Peterhouse Girls' School ===
The girls' school was founded in 1987, two years after the opening of Springvale House under the headship of Michael Hammond with 28 pupils. Peterhouse Girls' has an enrollment of 430 boarding pupils. Unlike Peterhouse Boys', the girls' school has two separate house systems (that is, boarding and competitive houses). The girls' school has a horizontal boarding structure.

The boarding houses at Peterhouse Girls' School are:

- D Block accommodates girls in D Block (Form 1).
- Kathleen House was named after Kathleen Grinham, wife of Canon Robert Grinham, founder of Springvale School and accommodates the C Block (Form 2) girls.
- Margaret House was named after Margaret Snell, wife of Fred Snell, founder of Peterhouse and accommodates the B Block (Form 3) girls.
- Elizabeth House was named after Elizabeth Megahey, wife of Alan Megahey, who established the Peterhouse Group of Schools and accommodates the A Block (Form 4) girls.
- Williams Field - The senior girls (that is, the Vth Form and VIth Form) move into Vth Form cottages and VIth Form cottages.

The competitive houses compete in areas such as academics, cultural and sporting activities. House points are awarded for these competitions. The houses are named after some of the first animals at Gosho Park, the names are:

- Eland,
- Impala,
- Kudu and
- Sable.

=== Springvale House ===
Initially founded as Springvale School in 1952 by Robert Grinham and Maurice Carver (then a boys' school), the school reopened in 1985 under the oversight of the Peterhouse Group with the name Springvale House. The school is a co-educational day and boarding institution, unlike the senior schools in the Group which are single-sex, full-boarding institutions.

== Parks ==
=== Gosho Park ===
Gosho Park is a conservation area of approximately 340 hectares (840 acres; 3.4 km^{2}) of land on the Springvale Estate (it is adjacent to Peterhouse Girls' School and Springvale House), enclosed by a 2.3 metres (7.5 ft) game fence. It named after Patrick Gosho, a former Estate Manager at Springvale House. The park is an area of Brachystegia woodland with two streams, their associated grasslands and rocky outcrops (some with Bushmen paintings). 237 species of birds have been recorded by the Mashonaland East Birding Group with a variety of Brachystegia species such as the spotted creeper, miombo and rufous-bellied tits. There are 72 species of trees in the area as recorded by the Tree Society.

Gosho Park is used regularly by the three schools and neighbouring schools for educational and recreational purposes. Conservation camps are organised for primary school pupils; and geography field trips, research projects in biology and leadership courses take place in the park.

== Petrean Society ==
The Petrean Society is the alumni/alumnae association of individuals involved in the Peterhouse Boys' and Peterhouse Girls' schools. A Petrean is any pupil who has been a member of the school, normally for a minimum period of two years; any person who has been a member of the staff of the school for at least three years; or any person who has been a member of the executive committee of the school for at least three years.

== See also ==
- Peterhouse Boys' School
- Peterhouse Girls' School
- Springvale House
- Gosho Park
- Calderwood Park
