= Peterhouse, Marondera =

Peterhouse, Marondera may refer to

- Peterhouse Boys' School
- Peterhouse Girls' School
