= Philip J Day =

British film producer, screenwriter, director and author

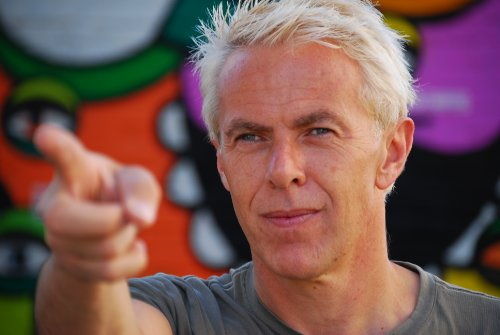
- Born: Harrogate, England
- Occupations: Film and television producer, director, and writer

Philip J Day is a British film and television producer, director, and writer. He has worked on documentary, factual, and scripted projects for broadcasters including the BBC, Discovery Channel, History, Channel Four, PBS, and the National Geographic Channel.

His productions have received industry recognition, including a Peabody Award and two Emmy Award wins. Day has been credited on series including National Geographic Explorer, Discovery Channel's Curiosity, Kindred Spirits, Stan Lee's Lucky Man, and Alaska: The Last Frontier. In 2008, he founded Edge West Productions.

== Career ==
In 2023 Day produced The Cello (2023 film), an international co-production starring Jeremy Irons and Tobin Bell, directed by Darren Lynn Bousman. That same year he was producer on Patrick Aryee's Wild World for Sky TV. In 2021 Day directed a six-part, crime series Dying to Be Famous, about the suspicious death of model, Ryan Singleton, airing on Bounce TV. That same year, he produced the supernatural reality show, Kindred Spirits. In 2019, The Russian Bride, starring Corbin Bernsen and Kristina Pimenova, which Day produced, was chosen to close the Fantasporto International Film Festival. Between 2016 and 2018, Day worked with notable comic book author Stan Lee on Stan Lee's Lucky Man. Day also worked with director Robert Rodriguez for the BBC show Robert Rodriguez' Ten Minute Film School. Day wrote and directed a number of documentaries for National Geographic including a film about D. B. Cooper, a man who has eluded the FBI for over thirty years. His two-hour film about the Luxor massacre was called Massacre in Luxor. In 2000, Day created a series for TLC Why Doctors Make Mistakes. A year later he produced the TV show High Stakes: Bet Your Life on Vegas which partnered with Emmy Award winning actor Ray Liotta. In 2006 he moved to California, where he set up Edge West Productions. Between 2008 and 2018 Edge West won multiple awards for productions like The Skyjacker That Got Away for National Geographic Channel. In 2010 Philip J. Day was nominated for an Emmy Award at the 2010 News and Documentary Emmy Awards for the film The Skyjacker That Got Away.

== Held At Gunpoint ==
In 2009 Day and his team had been filming in the desert of southern Peru on a film about the Nazca Lines for National Geographic Channel. At around 3:45 am five armed men, wearing face masks, scaled a twenty-foot wall to break into the hotel, where Day and his team were asleep. The assailants first took the receptionist and hotel manager hostage at gunpoint. The receptionist was bound and gagged while the manager was forced to provide a master key for all the bedrooms. The attackers had specifically come to steal expensive film equipment. They beat up several people and stole some equipment, but the actions of hotel staff saved the crew from a more severe and potentially life-threatening robbery.

== Family & Early Life ==
Day attended Springvale House (Prep School), and Peterhouse Boys' School, near Harare, Zimbabwe. Later he went to Ackworth School, near Pontefract, Yorkshire. Day is the brother of environmental lawyer, Martyn Day (lawyer). He is the son of Hazel Day, a notable actress and opera singer in Yorkshire, and Brian Day (deceased), a chartered accountant. Hazel Day is known for performances with the York light Opera Company. Her best known performances were in Kiss Me Kate, Song of Norway, and Kismet.

== Bibliography ==
- Empire’s Witness: A Soldier’s Secret War Diary 1942–45 (2026)

== Selected Filmography ==
- The Cello (2023) – Independent film
- Patrick Aryee's Wild World (2023) – Sky TV
- Kindred Spirits (2022) – Travel Channel
- Dying to Be Famous: The Ryan Singleton Mystery (2022) – Bounce TV
- Lost in the Wild (2021) – Travel Channel
- The Russian Bride (2020) – Independent film
- Amanda to the Rescue (2019) – Animal Planet
- Stan Lee's Lucky Man (2018) – Sky 1
- San Diego: City of Adventure (2018) – National Geographic
- Off the Map (2018) – Travel Channel
- Inside North Korea: Then & Now (2018) – National Geographic
- Navy SEALs: America's Secret Warriors (2017) – History
- Love Kills (2017) – Investigation Discovery
- The Amityville Terror (2016) – Independent film
- Stan Lee's Lucky Man (2016) – Sky 1
- Euroclub (2016) – Independent film
- Outrageous Acts of Psych (2015) – Science Channel
- Blood Relatives (2015) – Investigation Discovery
- Polar Bear Town (2015) – Smithsonian Channel
- Alaska: The Last Frontier (2013) – Discovery Channel
- Party Like the Rich and Famous (2012) – National Geographic
- Party Like the Queen of France (2012) – National Geographic
- Party Like a Roman Emperor (2012) – National Geographic
- Volcano Time Bomb (2012) – Discovery Channel
- Vanished from Alcatraz (2011) – National Geographic
- Crime Lords of Tokyo (2011) – National Geographic
- Nasca Lines: The Buried Secrets (2010) – National Geographic
- Explorer 25 Years (2010) – National Geographic
- Born to Rage? (2010) – National Geographic
- Great Escape: The Final Secrets (2009) – National Geographic
- The Skyjacker That Got Away (2009) – National Geographic
- Lost Cities of the Amazon (2008) – National Geographic
- Tunnel to a Lost World (2008) – National Geographic
- Inside Rio Carnaval (2007) – PBS
- The Real Roswell (2007) – National Geographic
- Ancient Plastic Surgery (2005) – Channel 4 / Discovery
- Megastructures (2005) – National Geographic
- Mind of a Millionaire (2003) – BBC
- Massacre in Luxor (2002) – BBC / NHK
- Hollywood Inc (2002) – TLC
- City of the God Kings (2002) – Channel 4 / Discovery
- High Stakes: Bet Your Life on Vegas (2001) – TLC
- Challenger: Go for Launch (2000) – BBC / Discovery
- Why Doctors Make Mistakes (2000) – Channel 4 / TLC
- The Johnson Tapes (1999) – Channel 4 / History Channel
- Riddle of the Skies (1999) – Channel 4 / Discovery
- Passion, Pride & Penalties (1998) – BBC
- Cancer Wars (1998) – Channel 4 / Discovery
- Casualty 250 (1998) – BBC
- Hello Mr. President (1997) – Channel 4 / History Channel
