= Roditi =

Roditi is a surname. Notable people with the surname include:

- Claudio Roditi (1946–2020), Brazilian jazz trumpeter
- David Roditi (born 1973), Mexican tennis player
- Édouard Roditi (1910–1992), French-American poet, short-story writer and translator
- Matan Roditi (born 1998), Israeli marathon swimmer
- Nicholas Roditi (born 1945), British hedge fund manager
