= Hatendi =

Hatendi is a Zimbabwean surname. Notable people with the surname include:

- David Hatendi (1953–2012), Zimbabwean businessman, entrepreneur, and banker
- Nyasha Hatendi (born 1981), American-English actor and producer
- Peter Hatendi (1927–2018), Zimbabwean bishop
