= James B. Rosenwald =

American fund manager and academic

Jamie Rosenwald
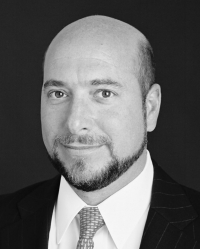
- Born: January 19, 1958 (age 68); New York City
- Citizenship: United States
- Education: A.B. Vassar; M.B.A. NYU Stern School of Business
- Occupations: Portfolio manager, adjunct professor
- Spouse: Laura D. Parker (m. 1985)

James B. Rosenwald III (born January 19, 1958) is an American investment advisor and academic who is the co-founder and Chief Investment Officer of Dalton Investments Inc., an asset management, and adjunct professor at Stern School of Business at New York University. He invests in the Pacific Rim area.

In 2020, Rosenwald co-founded Activist Japan investment trust Nippon Active Value Fund (NAVF) and launched its IPO. Rising Sun Management Ltd. serves as the fund's investment advisor.

== Early life and education ==
Rosenwald was born in New York City. He is the brother of designer and ceramic artist Jill Rosenwald, and the first cousin of actress Kyra Sedgwick. Rosenwald attended the Dalton School in Manhattan for 15 years, where he met Steve Persky, his partner at Dalton Investments. He received an A.B. in economics from Vassar College (1980) and an M.B.A. from the Graduate School of Business at New York University (1984). He is a CFA Charterholder (number 9857) since November 1987.

== Investment career ==
Rosenwald commenced his investment career at Sterling Grace & Co. While acting as an outside advisor for Soros Fund Management, Rosenwald met Nicholas Roditi, who was also managing money for Soros. In 1992, Rosenwald and Roditi founded and co-managed Rosenwald, Roditi & Company, Ltd., now known as Rovida Asset Management, Ltd. Rosenwald co-founded Dalton Investments in 1999. Assets under management were $6.9 billion as of September 30, 2026.

Dalton's global value investment process involves holding undervalued stocks for the long term. In particular, it prefers owner-operator companies that align the interests of management and shareholders. In 2020, the firm became a signatory to Climate Action 100+, an investor initiative focused on corporate greenhouse gas emissions. In 2024, the U.S. House Judiciary Committee named Dalton in an investigation into the initiative, with Committee Chairman Jim Jordan characterizing the group as an "ESG cartel". Rosenwald is also the chairman and CEO of Rosenwald Capital Management, Inc, a registered investment advisor since 1984. Clients include pensions, endowments, financial services companies, sovereign wealth funds, profit sharing plans and high-net-worth individuals.

In addition to securities investments, Rosenwald has been involved in institutional real estate investments since 1997. He and Kyle Kazan co-founded Beach Front Properties, LLC, a California-based real estate investment company. Their real estate activities have reportedly included residential and commercial properties in the United States, China, and Germany.

Rosenwald's business relationship with Kazan also extends to Glass House Brands Inc. (NYSE: GLAS), a California-based cannabis company co-founded by Kazan and Jocelyn M. Rosenwald his daughter, who is also a Director of Dalton Investments, Inc. According to Glass House Brands' 2026 management information circular, as of May 1, 2026, Rosenwald beneficially owned or controlled, directly or indirectly, 819,406 Multiple Voting Shares, representing 17.2% of that share class, and 1,891,003 Equity Shares, representing 2.4% of that class. These holdings represented approximately 13.5% of the company's total voting power.

In July 2025, Glass House Brands' cultivation facilities in Camarillo and Carpinteria, California, were raided by U.S. Immigration and Customs Enforcement (ICE) agents as part of an investigation into alleged labor violations. The operation resulted in the detention of workers and drew national media attention regarding labor practices in the cannabis industry.

Since 2012, Rosenwald has been an adjunct professor at the Stern School of Business at New York University, where he teaches a course "Global Value Investing", which he learned from his grandfather who worked for Benjamin Graham, the "father of value investing", at Graham-Newman Corporation. He and his wife, Laura, make annual contributions to NYU's endowment to fund the Rosenwald Global Value Student Investment Fund. Every year, the fund invests in one or more stocks based on recommendations made by the students in his class. In 2025, Laura and James Rosenwald sponsored the Rosenwald Investment Competition at NYU.

== Relationship With Jeffrey Epstein ==
In January 2015, James Rosenwald exchanged emails with financier Jeffrey Epstein that were later released by the U.S. House Committee on Oversight and Accountability in November 2025. In an email titled “High Profile,” sent on January 5, 2015, Rosenwald wrote that during the Thanksgiving weekend he had “toasted” Epstein while visiting Long Island, adding that Epstein's “name popped up again in the Press and I thought it was time to congratulate you on your wonderful financial successes since your days as my Physics prof at Dalton!!” He further commented, “Unless your PR advisor is Donald Trump, I am not sure that current press provides you with much benefit.”

According to Washington Square News, the email was sent shortly after media coverage reported civil allegations that Prince Andrew had sexually abused a minor in connection with Epstein, allegations that Prince Andrew denied. Rosenwald later confirmed that Epstein had been his physics teacher at the Dalton School in the mid-1970s.

== Public company directorships ==
Year	Company	Location
2025 to 2026	Hogy Medical Co. Ltd	Tokyo, Japan
2011 to 2025	Shore Capital Corp.	London, UK
2006–2011	Puma Brandenburg Ltd.	London, UK
1989–1991	Grove Bank	Chestnut Hill, MA
1986–1988	Richmond Hill Savings Bank	Floral Park, NY

== Private company directorships / managing member ==
Year	Company
1998 to Present	Dalton Investments, Inc.
1984 to Present	Rosenwald Capital Management, Inc.
1998 to Present	Kings Bay Investment Company, Ltd.
2020 to Present	Rising Sun Management Ltd.
2005 to 2019	Dalton Berlin Real Estate Fund I, Ltd.
2005 to Present	Dalton Asia Fund
2004 to 2022	Dalton Greater China Fund
1997 to Present	Beach Front Properties, LLC.
2010 to Present	Beach Front Property Management, Inc.
2001 to 2013	Prodigy Asia & Emerging Markets Fund
2003 to 2011	Grand River Properties, Ltd.
2003 to 2009	JMBO Fund
2004 to 2007	Dalton Japan Absolute Return Fund
1993 to 1997	Rosenwald, Roditi & Company, Ltd.

== Social and charitable affiliations ==
- Palos Verdes Country Club (California)
- Penn Club (New York)
- The University Club (New York)
- Los Angeles Philharmonic: Board of Overseers
- Center Theater Group Artistic Directors Circle (Los Angeles)
