= Brian Mujati =

South Africa international rugby union player

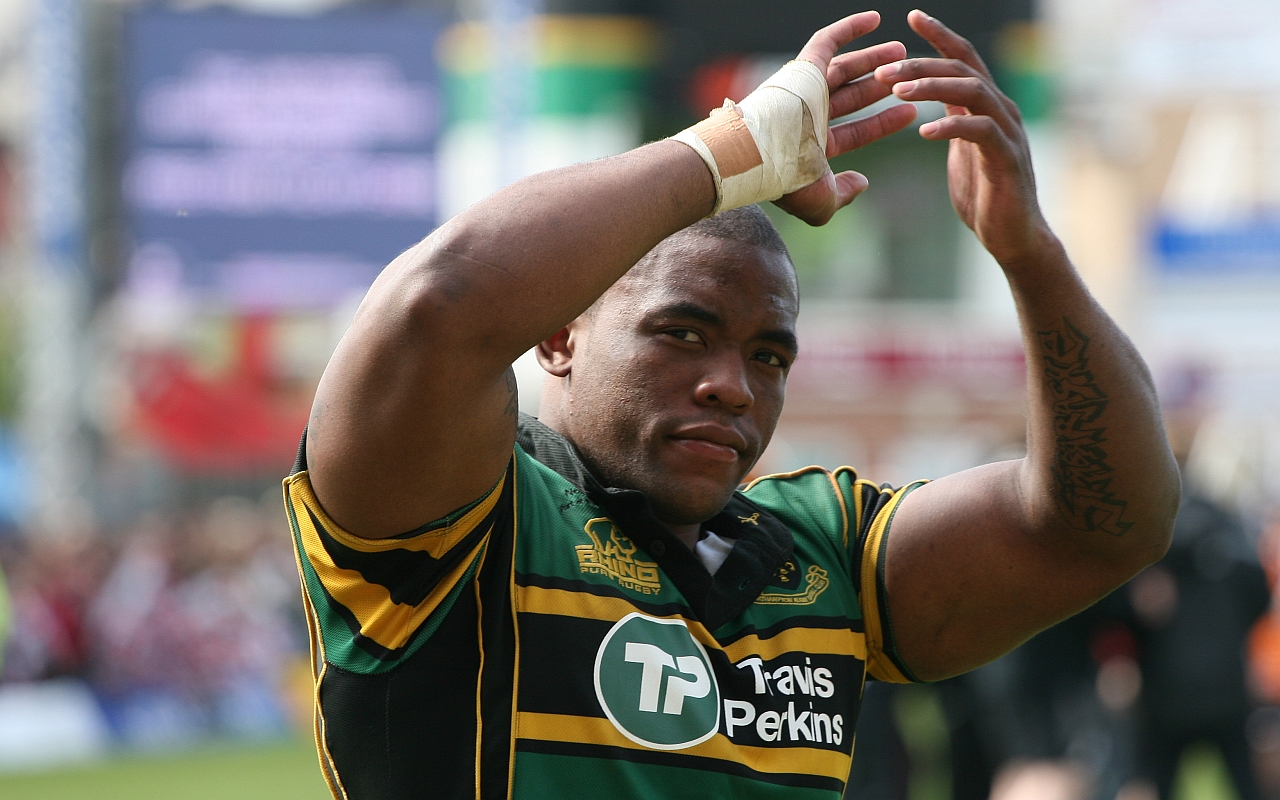
- Born: Brian Mujati; 28 September 1984 (age 42) Bulawayo, Zimbabwe
- Height: 1.81 m (5 ft 11 1/2 in)
- Weight: 118 kg (260 lb; 18 st 8 lb)
- School: Peterhouse Boys' School

Rugby union career
- Position: Prop
Senior career
Years	Team	Apps	(Points)
2009–2013	Northampton Saints	110	(50)
2013–2015	Racing 92	55	(0)
2015–2017	Sale Sharks	35	(25)
2017–2018	Ospreys	7	(0)
- Correct as of 8 May 2017
Provincial / State sides
Years	Team	Apps	(Points)
2006–2008	Golden Lions	7	(0)
2008	Western Province	4	(0)
Super Rugby
Years	Team	Apps	(Points)
2007–2008	Lions	13	(0)
2009	Stormers	22	(0)
International career
Years	Team	Apps	(Points)
2008	South Africa	12	(0)
- Correct as of 17 May 2016

Brian Mujati (born 28 September 1984 in Bulawayo, Zimbabwe) is a Zimbabwean-born retired South African rugby union player who played as a prop.

He started off his career with the Lions in the Super 14 competition, then he joined the Stormers for the start of the 2008 season before joining the Saints. He went to Peterhouse Boys' School in Marondera in Zimbabwe, along with the Sharks and capped Springbok Tendai Mtawarira. Despite having already played for the Springboks Mujati's test career was cut short when he was declared ineligible to play because he was not legally a South African citizen. He opted to join Northampton Saints to further pursue his rugby career. He is still a Zimbabwean citizen.

== Club career ==
=== Northampton Saints ===
Mujati joined Saints in 2009 making his debut at Wembley Stadium. A second-half try for Mujati against Saracens helped the Saints reach the 2009-10 LV= Cup final and by the end of the campaign he was a regular sight on the first team field. The continuation of his fine form into 2010/11 was all the more impressive and he marked himself out as the cornerstone of a formidable Saints pack, featuring in every Premiership and Heineken Cup fixture. After confirming himself as Europe's premium tight-head and a fans favourite to boot, 'Mooj' was voted Players' Player of the Season and selected in the Sky Sports and ESPN Premiership Dream Team. He also finished second only to teammate Tom Wood in the Aviva Premiership Player of the Season vote. Though Brian struggled to find consistency early in 2012/13, his run to form was timed perfectly and he would contribute a semi-final try as the Saints stormed to the Premiership Final at Twickenham.

=== Racing 92 ===
On 27 November 2012, it was announced Mujati would leave Northampton Saints to join French club Racing 92 for the 2013–14 season. Mujati spent two years at the French side. He amassed over 50 caps for the club before signing for the Sale Sharks on a two-year contract in September 2015.

=== Sale Sharks ===
Mujati made his Sale debut in October 2015 in a defeat to Saracens. He scored his first points for the club in a European Challenge Cup match against French side Pau.

=== Ospreys ===
In January 2017, Brian Mujati joined the Welsh Pro12 club Ospreys until the end of the season. On 25 February 2017, he made his debut for Ospreys against Glasgow Warriors in a 26–15 win. On 7 May 2017, Brian signed a contract extension, which was to see him stay at the Ospreys for a second season (2017–2018); however shortly into his second season at the Ospreys Mujati was forced to retire following a shoulder injury .

== International career ==
=== South Africa ===
Despite being Zimbabwean-born Mujati made 12 appearances for the Springboks during the 2008 season prior to leaving for Northampton in 2009.

== Personal life ==
Away from the rugby pitch Brian has proved himself to be a vlogger, with a video channel on YouTube called 'The Life Of Brian'. He is married to Chenesai Mujati and together they have 3 children (2 daughters called Alexandra and Alannah as well as a son called Aaron) . Brian is also a keen brewer and has been making beer for several years.
