= Association of Trust Schools =

School association in Zimbabwe

- ATS Logo
- Abbreviation: ATS
- Formation: 19 October 1962; 64 years ago
- Type: NGO
- Purpose: Educational accreditation
- Region served: Zimbabwe
- Members: 66 schools
- Executive Director: Tim Middleton
- Formerly called: Association of Governing Bodies of Independent Schools in Rhodesia and Nyasaland

The Association of Trust Schools (ATS) is an organisation of independent primary and secondary schools in Zimbabwe that was founded in 1962. Each of these schools are run by their own Board of Governors and are not for profit entities. The Heads of ATS schools are eligible for membership in the Conference of Heads of Independent Schools in Zimbabwe (CHISZ). There are 66 schools in the ATS.

== History ==
In 1962 CHISZ was formed with nine member headmasters: those of Arundel, Bishopslea, Chisipite, Eagle, Falcon, Peterhouse, St. Peter's, Springvale, Whitestone and Bernard Mizeki College. Their purpose was mutual support and encouragement. By the mid-1970s, twenty-four schools attended the Conference. A dip then followed leading up to independence with only nine members attending in 1981. However, the Independence War years had led to a number of member schools closing down, including two of its founder members (Eagle and St. Peter’s), while two other founder member schools closed but did re-open (Whitestone and Springvale).

When government schools opened up to multi-racial classes post-independence, those people who had turned to independent schools chose government schools rather than high fee-paying independent schools as what they were being offered was much the same. However, by 1983, the demand for independent schools had gained pace again – many more new schools were founded, nearly all co-educational schools, while nearly all the founding members of CHISZ had been single-sex schools. In 1983 six new independent schools were started; from 1983 to 1986 nineteen more were founded.

Member schools have received criticism from parents and Zimbabwe government Minister of Education Lazarus Dokora for charging illegally excessive non-refundable acceptance fees and increasing tuition despite "atrocious" academic results.

In 2015, sixty-six schools are members of the ATS, with twenty-four at Secondary level and forty-two at Primary with over 23,000 students enrolled and over 800 teachers employed.

== EXCO ==
EXCO is the Standing Committee of ATS, made up of members of the Conference, elected annually by the members at the AGM.

=== List of EXCO Chairs ===
- Sir Robert Tredgold (1962 – 1968)
- Bob Williams (1969 – 1974)
- Ken Wilson (1975 – 1976)
- Bob Williams (1977 – 1981)
- Dr. Ian MacDonald (1981 – 1982)
- Bob Williams (1982 – 1983)
- Dick Turpin (1983 – 1986)
- Mike Routledge (1986 – 1987)
- Rev. Griffiths Malaba (1987 – 1992)
- Douglas Sagonda (1992 – 1994)
- Stuart Mattinson (1994 – 1997)
- Ant Manning (1997 – 2000)
- David Long (2001 – 2004)
- Jameson Timba (2004 – 2006)
- Mike Manga (2009 – 2010)
- Abe Gatsi (2011 – present)

== List of ATS member schools ==
=== Primary schools ===
- Ariel School
- Barwick School
- Bishopslea Preparatory School
- Bryden Country School
- Carmel Primary School
- Centenary Primary School
- Chisipite Junior School
- Coalfields Primary School
- Dominican Convent Primary School, Bulawayo
- Eaglesvale Preparatory School
- Eiffel Flats Primary School
- Gateway Primary School (Zimbabwe)
- Goldridge Primary School
- Hartmann House Preparatory School
- Hellenic Primary School
- Highveld Primary School
- Hippo Valley Estates Primary School
- Hillcrest Preparatory School
- Kyle Preparatory School
- Lendy Park School
- Lilfordia School
- Lomagundi College Primary School
- Lusitania Primary School
- Masiyephambili Junior School
- Midlands Christian School
- Mubeena Ebrahim Primary School
- Murray MacDougall Primary School
- Mutarazi Primary School
- Mvurachena Primary School
- Petra Primary School
- Portland Primary School
- Riverside Stimulation Centre
- Ruzawi School
- Rydings School
- St. John's Preparatory School (Harare)
- St. Thomas Aquinas Primary School
- Sharon School
- Springvale House
- Tynwald Primary School
- Victoria Falls Primary School
- Westridge Primary School
- Whitestone School

=== Secondary schools ===
- Arundel School
- Bernard Mizeki College
- Chisipite Senior School
- Christian Brothers College, Bulawayo
- Dominican Convent High School, Harare
- Dominican Convent High School, Bulawayo
- Eaglesvale High School
- Falcon College
- Gateway High School (Zimbabwe)
- Girls' College
- Goldridge College
- Hellenic Academy
- Hillcrest College
- Kyle College
- Kutama College
- Lomagundi College
- Masiyephambili College
- Midlands Christian College
- Peterhouse Boys' School
- Peterhouse Girls' School
- Petra High School
- St. Christopher's School, Harare
- St. George's College, Harare
- St. John's College (Harare)
- St. Ignatius College, Zimbabwe
- South Eastern College
- Tynwald High School
- Watershed College
- Westridge High School
- St Peter's Kubatana High School
