= The Convent =

The Convent may refer to:

- The Convent (Gibraltar), the official residence of the governor of Gibraltar
- The Convent (USCA), a housing co-op
- The Convent (1995 film), a Portuguese drama film
- The Convent (2000 film), an American horror film
- The Convent (2018 film), a British horror film
- The Convent (television series), 2006 BBC sequel to The Monastery
- Convent (Mesa), a sandstone butte in Utah

== See also ==
- Convent (disambiguation)
