= Dominican Convent Primary School, Bulawayo =

Dominican Convent Primary School

Location
- 116 Lobengula Street; Bulawayo; Zimbabwe

Information
- Type: Independent, preparatory school
- Motto: Veritas (Latin: Truth)
- Denomination: Catholic
- Opened: 28 October 1895
- Founder: Dominican Sisters
- Headmistress: Sister Irene Makovere OP
- Grades: 1 to 7
- Gender: Girls
- Enrollment: 497 (2015)
- Campus type: Urban
- Houses: 4
- Song: Dominican School Song
- Tuition: US$1000.00 (Note: Termly fees, the year has 3 terms.)
- Feeder to: Dominican Convent High School, Bulawayo
- Affiliations: ATS; CHISZ
- Website: conventprimarybyo.com

Dominican Convent Primary School (also known as Convent or DC) is a Catholic, independent, preparatory day school for girls in Bulawayo, Zimbabwe. The school was founded in 1895 by the Dominican Sisters, laying its claim to being the oldest school in Bulawayo and in Zimbabwe. Initially co-educational, the institution become a girls' school in the 1950s, when St. Thomas Aquinas Primary School was opened to cater for the boys.

Dominican Convent Primary School is a member of the Association of Trust Schools (ATS) and the headmistress is a member of the Conference of Heads of Independent Schools in Zimbabwe (CHISZ).

== Academics ==
The following subjects are offered at Dominican Convent Primary School: Agriculture, Art, English Language, General Paper, Information and Communication Technology, Mathematics and Ndebele Language.

The Grade Seven pupils sit ZIMSEC examinations in English, General Paper, Mathematics and Ndebele, Agriculture, thus ending their primary education.

== Sports ==
Several sporting disciplines are on offer at the school. These are: athletics, basketball, football, hockey, netball, swimming, and tennis.

== Houses ==
There are four houses at Dominican Convent Primary School, namely Saint Dominic, Saint Francis, Saint Joan and Saint Theresa.

The following table shows the list of houses and their colours:

Dominican Convent Houses
Houses	Colour
St. Dominic	Green
St. Francis	Blue
St. Joan	Red
St. Theresa	Yellow

== Clubs ==
Pupils take part in the following extra-curricular activities offered by the following clubs:

- Dance
- Drama
- Knitting and Sewing
- Majorettes
- Torch Bearers
- Wildlife

== See also ==
- Dominican Convent High School, Bulawayo
- List of schools in Zimbabwe
