= Micheen Thornycroft =

Zimbabwean rower

Personal information
- Nickname: Mouse
- Nationality: Zimbabwean
- Born: Micheen Barbara Thornycroft; 26 June 1987 (age 39) Harare, Zimbabwe
- Education: Peterhouse Girls' School; Rhodes University; University of Johannesburg
- Height: 1.75 m (5 ft 9 in)
- Weight: 72 kg (159 lb)

Sport
- Country: Zimbabwe
- Sport: Rowing
- Event: Single scull
- Coached by: Rachel Davis; Roger Barrow

Achievements and titles
- Olympic finals: 2012 Summer Olympics: Women's Single Sculls – Fourteen; 2016 Summer Olympics: Women's Single Sculls – Eleven
- Personal best: 07:30.570 at 2016 Summer Olympics
Medal record
Women's rowing
Representing Zimbabwe
African Rowing Championships
| Gold medal – first place | 2013 Tunisia | W1x |
| Gold medal – first place | 2014 Boukerdane Dam | W1x |
- Updated on 4 April 2016

Micheen Barbara Thornycroft (born 26 June 1987), is a Zimbabwean female rower. Born in Harare, she competed at the 2012 Summer Olympics and the 2016 Summer Olympics in the single scull events for the national team.

Thornycroft's accomplishments in rowing have earned her two nominations for the ANGA (Annual National Sports Award) Sportswoman of the Year Award, in 2013 and 2015.

== Early life and education ==
Thornycroft was born on 26 June 1987 in Harare, Zimbabwe. She has an older sister, Roseanne, and a younger brother, Patrick. Initially home-schooled for Grade One, Thornycroft went to Springvale House, an independent school in Mashonaland East for primary schooling and on to Peterhouse Girls' School, another independent school also in Mashonaland East, for her secondary education. Peterhouse was the school where she began rowing and met her coach, Rachel Davis.

Thornycroft did her tertiary education in South Africa. At Rhodes University in Grahamstown, Eastern Cape, she read human kinetics and ergonomics, and ichthyology and fisheries studies for her undergraduate education. She then did her Honours in ichthyology and fisheries studies. Thornycroft was also president of the Rowing Club and in 2009, she won the Sportswoman of the Year Award at the Rhodes University Sports Council Awards Dinner. Afterward, she went on to do a postgraduate in Teaching at the University of Johannesburg in Johannesburg, Gauteng.

She married fellow Zimbabwean Olympic rower Peter Purcell-Gilpin in 2019 after years of serving as training partners.

== Career ==
=== 2011 ===
In November, Thornycroft qualified for the 2012 London Olympic Games by finishing first in the women's single sculls at the Africa Continental Qualification Regatta held in Alexandria, Egypt. Male counterpart, James Fraser-Mackenzie, also qualified for the Olympics after the finishing second in the Final B race at the same regatta.

=== 2012 ===
In the buildup to the Olympic Games, Thornycroft went on to compete in the Paulo D'Alorja regatta held in Italy, she attained sixth place in Final A race. At the World Rowing Cup II, in Lucerne, Switzerland, (from the 25th-27 May) Thornycroft finished tenth overall. She participated in the 2012 Samsung World Rowing Cup III, held in Munich, Germany (from the 15–17 June) and came first in the Final C race (a non-medal race) and thirteenth overall. At the 2012 Summer Olympics in London, Great Britain, Thornycroft managed to attain fourteenth place overall as she finished second in the Final C race.

=== 2013 ===
In 2013, Thornycroft raced at the World Rowing Cup in Sydney and attained first place in the Final B race (a non-medal race). She had training camps in Italy and Germany before participation at the 2013 World Rowing Championships in Chungju, South Korea where she finished fourth in the Final B race. Micheen won gold at the African Rowing Championships in the single sculls in Tunisia.

=== 2014 ===
In April, Thornycroft came out sixth at the Paulo D'Alorja regatta held in Italy. In June, at the World Rowing Cup II in Aiguebelette, France, Micheen finished second in the Final C race. At the 2014 World Rowing Championships held in Amsterdam, Netherlands, Thornycroft achieved a second-place finish in the Final D race and nineteenth overall. She was one of ten Zimbabwean athletes to receive an Olympic Solidarity scholarship to aid preparations for the 2016 Summer Olympics in Rio de Janeiro, Brazil. Micheen came first in the women's single sculls event at the 10th African Rowing Championships (which ran from 16 to 18 October) held at the Boukerdane Dam in Sidi Amar, Tipaza, a town in northern Algeria.

=== 2015 ===
In a bid to intensify her preparations for the qualifying phase to compete in the 2016 Summer Olympics hosted by Rio de Janeiro in Brazil, Thornycroft moved to Pretoria, the South African capital, so as to train at the High Performance Centre (HPC), at the University of Pretoria, a renowned sport science and training facility. Thornycroft trained under the guidance and coaching of Roger Barrow, South African National Rowing coach credited with coaching the South African M4x (Men's lightweight coxless four) crew that won gold at the 2012 London Olympic Games. Under Barrow's tutelage, Thornycroft set her personal best three times (at the SA Rowing Championships, World Rowing Cup III and the 2015 World Rowing Championships). She won gold at the women's single sculls at the SA Rowing Championships and attained Final B race finishes at the World Rowing Cup III in Lucerne, Switzerland and the World Rowing Championships in Aiguebelette, France where she was fifth and sixth respectively. Micheen came first in the women's single sculls event at the 2015 African Continental Qualification Regatta in Tunis, Tunisia and as a result, qualified for the 2016 Olympics.

=== 2016 ===
In February, Thornycroft participated in the women's single sculls event at the Buffalo Regatta in East London, Eastern Cape, South Africa, where she finished first. In August, she raced at the Olympic Games in Rio de Janeiro, finishing fifth in the B Final, and 11th overall.

== Recognition ==
Thornycroft was nominated for an ANSA (Annual National Sports Award) Sportswoman of the Year Award in 2013, with two other nominees, Cara Black (tennis player) and Rachel Goromonzi (hockey player) also being recognised as deserving of the award. The event was held at the Rainbow Towers Hotel in Harare on 11 December. Thornycroft received a silver medal for the accolade whilst Black and Goromonzi received gold and bronze medals respectively.

In 2015, Thornycroft was again nominated for an ANSA Sportswoman of the Year Award. The other nominees were Kirsty Coventry (swimmer) and Helen Costa Sinclair (bodybuilder). The award show was on 16 December, hosted by the Sports and Recreation Commission at the Rainbow Towers Hotel in Harare. The accolade was given to Helen Costa Sinclair.

In 2017, Thornycroft won the World Rowing Filippi Spirit Award.

== Philanthropy ==
In 2012, Thornycroft was part of a team of rowers taking part in the rowing edition of the Ubunye Challenge. The 24-hour rowing challenge was an initiative expecting to raise £250,000 to finance educational projects in South Africa and Zimbabwe.

== See also ==
- Zimbabwe at the 2012 Summer Olympics § Rowing
- Zimbabwe at the 2016 Summer Olympics § Rowing
