= Edward Norman (historian) =

British historian (1938–2026)

Edward Robert Norman (22 November 1938 – 13 April 2026) was a British ecclesiastical historian and Church of England priest. From 1999 to 2004, he was canon chancellor of York Minster.

== Early life ==
Norman was educated at Chatham House Grammar School, Ramsgate, Kent, and the Monoux School Walthamstow. He went to Selwyn College, Cambridge, on an Open Scholarship.

== Career ==
Norman lectured in history at the University of Cambridge for many years. He was a fellow of Selwyn College (from 1962 to 1964) before moving to Jesus College, Cambridge, to take up a similar position. He was an emeritus fellow of Peterhouse, Cambridge.

He was dean of Peterhouse for 17 years and then dean and chaplain at Christ Church College, Canterbury. He was also professor of history at the University of York. He was a member of the conservative-leaning Peterhouse school of history and was associated with the influential Cambridge Right, along with Roger Scruton and Maurice Cowling. On 7 October 2012, he was received into the Catholic Church by way of the Personal Ordinariate of Our Lady of Walsingham.

Norman was the BBC Reith Lecturer in 1978. For his series of six radio lectures, titled "Christianity and the World", he discussed the relationship between religion and politics. Margaret Thatcher once invited him to Chequers, although Norman insisted he was not a Thatcherite and said he was "appalled by the results of naked capitalism". Norman's book Church and Society in Modern England, published a year after Thatcher's election as Conservative leader, argued that Christianity and conservatism were natural allies based on the moral superiority of the free market. The free market, Norman argued, left individuals responsible for their choices rather than dependent on state welfare, which rendered people "moral cripples". Thatcher exclaimed: "Dr Norman, you are a prophet."

== Death ==
Norman died on 13 April 2026, at the age of 87.

== Writings ==
- The Catholic Church and Ireland (1965)
- The Conscience of the State in North America (1968)
- Anti-Catholicism in Victorian England (1968)
- The Early Development of Irish Society (1969)
- A History of Modern Ireland (1971)
- Church and Society in Modern England (1976)
- "Christianity and Politics" in Maurice Cowling (ed.), Conservative Essays (Cassell, 1978, pp. 69–81.)
- Christianity and the World BBC Reith Lectures (1978)
- Christianity and the World Order Book based on the BBC Reith Lectures (1979)
- Christianity in the Southern Hemisphere (1981)
- The English Catholic Church in the Nineteenth Century (1983)
- Roman Catholicism in England (1985)
- The Victorian Christian Socialists (1987)
- The House of God: Church Architecture, Style and History (1990)
- Entering the Darkness: Christianity and its modern substitutes (1991)
- An Anglican Catechism (2001)
- Out of the Depths (2001)
- Secularisation (2002)
- Anglican Difficulties (2004)
- The Mercy of God's Humility (2004)
- The Roman Catholic Church (2006)
