= Gosho Park =

Protected area in Mashonaland East, Zimbabwe

- Location within Zimbabwe
- Location: Mashonaland East, Zimbabwe
- Nearest city: Marondera
- Coordinates: 18°11′11.58″S 31°38′0.0954″E
- Area: 340 hectares (840 acres; 3.4 km^{2})
- Established: 1984
- Owner: Peterhouse Group of Schools
- Website: www.phg.co.zw/environmental-parks.html

Gosho Park is a conservation area of approximately 340 hectares (840 acres; 3.4 km^{2}) of land on the Springvale Estate (it is adjacent to Peterhouse Girls' School and Springvale House), situated in Mashonaland East, Zimbabwe. The park, named after Patrick Gosho and owned by the Peterhouse Group of Schools, is enclosed by a 2.3 metres (7.5 ft) game fence. The park is an area of Brachystegia woodland with two streams, their associated grasslands and rocky outcrops (some with Bushmen paintings). 237 species of birds have been recorded by the Mashonaland East Birding Group with a variety of Brachystegia species such as the spotted creeper, miombo and rufous-bellied tits. There are 72 species of trees in the area as recorded by the Tree Society.

== History ==
In 1984 Peter Ginn, the well known bird photographer and Geography teacher at Peterhouse Boys' School, approached The United Bottling Company, Mr Daryl Mitchell from Rakodzi farm and several others and a fence was erected. The park comprises land from Rakodzi farm and Springvale Estate. Later on in 1984, a pond was built and some game (nine impalas and several sables) was introduced. It was named after Patrick Gosho, a former Estate Manager at Springvale House with a history of running the Springvale Estate and being Springvale School's first employee.

During the 1980s builders and groups of schoolboys at Peterhouse worked to create roads, trails, picnic sites, the Bush Camp and other facilities. More game was introduced over the years.

== See also ==
- Calderwood Park
- Peterhouse Group of Schools

It was rumoured among the indigenous African Peterhouse Cohort of the late 1980s that Mr Gosho was in fact the rightful owner of the land that now constitutes Gosho Park.
