= Bryden Country School =

- Bryden Country School Badge

Location
- Mashonaland West; Zimbabwe
- Coordinates: 18°07′35″S 30°10′55″E

Information
- Type: Independent, preparatory, boarding and day school
- Motto: Tenacity
- Religious affiliation: Christianity
- Opened: 27 January 1983
- Headmaster: Via Fick
- Grades: 0 to 7
- Gender: Co-educational
- Enrollment: 157 (2015)
- Campus size: 22 hectares (54 acres)
- Campus type: Rural
- Tuition: US$1,960.00 (day); US$2,950.00 (weekly boarding); US$3,450.00 (boarding); (Note: Termly fees, the year has 3 terms.)
- Affiliations: ATS; CHISZ
- Website: brydenschool.com

Bryden Country School (or Bryden) is an independent, preparatory, boarding and day school for boys and girls in Mashonaland West, Zimbabwe. The school was founded in 1983.

Bryden Country School is a member of the Association of Trust Schools (ATS) and the Head is a member of the Conference of Heads of Independent Schools in Zimbabwe (CHISZ).

== History ==
In September 1981, a group of local farmers and businessmen from Chegutu convened to discuss the possibilities of creating a school. Lambourne Farm, of 22 hectares (54 acres) was the site chosen to establish the school. The farm was donated by Mr and Mrs Black on condition that the school be named after Mr Black’s great great grandmother, Jane Bryden.

Bryden Country School was officially opened on 27 January 1983 with Pete Sinclair as the headmaster of the school and an enrollment of seventy children.

== Notable alumni ==
- Rick Cosnett – Film and television actor
- Craig Ervine – Zimbabwean cricketer
- Sean Ervine – Zimbabwean cricketer

== See also ==
- List of schools in Zimbabwe
