= Springvale House =

- The Springvale House Emblem
- Mashonaland East; Zimbabwe

Information
- Type: Independent, preparatory, boarding and day school
- Denomination: Anglican
- Established: 1952
- Oversight: Peterhouse Group of Schools
- Headmaster: Paul Martin
- Gender: Co-educational
- Age: 6 to 12
- Enrollment: 222 (2015)
- Nickname: SVH
- Tuition: US$2,200.00 (day); US$3,600.00 (weekly boarding); (Note: Termly fees, the year has 3 terms.)
- Feeder to: Peterhouse Boys; Peterhouse Girls
- Affiliations: ATS; CHISZ
- Website: www.springvalehouse.co.zw

Springvale House Preparatory School (commonly known as Springvale or Springvale House) is an independent, preparatory, boarding and day school in Mashonaland East, Zimbabwe, that was established in 1952 in what was then Southern Rhodesia. The school shares facilities with Peterhouse Girls on the Springvale Estate of approximately 1,200 acres (490 ha) with Gosho Park, a conservation area on the estate, being adjacent to the two schools. The majority of the pupil population are boarders while the remainder are day scholars.

Springvale House is a member of the Association of Trust Schools (ATS) and the Headmaster is a member of the Conference of Heads of Independent Schools in Zimbabwe (CHISZ).

== History ==
=== Springvale School ===
Springvale School was founded in what was then called Southern Rhodesia by Rev. Canon Robert Grinham and Maurice Carver, the founders of Ruzawi School, in 1952, as a second Anglican junior boys' school in Marondera. The school was born of the desire to cater for the large number of children on Ruzawi's waiting list which grew to 'epic proportions' in 1945. Canon Grinham fought against the proposal to expand Ruzawi's intake as he felt it would hurt the ethos of the school, thus pushing forward the idea of establishing another preparatory school. In 1949, the Ruzawi Board bought 1,000 acres of land for £2 an acre from Jim Blake, the owner of Springvale Farm.

In 1950, Canon Grinham left the headship of Ruzawi School to undertake the new project. His first task was to raise funds for building the school and to assemble a Board of Governors. The board included the likes of the Rt Rev Edward Paget, Winston Field, Howard Smetham, Colonel Ralston and Maurice Carver, with the chairman being Sir Robert Hudson. At the first meeting, the Board was advised that the Registrar of Companies had formally registered "Springvale Ltd" on 2 March 1952. The company was set up under the Anglican Foundation and 100 shares were issued.

Patrick Gosho, after whom Gosho Park is named, was Springvale's first employee. Previously, he was an employee of Jim Blake, running the vegetable growing and beef production arm of Springvale Farm. He joined Springvale in 1951.

The first boys arrived in May 1952 under the headship of Robert Grinham. The boys were temporarily transferred to Ruzawi then returned to Springvale in August. Canon Grinham retired in 1956.

In 1957, John Paterson, the headmaster of St. Andrew's Preparatory School (Grahamstown, South Africa), became the second headmaster of Springvale. He was accompanied by Claude Billington, the school's first chaplain. He oversaw the building of the music block in December 1959 and the establishment of Junior House (a boarding house with classrooms, a dining room and kitchen/laundry facilities, dormitories and a housemaster's residence). The foundation stone for Junior House was laid by Sir Humphrey Gibbs in April 1960.

The 1960s saw major infrastructural developments at Springvale School with new tennis courts, a games room, playing fields, staff flats and a reference library being added, as well as the conversion of the old Form I classroom into a science laboratory. Rugby was introduced in 1961. John Paterson was elected as chairman of the Conference of Heads of Independent Schools. The Springvale Estate matured along with the school as the developments took place.

In 1968, John Paterson retired as headmaster and went to England. He was replaced by Brian Johnson in January 1969. Mr Johnson had taught at Springvale since 1953. The school proudly celebrated its 20th birthday and the Headmaster commented, "The first volume in the History of Springvale is now full. The bills for our upbringing have all been paid. Our Old Boys Association is established. Our first old boy's son is on the waiting list. We look forward to a future full of exciting new opportunities for development [and] I am confident that we shall meet an ever increasing need in the Africa of tomorrow." In January 1973, owing to the increasingly unstable political and security situation in Rhodesia, the border was closed and Express Motorways, a coach company, was forbidden to operate in Zambia thus making it difficult to transport Zambian pupils to the school. The number of Zambian pupils began to drop sharply. In the same year, Michael Hammond, a staff member of Springvale left to become headmaster of Eagle School, a preparatory school for boys in Vumba.

Eagle School was faced with closure due to the war and the drop in students and as a result the 70 remaining pupils were integrated into Springvale School in the second term of 1976. Despite the influx from Eagle, Springvale was ever prey to the external influences of the political and economic state of the country. Mike Hammond was absorbed into the Peterhouse teaching staff across the road, and Headmaster Brian Johnson retired in 1977 and went to England. Before his departure, Mr Johnson welcomed John Stansbury as the new headmaster of Springvale (he was the head of Whitestone School before its closure in 1975).

John Stansbury took over a school whose numbers were declining rapidly. Numbers were down from 150 at the end of 1976 to 102 and dwindled still further in the course of the year. Boys from Zambia and Malawi were being withdrawn as a result of the security situation and by 1979, economic sanctions meant that parents were not permitted to transfer money to pay the school fees. Others were finding places in schools closer to Salisbury. Despite his dedicated efforts to recruit new pupils, the head was in the unenviable position of having to reduce staff numbers as the school scaled down.

The school was desperately in need of financial assistance, and all the fundraising and appeals were simply not enough to keep it viable. Eagle School had brought a debt with them to the school in 1976, which fortunately had been cleared by 1979, but the chief problem was the non-payment of school fees by parents. By 1978 pupil numbers dropped to 50, in 1979 there were just 37 pupils and the school was owed nearly R$20,000 in fees. Many business concerns stepped in to support the school in its most difficult times but the board was forced to close the school at the end of 1979.

=== Hiatus ===
In the hopes that one day the school would reopen, plans were made for its maintenance in the interim. Some equipment was sold off to Peterhouse and to Ruzawi but a great deal of the furniture and fittings, musical instruments, sporting equipment, blankets and linen were put into storage in Junior House. Patrick Gosho moved into the housemaster's flat in Junior House to caretake what remained of the school, which was not confined simply to the school buildings. There was also the large estate to be managed, with its gum tree plantations (which were still economically viable) and St Francis village, the home of the Springvale Estate workers and their families, which had grown up along with the school since the 1950s and had a chapel and a school of its own.

In 1979 Mr. John Hammond was the chairman of the Springvale board and also the chairman of St Philip's School in Guruve. This school, run by the Anglican Diocese, was set in the heart of one of the most troubled areas during the war years and the buildings were burned down during a raid. John Hammond arranged for the St Philip's pupils to move into the then vacant Springvale premises and January 1980 saw a complete change of pupils and teaching staff.

The Beit Trust and the Anglican Diocese provided finance to pay maintenance and caretaking staff. Peter Bradshaw, who had been a teacher at Springvale School, became the liaison link between the remaining Board and Patrick Gosho, paying the ground staff and assisting whenever he could with maintenance and problem solving. In December 1981, the Springvale Board held a meeting to discuss the reopening of the school and the logistics involved. Proper written notice had been given to St Philip's by the Chairman of the Springvale Board before June 1981 to end the lease on December 31, 1982, but unfortunately, in the words of the then Bishop of Mashonaland, the Right Rev'd Peter Hatendi, who later assumed personal responsibility for St Philip's, "the St Philip's board of governors did very little about it and they accepted a new intake in January 1982".

Problems had arisen in the meantime. The chairman, John Hammond, suffered a heart attack and had to resign. The new board of St Philip's built a day school in Guruve, thus leaving the boarders with nowhere to go and the headmaster at the Springvale arm of St Philip's had admitted Form I and Form II pupils, in contravention of the terms of the lease. Although the Springvale board had kept their side of the agreement, permission to reopen was refused by the Ministry of Education and Culture until the St Philip's pupils could be properly accommodated in a boarding school of their own. There was a perception that the St Philip's senior school pupils were being ousted in favour of a more privileged junior school, and the subsequent furore in the press reflected the acrimonious discussions taking place between the Springvale Board of Governors and the Ministry of Education.

By 1983 matters had been resolved, one way or another. Eventually, the Anglican diocese decided to help by building new boarding facilities at Daramombe, a mission school that, like St Philip's, had been closed down during the war. The St Philip's boys could thus be moved en masse and the Anglican diocese expressed their thanks to the Springvale board for permitting St Philip's to stay at Springvale until the Daramombe facilities were ready in the course of 1983.

=== Springvale House ===
Peterhouse, under then Rector Alan Megahey, took over Springvale. In October 1984, Jon Calderwood, headmaster at Hartmann House was appointed headmaster designate. Due to the plans of Dr Megahey, the Main School buildings were given over to Peterhouse, whilst the preparatory school would be based in the Junior House. The school was given a new name, "Springvale House Preparatory School", to align the school with Peterhouse brand.

On the 20th of January 1985, Springvale House was opened with a small gathering celebrating the new term. 93 pupils (boys and girls) in Grades 1-5 were enrolled at the school. Building plans came to fruition as new classrooms, sporting and ablution facilities were built. In 1990, a music room was built in memory of Mark Megahey, the late son of former Peterhouse Rector, Dr Alan Megahey.

In 1994, Jon Calderwood became the head of Peterhouse Girls' School and was replaced by Graham Peebles as the head of Springvale House. In 1994-1995, the Art and Computer Centre was built through the efforts of the Parents and Teachers Association, and in 1996–1997, the dining hall was built. Through the donation of Mr Funnekotter, the Springvale House Museum was built. Plans to enlarge the Chapel of St Francis (made as early as 1997, spearheaded by Jon Calderwood) came to fruition in 2001 when two wings were added, thus creating the shape of a crucifix. The construction of the Sports Centre was completed in 2003, a facility in which various indoor sports are undertaken.

== Emblem ==
The emblem of Springvale is the Jerusalem cross with four additional lines drawn in. The emblem serves to recall that the school was founded on Christian principles. It also brings to mind the four Gospel writers whose work extracts are buried in the original Springvale buildings (now Peterhouse Girls' School).

The plain Jerusalem cross was the emblem of Ruzawi and Springvale adopted it in its adapted form because the school was originally known as 'Ruzawi's younger brother'.

== Cultural activities ==
There are numerous intramural and extramural activities on offer at the school. The activities that were on offer will vary on termly basis.

Notable cultural events on the school calendar are the Eisteddfod, National Allied Arts Competitions, Harare Junior School Choir Concert, Music Concert (mid-year), Carol Concert (Third Term) and the Marondera Schools' Carol Concert.

=== Sports ===
There are various sports offered at Springvale House. These include: Athletics, cricket, cross country, football, hockey, netball, rugby, swimming, tennis.

=== Clubs and activities ===
The clubs and activities at Springvale House include: animal care, arts & craft, ballet, boardgames, chess, Christian Club, Connecting Classrooms, dancing, golf, guitar, gymnastics, hockey skills, horse riding, indoor hockey, marimbas, modelling, needlework, orchestra, rowing, squash, table tennis, taekwondo and triathlon.

== Monitors ==
In 1996, the monitor system was introduced at the school, replacing the traditional prefect system. The aim is to develop the Grade 7 pupils to be leaders under the banner of 'servant leadership'.

== Chapel of St Francis ==
The chapel was built in the early 1950s and is dedicated to Saint Francis, who so inspired Springvale School’s first headmaster, Canon Robert Grinham. It is built of brick, rough plastered and white painted; its internal pillars are gum poles, as are the beams which support the thatched roof. It is a simple building; a no-nonsense expression of the Christian faith.

In 2001, the plan to enlarge the chapel was completed. Two wings were added thus making the building cruciform. The original façade was maintained to be recognisable to former Springvale pupils.

== List of Heads at Springvale ==
Springvale School Heads

- Robert Grinham (1952–1956)
- John Paterson (1957–1968)
- Brian Johnson (1969–1977)
- John Stansbury (1978–1979)

Springvale House Heads

- Jon Calderwood (1985–1993)
- Graham Peebles (1994–2019)
- Paul Martin (2020-present)

== Notable alumni ==
Notable alumni from Springvale School:

- David Hatendi (1967) - banker, Zimbabwe's first black Rhodes Scholar
- Guy Scott (1956) - former Vice President and Acting President of Zambia
- Richard Tsimba (1978) - represented Zimbabwe at the Rugby World Cup in 1991, gained 20 caps for Zimbabwe

Notable alumni from Springvale House:

- Gary Ballance (2001) - England international cricketer
- Sam Curran (2010) - English cricketer for Surrey County Cricket Club
- Tom Curran (2006) - English cricketer for Surrey County Cricket Club
- Murray Faber (2007) - Zimbabwe rower
- Sean Gunn (2005) - Zimbabwe Olympic swimmer
- Andrew Peebles (2001) - Zimbabwe Olympic rower
- Craig Peebles (1999) - Zimbabwe rower
- Micheen Thornycroft (1999) - Zimbabwe Olympic rower
- Sebastian Negri - Italian Rugby player
- Ryan Burl - Zimbabwe cricketer

== See also ==
- Peterhouse Group of Schools
- Peterhouse Boys' School
- Peterhouse Girls' School
- Ruzawi School
- List of schools in Zimbabwe
