= Peterhouse Boys' School =

- Peterhouse Coat of Arms

Location
- Mashonaland East; Zimbabwe
- Coordinates: 18.198°S 31.624°E

Information
- Type: Independent, boarding, high school
- Motto: Conditur in Petra (Latin: It is founded on the Rock)
- Denomination: Anglican
- Patron saint: Saint Peter
- Founded: 1955
- Founder: Fred Snell
- Sister school: Peterhouse Girls' School
- Oversight: Peterhouse Group of Schools
- Rector: Jonathan Trafford
- Forms: I—VI
- Gender: Boys
- Age: 12 to 18
- Enrollment: 449 (2016)
- Education system: English
- Campus type: Rural
- Houses: 6
- Colours: Royal blue and White
- Nickname: Peterhouse Kings
- Tuition: US$5,700.00 (Note: Term fees, the year has 3 terms.)
- Feeder schools: Springvale House
- Affiliations: ATS; CHISZ; HMC
- Alumni: Petreans
- Website: www.peterhouse.co.zw

Peterhouse Boys' School (or Peterhouse) is an independent, boarding high school for boys in Mashonaland East, Zimbabwe. The school was founded by Fred Snell in 1955 and is located on an estate that is shared with Calderwood Park, a conservation area and game park, outside Marondera. The school is one of the schools under the Peterhouse Group of Schools, the other schools being Peterhouse Girls' School, Springvale House Preparatory School and Peterhouse Nursery School. Peterhouse was ranked as one of the Top 10 High Schools in Zimbabwe in 2014. Additionally Peterhouse was ranked as one of the Spears Top 100 Private Schools in The World in 2025.

The Peterhouse Group is led by the Rector, who also has responsibility on a day-to-day basis as Headmaster for Peterhouse Boys' School. The school is a founding member of the Association of Trust Schools (ATS). The Rector is a member of the Conference of Heads of Independent Schools in Zimbabwe (CHISZ) and an international member of the Headmasters' and Headmistresses' Conference (HMC) which represents over 250 independent schools in the United Kingdom and worldwide.

== History ==
In September 1951, Edward Paget, Bishop of Southern Rhodesia, wrote to the Rector of Michaelhouse in Natal, offering him the headship of a school that did not exist. Six months later, Fred Snell started working with Canon Robert Grinham and the Ruzawi School Board toward the creation of an independent senior school. Peterhouse opened in 1955 under the rectorship of Fred Snell with 55 boys and within five years the number had risen to 360 according to plan. Peterhouse was founded as an Anglican boys' country boarding school. When the school opened in 1955, the major building programme had been completed; the Chapel had been dedicated; the staff were accommodated in houses around the grounds; and the grounds themselves had been developed, with the playing fields spreading across the slope below the school, and beyond them, plantations of gum and pine. During the rectorship of Fred Snell, the first black pupils joined the school. Bruce Fieldsend, who joined Peterhouse at the beginning, succeeded Fred Snell as Rector in 1968. Under Bruce Fieldsend, Peterhouse continued to flourish and in 1976, the school had an enrolment of 389 pupils – the highest it had ever been. In 1972, the Rhodesian Bush War had begun to cast a shadow over the land. In 1976 the enrolment began to drop and by the beginning of 1980, Peterhouse was barely half full.

After Independence, the school began to grow again, and in 1984 Bruce Fieldsend was succeeded by the Reverend Doctor Alan Megahey. Under his rectorship not only did the boys' school grow to over 500 pupils, but in 1985, Springvale House, a preparatory school for boys and girls, was opened and in 1987 Peterhouse Girls' School started. These two schools are both situated on the site of the old Springvale School which had closed during the war and which was on the other side of the main Harare / Mutare road from the boys' school. The three schools now occupy a site of 3 000 acres, of which 700 acres are taken up with Gosho Park, Peterhouse's conservation area and Game Park. In 1994, Mike Bawden succeeded Alan Megahey as rector. In 2002, Jon Calderwood was appointed rector after Bawden returned to England. Calderwood was head of Springvale House from 1985 to 1993 and Head of Peterhouse Girls from 1994 to 2001 before he was rector. He retired as rector at the end of 2012. In 2013 Howard Blackett, formerly headmaster of the Royal Hospital School of Ipswich, was appointed rector. Jonathan Trafford, an old Peterhouse teacher and headmaster, took up the position in January 2020.

== Coat of arms ==
On 19 April 1956, Peterhouse was given its name. Then as Fred Snell recorded, much thought and discussion was put into the choice and design of the "Coat of Arms" for the new school. Its name linked it with Michaelhouse, but its symbols the cock, the cross and the crown honoured St. Peter.

== Houses ==
The boys are organised into six boarding houses named after people who were significant in the history of the school or the Anglican Church in Zimbabwe. They are, in order of founding: Ellis House, Paget House, Grinham House, Malvern House, Founders House, Snell House.

Houses at Peterhouse Boys' School
| Houses | Named after | Year founded |
|---|---|---|
| Ellis House | Ellis Robins, 1st Baron Robins | 1954 |
| Paget House | Bishop Edward Paget | 1956 |
| Grinham House | Canon Robert Grinham | 1957 |
| Malvern House | Godfrey Huggins, 1st Viscount Malvern | 1957 |
| Founders House | The founders of Peterhouse | 1959 |
| Snell House | Fred Snell | 1984 |

Each boy is allocated a house upon enrolment, and he remains a member of that house until he leaves. In addition to the houses being buildings in which the boys reside, they compete on a sporting academic and cultural front.

In the late 1980s an additional house, Tinokura was created to house D Block boys (aged 12–14) in their first year at Peterhouse.

== Sport ==
Sporting activities on offer include athletics, basketball, cricket, golf, hockey, rowing, rugby union, soccer, squash, swimming, triathlon, tennis, volleyball, and weight training.

== Activities ==
The cultural activities on offer are (but not limited too): Art Club, Bridge, Chess, Christian Fellowship, Conservation, Dance (both Ballroom and Hip Hop), Debating, Drama, Engineering, Interact Club, Kukura neShungu Club, Leo Club, Music, Photography, Quiz, Social Responsibility, Woodwork, Public Speaking, History Society, Horse Riding etc.

Peterhouse Boys' School offers the Duke of Edinburgh's International Award to boys in C Block (Form 2) upwards.

== Environmental parks ==
The school, for educational and recreational purposes uses Gosho Park, a conservation area named after Patrick Gosho that is owned by the Peterhouse Group which is situated on the Springvale Estate (being adjacent to Peterhouse Girls' School and Springvale House). Geography field trips, Biology research projects and leadership courses are some of the activities that take place in Gosho Park. Calderwood Park, a conservation area opened in 2012 on the Peterhouse Boys' estate is also used by the boys with infrastructural developments in progress.

== Chapel ==
The Peterhouse Boys chapel was built along the lines of Coventry Cathedral in England. The school was named after Peter the apostle.

The foundation stone was laid by the first Archbishop of Central Africa, and one of the school's founders, Edward Francis Paget, in November 1956. The Chapel was dedicated in November 1958 by the then Bishop of Mashonaland (The Right Reverend Cecil Alderson) in the presence of Archbishops Hughes and Paget.

The Chapel seats over 600 and is fitted with an organ; the small pipes in the range were brought into the country by ox wagon in the late 1890s. The full organ was installed in 1966.

== Relationship with Peterhouse Girls' School ==
Peterhouse Girls' School is the sister school of Peterhouse Boys' School. The schools, both owned by the Peterhouse Group, interact in various cultural activities and to a lesser extent in sports. The Fifth Form and Sixth Form are co-educational, with pupils from Peterhouse Girls' having lessons at the boys' school.

== List of rectors ==
List of rectors of Peterhouse Boys School.

- Frederick Snell (1955–1967)
- Bruce Fieldsend (1968–1983)
- Alan Megahey (1984–1993)
- Mike Bawden (1994–2001)
- Jon Calderwood (2002–2012)
- Howard Blackett (2013–2019)
- Jonathan Trafford (2020-present)

== Alumni ==
=== Petrean Society ===
A Petrean is any pupil who has been a member of the school, normally for a minimum of two years; any person who has been a member of the staff of the school for at least three years; or any person who has been a member of the Executive Committee of the school for at least three years.

=== Notable alumni ===
- Gary Ballance (2007) - England International cricketer.
- Peter Beaumont CBE QC (1961) - British barrister and retired judge
- Graham Boynton - author, former travel editor of the Telegraph Media Group
- Stuart Carlisle (1991) - Zimbabwe International cricketer
- Rick Cosnett, actor
- Munyaradzi Chidzonga (2004) - NAMA Award-winning actor, filmmaker, entrepreneur.
- Philip J Day (1972) - British film director, founder of Edge West Productions
- Martyn Day (1973) - British lawyer, founder of Leigh Day.
- Ben Gotting - Rugby union player for London Scottish F.C.
- Scott Gray (1996) - Scotland International rugby player.
- Ken Harnden (1991) - Zimbabwe Olympic hurdler.
- David Hatendi (1972) - former CEO of MBCA and NMB, founder of Hatendi Private Equity Advisors, Rhodes Scholar
- Nyasha Hatendi (1998) - American actor and producer
- Tonderai Kasu (1997) - Substantive Director of Health and Environmental Services for Chitungwiza
- Audius Mtawarira (1995) - multi-ARIA Award winning Australian record producer.
- Tendai Mtawarira (2002) - Professional rugby player with the Sharks. Plays for South Africa at international level since 2008.
- Brian Mujati (2002) - Professional rugby player with the Lions and the Springboks.
- Tawanda Muyeye – cricketer
- Bharat Patel - lawyer, former Attorney General of Zimbabwe
- Andrew Peebles (2007) - Zimbabwean Olympic rower
- Rupert Pennant-Rea (1965) - former Deputy Governor of Bank of England; former editor of The Economist.
- Nicholas Roditi (1963) - British real estate developer and hedge fund manager
- Guy Scott - former Vice President and acting President of Zambia
- Richard Tsimba (1982) - represented Zimbabwe at the Rugby World Cup in 1987, gained 20 caps for his country.
- Jason Wallace (1987) - Costa Book Awards winning author

== See also ==
- Peterhouse Girls' School
- Springvale House
- Peterhouse Group of Schools
- List of boarding schools
- List of schools in Zimbabwe
