= Whitestone School =

Location
- 51 Whitestone Way, Burnside; Bulawayo; Zimbabwe

Information
- Type: Independent, day, preparatory school
- Established: 1942, closed 1975 reopened 1982
- Founder: M. G. Fleming
- Oversight: Whitestone School Trust
- Headmaster: Mr. Khumbu Mafa
- Gender: Co-educational
- Age: 4 to 12
- Enrollment: 510 (2015)
- Colour: US$1,500.00 (Note: Termly fees, the year has 3 terms.)
- Affiliations: ATS; CHISZ
- Website: www.whitestoneschool.co.zw

Whitestone School is an independent, day, preparatory school in for boys and girls in Bulawayo, Zimbabwe.

Whitestone School is a member of the Association of Trust Schools (ATS) and the Head is a member of the Conference of Heads of Independent Schools in Zimbabwe (CHISZ).

== History ==
M. G. Fleming acquired land and opened Whitestone School in 1942. Whitestone was sold by Mr Fleming to Ruzawi Schools Ltd thus being run as an Anglican Diocesan preparatory school for boys. In 1975, the school was closed as a result of the sudden decline in enrollment, due mainly to the removal of many Zambian pupils. In 1978 all movable property was auctioned and the buildings remained empty for partial occupation by pupils and staff of Cyrene Mission during the civil war years.

The Whitestone School Trust was founded in 1981 and the school was purchased from Ruzawi Schools Ltd. It was re-opened in September 1982 as a co-educational school for day and boarding pupils.

== Notable alumni ==
- Keegan Meth - Zimbabwe cricketer
- Daniel Rowland - Zimbabwe long-distance trail runner.

== See also ==
- List of schools in Zimbabwe
