= David Hatendi =

Zimbabwean businessman and banker (1953–2012)

- Born: David Tapuwa Hatendi; 22 May 1953. Marandellas, Southern Rhodesia (modern-day Marondera, Zimbabwe)
- Died: 12 March 2012 (aged 58); Harare, Zimbabwe
- Resting place: Peterhouse Boys' School, Zimbabwe
- Education: Peterhouse Boys' School
- Alma mater: University of Zimbabwe; University College, Oxford
- Occupation: Businessman
- Spouse: Angelina Hatendi (married 1980–2012)
- Children: Natasha Hatendi; Nyasha Hatendi; Sarayi Hatendi

David Tapuwa Hatendi (22 May 1953 – 12 March 2012) was a Zimbabwean businessman, entrepreneur and banker. Hatendi is Zimbabwe's (then Rhodesia) first black Rhodes Scholar.

== Early life ==
Hatendi was born on 22 May 1953 in Marandellas, Southern Rhodesia (today Marondera, Zimbabwe) to Frederick Hatendi and Joyce Hatendi. David's father died when he was 14 thus growing up with his mother and 2 sisters, Susan and Mary. He attended Springvale School and Peterhouse Boys' School where he played rugby and cricket. He graduated from Peterhouse in 1972.

For his tertiary education, Hatendi attended the University of Rhodesia (now the University of Zimbabwe) where he graduated with a BSc (Sociology) in 1976. In 1977, David won a Rhodes Scholarship to attend Oxford University, becoming Zimbabwe's first black Rhodes Scholar. He pursued and attained a Doctorate in Politics at University College, Oxford in 1980. He was involved in various extracurricular activities at University College and the wider Oxford University.

== Business career and interests ==
David Hatendi was employed by Morgan Grenfell and International Finance Corporation. In 1982, Hatendi joined the World Bank after selection into its Young Professionals Programme. From 1991 to 1995, he was an executive director at NM Rothschild.

Hatendi returned to Zimbabwe in 1996 to become the managing director of MBCA Bank Limited, he later on became the chief executive officer. He also became a trustee for Harare International Festival of the Arts from its inception in 1998. In 2004, David became the chief executive officer of NMB Bank Limited when its former directors – Julius Makoni, James Mushore, Otto Chekeche and Francis Zimuto – fled the country during the banking crisis. He resigned from his post at NMB in 2005 three months after it emerged that the bank had been defrauded of over US$6,3 million. David founded the Hatendi Private Equity Advisors, an investment and consultancy firm, in 2007.

In 2009, David Hatendi succeeded David Morgan as the National Secretary to the Rhodes Trust for Zimbabwe, responsible for the Rhodes Scholarship selection process in Zimbabwe.

== Personal life ==
David Hatendi married Angelina Musewe in January 1980 at the University College Chapel, and they had 3 children - two sons (Nyasha and Sarayi) and one daughter (Natasha).

David was a member of White's, an exclusive gentleman's club in London, of which he was the only black member.

== Death ==
On 12 March 2012, Hatendi was found dead, having died in his sleep. It is assumed that he suffered from a heart attack, according to Stanley Hatendi. David Hatendi was buried at the cemetery at Peterhouse Boys' School in Zimbabwe on 15 March 2012. Dr Donald Markwell spoke of Hatendi saying "His was a generous spirit and a powerful mind. He was a lively and entertaining companion, and an immensely warm host. David and Angelina were always a delight to see, both in Oxford and in Harare."

== See also ==
- List of Zimbabweans
- List of Rhodes Scholars
