= Dominican Convent High School, Bulawayo =

Dominican Convent High School

Location
- 116 Lobengula Street; Bulawayo; Zimbabwe

Information
- Type: Independent, day school
- Motto: Veritas (Latin: Truth)
- Denomination: Catholic
- Founded: 1956
- Headmistress: Miss J Moore
- Forms: 1-4, Sixth Form
- Gender: Girls
- Enrollment: 486 (2016)
- Campus type: Urban
- Tuition: US$1,475.00 (Note: Termly fees, the year has 3 terms.)
- Feeder schools: Dominican Convent Primary School
- Affiliations: ATS; CHISZ
- Website: www.conventhighbulawayo.org

Dominican Convent High School (informally referred to as Convent or DC) is a Catholic, independent, day school for girls in Bulawayo, Zimbabwe. The school was founded by the Dominican Order in 1956.

Dominican Convent High School is a member of the Association of Trust Schools (ATS) and the Headmistress is a member of the Conference of Heads of Independent Schools in Zimbabwe (CHISZ).

== See also ==
- List of schools in Zimbabwe
