= St. Thomas Aquinas Primary School =

Location
- Hussar Rd, Khumalo; Bulawayo; Zimbabwe

Information
- Type: Independent, preparatory day school
- Denomination: Catholic
- Established: 1956
- Founders: Dominican Sisters
- Headmaster: Cuthbert Chiromo
- Grades: 0 to 7
- Gender: Co-educational
- Enrollment: 240 (2015)
- Student to teacher ratio: 28:1
- Campus type: Suburban
- Tuition: US$780.00 (Note: Termly fees, the year has 3 terms)
- Affiliations: ATS; CHISZ
- Website: www.stthomasaquinas.ac.zw

St. Thomas Aquinas Primary School is a Catholic, independent, preparatory day school for boys and girls in Khumalo, Bulawayo, Zimbabwe. Founded in 1956 by the Dominican Sisters, the school is now under the oversight of a Board of Governors appointed by the Archbishop of Bulawayo.

St. Thomas Aquinas Primary School is a member of the Association of Trust Schools (ATS) and the Headmaster is a member of the Conference of Heads of Independent Schools in Zimbabwe (CHISZ).

== History ==
St. Thomas Aquinas Primary School was founded in 1956 by the Dominican Sisters as a Catholic school for boys. The Sisters then decided to withdraw from the school in 1979. This led to its purchase by the then Bishop of Bulawayo Adolph Gregory Schmitt. Since then, lay head and staff have been running the school. Overtime, girls were enrolled into the school thus making it co-educational.

== Oversight ==
The school is the under the oversight of a Board of Governors who are appointed by the Archbishop of Bulawayo. The Archbishop is an ex-officio member of the board.

== Sports ==
Sports offered at St. Thomas Aquinas Primary School include:

- Athletics
- Cricket
- Football
- Hockey
- Netball
- Rounders
- Swimming
- Tennis

== See also ==
- List of schools in Zimbabwe
