= Tendai Mtawarira =

Zimbabwean-born rugby union player (born 1985)

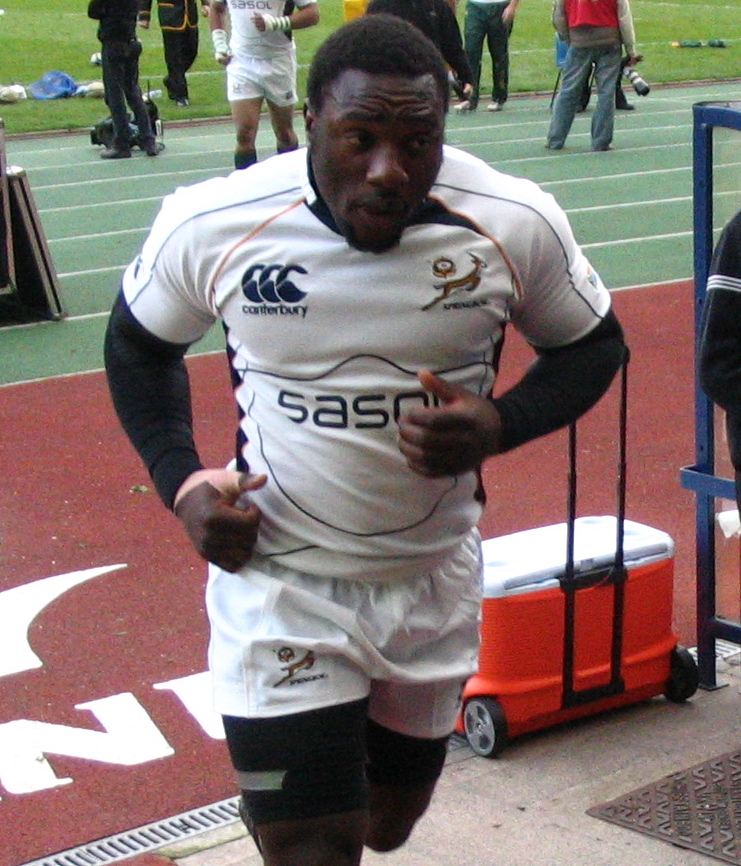
- Mtawarira in 2008
- Full name: Tendai Mtawarira
- Born: 1 August 1985 (age 41) Harare, Zimbabwe
- Height: 1.83 m (6 ft 0 in)
- Weight: 116 kg (256 lb; 18 st 4 lb)
- School: Churchill School; Peterhouse Boys' School
- Occupation: Rugby union player

Rugby union career
- Position: Loosehead Prop
Senior career
Years	Team	Apps	(Points)
2020	Old Glory DC	2	(0)
- Correct as of 5 December 2022
Provincial / State sides
Years	Team	Apps	(Points)
2006–2012	Sharks XV	9	(0)
2010	Sharks Invitational XV	1	(0)
2006–2013	Natal Sharks	37	(15)
- Correct as of 7 July 2019
Super Rugby
Years	Team	Apps	(Points)
2007–2019	Sharks	159	(30)
- Correct as of 7 July 2019
International career
Years	Team	Apps	(Points)
2008–2019	South Africa (tests) (Note: In addition to playing in test matches, Mtawarira featured in a number of non-test matches for South Africa. In December 2010, he played in a match against the Barbarians in London. In 2014 and 2015, he played in non-test international matches against a World XV in Cape Town. These matches have an equivalent status to international tour matches, but were played on home soil. He also played for a Springbok XV that played against the Barbarians in London in November 2016. The South African Rugby Union did not award this match tour match status and no caps were awarded to players that appeared in this match.)	117	(10)
2010	South Africa (tour)	1	(0)
2014–2015	Springboks	2	(0)
2016	Springbok XV	1	(0)
- Correct as of 3 November 2019
Medal record
Men's Rugby union
Representing South Africa
Rugby World Cup
Gold medal – first place	2019 Japan	Squad
Bronze medal – third place	2015 England	Squad

Tendai Mtawarira (born 1 August 1985) is a Zimbabwean-South African retired professional rugby union player who last played for Old Glory DC in Major League Rugby and previously for the South Africa national team and the Sharks in Super Rugby. He was born in Zimbabwe and qualified for South Africa on residency grounds, before later acquiring South African citizenship. Mtawarira, a prop, is known by the nickname Beast.

Mtawarira made his debut for South Africa against Wales on 14 June 2008. With 117 caps, he is the most capped prop in South African history and the fourth most capped Springbok of all time behind Eben Etzebeth, Victor Matfield and Bryan Habana.

With his 117 caps, Mtawarira is the 17th most capped international forward of all time and the 6th most capped prop of all time. He is also a 2019 Rugby World Cup Winner.

He owns a security company in South Africa and a community-based organisation known as The Beast Foundation.

== Early life ==
Mtawarira was born on 1 August 1985 in Harare, Zimbabwe. He attended Churchill School in Harare for five years before being given a full scholarship to Peterhouse Boys' School, an independent school in Mashonaland East. At the age of 15, while at Churchill, he was spotted by Zimbabwean coach Joey Muwadzuri who invited him to join the Under 19 side at the National Schools Festival. Later that year Muwadzuri invited him to be part of Cats and Dogs Rugby Academy Team that won the National Seniors 7's tournament. He played with Dan Hondo, Pete Benade, Tonderai "Kawaza" Chavhanga, among others.

== Playing career ==
After a strong 2008 Super 14 season with the Sharks it was apparent that he had great potential and his speed would be beneficial with the new rules (ELV's).

He was then selected in the Springbok squad and made his debut against Wales on 14 June 2008. At first received limited game time. Later he had the opportunity to be a reserve during the test against the Wallabies in Perth. Once he came on, his impact was significant; he went on to be a part of the starting lineup for all the subsequent Tri-nations tests.

A highlight of Mtawarira's career to date came in the first test of the British & Irish Lions tour in 2009. Scrumming against Phil Vickery, Mtawarira dominated his more experienced opponent, leading to Vickery being substituted after 45 minutes, and a man-of-the-match award for Mtawarira. However, he conceded several penalties in the second test when playing opposite Welsh prop Adam Jones. Similarly, in the third test, Mtawarira was largely ineffectual in the scrum, with the returning Vickery and replacement John Hayes subduing him up front.

On 16 June 2018, Mtawarira played his 100th test match against England. He was dropped to the bench for South Africa's loss to Australia on 8 September 2018, and sustained a neck injury against New Zealand on 6 October 2018, meaning he missed the Springboks' 2018 tour to Europe.

Mtawarira was named in South Africa's squad for the 2019 Rugby World Cup. South Africa went on to win the tournament, defeating England in the final. Mtawarira's scrummaging in the final was described as destructive, and South Africa won many scrum penalties.

As well as his 117 Test matches, Mtawarira has played uncapped games for the Springboks against the Barbarians in 2010 and 2016, and against World XVs in 2014 and 2015. He has also played twice for the Barbarians.

Mtawarira also holds the record for the most Super Rugby caps by a South African with 160 caps.

=== Test Match record ===
As of 3 November 2019

Against	P	W	D	L	Tri	Pts	%Won
Argentina	17	13	1	3	0	0	76.47
Australia	21	10	2	9	0	0	47.62
British & Irish Lions	3	2	0	1	0	0	66.67
England	11	8	1	2	0	0	72.73
Fiji	1	1	0	0	1	5	100
France	6	5	0	1	0	0	83.33
Ireland	7	3	0	4	0	0	42.86
Italy	6	5	0	1	1	5	83.33
Japan	3	2	0	1	0	0	66.67
Namibia	2	2	0	0	0	0	100
New Zealand	20	6	1	13	0	0	30
Samoa	3	3	0	0	0	0	100
Scotland	5	4	0	1	0	0	80
United States	1	1	0	0	0	0	100
Wales	11	9	0	2	0	0	81.82
Total	117	74	5	38	2	10	63.25

Pld = Games Played, W = Games Won, D = Games Drawn, L = Games Lost, Tri = Tries Scored, Pts = Points Scored

=== Test tries ===
Tries	Opposition	Location	Venue	Competition	Date	Result
1	Italy	Cape Town, South Africa	Newlands	Test match	21 June 2008	Won 26–0
1	Fiji	Wellington, New Zealand	Westpac Stadium	2011 Rugby World Cup	17 September 2011	Won 49–3

== Citizenship controversy ==
Although Mtawarira was fully eligible to play for South Africa under IRB rules, his Zimbabwean nationality was a sticking point in 2009 and 2010. South Africa has a policy of only allowing its nationals to represent the country, although it has been somewhat flexible; the South African Rugby Union (SARU) officially cleared him to play with the Boks in the November 2009 Tests, after receiving clearance from the country's sports minister Makhenkesi Stofile.

More recently, his citizenship was a minor political issue in the country. In January 2010, Butana Komphela, an ANC member of the National Assembly and chair of its sports committee, publicly threatened to charge the SARU with "illegally" fielding Mtawarira and have him deported to Zimbabwe. Shortly after the threat, Mtawarira told the Sunday Independent,

I am a South African at heart. I love this country. It has become my home. It is everything to me. Wearing the green and gold of the Springboks is a huge honour for me. That jersey is part of me. The green and gold flows in my blood. I feel just as much pride as any other guy in the team.

Later in the year, the South African government reaffirmed its policy that only South African nationals would be allowed to represent the country in international competition, which made Mtawarira unavailable for selection to the Springboks in the June Tests; by that time, his application for South African citizenship had been tied up in red tape. On 25 June 2010, the SARU announced that Minister of Home Affairs Nkosazana Dlamini-Zuma had granted Mtawarira's request for South African citizenship. The immediate effect was to make him eligible for selection in the 2010 Tri Nations.
