= Edge West Productions =

American film and television production company

Edge West
- Company type: Production company
- Industry: Film & Television
- Founded: 2008
- Founder: Philip J Day
- Headquarters: Santa Monica, CA, United States
- Owner: Philip J Day

Edge West is an American film and television development and production company founded by British producer, Philip J Day, a Peabody Award and Emmy Award winner.

Formed in 2008, Edge West develops and produces movies and television for the US domestic and international markets. In 2022 the company co-produced The Cello an international co-production directed by Darren Lynn Bousman, starring Jeremy Irons and Tobin Bell. In 2019, The Russian Bride, starring Corbin Bernsen and Kristina Pimenova, which Day produced, was chosen to close the Fantasporto International Film Festival, Euroclub (2016) and The Amityville Terror (2016), produced by Philip J Day and Edge West Productions, are distributed by UnCork'd Entertainment.

In 2018 Edge West co-produced with National Geographic a multi-part TV series, 'San Diego: City of Adventure', with Philip J Day as Executive Producer. The company has produced movies, TV series, and documentaries since it was founded.

The company's first production The Real Roswell has been aired regularly since it premiered in 2008. Tunnel to a Lost World was voted 'Best Documentary of the Year' by an audience poll in Turkey, the country where the film was made. In 2009 The Skyjacker That Got Away was the best rated program ever on the long-running series 'Undercover History' for National Geographic.

Edge West has produced three feature films for the international and domestic market, sixteen documentaries and three multi-part TV series for National Geographic Channel. The company produced a one hour special for PBS Inside:Rio Carnivale Edge West also produced a one-hour special, Volcano Timebomb for Curiosity on Discovery Channel, which aired on December 9, 2012.

== Awards ==
The Skyjacker That Got Away is the story of D. B. Cooper, a man who has eluded the FBI for over thirty years. Four of the crew, including Philip J Day, were nominated for an Emmy Award at the 2010 News and Documentary Emmy Awards in the class of Outstanding Individual Achievement: Lighting Direction & Scenic Design.

The company won 13 Telly Awards between 2008 and 2018.

Owner of Edge West, Philip J Day, is a producer and director. His films have been recognized with a Peabody, two Emmy's, five Emmy nominations and eighteen Telly Awards. His series on Lyndon B. Johnson's secret and illegal White House tape recordings began with "Hello Mr President". The long running series "The White House Tapes: Johnson Tapes" won an Emmy Award, three EMMY nominations and a Peabody Award.

== Festivals ==
Edge West's The Russian Bride, starring Corbin Bernsen and Kristina Pimenova, played at the Cinepocalypse Festival in Chicago on June 26, 2018. The movie has been chosen to close the Fanasporto Festival on March 2, 2019.

== Filmography ==
- The Cello (2023) – Independent film
- Patrick Aryee's Wild World (2023) – Sky TV
- Kindred Spirits (2022) – Travel Channel
- Dying to Be Famous: The Ryan Singleton Mystery (2022) – Bounce TV
- Lost in the Wild (2021) – Travel Channel
- The Russian Bride (2020) – Independent film
- Amanda to the Rescue (2019) – Animal Planet
- Stan Lee's Lucky Man (2018) – Sky 1
- San Diego: City of Adventure (2018) – National Geographic
- Off the Map (2018) – Travel Channel
- Inside North Korea: Then & Now (2018) – National Geographic
- Navy SEALs: America's Secret Warriors (2017) – History
- Love Kills (2017) – Investigation Discovery
- The Amityville Terror (2016) – Independent film
- Stan Lee's Lucky Man (2016) – Sky 1
- Euroclub (2016) – Independent film
- Outrageous Acts of Psych (2015) – Science Channel
- Blood Relatives (2015) – Investigation Discovery
- Polar Bear Town (2015) – Smithsonian Channel
- Alaska: The Last Frontier (2013) – Discovery Channel
- Party Like the Rich and Famous (2012) – National Geographic
- Party Like the Queen of France (2012) – National Geographic
- Party Like a Roman Emperor (2012) – National Geographic
- Volcano Time Bomb (2012) – Discovery Channel
- Vanished from Alcatraz (2011) – National Geographic
- Crime Lords of Tokyo (2011) – National Geographic
- Nasca Lines: The Buried Secrets (2010) – National Geographic
- Explorer 25 Years (2010) – National Geographic
- Born to Rage? (2010) – National Geographic
- Great Escape: The Final Secrets (2009) – National Geographic
- The Skyjacker That Got Away (2009) – National Geographic
- Lost Cities of the Amazon (2008) – National Geographic
- Tunnel to a Lost World (2008) – National Geographic
- Inside Rio Carnaval (2007) – PBS
- The Real Roswell (2007) – National Geographic
