= Peterhouse Girls' School =

Peterhouse Girls
- Peterhouse Coat of Arms
- Mashonaland East; Zimbabwe

Information
- Type: Independent, boarding, high school
- Motto: Conditur in Petra (Latin: It is founded on the Rock)
- Denomination: Anglican
- Patron saint: Saint Peter
- Founded: 1987
- Sister school: Peterhouse Boys
- Oversight: Peterhouse Group of Schools
- Headmistress: Claire Hough
- Forms: I—VI
- Gender: Girls
- Age: 12 to 18
- Enrollment: 430 (2016)
- Education system: English
- Houses: Boarding:5; Competitive:4
- Colours: Royal blue and White
- Nickname: Peterhouse Queens
- Tuition: US$5,300.00 (Note: Termly fees, the year has 3 terms.)
- Feeder schools: Springvale House
- Affiliations: ATS; CHISZ
- Alumni: Petreans
- Website: www.phg.co.zw

Peterhouse Girls (or Peterhouse) is an independent, boarding, high school for girls, aged 12–18 in Mashonaland East, Zimbabwe. The school is located on the Springvale Estate of approximately 1,200 acres (490 ha) alongside Springvale House and Gosho Park.

Peterhouse Girls is one of the schools owned the Peterhouse Group of Schools, which also consists of Peterhouse Boys, Springvale House and Peterhouse Nursery School.

Peterhouse Girls is a member of the Association of Trust Schools (ATS) and the Headmistress is a member of the Conference of Heads of Independent Schools in Zimbabwe (CHISZ).

== History ==
When Peterhouse was founded, as a boys-only secondary school, by Fred Snell in 1955, there was no intention of it becoming the Peterhouse Group of Schools (a boys' school, a girls' school and a preparatory school). In the early 1980s, however, it became apparent that there was a demand for the re-opening of Springvale School (under the name Springvale House) and the establishment of a secondary girls’ school.

Springvale House was opened in 1985 and Peterhouse Girls two years later.

Peterhouse Girls admitted 28 pupils in its first year who were accommodated at Springvale House while the girls dormitories were being made ready. At the end of that first year the prime minister of Zimbabwe at the time, Hon. Robert Mugabe stated “I am particularly pleased that you are expanding into the field of girls’ education.... For too long we have tended to think that the education of girls is an expensive luxury”.

The first Headmaster at Peterhouse Girls was Michael Hammond. He set about the task of establishing the new school. By the end of 1993, when he retired, Peterhouse Girls was well established and the first seven cottages on Williams Field had been built. O and A Level exams were being sat and largely passed and fixtures in a wide range of sporting disciplines were being played and largely won.

In 1994, Jon Calderwood (formerly the head of Springvale House) succeeded Michael Hammond as Headmaster.Three more cottages were built on Williams Field; a user-friendly boarding house was built to accommodate the girls of B Block (Form 3); all weather courts were laid down; the Chapel and the Art room were extended and in 2001; as a fitting finale to Jon Calderwood's tenure of office, a new Library was opened. He introduced a tutor system, as was counselling, and courses in the bush and in the mountains were organized – induction courses, adventure courses and leadership courses.

In 2002, when Jon Calderwood was appointed Rector of Peterhouse Boys, he was replaced by Mrs Sue Davidson, the school's first Headmistress. Academic, sporting and cultural success were maintained, even improved; and two laboratories and a striking new Music School were built.

At the beginning of 2010, John Bradshaw was appointed Headmaster following Sue Davidson's retirement. The Board took the opportunity to respond to the increasing demand for places and initiated the expansion programme which is now well under way. To date, three new modern boarding houses have been built and named in honour of the wives of past Rectors and Headmasters associated with Peterhouse and Springvale School; Kathleen House, in memory of Kathleen Grinham, wife of Canon Robert Grinham, founder of Springvale School; Margaret House, in memory of Margaret Snell, wife of Fred Snell, founder of Peterhouse; Elizabeth House, in honour of Elizabeth Megahey, wife of Alan Megahey, who established the Peterhouse Group of Schools. In addition to the expanded accommodation new sporting and teaching facilities have also been built.

In 2015, Tracy Blignaut was appointed Headmistress of the school.

== Coat of arms ==
On April 19, 1956, Peterhouse received its name and coat of arms. According to the school website, the coat of arms incorporated symbols describing and honoring Saint Peter. The crowing cocks symbolize human weakness and Peter's denial. The cross represents courage, faith, self-sacrifice, and fellowship with partner schools. The crown, borrowed from the school flag, represents joy and triumph. The school motto is also displayed, meaning, "it is founded on the rock."

== Houses ==
Peterhouse Girls has 4 competitive houses and 6 boarding houses.

=== Boarding Houses ===
Peterhouse Girls has a horizontal boarding structure and each girl is also placed in one of four competitive houses, not to be confused with the boarding houses.

The boarding houses are:

- Tatanga accommodates girls in D Block (Form 1).
- Kathleen House was named after Kathleen Grinham, wife of Canon Robert Grinham, founder of Springvale School and accommodates the C Block (Form 2) girls.
- Margaret House was named after Margaret Snell, wife of Fred Snell, founder of Peterhouse and accommodates the B Block (Form 3) girls.
- Elizabeth House was named after Elizabeth Megahey, wife of Alan Megahey, who established the Peterhouse Group of Schools and accommodates the A Block (Form 4) girls.
- Williams Field - The senior girls (that is, the Vth Form and VIth Form) move into Vth Form cottages and VIth Form cottages each accommodating 8-16 girls living either in pairs or single room accommodation.

=== Competitive Houses ===
Peterhouse Girls has four competitive houses that compete in areas such as academics, cultural and sporting activities. The houses are

- Eland,
- Impala,
- Kudu and
- Sable.

The competitive houses are named after some of the first animals that were found in Gosho Park. Each House has a Proctor and a Head of House and staff are allocated duties. There are competitions held throughout the year and house points are awarded.

== Sports ==
The sports on offer at Peterhouse Girls include athletics, basketball, cross country, golf, hockey, rowing, soccer, squash, swimming, tennis, volleyball, and water polo.

== Cultural activities ==
Clubs on offer include Art, Bridge, Conservation, Debate Society, Drama, Music, Interact Club, ITC, Leo Club, Scripture Union, Shona Club and Toastmasters.

Peterhouse Girls offers the Duke of Edinburgh's International Award to girls in C Block (Form 2) upwards.

== Environmental Parks ==
The school, for educational and recreational purposes uses Gosho Park, a conservation area named after Patrick Gosho that is owned by the Peterhouse Group which is also situated on the Springvale Estate (being adjacent to the school). Geography field trips, Biology research projects and leadership courses are some of the activities that take place in Gosho Park.

== Chapel of St Francis ==
The chapel was built in the early 1950s and is dedicated to the Saint who so inspired Springvale School's first headmaster, Canon Robert Grinham. It is built of brick, rough plastered and white painted; its internal pillars are gum poles, as are the beams which support the thatched roof.

When the Peterhouse Girls moved into the buildings of Springvale School, which had been forced to close in 1979, it soon became apparent that the chapel would have to be extended. Under the guidance of Jon Calderwood, who had already seen to the installation of a new organ, the extension was planned and executed: two transepts were added, in structure and furnishing identical to the style of the original. In addition, a new altar was built using teak discarded by the boys’ school laboratories; which has been referred as "a rare fusion of the spiritual with the scientific".

== Relationship with Peterhouse Boys ==
Peterhouse Boys is the sister school of Peterhouse Girls. The schools, both owned by the Peterhouse Group, interact in various cultural activities and to a lesser extent in sports. The Sixth Form is co-educational, with pupils from Peterhouse Girls having lessons at the boys' school.

== List of Heads at Peterhouse Girls ==
- Michael Hammond (1987-1993)
- Jon Calderwood (1994-2001)
- Sue Davidson (2002-2009)
- John Bradshaw (2010-2014)
- Tracy Blignaut (2015-2019)
- Claire Hough (2020-present)

== Petrean Society ==
A Petrean is any pupil who has been a member of the school, normally for a minimum period of two years; any person who has been a member of the staff of the school for at least three years; or any person who has been a member of the executive committee of the school for at least three years.

=== Notable Petreans ===
- Micheen Thornycroft - Zimbabwe Olympic rower

== See also ==
- Peterhouse Boys
- Springvale House
- Peterhouse Group of Schools
- List of boarding schools
- List of schools in Zimbabwe
