= Ellis Robins, 1st Baron Robins =

American-born British businessman and public servant

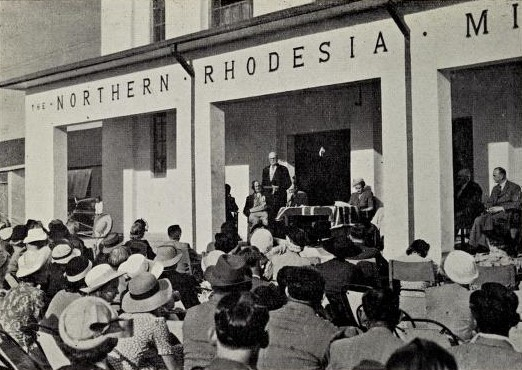
Robins (center) speaking at the opening of a new flour mill in Lusaka, Northern Rhodesia in 1949

Thomas Ellis Robins, 1st Baron Robins KBE, DSO (31 October 1884 – 21 July 1962), known as Sir Ellis Robins between 1946 and 1958, was an American-born British businessman and public servant, mainly based in Rhodesia.

== Background and education ==
Robins was born in Philadelphia, Pennsylvania, United States; the son of Major Robert Patterson Robins, a medical doctor, and Mary Routh Ellis, daughter of Thomas de la Roche Ellis, of Elliston, Louisiana. He was educated at the Bight School, Philadelphia, the University of Pennsylvania, where he was a member of the Philomathean Society, and Christ Church, Oxford, where he was the first Rhodes scholar.

== Public life ==
After a year at Oxford, Robins went to Africa where he joined the British South Africa Company, the company established by Cecil Rhodes, and was entrusted with several important posts in Rhodesia. He became a British citizen in 1912. He fought with the City of London Yeomanry in Egypt, Gallipoli and Palestine during the First World War, was twice mentioned in despatches and awarded the Distinguished Service Order. In 1928, he became general manager of the British South Africa Company, which he remained until 1933, and was then a resident director of the company in South Africa until 1957. He was also a director of the Rhodesia Railway Trust, the Rhodesia Land Bank and the Anglo-American Corporation of South Africa. He commanded the 1st Regiment of the Rhodesia Regiment between 1940 and 1943 and was knighted in 1946, in recognition of his "public services in Rhodesia". He hosted the visit of Queen Elizabeth The Queen Mother to Rhodesia in 1953, the centenary of Cecil Rhodes's birth. He was made a Knight Commander of the Order of the British Empire (KBE) the following year and was raised to the peerage as Baron Robins, of Rhodesia and Chelsea in the County of London, in 1958. Robins was also a freemason.

== Personal life ==
Lord Robins married Mary St Quintin Wroughton, daughter of Philip Wroughton, of Woolley Park, Wantage, Berkshire, in 1912. He died in July 1962, aged 77, when the barony became extinct. The Ellis Robins School, Harare and Ellis House at Peterhouse Boys' School are named after him.

== Arms ==
Coat of arms of Ellis Robins, 1st Baron Robins

Crest
A robin gorged with a necklace of copper beads Proper between two spurs roundels upwards Or.
Escutcheon
Per pale Argent and Sable two flaunches counterchanged a dolphin palewise head downwards affronty also counterchanged between two fleurs de lys each per pale of the first and second.
Supporters
On the dexter side an American bald-headed eagle wings inverted and adorsed Proper semee of mullets of six points Argent and on the sinister side a lion Or.
Motto
Esse Quam Videri
Badge
A robin gorged with a necklace of diamonds Proper.

Peerage of the United Kingdom
New creation	Baron Robins; 1958–1962	Extinct
