= Nicholas Roditi =

British hedge fund manager

- Born: Spencer Nicholas Roditi; August 1945 (age 80)
- Education: Peterhouse Boys' School
- Occupation: Real estate developer
- Known for: Fund manager for George Soros
- Spouse: Pamela
- Children: 1

Spencer Nicholas Roditi (born August 1945) is a British hedge fund manager for George Soros, turned real estate developer. He grew up in Rhodesia (now Zimbabwe).

== Early life ==
Spencer Nicholas Roditi was born in August 1945. He was educated at Peterhouse Boys' School, an independent boarding school on the outskirts of Marondera, in Zimbabwe. He graduated in 1963.

== Career ==
Roditi was George Soros's "most trusted advisor" for some years and ran his Quota Fund and Quasar International, for which he was paid £80 million in 2006.

In April 2015, the Sunday Times estimated his net worth at £1.0 billion

According to The Sunday Times Rich List in 2020, Roditi is worth £2 billion, an increase of £333 million from 2019.

Roditi is a non-executive director of PGI Group.

== Personal life ==
In 1997 he married Pamela, they have a son called James and live in a Georgian house in Hampstead, London. He has an estate in South Africa, about 40 miles from Cape Town.
