= Peterhouse school of history =

The Peterhouse School of History, named after the college of the same name at the University of Cambridge, focused on the study of "high politics" in history. Maurice Cowling, the most prominent member of the Peterhouse school, described this as consisting of the "fifty or sixty politicians in conscious tension with one another". The school and it adherents were associated with the right-wing conservative politics.

Aside from Cowling, historians generally considered to be part of the Peterhouse school have been Michael Bentley, Alistair B. Cooke, John Adamson, Edward Norman and John Vincent. Although some were no longer at Peterhouse and Cowling himself was not comfortable with the label (preferring "Peterhouse Right") these historians, Cowling stated, also "... share common prejudices – against the higher liberalism and all sorts of liberal rhetoric ... and in favour of irony, geniality and malice as solvents of enthusiasm, virtue and political elevation."

The Peterhouse school see politicians making policy decisions with self-interest their primary goal and ideological principles acting as a kind of smoke screen to cover their true intentions or held because they are politically convenient at the time. Peterhouse historians reject biography as, Cowling argues, it "abstracts a man whose public action should not be abstracted" because politicians' actions cannot be properly understood in isolation but only by their interaction with fellow politicians. Cowling also claimed that the Peterhouse school treated Parliament as an instrument of class warfare and that it borrowed from The Spectator's political columnist Henry Fairlie and Robert Blake's central chapters of his The Unknown Prime Minister the realisation of parliamentary politics as "a spectacle of ambition and manoeuvre".

Maurice Cowling believed that the term had been coined by J. J. Lee, a professor at University College Cork but previously a Fellow of Peterhouse. In Cowling's own words:

What Professor Lee meant, however, was not a philosophical position but what he called, with a historian's rancour, the "high-political" works which had been written about the history of nineteenth- and twentieth-century English politics by Professor J.R. Vincent, Dr. A.B. Cooke, Dr. Andrew Jones, and myself in the years between 1965 and 1976.
