= Leo clubs =

Youth organization of Lions Clubs International

Leo Club Program
- Formation: 1957
- Purpose: Youth secular service club social work
- Headquarters: Oak Brook, Illinois
- Members: 200,000 in 140 countries
- Parent organization: Lions Clubs International

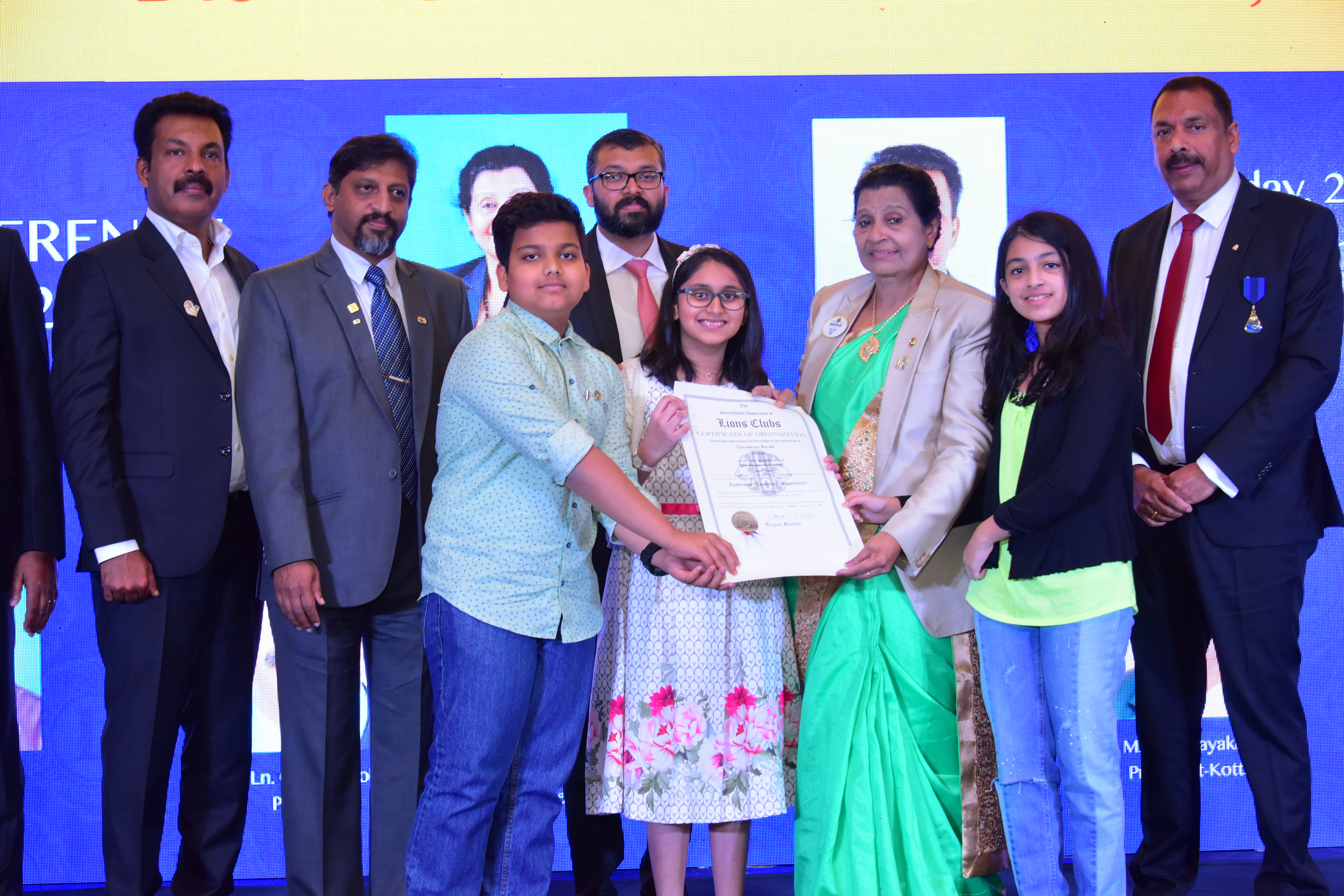
Cheryl Leah Mathew, Charter President of Travancore Royals Leo Club, accepting the Charter of her Alpha Leo Club from District 318B Governor Maggie Jose, issued by Lions Clubs International.

Leo clubs are a youth organization of Lions Clubs International. As of 2025, Leo Club operates in over 140 countries often collaborating with United Nations over impactful projects.

Leo clubs encourage youths to develop leadership qualities by participating in social service activities. They are dependent on a Lions club to sponsor and initiate a Leo club. Leo club members are addressed as "Leos." They conduct various projects in the fields of health care, elders, children, disabled people, literacy and education, and self-development. Leos can raise funds by conducting fund-raising projects. They can conduct projects with another Leo club, sponsoring Lions club, or with an outside organization. Leo clubs are sponsored by Lions clubs and comprise an official program of Lions Clubs International.

== History ==
The first Leo club was founded in 1957 by Jim Graver, the coach of the Abington High School, Pennsylvania baseball team. He was an active member of the Glenside Lions Club. The club was founded with the help of William Ernst, another Lion. It adopted the high school's colors of maroon and gold. The club also created the acronym Leadership, Experience, Opportunity for the word Leo. The word equality was later changed to experience.

In 1964 the Leo Club Program became a sponsored program of the Lions Clubs International. It grew beyond Pennsylvania and the United States of America. By 1967 the program had grown to over 200 clubs in 18 countries and become an official youth program of Lions Clubs International. In the following year, the Leo Club Program spread rapidly, resulting in 918 clubs in 48 countries by the end of 1968.

== Alpha and Omega Leo Clubs ==
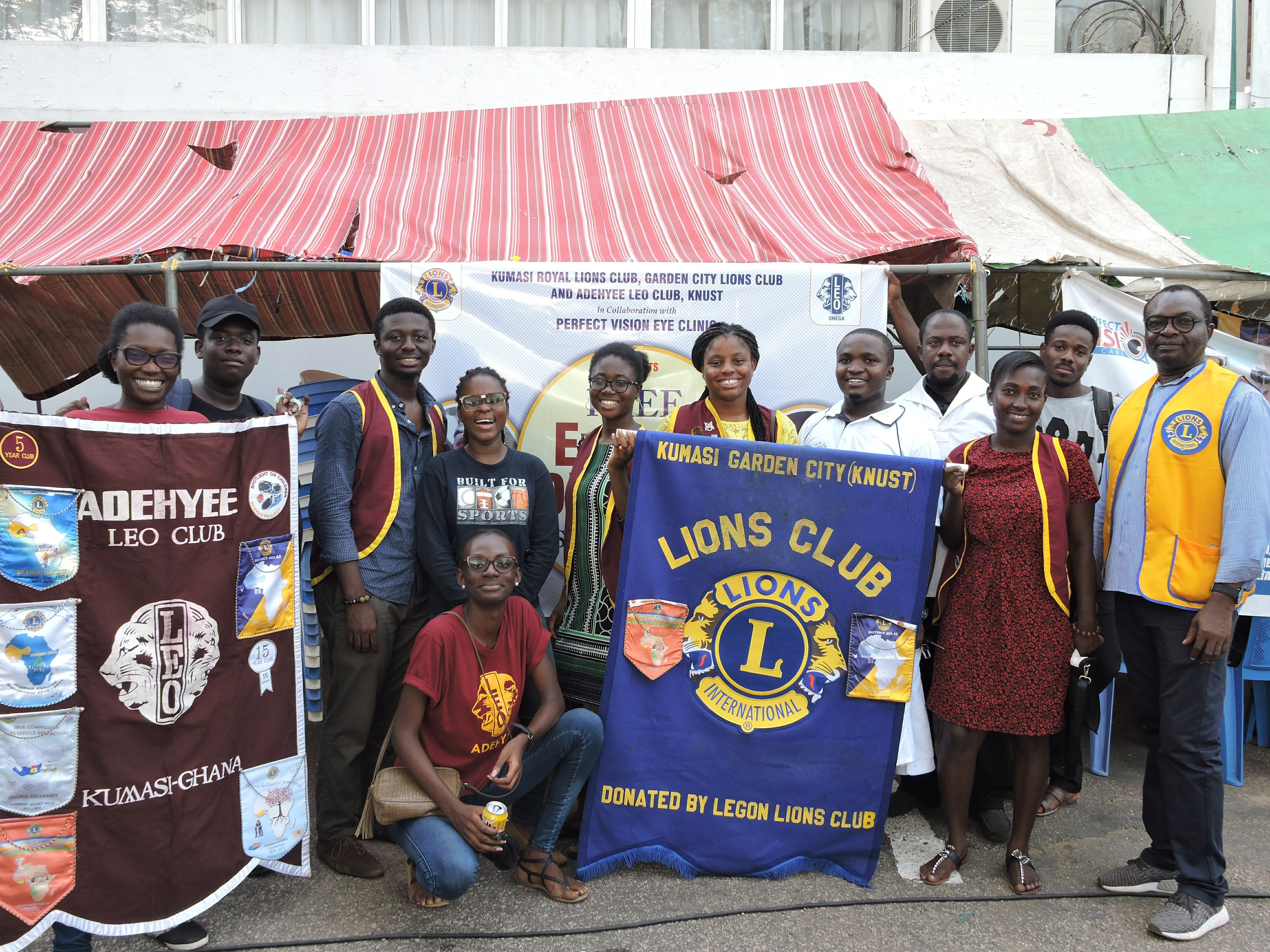
Adehyee Leo Club in Kumasi Ghana posing with sponsoring Lions Club members

There are two tracks of the Leo Club Program. Alpha Leo clubs are those that consist of members between 12 and 18 years of age. Omega Leo clubs are those that consist of members between 18 and 35 years of age.

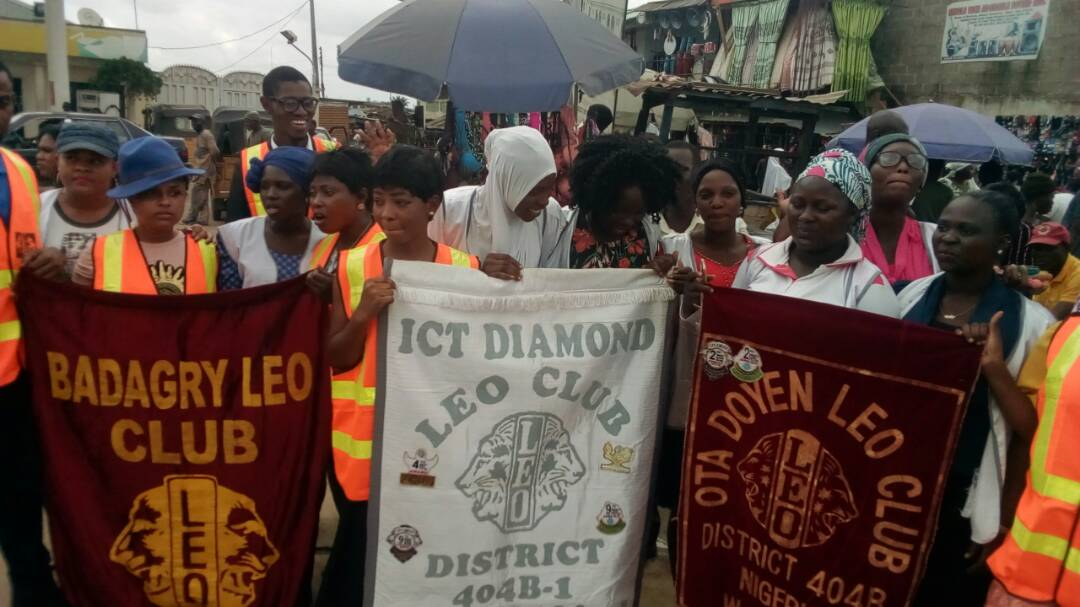
Leo clubs of Nigeria

The Leo Club Program's maximum age of membership is 35 years of age, though it is at the discretion of the Lion's district to enforce younger upper-age limits for Omega clubs. There are no major differences in the operations or logistics of Alpha and Omega Leo Clubs.

== Leos in the 21st Century ==
Leos now number 191,788 members, in over 150 Countries across the world. They also have representation at all Constitutional Area levels with a body called, the Leo Advisory Panel which is a mirror of the International Board of Directors. This has at least 4 representatives from each CA working towards coordinating Leo Club activities in their jurisdictions.
