= Edward Paget (bishop) =

Anglican bishop

Edward Francis Paget (1886 – 21 April 1971) was an eminent Anglican bishop in the middle part of the 20th century.

He was born in 1886 into a clerical family — his father was Francis Paget sometime Bishop of Oxford —, educated at Shrewsbury School and Christ Church, Oxford, and ordained in 1911. His first post was as a curate at St Frideswide's, Poplar after which he emigrated to Southern Africa. Initially Vicar of Benoni he was appointed to the colonial episcopate as the Bishop of Southern Rhodesia in 1925. The diocese was renamed to Mashonaland in 1952 when that of Matabeleland was divided from it; after thirty years as bishop, in 1955, he was additionally elected the inaugural Archbishop of Central Africa. He retired to Gillits in 1957, but came out of retirement to serve as Vicar-General of the Diocese of Johannesburg in late 1960 (the bishop, Ambrose Reeves, had suddenly been deported). A service of thanksgiving for his life was held on 24 May 1971 at the headquarters of the USPG in London. In 1956, a boarding house at Peterhouse Boys School in Marondera was named after him.

Church of England titles
| Preceded by Frederic Beaven | Bishop of Southern Rhodesia; 1925–1952 | Succeeded by himself as Bishop of Mashonaland |
| Preceded by himself as Bishop of Southern Rhodesia | Bishop of Mashonaland; 1952–1957 | Succeeded by Cecil Alderson |
| New title | Archbishop of Central Africa; 1954–1956 | Succeeded by James Hughes |
