= Ruzawi School =

- Ruzawi School Badge

Location
- Marondera, Mashonaland East; Zimbabwe
- Coordinates: 18.2359°S 31.5554°E

Information
- Type: Independent, preparatory, boarding school
- Motto: Learning Knights
- Religious affiliation: Christianity
- Denomination: Anglican
- Established: February 1928
- Founders: Robert Grinham; Maurice Carver
- Oversight: Ruzawi Schools (Pvt) Ltd
- Headmaster: Brendon Brider
- Gender: Co-educational
- Age: 6 to 12
- Enrollment: 231 (2016)
- Houses: Fairbridge, Grenfell
- Song: Ruzawi Anthem
- Sports: 8
- Affiliations: ATS; CHISZ
- Alumni: Ruzawi Old Pupils Association (R.O.P.A)
- Website: www.ruzawischool.co.zw

Ruzawi School is an Anglican, independent, co-educational, preparatory, boarding school for children aged 6 to 12. It is located near the town of Marondera in Zimbabwe. Ruzawi, which was founded by Robert Grinham and Maurice Carver, has a pupil population ranging from 205 to 220 depending on the balance of boys and girls and the number of pupils in each age group. In the Infants' Department there is one class each for Grade One and Grade Two. An additional entry point at Grade Three enables there to be two classes from that level up to Grade 7. The school is situated some five kilometres south of Marondera in extensive grounds surrounded by many hectares of indigenous miombo woodland and exotic eucalyptus plantations.

Ruzawi School is a member of the Association of Trust Schools (ATS) and the Head is a member of the Conference of Heads of Independent Schools in Zimbabwe (CHISZ).

== History ==
In 1926, Robert Grinham and Maurice Carver decided to establish a boys' school in Southern Africa. South Africa was a possible venue but eventually it was decided to establish the school in Zimbabwe (then Southern Rhodesia). Various sites were visited in and around the capital but the most suitable venue was a few miles south of the then village of Marandellas, now Marondera.

The old Ruzawi Inn, for many years a staging post on the carriage and wagon route from the capital to the eastern border, was up for sale. Neither the new road nor the recently built railway passed close to the Inn, which was no longer, an essential stopping place for travelers. The bedrooms, dining room, kitchen and ancillary buildings proved ideal as both accommodation and classrooms for the newly established boys' boarding school. An important use was found for the old stable building close to the inn. It was appropriately converted into the School Chapel. The building, now over a hundred years old, is equally appropriately in use as the School Museum. The founders of Ruzawi enlisted academic and domestic staff to help convert the Inn to a boys' boarding school. At the time, the boys attending Ruzawi ranged in age from seven to fourteen years.

From 1932 to 1934 plans were discussed and finance arranged to replace the old buildings with the present large dormitory block. It became known as the Birchenough Building in recognition of the work Sir Henry Birchenough did on behalf of the school, particularly in the field of raising funds for the new buildings. Other major events in the school's history include the building of the Robert Grinham Hall and the Maurice Carver Music Centre, the establishment of the Computer Centre.

In 1955, the School Chapel was built. The Chapel is a memorial to the Ruzawi boys who died in the Second World War.

In 1978, The Grinham Carver Trust was founded by the Ruzawi Old Boys Association (now the Ruzawi Old Pupils Association) on the occasion of its 25th anniversary and in honour of the school's founders.

In 2003, Ruzawi School became co-educational with the acceptance of girls into the school's student body.

In 2013, Ruzawi became a registered Cambridge International Examinations centre and adopted the Cambridge Primary curriculum.

== Motto ==
The motto is of special interest suggested to us in 1921 by Canon Arthur Davies, Principal of St. John's College, Agra, and later Dean of Worcester. In an old Northumbrian Gospel (circa A.D. 1150) the word disciple does not appear. When any mention is made of the followers of our Lord, the words used are "Learning Knights". It would be difficult to find two words which better define the aim of the Christian life for Prep. School boys. — Ruzawi: The Founding of a School.

== Academics ==
Ruzawi School, alongside the ZIMSEC Primary curriculum, adopted the Cambridge Primary curriculum which was developed by Cambridge International Examinations.

== Sports ==
Ruzawi School offers the following sports: athletics, cricket, cross-country, hockey, netball, rugby, swimming and tennis.

== Clubs and Societies ==
Ruzawi School has the following cultural and extramural activities: Ballet, Conservation Club, Cub Scouts, Design and Technology Club, Golf, Guitar, Music & Drama, Squash, Table Tennis, WildLife Quiz.

== Houses ==
Within the school, students are divided up into two 'houses' that compete along academic and sporting lines. The houses are named Grenfell, represented by olive green and named after Julian Grenfell the first born of William Grenfell – Baron of Desborough; and Fairbridge, represented by light blue and named after Kingsley Fairbridge, a South African educator and statesman. The link between the houses, comes from the apt and fierce competition between Julian and Kingsley at Oxford University in the sport of Boxing.

== Notable alumni ==
- Andy Blignaut - former Zimbabwean cricketer
- Ryan Higgins - former England under-19 cricketer
- Kennedy Tsimba - former Zimbabwean rugby union player
- Guy Whittall - former Zimbabwean cricketer
- Brian John Bennett - current Zimbabwean cricketer

== See also ==
- Springvale House
- List of schools in Zimbabwe
