= List of libraries in Zimbabwe =

This is a list of libraries in Zimbabwe.

== National and government libraries ==
- National Archives of Zimbabwe Library – Harare
- National Free Library – Bulawayo
- Parliament of Zimbabwe Library – Harare
- Zimbabwe National Library and Documentation Service (ZNLDS) – Harare (with branches across the country)

=== Public libraries (municipal/city) ===
- Harare City Library – Harare
- Bulawayo Public Library – Bulawayo
  - Luveve Library
  - Magwegwe Library
  - Mpopoma Library
  - Mzilikazi Memorial Library
  - Njube Library
  - Nketa Library
  - Nkulumane Library
  - Pumula Library
  - Tshabalala Library
  - Marondera Public Library – Marondera
  - Gweru Memorial Library – Gweru
  - Mutare Public Library – Mutare
  - Masvingo Municipal Library
  - Kadoma Public Library – Kadoma
  - Chinhoyi Public Library – Chinhoyi

=== University and academic libraries ===
Institution	Location	State / province	Year established	Library website	Type
Africa University	Mutare	Manicaland Province	1992	https://ict.africau.edu/portfolio/library/	Academic library
Bindura University of Science Education	Bindura	Mashonaland Central Province	1996	https://library.buse.ac.zw/	Academic library
Chinhoyi University of Technology	Chinhoyi	Mashonaland West Province	2005	https://www.cut.ac.zw/cutlib/	Academic library
Great Zimbabwe University	Masvingo	Masvingo Province	2005	https://library.gzu.ac.zw/	Academic library
Gwanda State University	Gwanda	Matabeleland South Province	2016	https://library.gsu.ac.zw/	Academic library
Harare Institute of Technology	Harare	Harare Province	1988	https://www.hit.ac.zw/library/	Academic library
Lupane State University	Lupane	Matabeleland North	2005	Blank	Academic library
Midlands State University	Gweru	Midlands Province	1999	https://libraries.msu.ac.zw/	Academic library
National University of Science and Technology, Zimbabwe	Bulawayo	Bulawayo Province	1991	https://library.nust.ac.zw/	Academic library
Reformed Church University	Masvingo	Masvingo Province	2012	https://rcu.ac.zw/index.php/library/	Academic library
Women's University in Africa	Harare	Harare Province	2002	https://www.wua.ac.zw/library/	Academic library
University of Zimbabwe	Harare	Harare Province	1952	https://library.uz.ac.zw/	Academic library
Zimbabwe Ezekiel Guti University	Bindura	Mashonaland Central	2012	https://zegu.ac.zw/Library/ZEGULibrary	Academic library

=== Special and private libraries ===
- British Council Library – Harare
- American Corner (Embassy Libraries) – Harare and Bulawayo
- Edward Ndlovu Memorial Library – Gwanda
- Mabelreign Library
- Turner Memorial Library – Mutare
- Emmanuel Mission Library – Mashonaland Central
- Mt Pleasant Library Harare
- Greendale Library

=== School libraries ===
- Matopo Secondary Library
- Mtshabezi High School library
- Mzingwane High School Library
- ZIMFEP School Libraries – various rural locations

== See also ==
- Zimbabwe Library Association
- Zimbabwe University Libraries Consortium
