= Promise Mkwananzi =

Zimbabwean politician

President of the Zimbabwe National Student Union
- In office 2006–2007

Secretary for Youth Affairs, MDC Youth Assembly

Personal details
- Party: Renewal Democrats of Zimbabwe (formerly)
- Education: Utrecht University
- Occupation: Politician

Promise Mkwananzi is a politician from Zimbabwe.

== Biography ==
From 2006 to 2007, Mkwananzi was the president of the Zimbabwe National Students Union (ZINASU), and during that time he was expelled from the University of Zimbabwe. He was arrested numerous times for leading student protests against what he and other students viewed as the government's unjust education policies. He was elected into the Movement for Democratic Change (MDC) Youth Assembly as Secretary-General. He was appointed a member of the National Executive Committee as the Secretary for Youth Affairs, making him, at 28, the youngest national executive member in the party's history. A once close ally of Morgan Tsvangirai, Mkwananzi split with Tsvangirai in 2014 and went with former Finance Minister Tendai Biti's renewal group. He split with Biti and joined Elton Mangoma to form the Renewal Democrats of Zimbabwe, where he was briefly Secretary General before he left the party to join the social movement Tajamuka in 2016. He received his education at Utrecht University in the Netherlands where he attained a bachelor's degree in political science and international relations. He also attained a master's degree in international development studies. Mkwananzi is also a fierce advocate of youth autonomy, arguing that the youth should be at the forefront of both the revolution and decision making though financial scandals below set his image a heavy blow. He is widely known for his 'eye for an eye' call in which he rallied the youth to retaliate against violence from ZANU PF youths. Mkwananzi lives in Harare, Zimbabwe.

== Attempted arrest ==
On 17 June 2007, Harare police confiscated the passport of the President of the Movement for Democratic Change, Arthur Mutambara, raided the house of the vice-chairperson of the Students Christian Movement of Zimbabwe, Lawrence Mashungu, and injured the Student Representative Council President of Great Zimbabwe University, Whitlaw Tanyanyiwa Mugwiji, so badly that he had to be hospitalized. A few days later on 20 June 2007, police allegedly injured his relatives in Waterfalls and Glen Norah after they told the police Mkwananzi did not live with them anymore in an attempt to arrest them. Mkwananzi said he believed that they were trying to prevent him from travelling to Europe for the Save Zimbabwe Campaign. Prior to the 2013 elections Mkwananzi was cautioned by Morgan Tsvangirai along with Solomon Madzore to desist from hate speech.

== Tajamuka and looting scandals ==
On 16 June 2016, the #Tajamuka protest movement was launched in Zimbabwe and Promise Mkwananzi came out as its spokesperson. On 2 October 2017, he was accused by multiple anonymous donors of "abusing thousands of dollars mobilized to bankroll the social movement’s activities". On 3 October 2017, Mkwananzi resigned amid pressure from fellow activists. Allegations of corruption during his days as MDCT Youth Secretary also emerged, as he was accused of having looted USD 75,000 of funds meant for youth programs. He has also been accused of working with Vice President Emmerson Mnangagwa's (ZANU PF) Lacoste faction.
