= Church University =

Church University may refer to:

- Canterbury Christ Church University, a public research university located in Canterbury, Kent, England
- Church University (Salt Lake City), a former LDS Church operated university in Salt Lake City, Utah, USA
- Church University Berlin, a former theological university in Berlin, Germany
- Reformed Church University, a university in Masvingo, Zimbabwe
