= List of National Monuments of Zimbabwe =

This article contains a list of National Monuments of Zimbabwe as defined by the National Museums and Monuments of Zimbabwe

Monument Number	Name of Site	Description	Year of Gazetting	Site Type	Site Category	Region	Province	District	Coordinates	Image
1	Victoria Falls		E.N 485 1937	Geological	Natural	Western	Matabeleland North	Wankie		
2	Great Zimbabwe Ruins		E.N 485 1950	Dry Stone Walls	Archaeological	Southern	Masvingo	Masvingo		
3	Naletale Ruins		E.N 485 1937	Dry Stone Walls	Archaeological	Central	Midlands	Insiza		
4	World's View		E.N 485 1967	Pioneer Memorial	Historical	Western	Matabeleland South	Matobo		
5	Danamombe Ruins		E.N 485 1937	Dry Stone Walls	Archaeological	Central	Midlands	Insiza		
6	Khami Ruins		E.N 485 1986	Dry Stone Walls	Archaeological	Western	Matabeleland North	Bulawayo		
7	Bambata Cave		E.N 485 1973	Rock Painting	Archaeological	Western	Matabeleland South	Matobo		
8	Nswatugi Cave		E.N 485 1973	Rock Painting	Historical	Western	Matabeleland South	Matobo		
9	Sinoia Caves		E.N 485 1937	Historic Integrity	Natural					
10	Rhodes Nyanga Estate		E.N 485 1937	Iron Age & Stone Age	Archaeological					
12	Punewe Falls		E.N 485 1937	Scenic	Natural					
13	Shangani Battle Field		E.N 485 1937	Memorial	Historical			Bubi		
14	Macardon Claims		E.N 638 1937		Archaeological			Gwanda		
15	Trias Hill		E.N 255 1938		Archaeological			Inyanga		
17	Old Fort Victoria 2		E.N 485 1938	Pioneer Memorial	Historical	Southern	Masvingo	Masvingo		
18	Echo Farm Paintings		E.N 255 1938 amended E.N 1961	Stone Age and Iron Age	Archaeological	Northern	Harare			
19	Silozwane Cave		E.N 485 1974	Rock Painting	Archaeological	Western	Matabeleland South	Matobo		
20	Gulubahwe Cave		E.N 485 1974	Rock Painting	Archaeological	Western	Matabeleland South	Gwanda		
21	Makumbe Cave		E.N 485 1949	Rock Painting	Archaeological	Northern	Mashonaland Central	Goromonzi		
22	Somerby Cave		E.N 255 1938	Rock Painting	Archaeological	Northern	Mashonaland West	Harare		
23	Borrowdale Farm		E.N 255 1938	Rock Paintings	Archaeological	Northern		Harare		
24	Murehwa Cave		E.N 86 1939	Rock Painting	Archaeological	Northern	Mashonaland East	Manehwende T.T.L		
25	Mutoko Cave/ Ruchero		E.N 86 1939	Rock Painting	Archaeological	Northern	Mashonaland East	Mutoko		
26	Girraffe Petroglyph		E.N 86 1939	Rock Art	Archaeological	Northern	Mashonaland East	Mutetengwe		
27	Thomas Moodies Grave		E.N 86 1939	Memorial	Historical			Melseter		
28	Big Tree		E.N 86 1939		Natural			Mt Selinda		
29	World's View Farm		E.N 247 1939	Rock Painting	Archaeological	Western	Matabeleland South	Matobo		
31	Matendera Ruins		E.N 378 1939	DryStone Walls	Archaeological	Eastern		Buhera		
32	Dengeni Cave		E.N 379 1959	Rock Painting	Archaeological	Southern	Masvingo	Zaka		
33	Pongo Memorial		E.N 461 1940	Historical Building	Historical			Insiza		
34	Fort Hill Penhalonga		E.N 488 1940		Historical		Manicaland			
35	Chidrida Forest		E.N 588 1940	Sacred Forest	Historical			Chirinda		
36	Halfway Half Ruin		E.N 144 1941 amended 1949	Historical Building	Archaeological			Lupane		
37	Chitungwiza Fort		E.N 694 1948		Archaeological	Northern	Harare			
38	Indaba Tree		E.N 86 1941	Pioneer Memorial	Historical	Eastern	Manicaland	Mutare		
39	Mzilikazi Memorial		E.N 10 1942	Ndebele site	Historical	Western	Matabeleland South	Matobo		
40	Muromo Rock Paintings		E.N 10 1942	Rock Painting	Archaeological	Eastern	Manicaland	Mutare		
41	Mzilikazi's Grave		E.N 469 1965	Ndebele Site	Historical	Western	Matabeleland South	Matobo		
42	Mutowa Ruins		E.N 469 1942	Zimbabwe Ruin	Archaeological	Western	Matabeleland North	Hwange		
43	Hillside Dams		E.N 469 1943	Rock Painting	Archaeological	Western	Matabeleland South	Bulawayo		
44	Mjelele Cave		E.N 541 1942	Rock Paintings	Archaeological			Matobo		
45	Jumbo Ancient Workings		E.N 421 1943	Iron Age	Archaeological	Northern	Mashonaland Central	Mazowe		
46	Ewanrigg Aloe Gaderns		E.N 51 1943	Scenic	Natural			Salisbery		
47	Old Jesuit Mission		E.N 213 1943	Pioneer Memorial	Historical	Western	Matabeleland South	Bulawayo		
48	Lobengula's Grave		E.N 8 1945	Ndebele Site	Historical	Western	Matabeleland North	Hwange		
49	Memorial Cross		E.N 8 1945	Pioneer Memorial	Historical	Eastern	Manicaland	Mutare		
50	Mangwe Fort		E.N 8 1945	Pioneer Memoria	Historical	Western	Matabeleland South	Matobo		
51	Rupisi Hot Spring		E.N 212 1945	Scenic	Historical			Melseter		
52	Surtic Farm		E.N 715 1945	Rock Painting	Archaeological	Northern	Mashonaland Central	Mazowe		
53	Ziwa Ruins		E.N 236 1946	Nyanga Ruin	Archaeological	Eastern	Manicaland	Nyanga		
54	Bunea Forest		E.N 38 1946	Sacred Site	Natural			Umtali		
55	Blakiston-Routelge Memorial		E.N 39 1946	Pioneer Memorial	Archaeological	Northern	Mashonaland Central	Mazowe		
56	Filabusi Memorial		E.N 212 1946	Pioneer Memorial	Historical	Western	Matabeleland South	Filabusi		
57	Mambo Memorial		E.N 1946	Pioneer Memorial	Historical	Western	Matabeleland North	Bubye		
58	Rixon Memorial		E.N 1947	Pioneer	Historical			Fort Rixon		
59	Bumboosi Ruins		E.N 1947	Zimbabwe Ruin	Archaeological	Western	Matabeleland North	Hwange		
60	Gambarimwe		E.N 1949	Rock Painting	Archaeological	Northern	Mashonaland East	Mutoko		
61	Mutoko Ruins		E.N 1949	Zimbabwe Ruins	Archaeological	Northern	Mashonaland East	Mutoko		
62	Chumnungwa Ruins		E.N 1949	Zimbabwe Ruin	Archaeological	Southern	Masvingo	Mberengwa		
63	Rhodes Indaba Tree		E.N 1949	Pioneer Memorial	Historical	Western	Matabeleland South	Matobo		
64	Diana's Vow		E.N 120 1959	Rock Painting	Archaeological	Eastern	Manicaland	Rusape		
65	Mhakwe Cave		E.N 120 1950	Rock Painting	Archaeological	Northern	Mashonaland East	Marondera		
66	Two Cypress Trees		E.N 544 1953		Historical	Northern		Salisbury		
67	Fort Inewenya		E.N 632 1953	Pioneer	Historical	Central		Gwelo		
68	Ntabazikamambo Ruins		E.N 569 1952	Zimbabwe Ruin	Archaeological	Central	Midlands	Shangani		
69	Mahaka Fort		E.N 805 1952	Portuguese Fort	Historical	Northern	Mashonaland East	Mutoko		
70	Hangwa Forts		E.N 912 1952	Portuguese Fort	Historical	Northern	Mashonaland West	Makonde		
71	Fort Umlugulu		E.N 1953	Pioneer Memorial	Historical	Western	Matabeleland South	Matopo		
72	Harleigh Farm Ruins		E.N 1954	Zimbabwe Ruin	Archaeological	Eastern	Manicaland	Rusape		
73	Harare Toposcope		E.N 1954	Pioneer Memorial	Historical	Northern	Harare	Harare		
74	Chamavara Cave		E.N 1954	Rock Painting	Archaeological	Southern	Masvingo	Masvingo		
75	Ancient Park		E.N 247 1957	Rock Paintings	Archaeological			Lomagundi		
76	Bridal Veil Falls		E.N 4 1954	Geological	Natural	Eastern	Manicaland	Chimanimani		
77	Empandeni Mission		E.N 4 1958		Historical			Bulalima-Mangwe		
78	Rhodes Summer House		E.N 4 1956	Pioneer Memorial	Historical	Western	Matabeleland South	Matobo		
79	Rhodes Stable		E.N 75 1956	Pioneer Memorial	Historical	Western	Matabeleland South	Matobo		
80	Lobengula's Indaba		E.N 75 1958		Historical			Bulawayo		
80	Kasekete Ruins		E.N 1957	Zimbabwe Ruin	Archaeological	Northern	Mashonaland Central	Guruve		
81	Zvongombe Ruins		E.N 1957	Zimbabwe Ruin	Archaeological	Northern	Mashonaland Central	Centenary		
82	Chisvingo Ruins		E.N 1957	Zimbabwe Ruin	Archaeological	Northern	Mashonaland Central	Bindura		
83	John Lee's House		E.N 1957	Pioneer Memorial	Historical	Western	Matabeland South	Bulalila-mangwe		
84	Cave of Hands		E.N 1957	Rock Painting	Archaeological	Western	Matabeleland South	Matopo		
85	Mbagazewa		EN 1957	Iron Age	Archaeological	Northern	Mashonaland Central	Guruve		
86	Khami Water Works		E.N 1958	Iron Age	Archaeoogical	Western	Matabeleland North	Bulawayo		
89	Rhodes Hut		E.N 1958	Pioneer Memorial	Historical	Western	Matabeleland South	Matobo		
90	Lobengula's Indaba Tree		E.N 1958	Ndebele Site	Historical	Western	Matabeleland South	Matobo		
91	Manemba Cave		E.N 130 1958	Rock Painting	Archaeological	Northern	Mashonaland East	Mutoko		
92	Hartley Hill Fort		E.N 282 1958	Pioneer Memorial	Historical	Northern	Mashonaland West	Chegutu		
93	Chiwona ruins		E.N 390 1958	Zimbabwe ruin	Archaeological	Eastern	Manicaland	Buhera		
94	Fort Tuli		E.N 464 1959	Pioneer Memorial	Historical	Western	Matabeleland South			
95	Fort Martin		E.N 611 1959	Pioneer Memorial	Historical	Northern	Mashonaland West	Chegutu		
96	Fort Rixon		E.N 611 1959	Pioneer Memorial	Historical	Central	Matabeleland South	Insiza		
97	Inyathi Mission		E.N 611 1959	Pioneer Memorial	Historical	Western	Matabeleland North			
98	Fort Gibbs		E.N 373 1960	Pioneer Memorial	Historical	Central	Midlands	Lalapanzi		
99	Nyahokwe Ruins		E.N 404 1960	Nyanga Ruin	Archaeological	Eastern	Manicaland	Nyanga		
100	Tsindi Ruins		E.N 448 1961	Zimbabwe Ruin	Archaeological	Northern	Mashonaland East	Marondera		
101	Muchuchu Ruins		E.N 3 1961	Zimbabwe Ruin	Archaeological	Eastern	Manicaland	Buhera		
102	Kagumbudzi		E.N 3 1961	Zimbabwe Ruin	Archaeological	Eastern	Manicaland	Buhera		
103	Charewa		E.N 412 1961	Rock Painting	Archaeological	Northern	Mashonaland East	Mutoko		
104	Missionary Tree		E.N 438 1961	Pioneer Memorial	Historical	Western	Matabeleland South	Matobo		
105	Umvutcha Village		E.N 438 1961	Ndebele Site	Historical	Western	Bulawayo	Bulawayo		
106	Mutema Sacred		E.N 776 1961	Sacred Shrine	Historical			Chipinge		
107	Bembesi Laager Site		E.N 541 1961	Pioneer Memorial	Historical	Western	Matabeleland South			
108	Fossil Dinosaur		E.N 27 1962	Palaeontological	Natural	Western	Matabeleland North	Nyamandlovu		
109	Battle of Bembesi		E.N 29 1962	Pioneer Memorial	Historical	Western	Matabeleland South	Insiza		
110	Kamwahuku Fossil Forest		E.N 623 1964	Palaeontological	Natural	Northern	Mashonaland West	Hurungwe		
111	Luanze Earthworks		E.N 628 1967	Portuguese Fort	Historical	Northern	Mashonaland East	Mutoko		
112	Chikupo Cave		E.N 689 1965	Rock Painting	Archaeological	Northern	Mashonaland Central	Bindura		
113	Griniteside Site		E.N 760 1965		Archaeological			Salisbury		
114	Regina Ruins		E.N 83 1966	Zimbabwe Ruin	Archaeological	Central	Midlands	Insiza		
115	Chibvumani Ruins		E.N 83 1966	Zimbabwe Ruin	Archaeological	Southern	Masvingo	Bikita		
116	Old Bulawayo		E.N 706 1966	Ndebele Site	Historical	Western	Matabeleland South	Bulawayo		
117	Luanze Church		E.N 191 1965	Portuguese Fort	Historical	Northern	Mashonaland East	Mutoko		
118	Selous' House		E.N 357 1967	Pioneer Memorial	Historical	Western	Matabeleland South	Mzingwane		
119	Mac Dougal, Weir Canals and Tunnel		E.N 163 1968		Historical			Chiredzi		
120	Kongezi Ruins		E.N 362 1968	Zimbabwe Ruins	Archaeological	Western	Matabeleland South			
121	Fort Mazowe		E.N 199 1969	Pioneer Memorial	Historical	Northern	Mashonaland Central	Mazowe		
122	Amadzimba Cave		E.N 433 1969	Rock Painting	Archaeological	Western	Matabeleland South	Matobo		
123	Old Fort Victoria 1		E.N 761 1969	Pioneer Memorial	Historical	Southern	Masvingo	Masvingo		
124	Mutota's Ruin		E.N 762 1969	Zimbabwe Ruin	Archaeological	Northern	Mashonaland Central	Guruve		
125	Chiwawa's Ruin		E.N 762 1969	Zimbabwe Ruin	Archaeological	Northern	Mashonaland Central	Guruve		
126	Matanda aChiwawa		E.N 762 1969	Zimbabwe Ruin	Archaeological	Northern	Mashonaland Central	Guruve		
127	Mabokisi Fossil Forest		E.N 762 1969	Palaeontological	Natural	Northern	Mashonaland East	Guruve		
128	Stromatolite		E.N 116 1969	Geological	Natural	Western	Matabeleland North			
129	Striproad/ Lukosi		E.N 997 1969		Historical			Wanki		
130	Melfort Strip Road		E.N 57 1970	Pioneer Memorial	Historical	Northern	Mashonaland East	Goromonzi		
131	Lundi Strip Road		E.N 58 1970	Pioneer Memorial	Historical	Western	Masvingo	Chivi		
132	Horse Trough		E.N 247 1970	Pioneer Memorial	Historical	Western	Bulawayo	Bulawayo		
133	Matopos Railway Terminus		E.N 523 1970	Pioneer Memorial	Historical	Western	Matabeleland South	Matobo		
134	Trek Memorial		E.N 720 1970		Historical			Melsetter		
135	Pandamatenga		E.N 721 1970		Historical			Wanki		
136	Orbicular Granite		E.N 985 1970	Geological	Natural	Western	Matabeleland South	Mzingwane		
137	Majiri Ruins		E.N 109 1971	Dry Stone Wall	Archaeological	Southern	Masvingo	Masvingo		
138	Coach House and Stables		E.N 169 1971	Pioneer Memorial	Historical	Western	Bulawayo	Bulawayo		
139	Flag tree and Wason's store		E.N 334 19971		Historical			Bulawayo		
140	Mother Patrick's Mortuary		E.N 361 1971	Pioneer Memorial	Historical	Northern	Harare	Harare		
141	Crocodile Man Paintings		E.N 415 1971	Rock Painting	Archaeological	Northern	Harare	Harare		
142	Bridge Paintings		E.N 416 1971	Rock Painting	Archaeological	Northern	Harare	Harare		
143	Settler Tree		E.N 1037 1971	Pioneer Memorial	Historical	Eastern	Manicaland	Mutare		
144	Mangwe Memorial		E.N 214 1972	Pioneer Memorial	Historical	Western	Matabeleland South	Bulalila-mangwe		
145	Fossil forest		E.N 728 1972		Geological			Gokwe		
146	Kaguvi Stronghold		E.N 829 1972	Shona Site	Historical	Northern	Mashonaland West	Chegutu		
147	Fort Mhondoro		E.N 830 1972	Pioneer Memorial	Historical	Northern	Mashonaland West	Chegutu		
148	Mashayamombe Village		E.N 831 1972	Shona Site	Historical	Northern	Mashonaland West	Chegutu		
149	Musimbira Ruins		E.N 312 1973	Zimbabwe Ruin	Archaeological	Southern	Masvingo	Bikita		
150	Paper House		E.N 389 1973	Pioneer Memorial	Historical	Central	Midlands	Kwekwe		
151	Dambarare		E.N 522 1973	Portuguese Fort	Historical	Northern	Mashonaland Central	Mazowe		
152	BSA Co Lion		E.N 689 1973	Pioneer Memorial	Historical	Western	Bulawayo	Bulawayo		
153	Bembezana Suspension Bridge		E.N 61 1974	Historic building	Historical	Central	Midlands	Gweru		
154	Telegraph Office Site		E.N 1974	Pioneer Memorial	Historical	Northern	Mashonaland Central	Mazowe		
154	Telegraph Office		E.N 757 1974	Technical	Historical		Mash Central	Mazowe		
155	Forty Alderson		E.N 758 1974	Pioneer Memorial	Historical	Northern	Mashonaland Central	Mazowe		
156	McDougall House		E.N 86 1975	Pioneer Memori	Historical	Southern	Masvingo	Chiredzi		
157	Cecil House		E.N 693 1976	Pioneer Memori		Northern	Harare	Harare		
158	Geological Unconformity		E.N 1976	Geological	Natural	Central	Midlands	Zvishavane		
159	Nanke cave		E.N 1976	Rock Painting	Archaeological	Western	Matabeleland South	Matopo		
160	Utopia House		E.N 1977	Pioneer Memorial	Historical	Eastern	Manicaland	Mutare		
161	Impali		E.N 1986	Rock Painting	Archaeological	Central	Midlands	Shurugwi		
162	Old Stock Exchange		E.N 1986	Historical	Historical	Central	Midlands	Gweru		
163	Old Magistrate's Court		E.N 1986	Historical	Historical	Central	Midlands	Gweru		
164	Sibizini Grain Bins		E.N 1986	Iron Age	Archaeological	Western	Matabeleland South	Mzingwane		
165	Kopje House		E.N 1986	Pioneer Memorial	Historical	Eastern	Manicaland	Mutare		
166	Tohwechipi's Grave		E.N 1986	Shona Site	Historical	Eastern	Manicaland	Buhera		
167	Freedom Arch		E.N 1988	Ind. Memorial	Historical	Northern	Harare	Harare		
168	Chiremba Balancing Rocks		E.N 1994	Geological	Natural	Northern	Harare	Harare		
169	Nharira Hills		E.N 2000	Shona Site	Historical	Northern	Mashonaland West	Norton		
170	Upper Mazowe Valley		E.N 2007	Cultural/Intangible	Historical	Northern	Mashonaland Central	Mazowe		
171	Manicaland Provincial Heroes Acre		E.N 2007	Liberation Heritage	Historical	Eastern	Manicaland	Mutare		
