= Zengeza 1 High School =

Location
- Chitungwiza, Harare Province, Zimbabwe; P.O. Box ZG50; Zimbabwe
- Coordinates: 18°00′21″S 31°3′10″E

Information
- Type: Secondary School Mixed School
- Motto: A wise man thinks ahead
- Established: 1979; 47 years ago
- Staff: 90 teachers
- Enrollment: 2000 pupils
- Affiliation: Catholic Church

Zengeza 1 High School is an urban, day coeducational secondary school in Chitungwiza, Harare Province, Zimbabwe. It has a student population of 2000 pupils and 90 teachers who enroll in two sessions. It has 10 classes for each grade from form 1 to form 4, and 3 classes at advanced level categorized as Sciences, Commercials and Arts.

== History ==
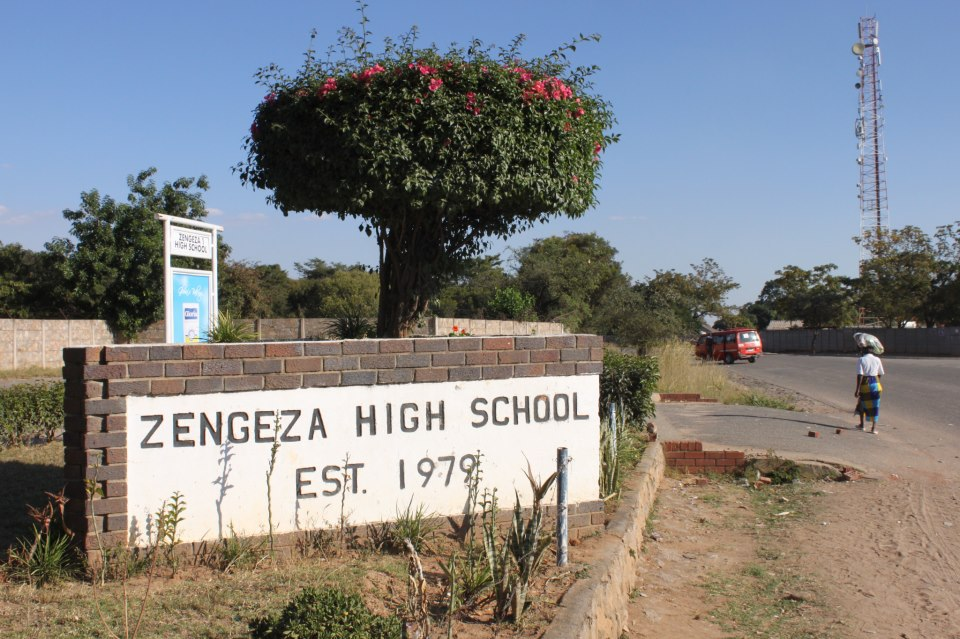
welcome to Zengeza high school

Zengeza high school was established in 1979 by the Zimbabwean government previously known as Southern Rhodesia. It is located in Zengeza district, Chitungwiza. It was named "Zengeza High school" after the place the school is located. There are 3 other high schools in this district also named "Zengeza" but they are differentiated by numbers i.e. Zengeza 2 High School, Zengeza 3 High School and Zengeza 4 High School. Typically, local people call Zengeza high school as Zengeza 1 High School (Zengeza number 1 high school). Of these four "Zengeza" schools, Zengeza high and Zengeza 2 high are the two schools that offer enrolment for Advanced level, and Zengeza High School is the only "Zengeza" School that offers Science subjects (Physics, Chemistry, and Biology) at Advanced level. It was officially opened on 8 August 1980. It is run by the School Development Committee (SDA) which acts as an interface for parents and the school administration. Zengeza High School is one of the high schools in Zimbabwe which caters for students with disabilities. The special needs class was officially opened in 2013 with the aim of protecting and promoting the right to education for students with special needs and disabilities. In 2010 the school introduced e-learning after they secured a partnership with a local computer company who provided them with huge plasma screens that enhances e-learning. The school also benefited from former Zimbabwean President Mugabe’s schools computerisation programme that helped the school to increase the number of computer facilities. The school built a new Library and a computer lab which was officially opened by the former Minister of Information and Publicity, professor Jonathan Moyo in 2003.

== Academics ==
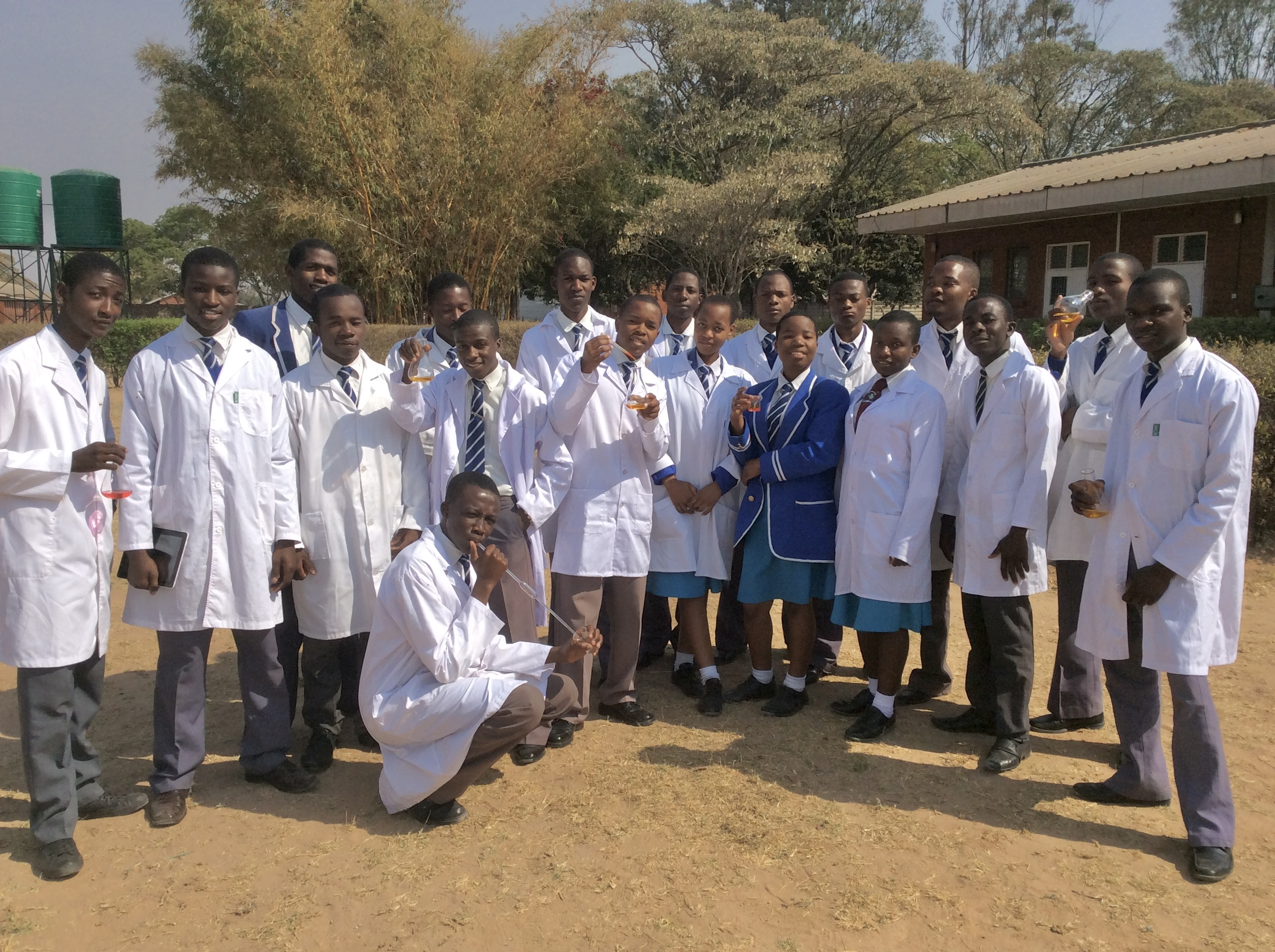
Advanced level Chemistry students

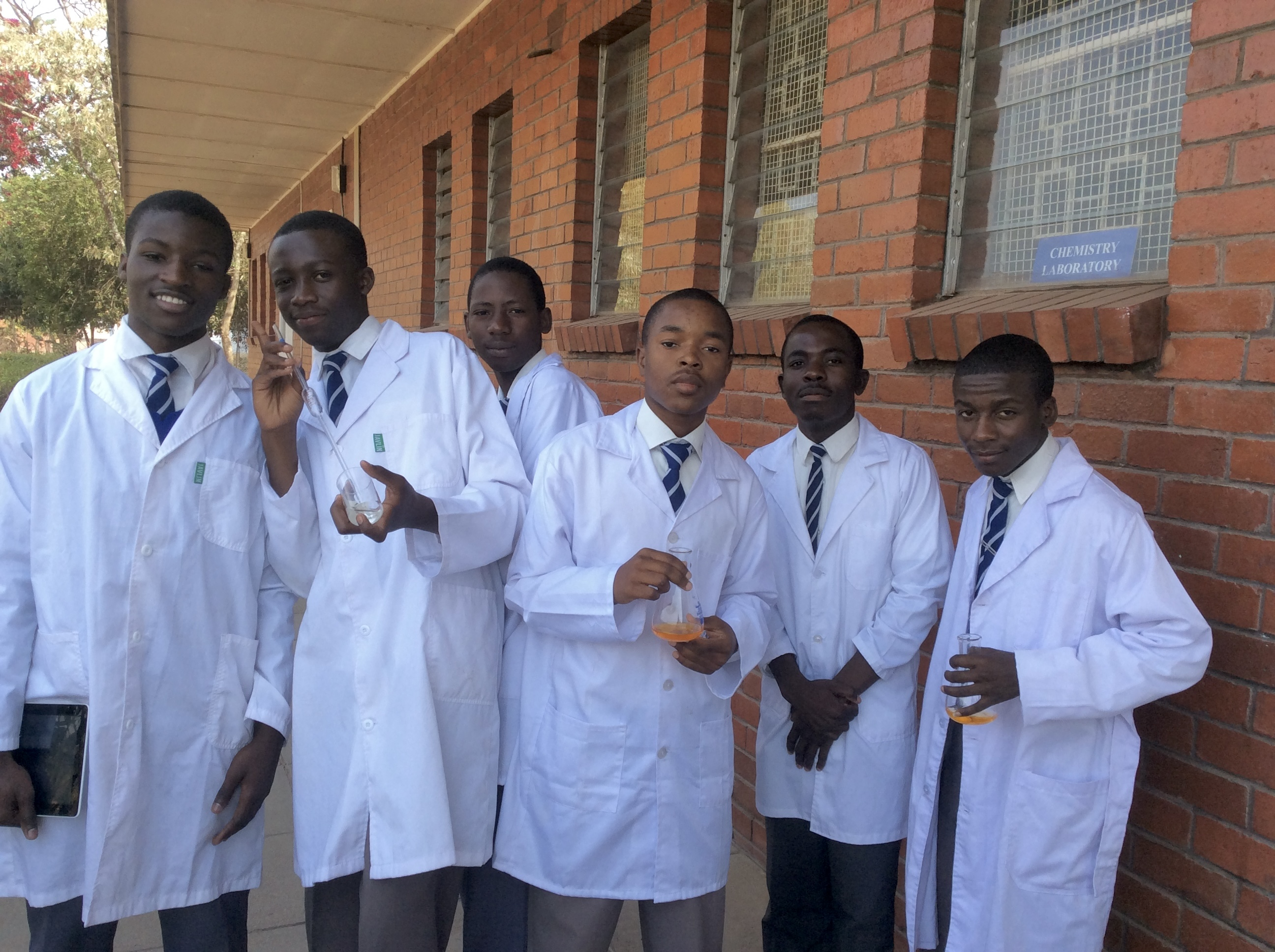
Science students after conducting chemistry practical

Zengeza high School follows the syllabus of the Zimbabwe school examination Council (ZIMSEC) for GCE Ordinary level and Advanced Level. They offer subjects that include English Language & Literature, Shona, Integrated Science, Accounts, Mathematics, Practical Subjects such as Computer Studies, Biology, Physics, Chemistry, Technical Graphics, Agriculture, Fashion and Fabrics. Zengeza high's students won in the Essay writing competitions like the Potraz Essay writing competition and the Sadc essay competitions. In 1998 and 2008, Zengeza High school won the Secretary's bell, an award for academic excellence given by Ministry of Education for the best school in each province. In 2011 Zengeza high's Advanced level racked 100% pass rate and was ranked 8th best Schools in Zimbabwe. In 2013, it was placed on 42nd in the list of Zimbabwe best high schools based on Zimsec Advanced level results. In 2014, Zengeza's 99 students sat for the GCE A level examinations. The outcome of the school's Advanced level pass rate was 95.96%, and it was ranked the 60th position in the ‘A’ level top 100 schools. In this year's Old Mutual National Quiz 2018, Zengeza is one of the three schools in the Harare province who has students progressed to the finals.

== Recruitment ==
To enter form one, students must have at most 10 units depending on the year's pass rate. It has 10 classes that range from class A to class K with the exception of class I. Students with the best primary level results( 4 units) are placed in class A while others are placed in the respective classes that follow, depending on their results. Students are re-screened after writing form 2(two) end of year exams. The results will determine whether a student is able to take science subjects(physics and chemistry) or should take more of business courses e.g. business studies. As for the lower sixth(form 5) intake, for a student to be considered for a place, he/she must have at least 3 ‘A’ grades at GCE Ordinary Level. Students with at least 8(eight) ‘A’ grades are enrolled as Sciences students while those with few ‘A's are enrolled as Arts students.

== Extracurricular activities ==
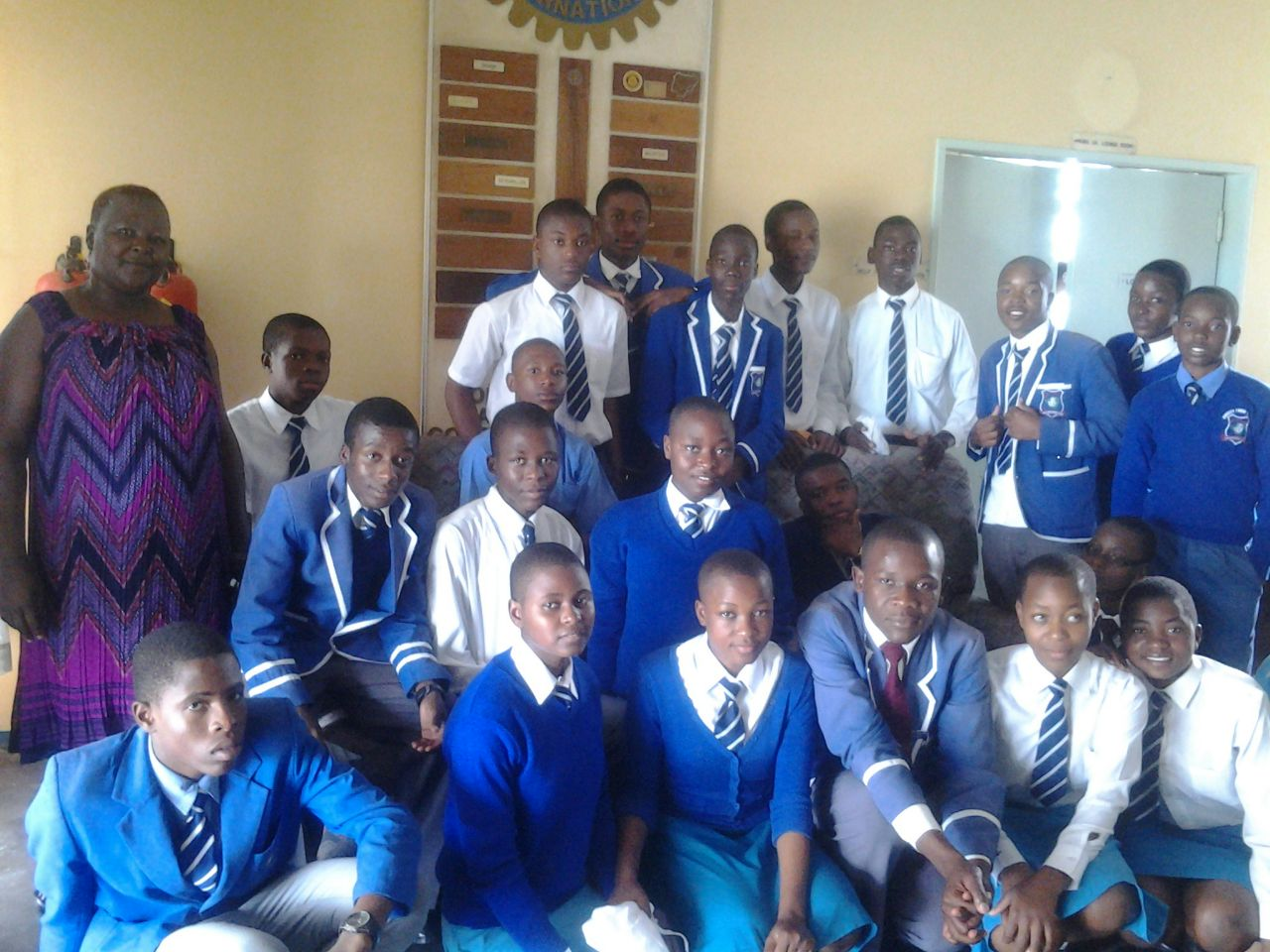
School's Interact club

Zengeza high school participates in various extra-curricular activities that include, soccer, rugby, basketball, volleyball, handball and has school clubs that include public speaking and debate, choir, chess, drum majorettes, quiz and science club. The quiz club came out in second place at the Zimbabwe Schools Quiz (2016) provincial finals held at Oriel Girls High. In the same year 2016, the Chess club won awards at Gokomere chess festival which was held on 18 June at Gokomere High School in Masvingo where they won all of their five games. In 2011, the school's drum majorettes were the best at the Zimbabwe International trade fair held in Bulawayo and also were the top Harare school at the Harare Agricultural show for at least five times. After winning awards in the regional, provincial and national choral music competitions, Zengeza High school's choir has become one of the notable high school choirs which sings highly entertaining and spiritually uplifting gospel songs. In 2002, the school's choir participated in the National Choral Music Competitions and won the Best African Traditional Award in the choral music category.

== Location ==
Zengeza high school is located at number 6001 Mukomberanwa Drive, Zengeza 2, Chitungwiza, Harare Zimbabwe. Using Google Earth for the aerial view, it is found on the Coordinates 18.01°S, 31.05°E

== See also ==
- List of schools in Zimbabwe
