= Tafadzwa Chitokwindo =

Zimbabwean rugby player

Tafadzwa Chitokwindo is a retired Zimbabwean international rugby player. He was known for his speed.

== Early life ==
Tafadzwa Chitokwindo was born in Harare, Zimbabwe, in 20 September, 1990. He is the oldest of the three children in his family. Growing up in Bulawayo and in Masvingo, he attended at Victoria High School in Masvingo in forms one to four, then moved to Kyle College. He represented Masvingo Province at the Zimbabwe National Youth Games in the 100m, 200m, long jump, triple jump and 110m hurdles. He was then selected to represent Zimbabwe in South Africa in 2008 for the Coca-Cola Craven Week.

== Rugby career ==
In 2010 he was part of the Zimbabwe Young Sables team in the 2010 IRB Junior World Rugby Trophy in Russia. He scored three points with one drop.

Later in 2010, Chitokwindo played for the Sables (Zimbabwe national rugby union team) against Kenya in the Victoria Cup. At the end of 2010 he played for the Zimbabwe Cheetahs at the Dubai Sevens. Chitokwindo was admitted to Rhodes University in Grahamstown, South Africa in 2011, where he played for the university on the first rugby team. In April 2014 he graduated with a Bachelor of Commerce Degree majoring in Economics and Management. In September 2014 he was on trial at the German club TV Pforzheim, with whom he reached the Rugby-Bundesliga final. As of 2015 he weighed 72 kilograms (159 lb) and was 1.78 metres (5 ft 10 in) tall. He plays wing.

== International play ==
In international play, as of mid-2015 Chitokwindo had scored:

| Season | Competition | Points | Games | Starts | Tries |
|---|---|---|---|---|---|
| 2011–12 | IRB 7 World Cup | 5 | 4 | 1 | 1 |
| 2011–12 | George (South Africa) | 20 | 24 | 11 | 4 |
| 2011–12 | Dubai (United Arab Emirates | | 3 | | |
| 2011–12 | George (South Africa) | 5 | 5 | | 1 |
| 2012–13 | IRB 7 World Cup | 5 | 4 | 1 | 1 |
| 2012–13 | George (South Africa) | 5 | 6 | 1 | 1 |
| 2013–14 | George (South Africa) | | 5 | 5 | |
| 2014–15 | George (South Africa) | 10 | 5 | 5 | 2 |
