= Zimbabwe Library Association =

Professional library organisation in Zimbabwe

Zimbabwe Library Association (ZimLA)
- Abbreviation: ZimLA
- Formation: 1980
- Type: Non-profit
- Purpose: Promoting Library Development
- Headquarters: Harare, Zimbabwe
- Region served: Africa
- Official language: English, Ndebele, Shona
- President: Mrs Lindiwe Mpindiwa
- President-Elect: Mr Edwin T Madziwo
- Website: www.zimla.org.zw

The Zimbabwe Library Association (ZimLA) is an association that represents library, records, archives and information professionals in Zimbabwe. Membership for those who wish to join the association is voluntary.

== Administration ==
The Zimbabwe Library Association was renamed from the Rhodesia Library Association in 1980, when Zimbabwe declared independence. It is run by a National Executive Council (NEC) whose members are elected for two-year terms. There are five branches covering all ten provinces. Branches are supported by Special Interest Groups. The business of ZimLA is guided by a Constitution and Rules of the Association.

== National Executive Council ==
Zimbabwe Library Association has National Executive Committee members, of which three (3) are the Advisory Council, five (5) are elected branch Chairpersons of our five (5) branches and six (6) elected members are the Management Committee namely:

- President
- President- Elect
- General Secretary
- National Treasurer
- National Editor
- Advocacy Officer

== Former Presidents ==
1. McDonald Nhakura: 2024 - 2025 Mashonaland Branch
2. Jerry Mathema: 2021-2023, Matabeleland Branch
3. Shadeck Ndinde: 2018-2021, Masvingo Branch
4. Lantern Rangarirai Fusire (Deceased):, 2013- 2018 Matabeleland Branch
5. TG Bhowa: 2010-2012, Mashonaland Branch
6. Lawrence Chikwana: - 2003, Masvingo Branch
7. Professor Stan Made:, Mashonaland Branch

== Former Names ==
- Central African Branch of the South African Library Association (1947)
- Library Association of Rhodesia and Nyasaland (1955)
- Central African Library Association (1964)
- Rhodesia Library Association (1967)
- Zimbabwe Library Association (1980)

== Branches ==
The Zimbabwe Library Association has five branches, namely;

- Manicaland
- Mashonaland
- Masvingo
- Matabeleland
- Midlands

== Special Interests Groups ==
The Zimbabwe Library Association (ZimLA) recognises and supports interest groups for librarians who wish to work together. These are:

- School Libraries Section
- Public Libraries Section
- Academic Libraries
- Special Libraries
- National Library and Documentation Services
- Student Representative ( One from the University and the other from Polytechnics)
- Publishers
- Booksellers
- Zimbabwe International Book Fair Association
- Authors Association

== Consortia ==
There are three library consortia in Zimbabwe, namely, the Public Library Consortium (PLC), College and Research Library Consortium (CARLiC) and the Zimbabwe University Library Consortium (ZULC)

- The Public Library Consortium is made up of public libraries and is yet to be officially launched. The consortium will provide a platform for public libraries to interact and share resources.
- The College and Research Library Consortium (CARLiC) was formed at a workshop for librarians held at the Mont Clair Hotel and Casino at Juliasdale, Nyanga, Zimbabwe in 1999. The members include academic libraries like Polytechnics, Teachers Colleges, and libraries of the Ministry of Higher and Tertiary Education, Science and Technology Development. The goal of the consortium is to promote library cooperation and resource sharing among member institutions.
- The Zimbabwe University Libraries Consortium (ZULC) was established in 2001 with an initial membership of six university libraries. It was formed to provide leadership in access to knowledge and to promote information resource sharing and networking in support of human capital development. The consortium is keen to expand membership beyond the traditional university and college members to include NGOs, research institutions and government departments. It is working on a recruitment strategy to grow over the coming years.

== Library Trusts ==
The Library association works with trusts towards the establishment and or development of libraries. The following is a list of trust(s) that work with the association:

=== The Zimbabwe Rural Schools Library Trust (ZRSLT) ===
The Zimbabwe Rural Schools Library Trust (ZRSLT) made a first with the musical album, "Libraries without boundaries", that was voted into the world library marketing and promotion's top ten projects in the IFLA Press Reader International Marketing Awards for 2019 competition.

== Partners and Friends of Libraries ==
ZimLA works with individuals, private businesses, organisation and Friends of Libraries to support the creation or development of libraries. The Swedish Library Association was a cooperative partner to ZimLA. ZimLA is also a partner of the #SheSaid Zimbabwe Mashonaland and Matabeleland 2021 Campaign.

ZimLA is an active member of the Standing Conference of Eastern, Central and Southern African Library and Information Associations (SCECSAL), and has hosted the conference several times.

== Programmes, activities and events ==
=== Preconference ===
The International Association of School Librarians (IASL) Africa Sub-Saharan Region hosts a joint Pre-Conference with the Zimbabwe Library Association every year prior to the Zimbabwe Library Association's Annual Conference and General Meeting. The first edition was launched in 2009. Information professionals/school librarians, educators/researchers, principals, teachers in charge of libraries, school development chairpersons and teachers' college librarians are invited to participate in the pre-conference on school librarianship.

=== Annual Conference ===
ZimLA holds an annual International Conference under a theme set for that year. This conference brings together scholars information professionals from different library and records disciplines to avail opportunities brought by the emergence of new technologies and the subsequent rapid developments obtaining in the dynamic 21st century library and information service environment. The Conference provides a platform for the establishment of technological transformation in the information field among national and international researchers and experts, as well as introduction of national and international best practices in these fields. The conference is hosted by one Branch on a rotation basis.

=== Branch Workshops ===
Workshops are hosted by the association's branches and are usually run under a theme for that activity. The workshops may also be sponsored or run with a partner organization.

=== Zimbabwe International Book Fair librarians Workshop ===
The Zimbabwe International Book Fair Association (ZIBFA) is a non-profit making association of professionals from the literary community within and outside Zimbabwe. ZimLA holds a seminar for librarians at the ZIBF which has been regarded as Africa's premier book and publishing trade fair.

== Projects ==
The association is invested in the establishment of a number of projects that include the following:

=== National Library Policy (NPL) of Zimbabwe ===
The Zimbabwe Library Association (ZimLA) held an Advocacy and National Information Policy Formulation (NIP) Workshop at Cresta Lodge, Harare from 5 – 6 May 2016. The workshop was designed to build capacity for Librarians to enable them to effectively advocate for Access to Information for All. It was also meant to equip Librarians with skills to design, develop, implement, monitor and review a National Information Policy (NIP), either as a standalone policy or as a section in the National Information and Communication Technology (ICT) Policy that is currently in its draft form.

== Publications ==
=== ZimLA Newsletter ===
ZimLA published the ZimLA Newsletter with support from IFLA from 2001 to 2003.

=== Zimbabwe Librarian ===
The official journal the Zimbabwe Librarian used to be known as the Rhodesian Librarian from 1969 to 1979. The ISSN number for ZimLA librarian is 1015–6828 according to issn.org.

=== ZimLA Affiliations ===
ZimLA is a member of the African Library and Information Associations and Institutions (AfLIA). The association is also a member of the International Federation of Library Associations and Institutions (IFLA) and the Standing Conference of Eastern, Central and Southern African Library and Information Associations (SCECSAL). Membership is dependent on being up-to-date in terms of subscriptions charged by these organisations.

== See also ==
- List of library associations
- List of libraries in Zimbabwe

== External links to ZimLA ==
- ZimLA on Zimbabwe reads
