= GZU =

GZU may refer to:

- Great Zimbabwe University
- Guizhou University
