= Whitlaw Tanyanyiwa Mugwiji =

Zimbabwean political activist

Whitlaw Tanyanyiwa Mugwiji (born 17 October 1980) is a Zimbabwean political activist currently exiled in Belgium.

== Education ==
Whitlaw is a former student leader at Great Zimbabwe University. In his first year at Great Zimbabwe University he was elected and became a Faculty of Commerce Board Member. He lobbied the student's grievances on the issue of the quality of the Degrees offered which students felt where inferior compared to the degrees offered by other State Universities in the rest of the country.

=== Student council ===
By the end of the first year he was elected to become the Legal and Academic Affairs Committee member on the Student Representative Council. During this period he was first arrested by the police for addressing students at the Masvingo Polytechnic Campus encouraging students to join in the stay away called by ZCTU. He was beaten by the Criminal Investigations Department (CID) and questioned by officers from the President's office the Central Intelligence Organisation (CIO). The interrogation by the CIO was described as a 'chilling experience'.

== Disciplinary committee ==
In February 2007, Mugwiji together with Edison Hlatshawayo, Everson Zhou, Nicholas Govo and George Makamure they were hauled before a disciplinary committee hearing for leading demonstrations against the decision by University administration to nullify election results because pro-admin students had lost the election. That month he was arrested in Masvingo for distributing MDC fliers with other university student activists.

On 2 April 2007, Mugwiji together with Edison Hlatshwayo and 21 others appeared before a disciplinary committee hearing, in the case of petitioning the Resident Minister to make education affordable for all at his offices in the city.

In April, Mugwiji and Hlatshwayo were arrested again for leading protests over the closure of catering services at the Great Zimbabwe University. They were barred from entering the university campuses. On the 17th of the same month they were both suspended from University.

On 18 June 2007, Whitlaw together with Edson were brutally assaulted by campus security officers and suspected Central intelligence officers as they sat for their end of semester examinations. Whitlaw was badly injured and hospitalized at Masvingo General hospital later transferred to Harare for better treatment. Beginning of the following month they took the college to court through their lawyer Hwacha in a bid to challenge the decision to bar them from writing their examinations. The court ruled that the college must allow the two students to sit for their examinations without interference and gave the college up to the 9th of August to comply with the order. Unfortunately for the students Robert Mugabe, the Chancellor to most Universities, gave direct instructions to the Vice Chancellors to ignore court orders. In Harare, High Court Judge Ben Hlatshwayo ordered the University of Zimbabwe to reverse the eviction of over 4000 students from their halls of residence. But Vice Chancellor Levi Nyagura defied the order, telling one suspended student that Mugabe had told him the judge who made the decision should be prepared to accommodate the students at his house.

In September 2007, when the government wanted to introduce a cadetship programme where students would receive funding for their education but would be compelled to work for the state for a certain period. Whitlaw Mugwiji and his executive organised students to protest against these measures and he was arrested together with his Secretary General Edison Hlatshwayo, Ogylive Makova, Courage Ngwarai and Thomas Chanakira. Everyone else was released except Whitlaw Mugwiji and Courage Ngwarai who were eventually released after spending three nights in the cells.

== Expulsion ==
Mugwiji, together with his Secretary General were finally served with expulsion papers and informed that they could not enroll at any other tertiary institution in Zimbabwe. The worst punishment for any student leader.

After his expulsion he remained a general councillor under Zimbabwe National Students Union playing an active role in leading and organising student protests across the country. This led him to be a target for the regime. During this time he was under severe persecution from the state machinery. He was arrested countless times for frivolous reasons and at times under cooked up charges

In 2008, Mugwiji ran for the Secretary General of the Zimbabwe National Executive Council and was thoroughly defeated by Lovemore Chinoputsa. In the very same year he got a scholarship to go and study International Business Economics at the Maastricht University.

He has been married to Dr Jennifer Sellin since January 2015 and now living Belgium.
