= Rhodesian Cabinet files =

The Rhodesian Cabinet files are a collection of government records removed from Rhodesia and deposited by former prime minister Ian Smith at Rhodes University in South Africa. The documents include Cabinet minutes, security reports and other state papers. Most cover the period from 1964 to 1978, although some date to 1927. The return of the files to Zimbabwe happened in 2012 following negotiations between the Zimbabwean and South African governments. A formal reception of the records took place at State House in Harare on 30 May 2018.

== History and contents ==
The collection contains records of government decision-making during the period of white-minority rule in Rhodesia. In 2018, Zimbabwean officials described the documents deposited at Rhodes University as state records, despite having been deposited as Smith's personal documents. Historian Joanna Warson identifies a collection of Rhodesian Cabinet documents taken out of the country during the Lancaster House negotiations in 1979 and deposited at Rhodes University's Cory Library. She distinguishes these documents from a separate collection of Smith's personal papers deposited by his daughter in April 2010.

== Repatriation ==
Rhodes University publicly acknowledged holding the papers in 1995. According to archivist Livingstone Muchefa, restrictions on access remained until 2009, when the university’s vice-chancellor opened the collection to scrutiny. Zimbabwean scholars based in South Africa, working alongside Zimbabwe’s archival community, questioned whether the collection consisted of Smith’s private papers or government records. In 2010, President Robert Mugabe commissioned historian Enocent Msindo to investigate the documents. Msindo concluded that the collection was predominantly governmental. His findings supported Zimbabwe’s claim for its return.

Ivan Murambiwa, director of the National Archives of Zimbabwe, advocated for the collection’s repatriation. In 2011, he pursued the claim through regional and international archival networks, including the Eastern and Southern Africa Regional Branch of the International Council on Archives (ESARBICA). South African national archivist Mandy Gilder facilitated an agreement between Rhodes University and the Zimbabwean government. The agreement provided for the physical return of the files in 2012 while also allowing the university to maintain continued digital access. The Ministry of Home Affairs (Zimbabwe) coordinated the arrangements, with the Ministry of Foreign Affairs (Zimbabwe) handling cross-border procedures and the air force and police assisting with transport and security.

In May 2018, as part of the formal reception of the records, the government spokesperson Anywhere Mutambudzi confirmed that the documents had been returned and announced that they would be formally presented to President Emmerson Mnangagwa. He described the records as relevant to understanding the Rhodesian government's decisions and to historical research.

On 30 May 2018, President Emmerson Mnangagwa formally received 73 boxes of records at State House in Harare. The material included Cabinet minutes, and security reports previously held at Rhodes University. At the ceremony, he described the recovery of the documents as part of Zimbabwe's efforts to reclaim its historical heritage. The records were transferred to the National Archives of Zimbabwe following the 2018 handover ceremony, but remained classified as of 2024.
