= Chitambira =

chitambira may refer to:

- In Shona language (Zimbabwe), receive or dance for
- Family name of a Shona speaking tribe, originally from Masvingo province of Zimbabwe
