= Zvobgo =

Zvobgo is a Zimbabwean surname. Notable people with the surname include:

- Eddison Zvobgo, Zimbabwean politician
- Julia Tukai Zvobgo, Zimbabwean politician
- Rungano Jonas Zvobgo, Vice Chancellor of Great Zimbabwe University in Zimbabwe
