= Rujeko =

Suburb of Masvingo, Zimbabwe

Coordinates: 20°05′04″S 30°50′29″E

Rujeko is a suburb of Masvingo in southeastern Zimbabwe. It is the second-largest high-density suburb, located southeast of Masvingo.

There are two Masvingo-run primary schools in Rujeko, Rujeko and Shakashe primary schools. Rujeko is divided into three sections: Rujeko A, B and C.
