= Rungano Jonas Zvobgo =

Zimbabwean educationist

Professor Rungano Jonas Zvobgo (born 1948) is the Vice Chancellor of Great Zimbabwe University in Zimbabwe. His second term ends in 2022. Prior to this position, Professor Zvobgo had been Principal of Gweru Teacher's College and subsequently the first deputy vice chancellor of Midlands State University. Professor Zvobgo is also a representative of the southern region for the Association of African Universities (AAU).

== Background ==
Professor Zvobgo comes from one of Zimbabwe's most illustrious families. His most famous brother, Dr Eddison Zvobgo, was a founding member of ZANU, and his other brother, Professor Chengetayi Zvobgo, was a renowned historian at the University of Zimbabwe. Both brothers are now late. Their father was a prominent leader in the Dutch Reformed Church in the Masvingo area.

== Career ==
Being a member of a political family meant that the younger Zvobgo, like his older brothers, lived in exile in the 1970s. He first studied in India, and eventually obtained a PhD in Educational Studies from the University of Edinburgh in 1980 presenting the thesis Government and missionary policies on African secondary education in Southern Rhodesia: with special reference to the Anglican and Wesleyan Methodist churches, 1934-1971. He then returned to Zimbabwe after independence and worked at various institutions of higher education. When Gweru Teacher's College where he presided over as Principal was upgraded into a state university he became a member of the founding executive as deputy vice chancellor. Zvobgo is a renowned educationist.

== Publications ==
- Transforming Education: The Zimbabwean Experience (College Press, 1986)
- Colonialism and Education in Zimbabwe (SAPES, 1994)
- The State, Ideology and Education (Mambo Press, 1997)
- The Post-colonial State and Educational Reform (ZPH, 1999)
- Contextualising the Curriculum: The Zimbabwean Experience (College Press, 2007)
