= Masvingo District =

Coordinates: 20°30′S 31°00′E

Masvingo Victoria
- District
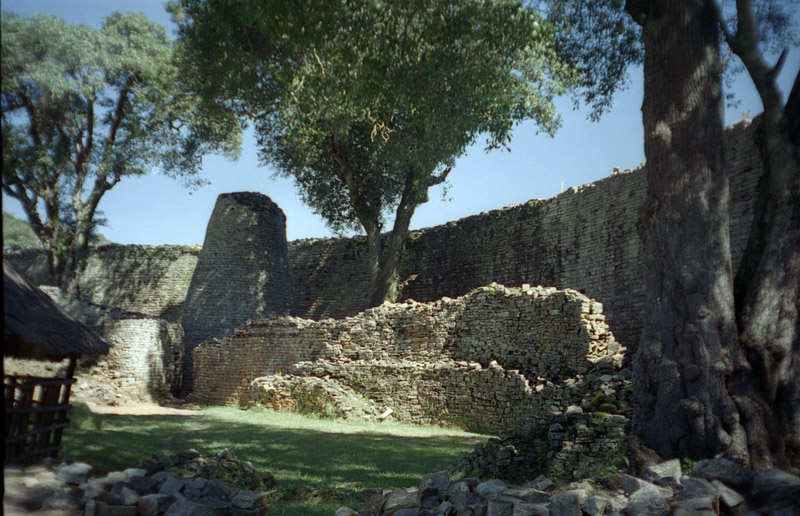
- Great Zimbabwe ruins, found in the district close to the city of Masvingo

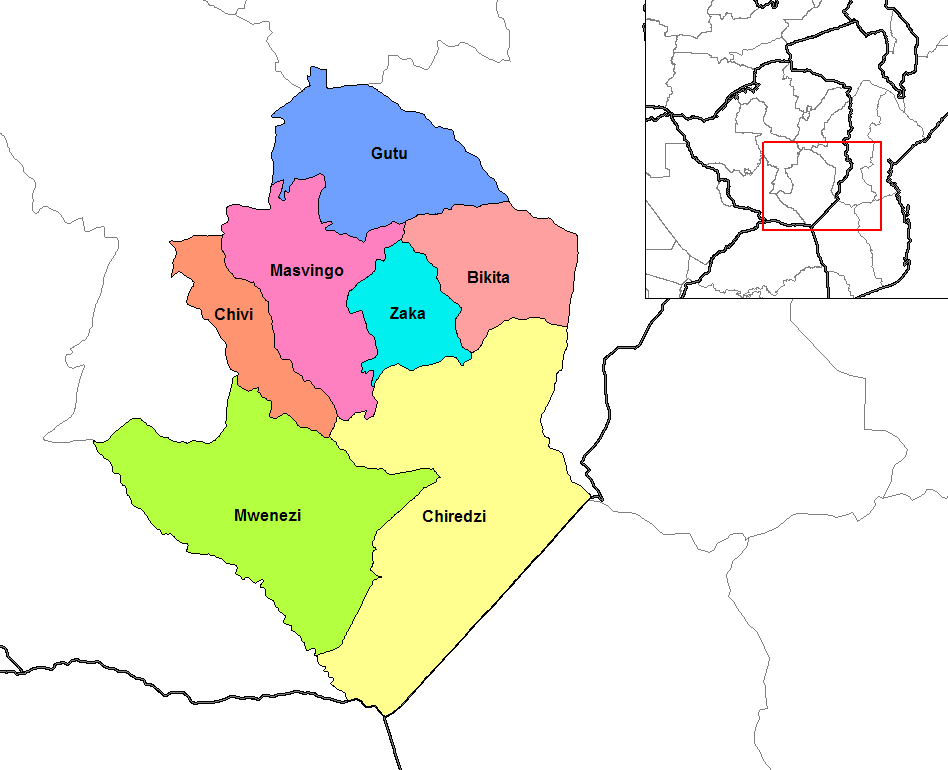
- Districts of Masvingo Province

- Masvingo constituency seats for the 2008 elections, showing the division of MAsvingo (District)
- Country: Zimbabwe
- Province: Masvingo
- District: Masvingo
- Established: late 19th Century

Population (2022 Census)
  - Total: 389,387
- Time zone: UTC+1 (CET)
  - Summer (DST): UTC+1 (CEST)

Masvingo, originally Victoria, encampases metropolitan Masvingo, in Masvingo Province in southern Zimbabwe. The district boasts of the Great Zimbabwe National Monument among its list of tourist attractions. Lake Kyle is also nearby. The people in the district are mostly rural, communal farmers. Mushandike Co-op. is found in the district, in which the villagers use the water from Tokwe River to irrigate their patches of land. Ngomahuru Hospital which is the second largest Psychiatric hospital in the country (after Ingutsheni) is also located.

== Government & Politics ==
=== General Elections 2008 ===
The district has been divided into fives sectors for the general elections of 2008. Candidates from both the MDC and ZANU-PF and independents will compete for the five constituency seats available and winners will go on to represent the district in Zimbabwe's new House of Assembly

Magogo Andrew (Independent), Mhere Edward (Zanu-PF), Chitando Jefferson (MDC Tsvangirai), Mukwazhe Munodei (ZDP), Mutume Mike (UPP) are vying for the Masvingo central seat, while in the north seat there is Mudenge Stan (Zanu-PF), Chidhodha Alois Makamure (UPP), Mutemere Wilstss (MDC Tsvangirai), Gobo Simbarashe (Independent) and to the south there is Chinoda Willington (Independent), Mzembi Walter (Zanu-PF), and Matongo Lovemore (MDC Tsvangirai). In Masvingo urban, there is Mudzume Joburg (MDC Mutambara), Joosbie Omar (Zanu-PF), Tavarera Tinashe (UPP), Matutu Tongai (MDC Tsvangirai) and to there west there is Mbudzi Kudzai (Independent), Shava Jephias (UPP), Mbetu Jabulani (Zanu-PF), and Mharadza Tachiona (MDC Tsvangirai)

== See also ==
- Chiredzi
- Masvingo Province
- Mwenezi District
- Gonarenzou National Park
