= Mucheke River =

River in Zimbabwe

Coordinates: 20°04′38″S 30°50′41″E

The Mucheke River is a river that flows through Masvingo town, Zimbabwe. It originates from the western part of the Masvingo town and merges with the Mushagashe River near Eastvale. Mucheke bridge connects the Harare-Beitbridge road with the Mutare-Beitbridge road.
