= Bruce Makovah =

Zimbabwean cricketer (born 1969)

Personal information
- Full name: Bruce Makovah
- Born: 3 November 1969 (age 57); Fort Victoria, Victoria Province, Rhodesia
- Batting: Right-handed
- Bowling: Right-arm medium

Domestic team information
- Years: Team
- 1994/95: Mashonaland Under-24s

Career statistics
| Competition | First-class |
|---|---|
| Matches | 2 |
| Runs scored | 7 |
| Batting average | 2.33 |
| 100s/50s | –/– |
| Top score | 7 |
| Balls bowled | 324 |
| Wickets | 3 |
| Bowling average | 61.33 |
| 5 wickets in innings | – |
| 10 wickets in match | – |
| Best bowling | 2/39 |
| Catches/stumpings | –/– |
- Source: Cricinfo, 22 September 2012

Bruce Makovah (born 3 November 1969) is a former Zimbabwean cricketer. He was a right-handed batsman and a right-arm medium-pace bowler who played for Mashonaland Under-24s. He was born in Fort Victoria (now Masvingo).

Makovah made two appearances for the team in the Logan Cup competition of 1994/95, including one in the final of the competition. Makovah scored a duck in his debut innings, and bowled economically in the match, taking two wickets.

Makovah's second and final appearance came in the final of the competition against Mashonaland. The game saw two Mashonaland batsmen score heavily, Gary Martin and Ali Shah scoring first-class bests.

Makovah was a tailend batsman.
