= Kyle College =

Coordinates: 20.0511°S 30.8463°E

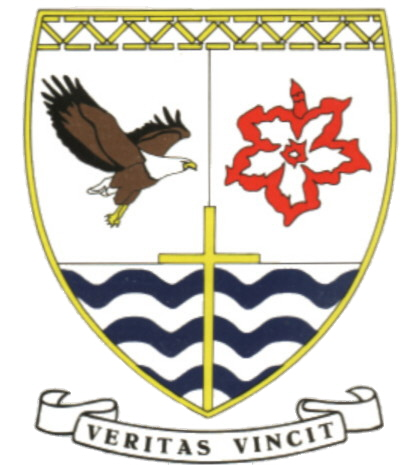
- Kyle College Logo

Location
- Capota Road; Masvingo; Zimbabwe

Information
- Type: Independent, boarding and day school
- Motto: Veritas Vincit (Latin: Truth Conquers)
- Founded: 1996
- Headmaster: Percy K. Sachinda
- Gender: Co-educational
- Enrollment: 420 (2022)
- Tuition: US$1,100.00 (day); US$2,800.00 (boarding); (Note: Termly fees, the year has 3 terms.)
- Feeder schools: Kyle Preparatory School
- Affiliations: ATS; CHISZ
- Website: kylecollege.com

Kyle College is an independent, co-educational, boarding and day school situated about 6 km from the centre of Masvingo on Capota Road on the Eastern side of the Shagashe river. It has views of the Ruvure, Nyuni and Nyanda hills to the South, and the Mangwandi granite dome in the North West.

Kyle College is a member of the Association of Trust Schools (ATS) and the Headmaster is a member of the Conference of Heads of Independent Schools in Zimbabwe (CHISZ).

The School is known for its Rugby. The First XV is known as the VIKINGS. They have been co-opted into the Super 8 Rugby Schools.

== Notable alumni ==
- Tafadzwa Chitokwindo (Zimbabwe Sevens Rugby Player 2010-Current )

== See also ==
- List of schools in Zimbabwe
- List of boarding schools
