= Victoria High School (Zimbabwe) =

Government high school in Masvingo, Zimbabwe

Coordinates: 20.0574°S 30.8296°E

Victoria High School is a government high school in the Rhodene suburb of the town of Masvingo, Zimbabwe. It is a former group - A school which during the colonial era were schools meant for white students equipped with state of the art equipment and facilities. It is a boarding school. The school is led by a headmaster appointed by the Ministry of Education.

== History ==
The school was opened in 1959 when it was originally named Fort Victoria High School, after the then name of the town on the outskirts of which it was situated. The town's name was originally just Victoria (after Queen Victoria), but this was later changed to Fort Victoria. The second name Fort Victoria was eventually changed to the third name Nyanda in 1982, for about six months, after which it was changed again from Nyanda to Masvingo (also in 1982).

The first headmaster was Les Sharp. Later headmasters (& acting headmasters) included Mr Jardine, Mr Maytham, Mr Wotherspoon, Mr Buitendag and Mr Ngwenya. Mr Ngwenya became the first Bantu African headmaster in 1984.

For its first twenty years the school's students were primarily European Rhodesians, with no Africans admitted. This changed in about 1979 in the era of the transition from Rhodesia to Zimbabwe-Rhodesia and thence to Zimbabwe.

== Hostels ==
As a boarding school, it is made up of hostels that house students from Form 1 through to 6. These hotels are supervised by a superintendent who is often a staff member as well as hostel matrons. The hostels are:

- Les Sharp hostel - usually hosts first year or form ones students. This is a mixed hostel for both girls and boys.
- Kyle and Temple hostels - usually accommodate girls from form two through to six.
- Fort and Tower hostels - that accommodate boys from form two through to six.

== Notable alumni ==
- Tafadzwa Chitokwindo, rugby player
- Tendai Chisoro, Zimbabwe cricket player
- Nelson Chamisa, Politician
- Rudorwashe Shumba, Zimbabwe Council of Churches
- Donald Mangenje, Zimbabwe Rugby player
