= National Library of Zimbabwe =

- 20°09′44″S 28°35′31″E
- Location: Zimbabwe

The National Library of Zimbabwe also known National Free Library of Zimbabwe is located in Bulawayo, the second biggest city in Zimbabwe. It was established under the National Library and Documentation Service (NLDS) Act Chapter 25:10 act of 1985 which was passed by the Zimbabwean Government in 1985.

== Historical background to the establishment of NLDS ==
The evolution of library services in Rhodesia before Zimbabwe's independence can be categorized into four distinct phases: Pioneer Stage (1895–1927); Carnegie Stage (1928–1947); Valley Report Stage and Federation (1948–1963); and Unilateral Declaration of Independence (UDI) Stage (1964–1980).

== Pioneering stage (1895–1927) ==
The period 1895–1927 marked the inception of library systems in English-speaking Central Africa. Unique historical and educational influences shaped the development of public libraries in this region. A diminutive, literate white populace in proximity to administrative centers led the establishment of widespread libraries in a thinly populated territory. The initial public libraries emerged from the desire of a limited settler population to keep in touch with civilization in their homeland.

Public libraries were initiated by individuals, often starting as subscription-based services. In Southern Rhodesia, the Bulawayo Public Library was the first public subscription library, opening in 1896. This was succeeded by the Gwelo Public Library (now Gweru Memorial Library) in 1897. The Queen Victoria Memorial Library, (now Harare City Library), was established in 1902 in memory of Queen Victoria Similarly, the Turner Memorial Library in Umtali (now Mutare) was founded in 1902 in honor of Major Scott Turner. Other subscription libraries followed in Enkledoorm (now Chivhu) in 1903, Gatooma (now Kadoma) in 1917, and Umvuma (now Mvuma) in 1926.

Consequently, Southern Rhodesia developed a subscription-based public library system without governmental support. These libraries were isolated collections serving limited areas and only those who could afford to use them.

== Carnegie stage (1928–1947) ==
In 1928, the Carnegie Corporation of New York tasked Messrs. M. J. Ferguson and S.A. Pitt with conducting a thorough investigation into the provision of library services across South Africa, Rhodesia, and Kenya. Within Southern Rhodesia, which at that time was inhabited by approximately 45,000 Whites, 100,000 Africans, and 4,000 Coloured individuals, Pitt observed that libraries had been established and were being sustained primarily as subscription-based institutions, receiving minimal financial assistance from the government and the municipalities in which they were located. This observation consequently highlighted the reality that member subscriptions constituted the predominant source of funding for library expenditures. Through the initiatives of Mr. Dugald Niven, the librarian at the Bulawayo Public Library, a conference was convened on 20 October 1928, in Salisbury to deliberate on the library needs of Southern Rhodesia. During this conference, Mr. Niven received a mandate to prepare and present a proposal to a fully representative committee that was established during the meeting. The proposal that Mr. Niven submitted to the committee envisioned the incremental establishment of a National Library Service, which would include:

- A Central Library, serving as a national lending library for adults, a circulation library for educational institutions, and a Central Reference Library.
- The Public Libraries of the colony collaborating with the Central Library to provide educational resources to the populace in any region of the colony where such services were deemed necessary.
- All educational institutions throughout the colony functioning as conduits of the service and partnering with the central library as distribution hubs.
- Specialized libraries, including that of the Southern Rhodesia Teachers Association and other organizations willing to consolidate their collections and foster cooperation with the central library.

The principal library for Southern Rhodesia was proposed to be situated in Salisbury, while both the Bulawayo Public Library and the Queen Victoria Memorial Library would serve as regional library centers within their respective jurisdictions. Mr. Niven advocated for the libraries to operate on a complimentary basis, receiving support from governmental taxes or local authorities, with the Carnegie Corporation providing an initial grant along with a series of diminishing grants, complemented by a gradual increase in local funding.

In 1929, the Carnegie Corporation proposed an initial grant of £12,500, contingent upon the Government of Southern Rhodesia's agreement to uphold and support a library service in accordance with Mr. Niven's recommendations; however, the government was reluctant to implement these recommendations. Nonetheless, in 1939, following extensive revisions of the proposal, a launching grant was allocated to the Bulawayo Public Library, conditional upon the Government's contribution to the operational costs of maintaining a national free lending service. Ultimately, this service was instituted in 1943, manifesting as the National Free Library Service headquartered in Bulawayo.

== Valley report stage and federation (1948–1963) ==
A team of competent librarians came to Southern Rhodesia in 1948. This led to the establishment of the Southern African Library Association's Central African Branch, the colony's first professional organization. In addition to the older colony, the association started an effort to think about the future development of library facilities in the three English-speaking Central African territories that appeared to have many resources and needs in common. All known libraries in the three territories received a thorough questionnaire, and based on the results, the Carnegie Corporation of New York was requested to provide funding so that professional librarians could create plans for future library development.

At the instigation of the Central African Branch of the Southern African Library Association, financed by the Carnegie Corporation, Mr. Douglas H. Varley, who served as the librarian at the South African Library in Cape Town, was invited to create a report on the library services present in the regions of Rhodesia and Nyasaland in 1950. This initiative appeared to serve as a precursor to the impending federation of libraries coinciding with the establishment of the Federation of Rhodesia and Nyasaland, which was officially inaugurated in 1953.

The Varley Report elucidated that the overarching landscape of library services in Central Africa was characterized by disparate and uncoordinated initiatives. Although public subscription libraries had been set up in the leading urban centers during the foundational years, and the pioneering ethos was preserved in multiple communities, the notion of governmental responsibility for library services had not been comprehensively embraced. The most substantial provision made was the allocation of minimal grants-in-aid on a pound-for-pound matching basis.

Subsequently, the Varley Report articulated recommendations concerning the optimal strategies for enhancing library services. The primary goal delineated was the establishment of a National Library Service encompassing the three territories, meticulously planned at all operational tiers.

The key public libraries were expected to transform from their initial subscription framework into community focal points for free public library services, reinforced by the creation of union catalogues, bibliographic and documentation centers, the unification of a national reference collection, and the fostering of inter-library partnerships as demonstrated by the National Free Library Service situated in Bulawayo, which aimed to improve accessibility for committed readers. To serve as the operative body, a national council was to be constituted at the governmental echelon. Furthermore, the Varley Report expressed a robust commitment to the enhancement of school libraries. Shortly after the completion of the Varley Report in 1951, the amalgamation of the three Central African territories transpired, culminating in the formation of the Federation of Rhodesia and Nyasaland in 1953.

== Federation breakup and UDI 1964–1980 ==
In relation to public libraries, the federation had made minimal contributions. Although there was a recommendation to transfer the Southern Rhodesia National Free Library to Federal oversight, its status remained unchanged, and the creation of the Northern Rhodesia Library Services in 1962, further diminished the federation's relevance in terms of library services. This seems to accurately encapsulate the limited support the federation provided to the library movement. Aside from the establishment of the Northern Rhodesia Library Service, which appeared to set the stage for real advancement, there was a prevalent indifference toward the condition of public libraries. Among the three territories of the federation, Southern Rhodesia faced a unique challenge in adapting to the proposed framework for the federation as a whole. The subscription library tradition, which was being phased out in the northern territories, remained robust in Southern Rhodesia, suggesting that a truly coordinated public library system serving the entire population was unlikely to develop.

In 1962, the Rhodesia Library Association took another step forward by advocating for proposals aimed at reforming and developing the library system, with responsibilities intended to be shared between the government and local authorities.

It envisioned the government taking full responsibility for central services, including the National Free Library Service, as it had in the past, while also catering to the very small population centers. It suggested that local authorities should retain the primary responsibility for services in urban areas and larger towns. Public library provision would be recognized as a shared responsibility between the government and local authorities, falling between these two extremes. The association also recommended that immediate steps be taken to enhance library services for Africans across all regions by transferring the Book Box libraries from the Southern Rhodesia Information Service to the National Free Library. However, when these proposals were presented to the Local Government Association in 1964, its reaction was unfavorable, stating that there was no connection between local government and libraries.

In English-speaking Central Africa, the National Free Library, located in Bulawayo, seemed to be the sole provider of common reading materials for all regions. Since 1946, it had been distributing books across the three territories of Southern Rhodesia, Northern Rhodesia, and Nyasaland. However, it possessed certain unique characteristics and functions that were specific to the Southern Rhodesian context from which it emerged. In 1939, a compromise was reached between the Carnegie Corporation and the Southern Rhodesian Government, which stipulated that town libraries would remain subscription-based and that a new service would be created, initially funded by the corporation's grant and maintained by the National Free Library Services. This new service was intended to focus on the free loan of essential academic and technical books for serious study, leaving the responsibility for general and light reading materials to the town libraries. The scheme, however, could not be implemented during the Second World War. It eventually commenced operations in 1945 in the subbasement of the Bulawayo Public Library, remaining there until it relocated to the modern "Dugald Niven Library" building in 1962.

The National Free Library Service, however, did not resemble a network of branches spanning the entire area. It functioned as a singular library. For several reasons, it was unable to operate as a central library that maintained a central collection of books accessible through all local libraries. Firstly, the town libraries continued to operate autonomously. Secondly, due to social factors, Africans in Southern Rhodesia were not permitted to use these town libraries as borrowers. Thirdly, the long-standing subscription system throughout British Central Africa complicated the efforts of the National Free Library Service. This system inevitably imposed a commercial value on library stocks and led to a scarcity of standard books, which are essential for a public library's primary role of making literature available to local residents.

Between 1970 and 1983 a number of reports were sponsored by the Government (Greenfield 1970), the Zimbabwe Library Association and the British Council (Allison 1981), the Zimbabwe Library Association and the Swedish Library Mission (Lalloo 1982) and the Ministry of Education and the British Council (Dudley 1983), on various aspects of the need for a National Library and Documentation Service of which a training center would be one of the major Divisions.

== Independence ==
Zimbabwe achieved its independence in 1980. Following this, the Zimbabwe Libraries Association made another attempt to convey its perspectives to the new government regarding the state of library services in the country. The association was keen to see a fresh approach to the provision of libraries for all citizens across the nation.

At the request of the Zimbabwe Library Association, the Government of Zimbabwe sought the assistance of the British Council to engage Mr. W.G. Alison, the director of Libraries for the City of Glasgow, Scotland, to visit Zimbabwe in order to:

- Evaluate the current condition of library services in Zimbabwe as well as their future financing and development, taking into account the country's cultural, social, economic, and technical requirements, its individual citizens, and particularly the public libraries.
- Examine previous studies of a similar kind and the recommendations that arose from them;
- Gather evidence regarding desired standards for library provision and services and on any other matters he may find pertinent.
- Provide recommendations on these issues as he considers appropriate.

Mr. Alison traveled to Zimbabwe from February 14 to March 7, 1981, and later submitted his findings to the British Council, which then presented them to the minister of education and culture. The report's recommendations for a cohesive national library service that includes public, school, and government libraries were accepted in principle by the government. The Alison report facilitated a framework through which libraries could attain accountability to the government, while concurrently allowing the government to maintain accountability to the libraries for the first time. The proposed financial allocation was significantly greater than the current library budgets, and the report advocated for the initiation of a graduate-level library training program within Zimbabwe.

Following Alison's visit, an additional feasibility study was conducted with both local and international experts. This study assessed the current state of library services and their potential development and funding, considering the cultural, social, economic, and technical needs of the nation.

The comprehensive examination of the contents of the Alison report by the Zimbabwe Librarian required nearly a year due to government-imposed restrictions, and by the time librarians were permitted to engage in discourse regarding the recommendations, the Zimbabwe government had already implemented actions. The establishment of the National Library and Documentation Service occurred in October 1981. Although it lacked the authority to formulate or enforce regulations, it signified the inaugural government board convening libraries from across the nation.

== National library and documentation services ==
On 28 October 1981, the interim National Library and Documentation Council was established in Harare to lead the formation of National Library and Documentation Services.

The Alison Report recommended creating a statutory national library service to coordinate the country's library resources, focusing on public, school, and government libraries. The Council evaluated the benefits of making the National Library and Documentation Services a statutory body or a public service department. They found both options equally advantageous but highlighted the necessity for strong communication between key officials. The decision on the NLDS's status was deemed a matter for the Government. The NLDS Bill was drafted, approved by the House of Assembly and Senate, and received Presidential Assent and passed as an Act in January 1985.

== Purpose of the national free library of Zimbabwe ==
The main purpose of the library is to provide book lending service, inter-library loans and act as a National Public Library in Zimbabwe.

The library used to be managed by 30 librarians but due to lack of support it is now staffed by 5 workers. Similar funding issues prompted the creation of the Zimbabwe University Libraries Consortium in 2001, to allow academic institutions to collaborate to afford access to digital resources and scientific journals that the National Interlending Servicew could not support.

== See also ==
- National Archives of Zimbabwe
- List of national libraries

== Bibliography ==
- "Zimbabwe", World Report 2010, The Hague: International Federation of Library Associations, OCLC 225182140, archived from the original on 2019-06-29, "Freedom of access to information". (Includes information about the national library)
