= National Archives of Zimbabwe =

Governmental historical archive in Zimbabwe

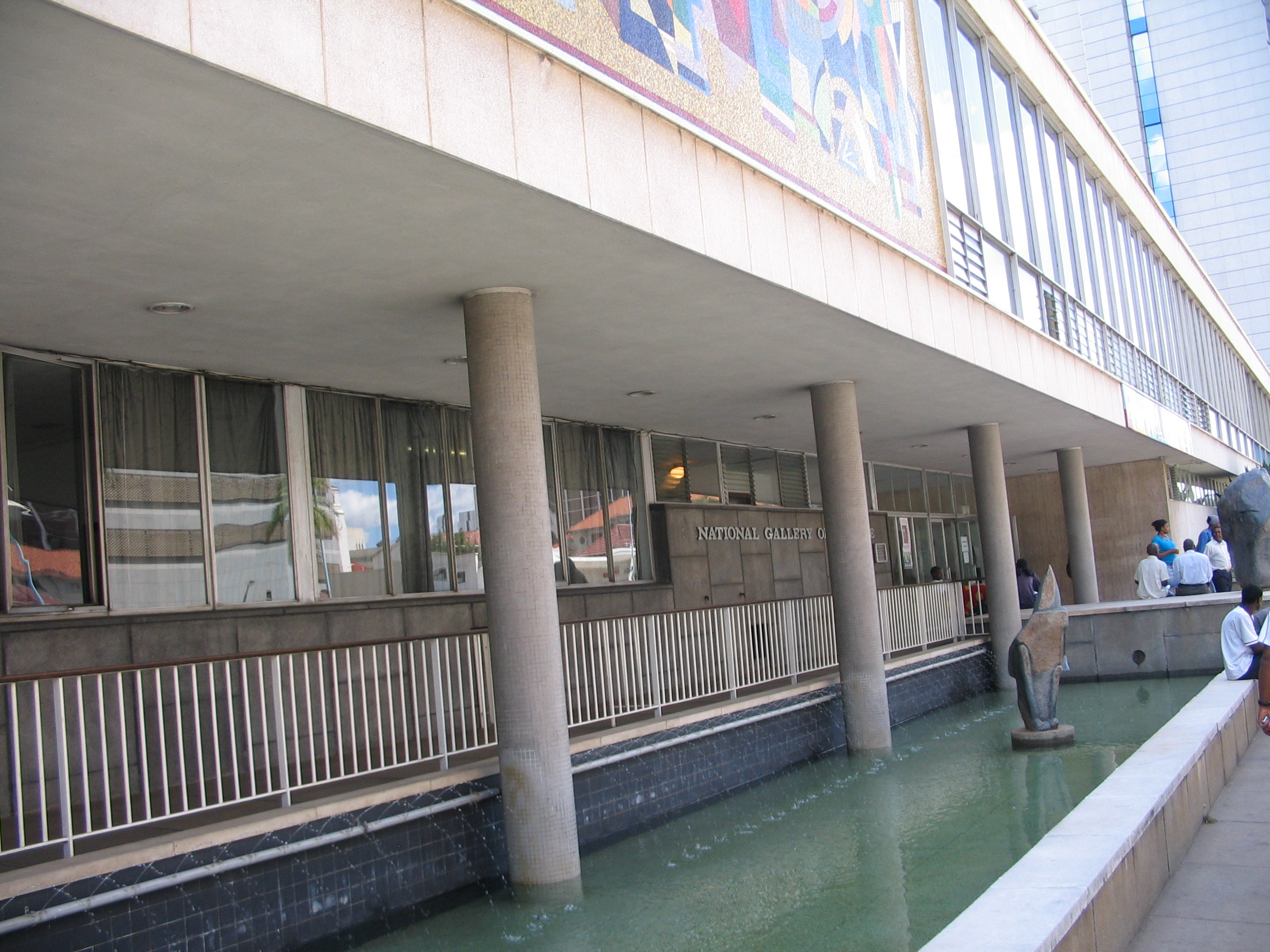
- The entrance to the National Gallery of Zimbabwe
- Established: 1935
- Location: Harare, Zimbabwe
- Type: National archives
- Website: www.archives.gov.zw

The National Archives of Zimbabwe are the national archives of Zimbabwe. They are located in Harare.

The National Archives were established by an Act of Parliament in 1935, now known as the National Archives Act 1986. The Archives are the storehouse of the nation's documented history. They include the archives of the former Southern Rhodesia, and are formed of a network of five regional archives divided into eight provinces. From 1953-1963, they were the central repository of the National Archives of Rhodesia and Nyasaland.

Its Audiovisual Unit was established in 1988. Its collect encompasses 15,000 audiovisual materials about Zimbabwe. Its Oral History Programme collects and preserves oral interviews of people whose contribution to Zimbabwean history has been considerable but under-documented.

The first Director at National Archives of Zimbabwe at independence was Angeline Kamba. Angeline Kamba is the only female Director to head this Department up to 2021. The latest Director was Ivan Munhamu Murambiwa who passed on 2021. In 2018 National Archives of Zimbabwe started Community Archives Project. The following were done Arcturus High School, Harare Girls High School, Mbungo Zion Christian Centre, Bikita, Zvishavane and currently Kariba.

== Web accessibility ==
In September 2025, the website of the National Archives of Zimbabwe was tested for conformance with Web Content Accessibility Guidelines (WCAG). The website of National Archives of Zimbabwe obtained a score of 7.7 decimal out of 10. The test was taken on September 2025 as part of a research on web accessibility of national libraries around the world. Given a threshold of 8-out-of-10 for a website to be considered accessible, it can be said that as of September 2025, the website for the National Archives of Zimbabwe is not accessible.

== See also ==
- National Library of Zimbabwe
- List of national archives
- Central African Archives
- ESARBICA
- Zimbabwe's "Capturing a Fading National Memory project
