= Save Zimbabwe =

Save Zimbabwe is a broad coalition of organizations spearheaded by the Zimbabwe Christian Alliance (CA). Members include the Movement for Democratic Change and other opposition parties, church groups, civil rights groups and trade unions.

The campaign's stated aims are to restore democracy, human rights and legitimate government to Zimbabwe through providing early, free and fair elections under proper international supervision. Its chief spokesman is Ephraim Tapa, former president of the Civil Service Employees Union in Zimbabwe.

== Prayer Rally ==
On 11 March 2007 Zimbabwe police broke up a Save Zimbabwe prayer rally, arresting over 100 people, including the leader of the Movement for Democratic Change, Morgan Tsvangirai. Zimbabwe police claimed that the prayer rally violated a government ban on political protests. In the resulting unrest one opposition activist, Gift Tandare, was shot dead by police.
