= Gokomere High School =

Zimbabwean boarding school

Gokomere High School is a boarding school sixteen km from Masvingo, Zimbabwe.

It was founded in July 1898 as a centre for vocational training and Sunday School. Secondary education started in 1910 under the captainship of the Jesuit Fathers. The brethren missionaries took over in 1940. One of the schools prestigious achievements is the Diocesan Choir title and the Diocesan Sports Title held at Mukaro Mission in 2016. They won the title 4 times.

Motto: “Vincere Caritate/ Conquer with love”

Boarders are the majority of students at Gokomere High School. Students are mainly from the provinces of Zimbabwe and a very small number from SADC countries. The school is at the heart of the Catholic Diocese of Masvingo so all religious meetings are done there.

The school aims to be a source of qualified 'O' Level students to other schools with 'A' Level facilities, and a source of qualified students for universities, vocational and technical colleges. It offers a College Preparatory program via its "A" Levels program.

== Training center ==
The center was established by Bishop Alois Haene, the then ordinary of Gweru Diocese. After Vatican Council 11, the Catholic Council church's thrust on evangelization was focused on developing the local church. Hence, there was great need to promote lay participation in the life of the church. There were very few indigenous priests, religious brothers and sisters in the diocese. Bishop Alois Haene decided to open a training centre which would train lay leaders who were intended to be agents of change from the Catholic Church before Vatican Council 11 to a Post Vatican Council 11 where each local church would have its identity.

Fr. Xavier Ineichen was appointed by Bishop Haene as the first director of Gokomere training centre in 1970.

Gokomere Training Centre is a spiritual and social centre offering the following programmes: • Catechism • Lay leaders training • Executive Leadership Courses • Tailoring • Secretarial courses • Computers

The training center's challenges include: • few students managing to pay the fees due to harsh economic conditions. • maintenance of computers, type-writers and photocopiers • unavailability of transport • self-reliance projects have been affected by drought and input shortages.

Notable Alumni Morgan Tsvangirai former prime minister of Zimbabwe Jacob Mafume MDC Alliance spokesperson
