= Lake Mutirikwe =

Lake Mutirikwi
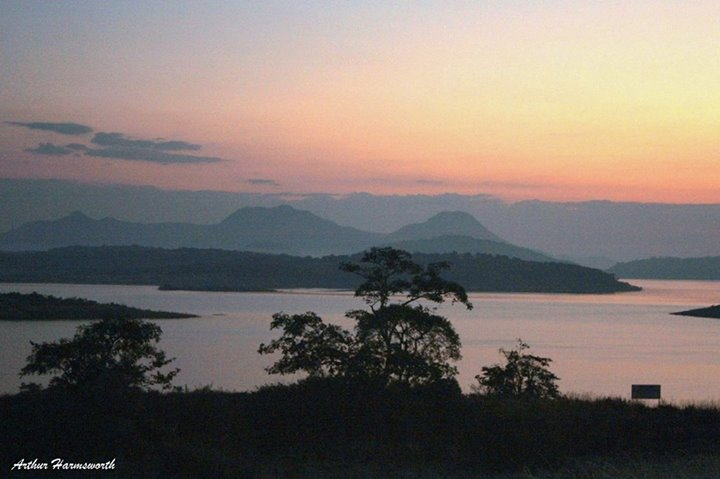
- Lake Mutirikwi

- Location within Zimbabwe
- Official name: Lake Mutirikwi
- Location: Masvingo
- Coordinates: 20°14′56.12″S 31°01′59.74″E
- Construction began: 1958-1960

Dam and spillways
- Impounds: Mutirikwi River
- Height: 63 m (207 ft)
- Length: 309 m (1,014 ft)

Reservoir
- Total capacity: 1,378 million cubic metres
- Catchment area: 3900 km^{2}
- Surface area: 9105 ha
- Double-curvature concrete arch Spillway: Overflow crest with 1m gates Discharge capacity 1740 m³/s

Lake Mutirikwi, originally known as Lake Kyle or Kyle Dam, lies in south eastern Zimbabwe, south east of Masvingo. It is thought to have been named after Kyle Farm which occupied most of the land required for the lake, which in turn was named after the Kyle district in Scotland from which the pioneer of the Lowveld, Tom Murray MacDougall came originally.

The lake covers about 90 km^{2} (35 sq mi) and was created in 1960 with the construction of the Kyle Dam on the Mutirikwi River. The dam was built by Concor to provide water to the farming estates on the lowveld to the southwest, around the town of Triangle, where the main crop has been sugar cane.

Lake Kyle Recreational Park lies on the reservoir's northern shore, while there is a small recreational park on the southern shore. Great Zimbabwe national monument lies close by.

Rivers which feed the lake include the Mbebvi River, Matare River, Pokoteke River, Umpopinyani River, Makurumidze River and Mushagashe River.

In the 1980s, drought drastically lowered the water level in the lake, but during the 1990s it recovered. The level fluctuates widely due to irrigation demands and the seasonal rainfall.
