= Zimbabwe University Libraries Consortium =

Zimbabwean academic library organisation

- Abbreviation: ZULC
- Formation: 2001
- Affiliations: INASP, EIFL
- Website: https://zulc.ac.zw/

The Zimbabwe University Libraries Consortium (ZULC) is a library consortium of academic institutions and non-profit organisations in Zimbabwe. Through collaboration, ZULC provides members and affiliates with access to events, workshops, and digital content they would not be able to afford on their own.

== Background ==
The Zimbabwe University Libraries Consortium was created in 2001. A founding chairman was Jasper Maenzanise, and a founding secretary was Sarlome Mbasera, Librarian at the Catholic University of Zimbabwe. One of the main goals of the consortium is to share resources, such as access to international science journals, and promote cooperation among academic institutions without having to rely on only existing systems like the National Interlending Systems, which would otherwise be overstretched. Without needing to rely on the National Interlending System, ZULC was able to negotiate directly with international publishers and access a larger volume of materials specific to the members' status as academic libraries. Another goal was to support and promote librarianship and library science in Zimbabwe by providing professional structure.

ZULC provides member institutions access to journals like JSTOR.

ZULC frequently collaborates with other library-related organizations in Zimbabwe, including the initiatives at the Zimbabwe Open University.

== Members ==
The member universities include 15 members, as well as additional affiliate members.

=== Full members ===
- Africa University (AU)
- Bindura University (BU)
- Catholic University of Zimbabwe
- Chinhoyi University of Technology (CUT) Library
- Midlands State University (MSU)
- National University of Science and Technology (NUST)
- Solusi University
- University of Zimbabwe
- Zimbabwe Open University (ZOU)

=== Affiliate members ===
- Harare Polytechnic

== See also ==
- Zimbabwe Library Association (ZimLA)
