= Reformed Church University =

Reformed Church University (RCU) was established in 2012 in Masvingo Zimbabwe. Its core values are

- Christianity- upholding Christian principles leading to spiritual growth.
- Equity – fairness and affording equal opportunities to divergent populace.
- Excellence – attaining and surpassing best practices.
- Integrity – upholding ethical and honest conduct in all our dealings.
- Transparency- Openness and accountability in our conduct.

== Campuses ==
As of the latest information available, Reformed Church University (RCU) in Zimbabwe has four campuses and cohort centres:

1. Main Campus - Located in Masvingo.
2. Murray/Theology Campus - Located in Masvingo
3. Highfied Campus - Located in Harare.

Cohort centers

1. Mutare
2. Beitbrigde
3. Chiredzi
4. Hartfield Campus

These campuses offer various programs and services to students.
