= Great Zimbabwe University =

University in Masvingo, Zimbabwe

- Motto: "The University of choice"
- Type: Public
- Established: 1995
- Chancellor: Emmerson Mnangagwa (President)
- Vice-Chancellor: Rungano Jonas Zvobgo
- Location: Masvingo, Zimbabwe; 20.103°S 30.863°E
- Campus: Multi Campus
- Website: gzu.ac.zw

Great Zimbabwe University (GZU) is an institution of higher learning in the city of Masvingo, Zimbabwe. It is currently situated on the Masvingo Teachers’ College campus seven kilometres east of Masvingo CBD. Currently the institution has a number of campuses in and around the city, including some in the high density suburb of Mucheke, most notably the school of tourism and hospitality situated on a hill on what used to be a hotel. The Herbert Chitepo law school and the library are among the campuses in the center of town. There are also newly built campuses to the west in the industrial zone of the city, whose buildings stand out along the Bulawayo highway. There is another campus in the mining town of Mashava 40km west of Masvingo. A larger campus is soon to be built near the Great Zimbabwe National Monument, the namesake of the university.

One of a number of universities the government opened after independence in 1980, Great Zimbabwe University began life as the Masvingo State University (MASU). which was established through the recommendations of the 1995 Chetsanga Report. The report had proposed the devolution of teachers’ and technical colleges into degree-awarding institutions that would eventually become universities in their own right. A university college attached to the University of Zimbabwe was accordingly launched in 1999/2000. Two years later, an Act of Parliament created the autonomous Masvingo State University. The name was changed to Great Zimbabwe University two years later.

The university offers degree and diploma programmes at undergraduate and postgraduate levels in the arts, commerce, education and the sciences. The programmes are designed to be responsive to the needs of the job market in Zimbabwe's ever-changing economy.

== Arts and literature ==
The Department of Visual and Performing Arts in the Simon Muzenda School of Arts, Culture and Heritage Studies on Friday 19 May 2017, premiered a movie, Solo naMutsai. The film, explores university student life; the ups and downs, the love life, dealing with external forces and different social classes and it was written by Charles Munganasa and directed by Sydney Taivavashe. The department also launched a music album, Dangwe, on 7 April 2017.

In 2018, two Great Zimbabwe University lecturers, Munyaradzi Mawere and Tapuwa Rubaya, started a publishing company in Masvingo to promote indigenous stories and encourage the growth of a reading culture. Africa Talent Publishers is reportedly the first such establishment to be founded in the town.

== Politics ==
In 2019, the anti-ZANU–PF Zimbabwe National Students Union (ZINASU) defeated the pro-ZANU–PF Zimbabwe Congress of Students Union (ZICOSU).
