= Masvingo =

City in southeastern Zimbabwe

Masvingo Fort Victoria
- City
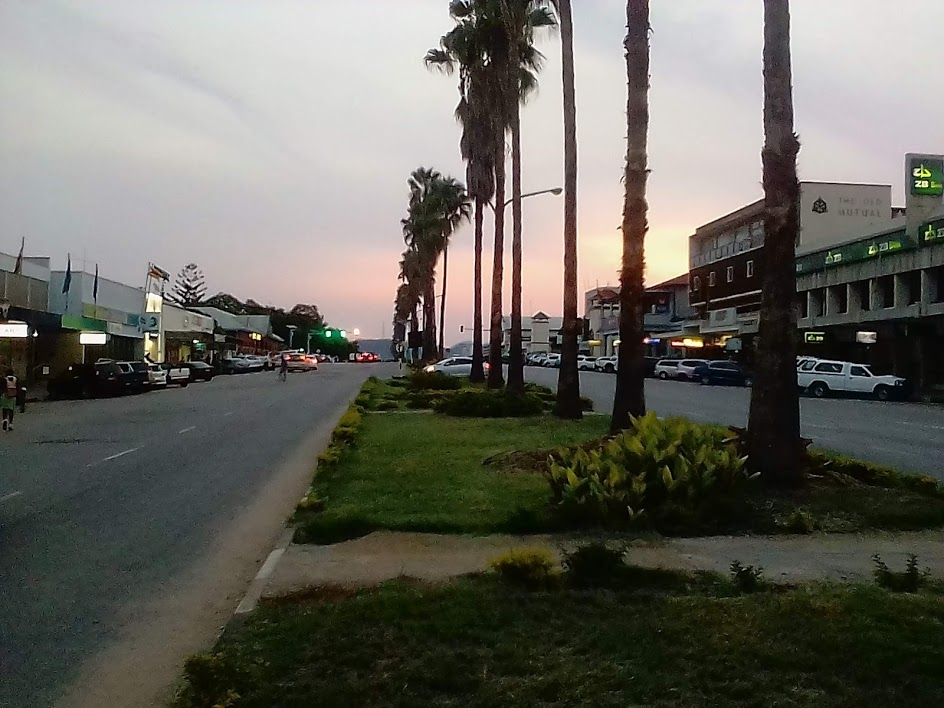

- Coat of arms
- Motto: Our Heritage Our Guide
- Location within Zimbabwe
- Coordinates: 20°03′45″S 30°49′25″E
- City: Zimbabwe
- Province: Masvingo
- District: Masvingo
- Fort Victoria: 1890
- Masvingo: 1982

Government
  - Executive Mayor: Femius Chakabuda
  - Executive Mayor: Collin Maboke

Area
  - Urban: 71.88 km^{2} (27.75 sq mi)
- Elevation: 1,075 m (3,527 ft)

Population (2022 census)
  - Urban: 90,286
  - Urban density: 1,256/km^{2} (3,253/sq mi)
- Time zone: UTC+2 (CAT)
- Area code: 039
- Climate: Cwa
- Website: http://masvingocity.gov.zw/

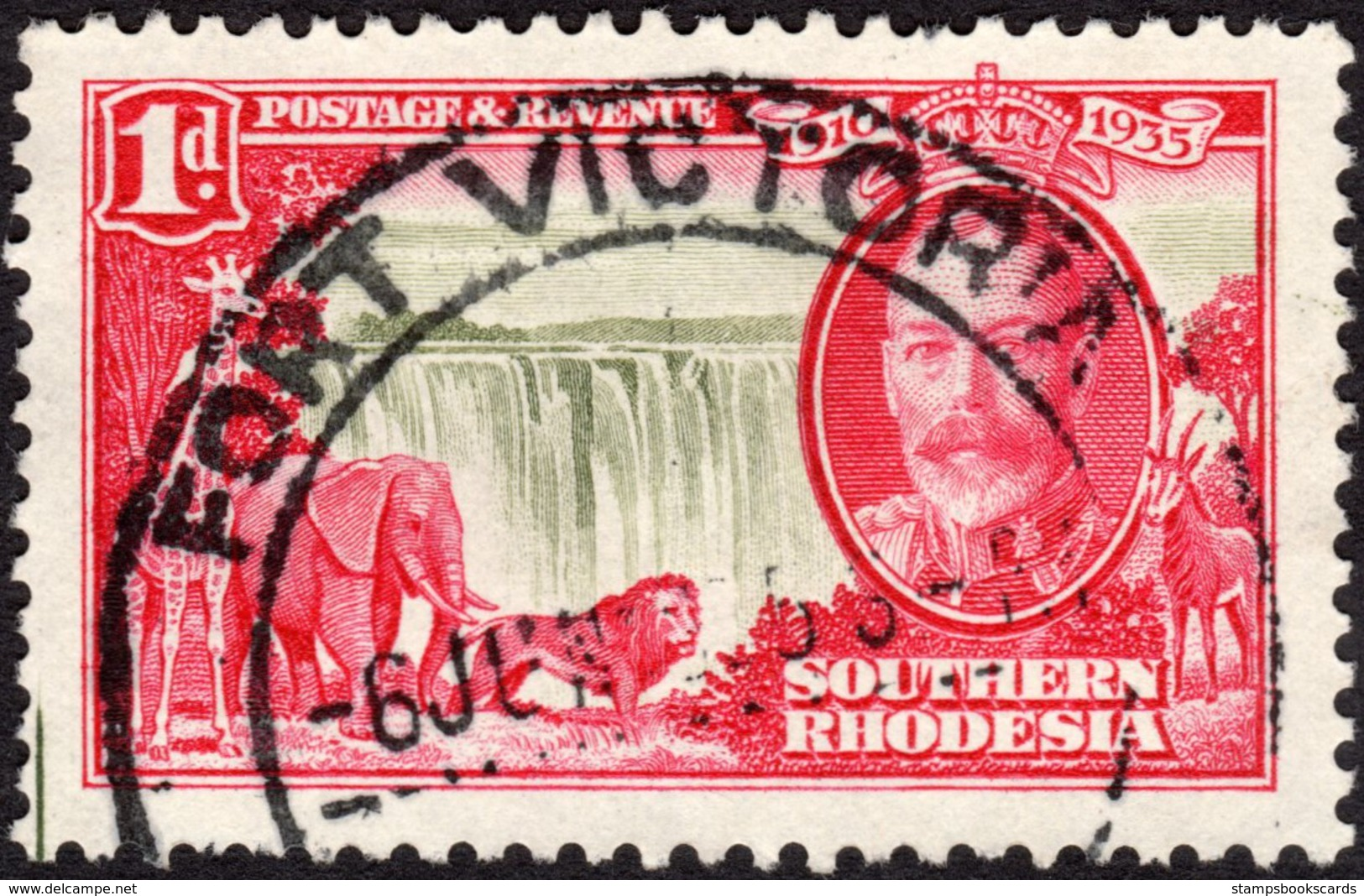
A stamp of colonial Southern Rhodesia used in Fort Victoria.

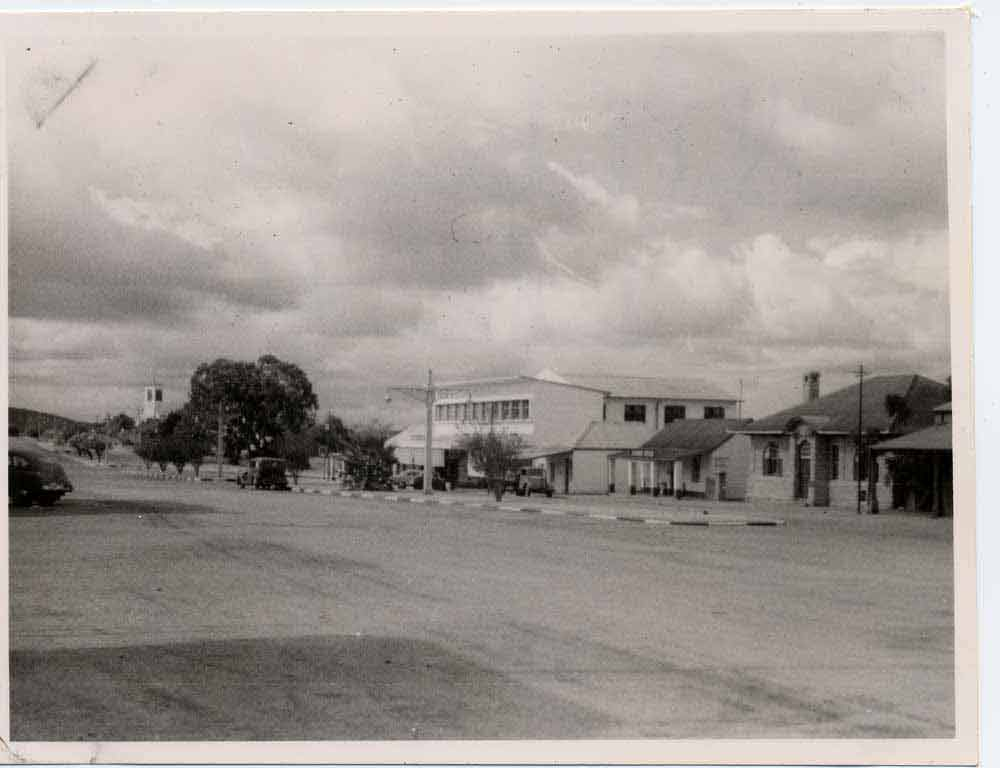
Fort Victoria in 1952.

Masvingo, formerly known as Fort Victoria, is a city in southeastern Zimbabwe and the capital of Masvingo Province. The city lies close to Great Zimbabwe, the national monument from which the country takes its name and close to Lake Mutirikwi, its recreational park, the Kyle dam and the Kyle National Reserve that is home to a range of animal species. It is mostly populated by the Karanga people who form the biggest branch of the various Shona tribes in Zimbabwe.

== History ==
The city was known as Fort Victoria until 1982, when its name was briefly changed to Nyanda, after a mountain about 10 kilometres south of the town, on the Masvingo to Beitbridge Road. That led to protests, because "nyanda" means "one who has lice", and public sentiment was that Masvingo would be more reflective of the history of the city. Within a few months, the name was changed to Masvingo, which means "fort" in Shona, and the Great Zimbabwe, which is essentially a walled fort, is often referred to as "Masvingo eZimbabwe" or sometimes "Masvingo eVitori", a translation of the original name.

Masvingo is the oldest colonial settlement in Zimbabwe which developed around an encampment established in 1890, when the British South Africa Company "Pioneer Column" of the first European colonists passed through on their way to what became Salisbury, now Harare. The Old Fort national monument is located in the center of town, and was erected in 1891 as one of a series of fortifications to guard the route from Salisbury to the south. The very first cricket match in Zimbabwe is said to have taken place close by, in 1890.

== Demographics ==
The population was approximately 15,000 in 1970; 30,523 in 1982 and rose to 51,743 in 1992. It had a population of approximately 58,000 in 2002. Masvingo is located 292 kilometres (181 miles) south of Harare. Most of the local population belongs to the Karanga and Manyika, Shona sub-tribes. The city is divided into suburbs including Mucheke, Rujeko, Rhodene, Target Kopje and Eastvale. The suburbs are divided into high-density, middle-density and low-density suburbs. Mucheke, the oldest township and Rujeko are the most populous high-density suburbs. Mucheke is also the site of the city's main bus rank as well as the stadium which is named after the ghetto. KMP and Runyararo suburbs are relatively new high and medium density suburbs beyond Mucheke. The middle-density suburbs are Eastvale located close to Zimuto Police Camp and Target Kopje located on the southern part of town on a small hill close to Flamboyant Hotel. Rhodene, a low-density suburb on the northern part of the city centre, is the most affluent suburb in Masvingo. A new suburban development, Zimre Park, is also taking shape to the north east of the town along Bulawayo Road. Another suburban development is taking place close to the affluent Clipsham Park and is aptly named Clipsham Heights as it straddles the hills running parallel to the Beitbridge-Masvingo road. Masvingo also has peri-urban plots such as Morningside, Glenlivet, and Bushmead.

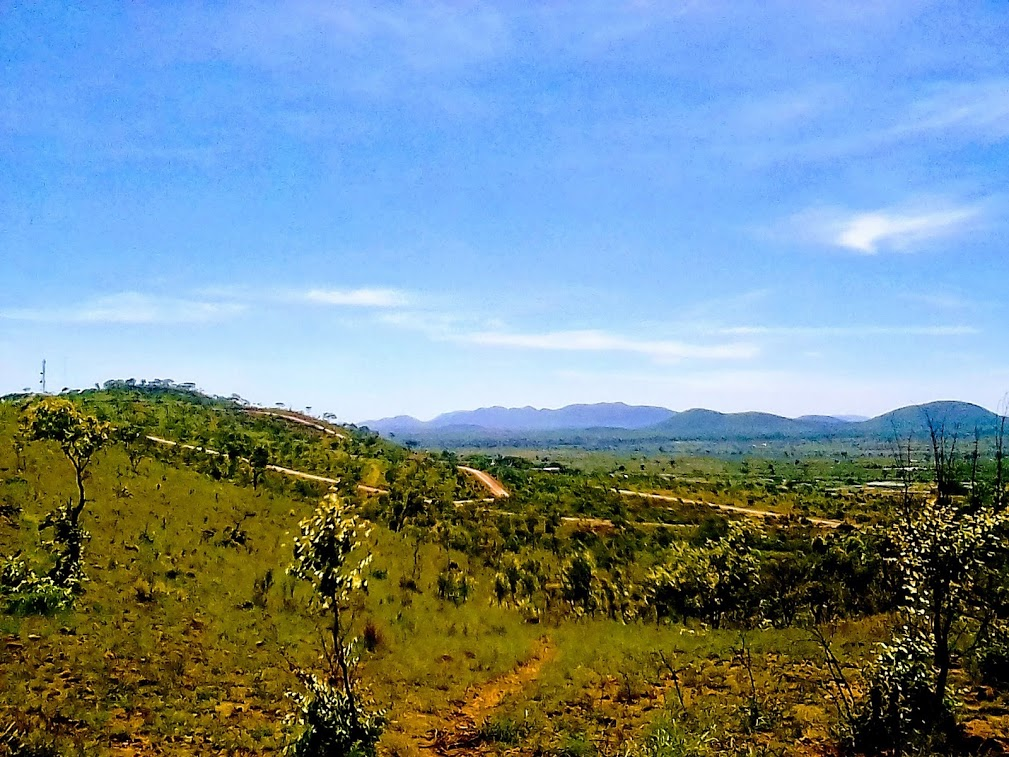
Clipsham Heights, an expansion of suburbs in Masvingo.

== Education ==
Masvingo Polytechnic, Great Zimbabwe University, Bondolfi Teachers College, Morgenster Teachers College and Masvingo Teachers College are the main centres of higher education in the city. The three institutes are run by the government, while Bondolfi and Morgenster are privately owned. Great Zimbabwe University grew out of what was once Masvingo State University. Reformed Church University (RCU) is another university 25 km (16 mi) south of Masvingo run by the Reformed Church of Zimbabwe. It was formerly the Great Zimbabwe University. Masvingo Teachers' College is one of the government run colleges from which Great Zimbabwe devolved. The college has still remained at the campus and the university has a new site. Other teachers' colleges around Masvingo include the Reformed Church of Zimbabwe run Morgenster Teachers' College and the Catholic run Bondolfi Teachers' College. High schools in the city include Victoria High School, located just north of the city centre. Kyle College, Masvingo Christian High School, Ndarama High School and Mucheke High School. There are also privately run high schools commonly referred to as colleges around the city. Pamushana High School, Zimuto High school, Gokomere High School are some of the highly esteemed mission boarding schools in Masvingo Province and are all located few kilometres outside town.

== Geography ==
The landscape in southern Zimbabwe is relatively flat, interspersed with rounded granite mountains. Known as kopjes (Dutch: little heads), they are often quite smooth. Msasa trees dominate the savannah landscape, with the occasional baobab tree. The weather is hot and dry throughout the year, except during the summer when the rains come. There is a range of small hills to the south of the city centre. Mucheke and Shagashe rivers run close to the centre and both of them act as de facto boundaries of the central business district. Robert Mugabe way, one of the city's main streets, is lined with pine trees adjacent to some of the oldest buildings in Zimbabwe such as The victoria hotel and the building opposite to it that now houses The High Court of Zimbabwe. The tallest building is the 9-storey Zimre center located in the CBD. The Bell Tower is a historical building and formed part of the fort erected by the British South African Company in 1892 to protect settlers around Fort Victoria.

The town lies near Lake Mutirikwi and is home to a nine-hole golf course and a freight railway line. It lies on the Mucheke River, with a civic centre at the town centre. Shagashe Game Park and an Italian memorial church built during World War II are nearby. Masvingo also has an airstrip. The national airline, Air Zimbabwe, has reintroduced a domestic flight connecting Masvingo to Harare in the north and Buffalo Range in the south starting on 5 December 2014.

Masvingo is situated in a drought-prone area, with average rainfall of 600 mm/a. The raw water source for the city is Lake Mutirikwi. Apart from providing water for the city, Lake Mutirikwi supports water supply schemes for several riparian farmers and large sugar cane irrigation schemes in the Triangle, Zimbabwe and Hippo Valley areas. The storage capacity of the lake, which was completed in 1960, is 1,378 million cubic metres (48.7 billion cubic feet).

Climate data for Masvingo (1961–1990, extremes 1951–present)
Month	Jan	Feb	Mar	Apr	May	Jun	Jul	Aug	Sep	Oct	Nov	Dec	Year
Record high °C (°F)	38.9 (102.0)	39.0 (102.2)	37.2 (99.0)	35.1 (95.2)	34.0 (93.2)	31.3 (88.3)	31.2 (88.2)	34.9 (94.8)	38.5 (101.3)	40.1 (104.2)	39.0 (102.2)	39.6 (103.3)	40.1 (104.2)
Mean daily maximum °C (°F)	28.1 (82.6)	27.4 (81.3)	26.9 (80.4)	25.9 (78.6)	24.1 (75.4)	21.5 (70.7)	21.6 (70.9)	24.4 (75.9)	27.4 (81.3)	29.2 (84.6)	28.7 (83.7)	28.0 (82.4)	26.1 (79.0)
Daily mean °C (°F)	22.9 (73.2)	22.2 (72.0)	21.4 (70.5)	19.4 (66.9)	16.4 (61.5)	13.9 (57.0)	13.6 (56.5)	16.2 (61.2)	19.6 (67.3)	21.8 (71.2)	22.9 (73.2)	22.7 (72.9)	19.4 (66.9)
Mean daily minimum °C (°F)	17.2 (63.0)	16.9 (62.4)	15.4 (59.7)	12.7 (54.9)	8.7 (47.7)	5.8 (42.4)	5.4 (41.7)	7.7 (45.9)	11.4 (52.5)	14.8 (58.6)	16.1 (61.0)	17.1 (62.8)	12.4 (54.3)
Record low °C (°F)	9.7 (49.5)	10.0 (50.0)	8.1 (46.6)	2.4 (36.3)	0.0 (32.0)	−4.6 (23.7)	−3.6 (25.5)	−0.3 (31.5)	2.5 (36.5)	3.2 (37.8)	6.3 (43.3)	8.3 (46.9)	−4.6 (23.7)
Average rainfall mm (inches)	128.7 (5.07)	107.2 (4.22)	65.6 (2.58)	27.9 (1.10)	12.8 (0.50)	5.7 (0.22)	2.7 (0.11)	6.4 (0.25)	10.4 (0.41)	29.6 (1.17)	77.2 (3.04)	140.2 (5.52)	614.4 (24.19)
Average rainy days	10	8	6	3	2	2	1	1	1	3	7	10	54
Average relative humidity (%)	70	74	71	73	67	65	61	53	47	54	66	71	64
Mean monthly sunshine hours	248.0	207.2	244.9	243.0	266.6	249.0	263.5	285.2	279.0	260.4	228.0	217.0	2,991.8
Mean daily sunshine hours	8.0	7.4	7.9	8.1	8.6	8.3	8.5	9.2	9.3	8.4	7.6	7.0	8.2
Source 1: World Meteorological Organization, NOAA (sun and mean temperature, 1961–1990),
Source 2: Deutscher Wetterdienst (humidity, 1968–1974), Meteo Climat (record highs and lows)

== Industry and transport ==
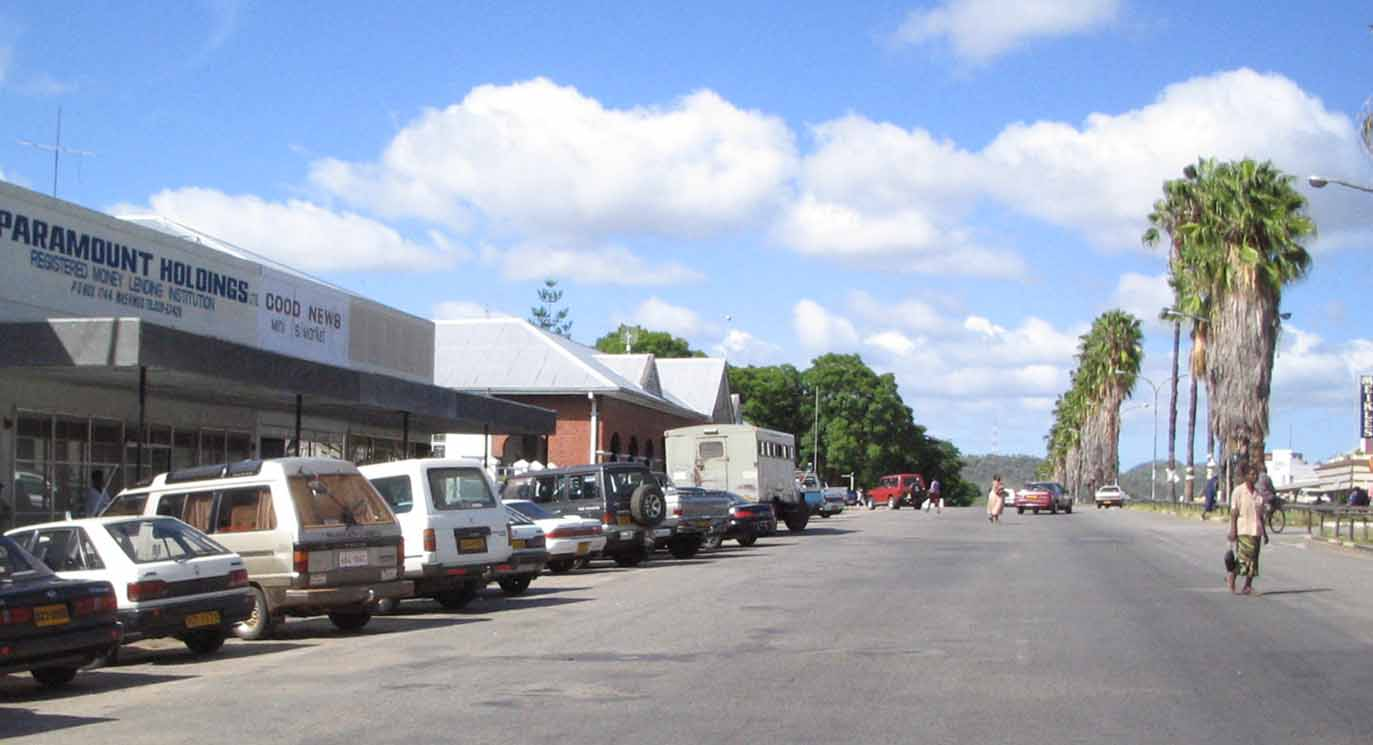
Masvingo in 2005.

The town used to have large cattle ranches, but the country's Land Reform Programme is sometimes blamed for decimating that industry. Small scale farmers now make up the majority of suppliers of agricultural produce. Masvingo is mainly a residential city. The informal sector also dominates industry in town.

=== Tourism ===
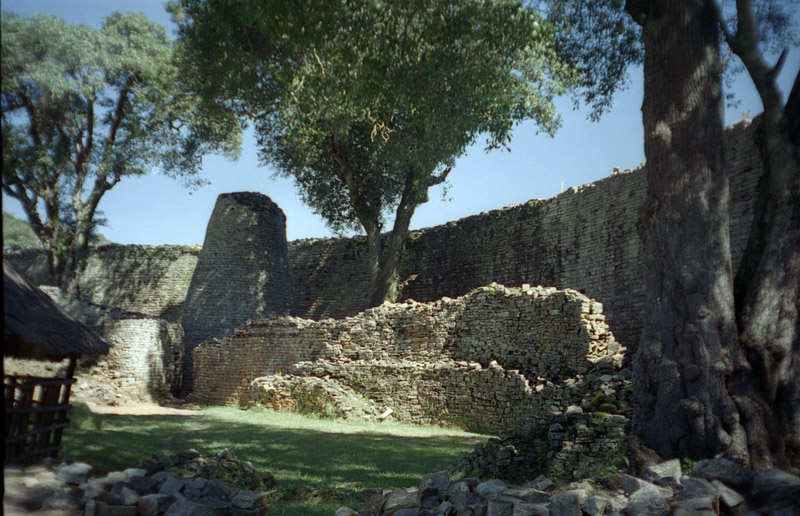
The Great Zimbabwe Ruins, Masvingo

There are a variety of tourist attractions within a thirty-mile (48-kilometre) radius of the town. Within 20 kilometres (12 miles) of Masvingo are the Great Zimbabwe National Monument, old ruins where the country derives its name and the Lake Mutirikwi Recreational Park and Kyle game resort with 12 different species, including the white rhino.

== Film and theatre ==
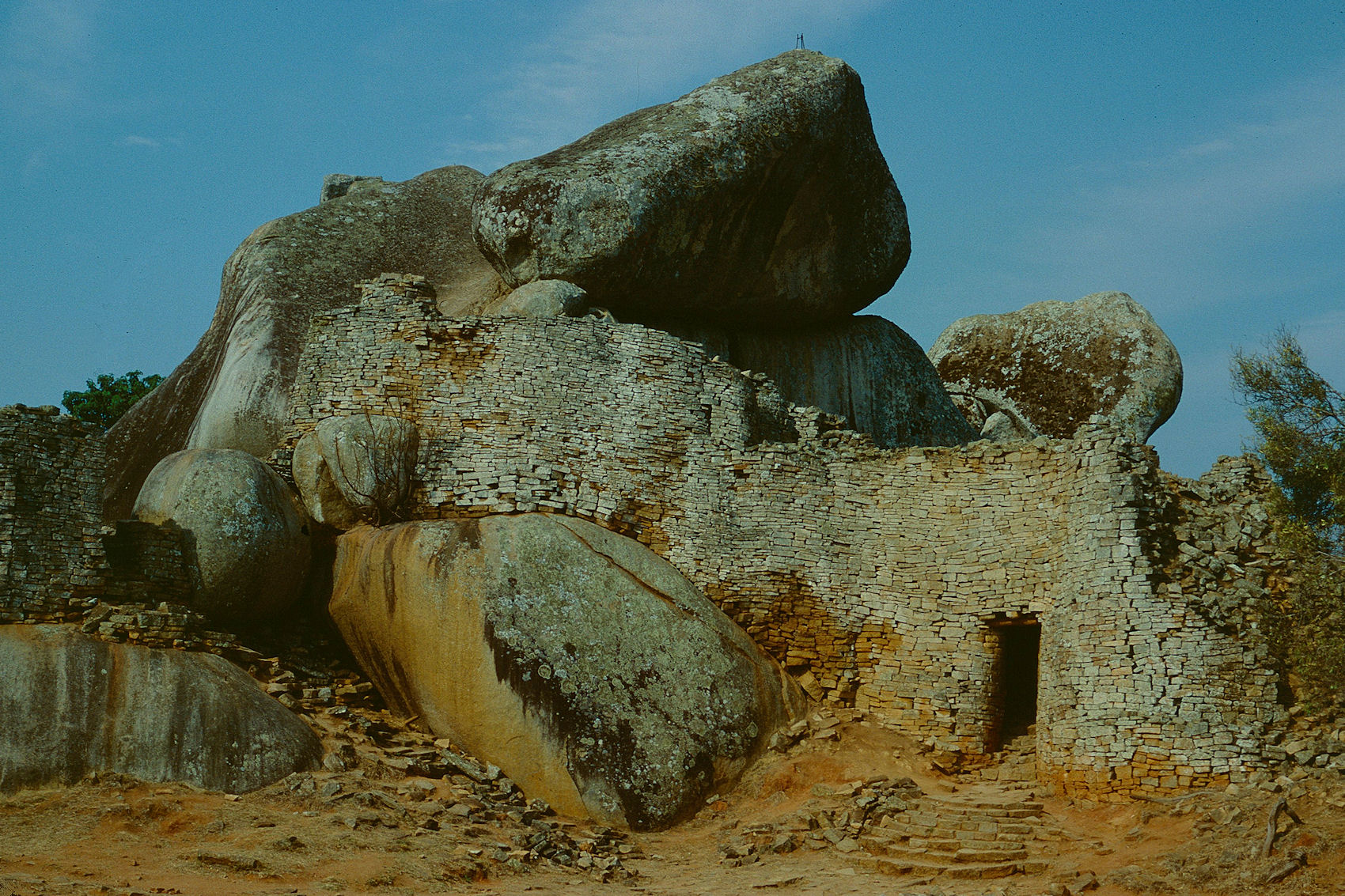
Great Zimbabwe National Monuments

Masvingo is known in the country for producing film and theatre productions that compete with those from Harare and Bulawayo. The city's film and theatre hub is located at the Charles Austin Theatre found at the city's Civic Centre gardens. It was run by the Masvingo Drama Circle from 1971 until its decline in 2015. Young artists took over the running of the facility under the name Masvingo Theatre and Arts Clubs and that resulted in film and theatre productions that have put Masvingo on the map in the arts industry. One notable play that came from Masvingo was a stage play by playwright Charles Munganasa titled Operation Restore Regasi which made international headlines and told the story of Robert Mugabe's fall from power. In 2017, a short film titled Seiko directed by Sydney Taivavashe won the outstanding short film production at the National Arts Merit Awards, Zimbabwe's top entertainment award ceremony making it the first film award to be won by a Masvingo artist. Sabhuku Vharazipi is a comedian from Masvingo who rose to fame in 2013 with his famous drama comedy titled Sabhuku Vharazipi which won the hearts of many locals. He is known for his signature rural folk dressing, a shiny bald head as well as an unmistakable Karanga tone which distinguishes his productions from the others.

== Culture and recreation ==
The major soccer club in the town is Masvingo United, whose home ground is Mucheke Stadium in the suburb of Mucheke. There are many amateur social football clubs in the city and they usually play their games at the various grounds around the city. Annually, a Miss Masvingo Province pageant is held. The city is host to the Charles Austin Theatre located at the civic center, a venue synonymous to many theatre enthusiasts in the country. The film and television industry is growing in the city with the up-and-coming generation at the forefront of the development.

The Southern Rocks, one of the five first-class cricket teams in Zimbabwe until its disbandment after the 2013–14 season, played its home games at the Masvingo Sports Club.

Africa Talent Publishers is a publishing company based in Masvingo. The company was started in 2018 by two Great Zimbabwe University lecturers, Munyaradzi Mawere and Tapuwa Rubaya, to promote indigenous stories and encourage the growth of a reading culture. It is the first such establishment to be founded in Masvingo.

== International relations ==
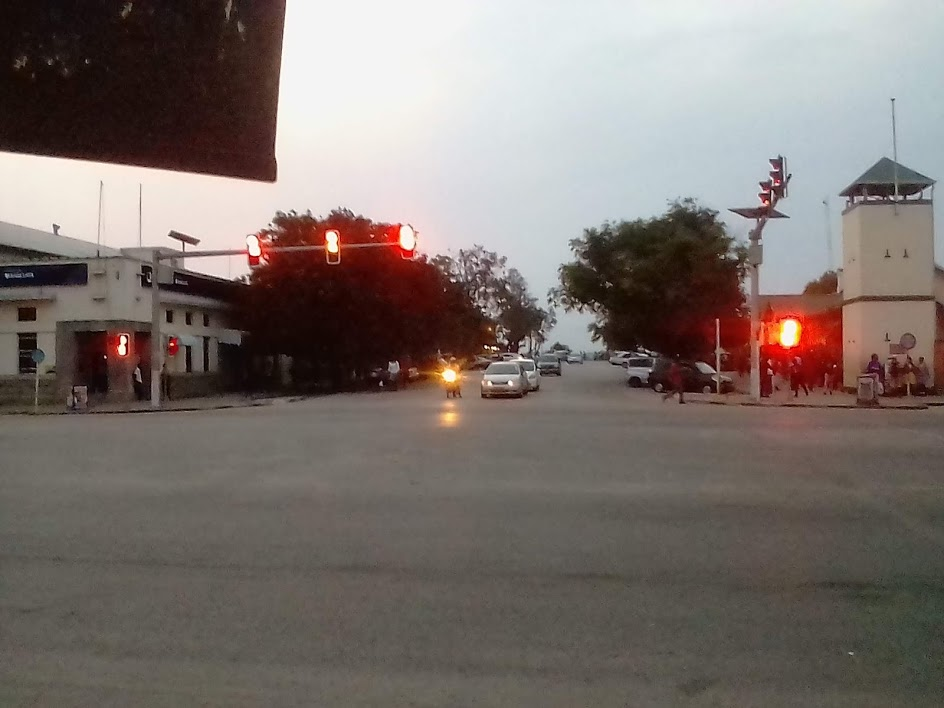
High court intersection Masvingo

=== Twin towns – Sister cities ===
Masvingo is twinned with:

- Kernen, Germany.

The twinning was signed by the town mayors in 1990. This led to the forming of the Kernen-Masvingo association by Kernens Mayor Mr. Haussmann, the school headmaster Franz Miller and its board manager D. Kaiser for 7 years. This organisation has led many projects in Masvingo, including school partnerships, such as that between Karl-Mauch-Schule in Kernen and Bondolfi primary school (25 km), building of a dining room at the old peoples' home in Mucheke, the Runyararo-Frieden day clinic and the construction of 4 buildings at Alpha cottages orphanage. Many other projects have been realised: cholera medicine, water treatment chemicals, many containers with helping goods, introduction of the medicine Viramune/Nevirapin in 2001 to all hospitals in Zimbabwe by D. Kaiser, given free of charge by the German pharmaceutical company Boehringer Ingelheim.

- Middlesbrough, England.

== Notable people ==
- Ashley Burdett, Women's cricketer
- Nelson Chamisa, Politician
- Nox Guni, Musician
- Bruce Makovah, Cricketer
- Charles Manyuchi, boxer
- Garry Mapanzure, Musician
- Paul Matavire, Musician
- Stanislaus Mudenge, politician
- Elias Mudzuri, Politician
- Jesesi Mungoshi, actress
- Simon Muzenda, First Vice President of Zimbabwe
- Walter Mzembi, Politician
- Langton Rusere, Cricket Umpire
- Brian Vitori, Cricketer
- Eddison Zvobgo, politician
- Themba Gorimbo mixed martial artist

== See also ==
- Chiredzi
- Beitbridge
