= Arundel School =

Location
- 28 Arundel School Road, Mount Pleasant; Harare; Zimbabwe
- 17.7645277°S 31.0406769°E

Information
- Type: Private, day and boarding school
- Motto: Gratia Et Scientia (Latin: Grace and Learning)
- Denomination: Anglican
- Established: 1955
- Headmistress: Miss Kudzayi Shawatu
- Forms: 1–4, Sixth Form
- Gender: Girls
- Age: 12 to 18
- Enrollment: 522 (2016)
- Houses: Boarding: 4; Competitive: 6
- Tuition: US$2,075.00 (day); US$3,120.00 (weekly boarding); US$3,840.00 (full boarding); (Note: Termly fees, the year has 3 terms.)
- Affiliations: ATS; CHISZ
- Website: www.arundel.ac.zw

Arundel School is a private, day and boarding school for girls aged 12–18 in Harare, Zimbabwe.

Arundel School was ranked 48th out of the top 100 best high schools in Africa, based upon quality of education, student engagement, strength and activities of alumnae, school profile, internet and news visibility.

Arundel School is a member of the Association of Trust Schools (ATS) and the Head is a member of the Conference of Heads of Independent Schools in Zimbabwe (CHISZ).

== Boarding ==
Arundel School offers boarding accommodation on two levels which are weekly boarding for girls who return home at the weekends, and full boarding places for girls whose families are further afield. There are four boarding houses, Angwa, Sabi, Shire and Kafue, each accommodating age groups of girls under the guidance and care of full-time House Mistresses, Matrons and staff, assisted by senior girls. The Boarding Mistress has responsibility for all the boarding houses and is assisted by the deputy head girl of boarding as well as the boarding prefects.

Shire and Kafue hostels have recently been renovated and house full and weekly boarders forms 2 to 6. Sabi hostel houses form 1 and 2 full and weekly boarders and has also been recently renovated.

== Competitive houses ==
The school is divided into six competitive houses, Austen, Bronte, Burney, Eliot, Gaskell and Irwin. All academic, sporting and cultural achievements earn points for their house. There are many school trophies which are awarded at the end of each term in recognition of the girls individual and collective achievements, including trophies for sporting events, academic achievements, school pride, flower arranging and deportment.

== Notable alumni ==
- E. Tendayi Achiume - Professor in Human Rights Law, former United Nations special rapporteur
- Ellah Wakatama Allfrey OBE - publisher and literary critic
- Professor Fareda Banda - Academic, scholar, author
- Rutendo Chimbaru - Athlete
- Tsitsi Dangarembga - Novelist, filmmaker and playwright
- Mati Hlatshwayo Davis - Director of Health for the City of St. Louis Department of Health
- Amira Elmissiry - Lawyer, African Development Bank
- Alexandra Fuller - Novelist
- Paula Hawkins (author) - Novelist
- Elana Hill - Zimbabwe Olympic Rower
- Fadzayi Mahere - Advocate of the High Court and Supreme Court of Zimbabwe, LLM Cambridge
- Vimbai Mutinhiri - Model, actress, television personality
- Sindisiwe van Zyl - Physician, radio DJ, columnist, health activist and researcher

== See also ==
- List of schools in Zimbabwe
- List of boarding schools
- St. George's College
- Education in Zimbabwe
