= Mount Pleasant, Harare =

Coordinates: 17°46′17″S 31°02′46″E

Mount Pleasant
- Suburb of Harare
- Interactive map of Mount Pleasant
- Country: Zimbabwe
- Province: Harare
- Municipality: Harare

Mount Pleasant is a residential suburb of Harare, Zimbabwe, located in the northern part of the city. Originally a farm, the area was developed for housing in the early 20th-century and was a white suburb until Zimbabwe's independence in 1980. Today, Mount Pleasant is a multiracial community and is one of Harare's more affluent suburbs.

Mount Pleasant contains a number of shopping centres and businesses. The suburb is home to three secondary schools and five primary schools. The University of Zimbabwe, the oldest and top-ranked university in Zimbabwe, is located in Mount Pleasant, as are Zimbabwe Open University and Arrupe Jesuit University. There are two athletic clubs in Mount Pleasant, the Old Georgians Sports Club and Mount Pleasant Sports Club. The area is represented in Parliament by the Mount Pleasant constituency. Mount Pleasant is bordered by the Avondale West, Vainona, Emerald Hill, Belgravia, and Marlborough suburbs.

== History ==
Mount Pleasant was originally a farm, also named Mount Pleasant, until it was developed for residential housing beginning in 1902. Little is known about the genesis of Farm No 10, which was called Mount Pleasant, as the original owner is not known. John Kiddle sold it to Mollie Colenbrander for £100 after owning it for just five days. However, because of water issues, no development took place until 1902 when it was acquired by the Cape Town property developer and recent immigrant Alfred Blackburn, who also acquired and subdivided Avondale, and developed both areas into residential subdivisions. By the end of the Second World War, Mount Pleasant had become an extremely desirable place to live and was forever changed by the opening of the University of Rhodesia in 1953.

== Geography ==
Mount Pleasant is located in the northern part of Harare, and is bordered by the Vainona, Pomona, Emerald Hill, Belgravia, and Marlborough suburbs. From the postwar era to the 1980s, generations of wealthy residents built dozens of stately homes in the area in various styles, including Beaux-Arts architecture, Edwardian, Cape Dutch and post-war modern styles. Along with their homes, the university added much to the vibrancy of the neighbourhood, with bookstores, cafes, restaurants and other amenities creating a bohemian, academic atmosphere, distinguishing it from the quieter suburban enclaves of wealthy families to its North East and the gritty CBD. Other than the homes, landmarks include the Arundel Village and the campus of the University of Zimbabwe. The Mount Pleasant branch of the Harare Library serves the greater area.

The neighborhood is well preserved and maintained, however some of the historic homes have been torn down, renovated into businesses, or transferred to institutional use. The northern part of the neighborhood is dominated by the University of Zimbabwe. In the post-war years the area was home to affluent Anglo-African families evidenced by churches such as All Souls Anglican Church on Westcott Rd and Northside Community Church on Edinburgh Ave. Today the population is more diverse, albeit with a plurality of upper middle class as the wealthiest former inhabitants moved further eastward to Glen Lorne and Borrowdale or emigrated entirely. Left behind were mostly middle-class white Zimbabweans, and a mix of incoming Shona and Indian Zimbabweans along with a transient expatriate population. Today, upper middle-income Zimbabweans of various ethnicities form a majority of the population.

== Economy ==
Mount Pleasant also contains a number of office parks and shopping centres, notably Arundel Office Park, Arundel Village Shopping Centre, The Bridge Shopping Centre, Bond Shopping Centre and Pendennis Shopping Centre. The Zimbabwe School Examinations Council is also headquartered in Mount Pleasant. It also houses the Agriculture and Research Trust (ART) Farm, which engages in research and development of agricultural practices. Mount Pleasant Business Park is home to a number of businesses, including the headquarters of the Postal and Telecommunications Regulatory Authority of Zimbabwe.

== Education ==
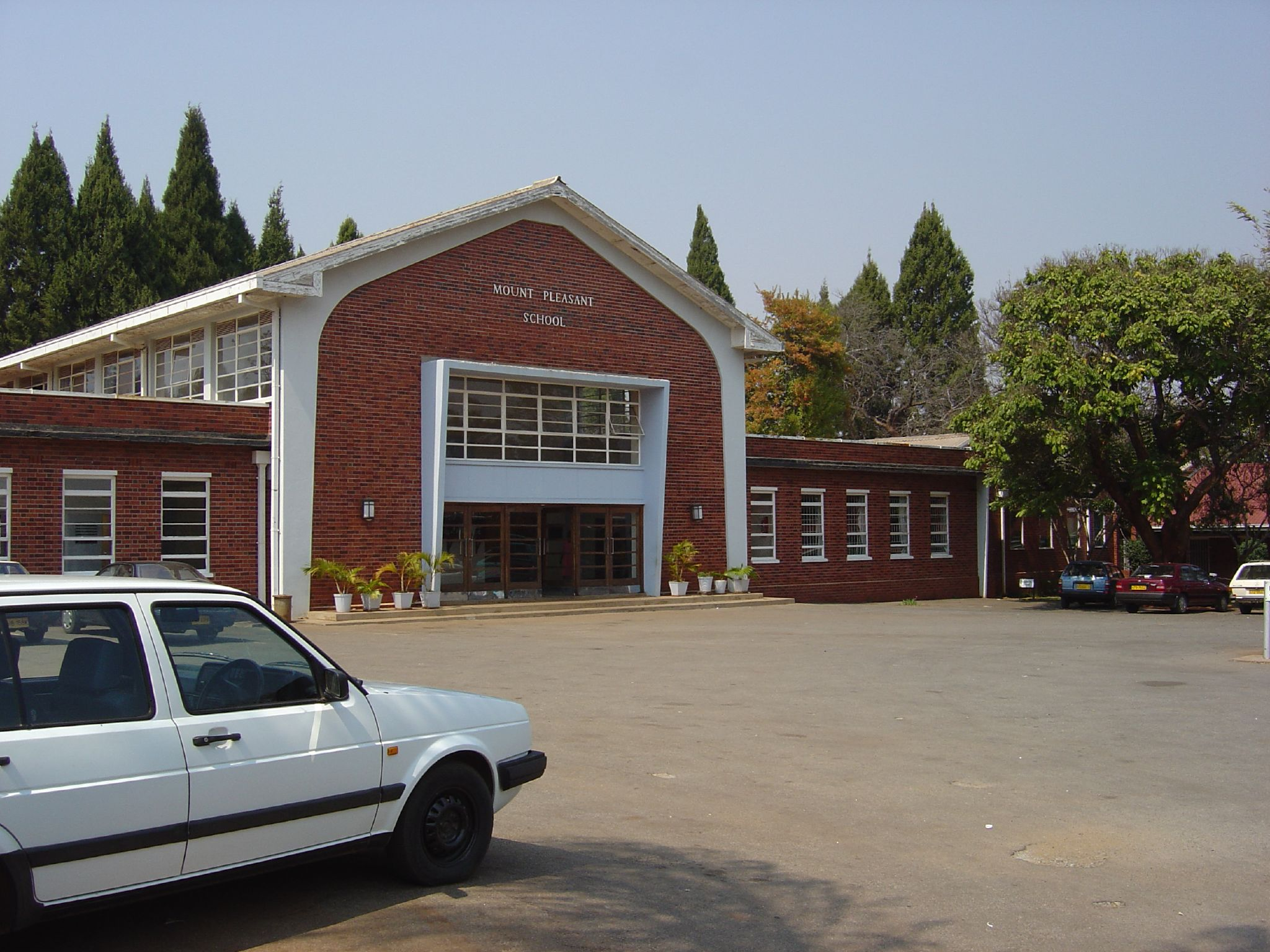
Mount Pleasant School, Mount Pleasant's public secondary school.

Mount Pleasant is home to three universities, three secondary schools, and five primary schools, including both public and private educational institutions. Mount Pleasant's public schools are within the North Central District of Harare Province. Mount Pleasant has two public primary schools, North Park Primary School and Groombridge Primary School. The private schools in Mount Pleasant are Correspondence School, Goldbrook Junior College, and Northwood Adventist Primary School, a Seventh-day Adventist Church-affiliated school. Northwood, which opened in 2014 with 273 students, was ranked one of the top 100 grade 7 schools in Zimbabwe in 2014.

Mount Pleasant is served by one public high school, Mount Pleasant School. There are two private secondary schools in Mount Pleasant: Arundel School, a boarding and day school for girls ages 12–18, and Harare International School, a coeducational day school for students grades Pre-K–12; both schools have enrollments of around 500 students. All three of Mount Pleasant's high schools were included in a 2014 ranking of Africa's top 100 secondary schools. Arundel was ranked 48th, Harare International at 54th, and Mount Pleasant School placed at 65th.

The main campus of the University of Zimbabwe, the oldest and top-ranked university in Zimbabwe, is located at the southern edge of the suburb. Zimbabwe Open University, a distance education institution and the largest university by enrollment in Zimbabwe, is based in Mount Pleasant. Mount Pleasant is also home to Arrupe Jesuit University, one of two Catholic universities in Zimbabwe and one of only two Jesuit universities in Africa.

== Community diversity ==
Mount Pleasant is one of Harare's more racially diverse neighborhoods. Since the 1980s Mount Pleasant had developed into a neighborhood fairly integrated among economic classes and races, albeit with the price of housing rising the further north one travels. Beginning in the mid-twentieth century, Mount Pleasant could boast of numerous prominent residents, many of whom were affiliated with the University of Zimbabwe. Affiliated with the University of Birmingham and multiracial from the start, the university quickly became a liberal bastion of resistance against the oppressive Ian Smith government.

Mount Pleasant's location as the academic and intellectual centre of Harare as well as its large population of well-to-do residents have made it an important cultural and bohemian hub of the city, noted for its independent bookstores, including the Book Club and House of Books Co-op bookstore, on Redhill Road. Nearby Bond Street offers numerous restaurants, bakeries and cafes, along with small grocery stores, hair stylists, and dry cleaners, which add much to the vibrancy of the area.

== Mount Pleasant Heights ==
Mount Pleasant Heights is a newer neighborhood of mostly family homes in the far north of Mount Pleasant to the north and northwest of Harare. The Heights neighborhood is an enclave of residential homes, trees and undeveloped parkland. The neighborhood borders Mount Pleasant proper, and is bounded by the A11 motorway to the west, Ashbrittle to the southwest, and Vainona and Borrowdale to the southeast.

This neighborhood was originally inhabited by wealthy black residents, mostly doctors, lawyers, and other professionals. Most of these families moved to the area as it developed in the nineties to about 2005. Mount Pleasant Heights was initially entirely residential, with no commercial zoning, and single family and rambler houses on very large parcels. The neighborhood is suburban, separated from the roar of life in the nation's capital.

Today the area remains quite suburban, and largely characterised by detached and larger properties, unlike the more dense south, and small neighbourhood businesses and commercial areas to service the growing population. There are also swaths of park land cutting through the neighborhood, such as Wingate Park.

The area is part of the Mount Pleasant Association and residents consider themselves residents of Mount Pleasant. The neighbourhood is known for its abundance of trees, green space and proximity to Wingate Park Golf Club. Most of the neighborhood's housing stock was built in the 1990s, however since 2005 the area has become increasingly popular with non-resident Zimbabweans as an alternative to the pricey Northeast, resulting in higher prices, uneven development and growing sprawl, with many of the original families emigrating or moving out of the area, as hyperinflation favored international buyers, while diminishing locals' savings. Heights students are zoned to Montrose Primary School with many going on to attend high school in Mount Pleasant proper and Emerald Hill.

== Government and politics ==
Mount Pleasant does not have its own police station and relies on the police station in Marlborough. Irregular city garbage collection and littering are problems in Mount Pleasant.

== Notable people ==
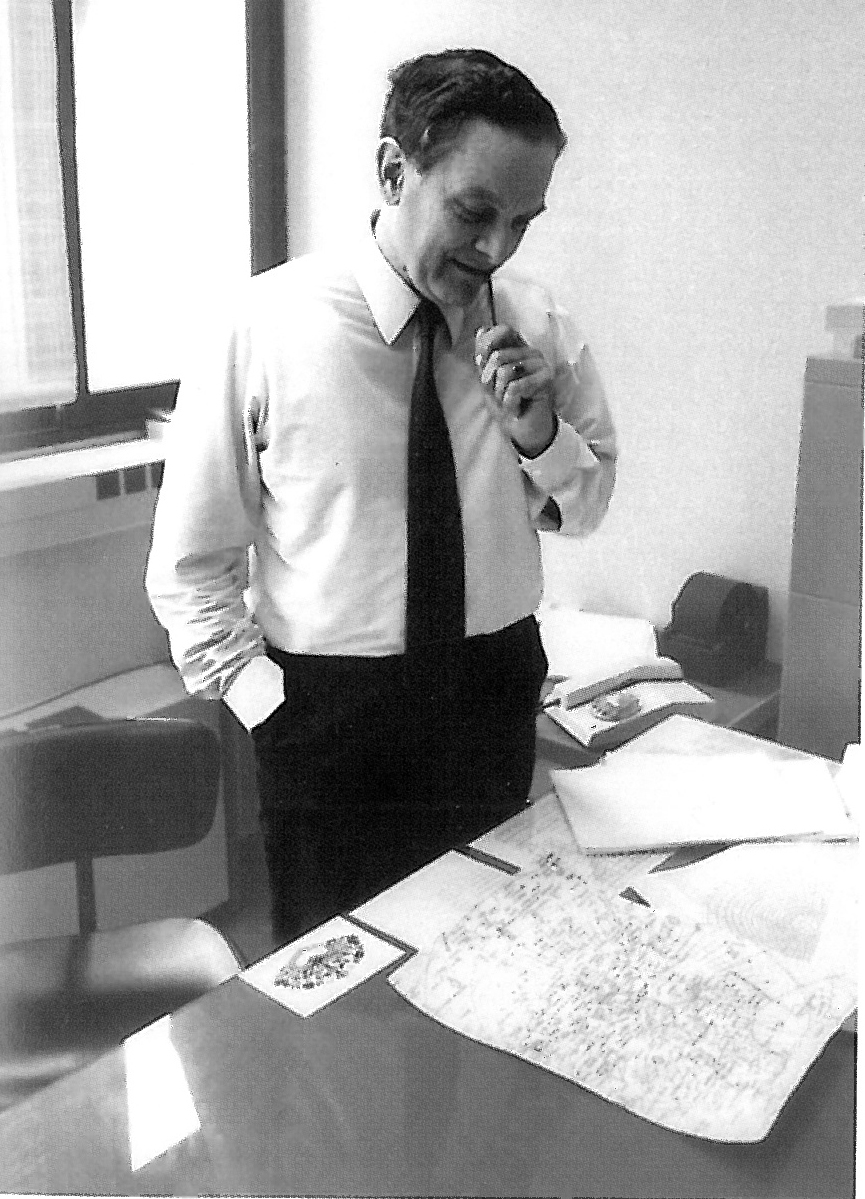
Louis Miles Muggleton

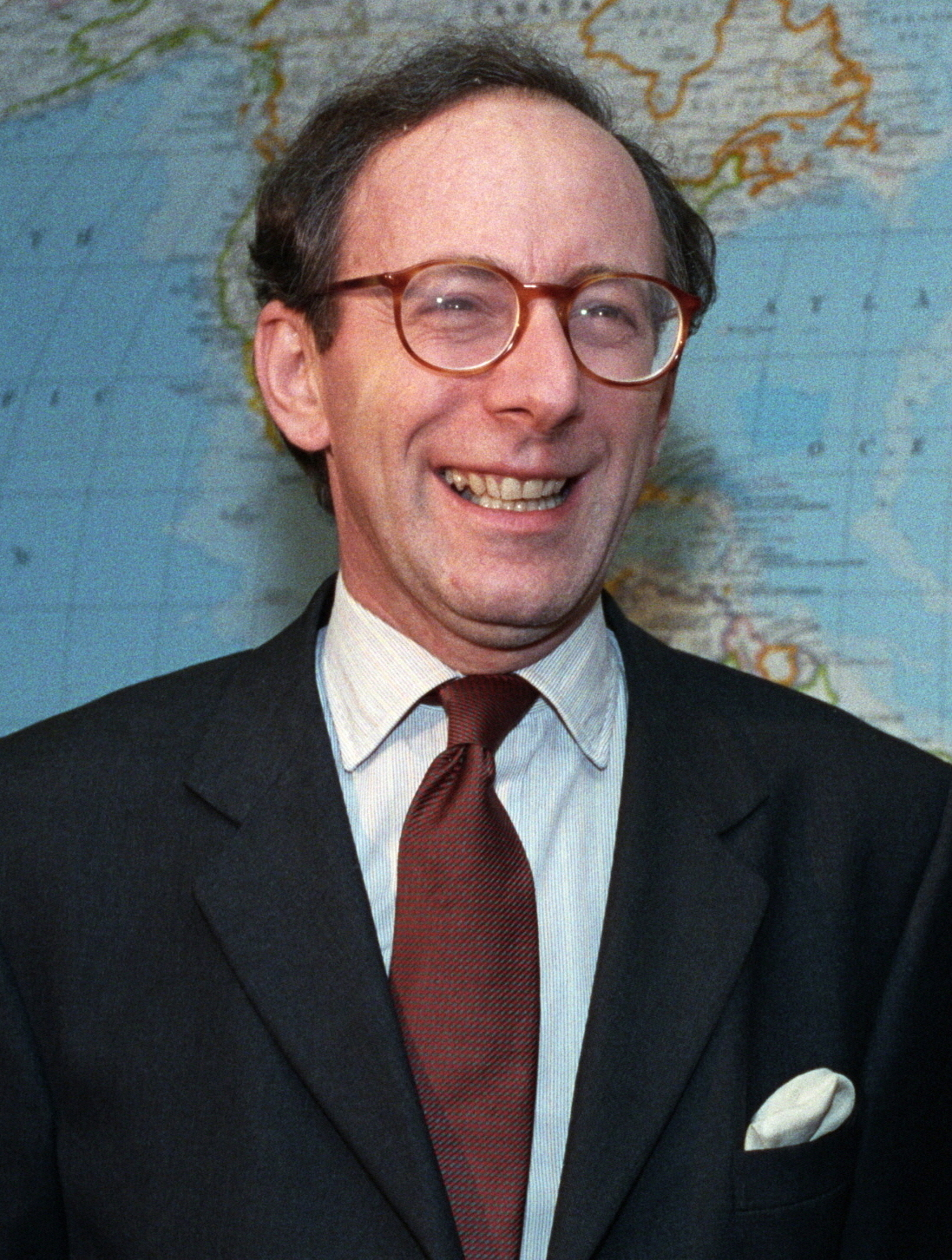
Sir Malcolm Rifkind

The following are notable people were either born in or have lived in Mount Pleasant at one point or another:

=== Academia and faculty ===
- Kathleen Coleman (1975), classicist and professor at Harvard University
- John McDowell, South African philosopher and professor at the University of Pittsburgh
- Peter McLaughlin, Northern Irish-Zimbabwean educator, historian, and school administrator
- Levi Nyagura, mathematician; Vice Chancellor of the University of Zimbabwe since 2003
- Giovanni Arrighi, Italian economist and sociologist; professor at Johns Hopkins University
- David Beach, British-Zimbabwean historian
- Korkut Boratav, Turkish Marxian economist; taught at UZ 1984–1986
- Ernest Bulle, academic and politician; taught African languages at UZ in the 1970s
- Jackson Mutero Chirenje, historian and former professor at Harvard University; former lecturer and chair of the history department at UZ
- Peter Garlake, archaeologist and historian; professor at UZ 1964–1970; forced to leave Rhodesia in 1970 due to his research concluding that Great Zimbabwe was built by the Shona people

=== Business and finance ===
- Gideon Gono, banker; Governor of the Reserve Bank of Zimbabwe 2003–2013
- David Hatendi (1976), businessman and banker; Zimbabwe's first black Rhodes Scholar
- Paul Tangi Mhova Mkondo, businessman, political activist, and commercial farmer
- Blessing Mudavanhu, businessman, banker, and corporate executive

=== Entertainment ===
- Lucian Msamati (1997), British-Tanzanian actor
- Xoliswa Sithole (1987), Zimbabwean-South African actress and documentary filmmaker

==== Diplomats ====
- Boniface Chidyausiku, diplomat; Zimbabwean ambassador to China and North Korea (1990–1996), Angola (1996–1999), the World Trade Organization (1999–2002), the United Nations (1999–2010), and Russia (2011–2015)
- Julian Harston, British diplomat for Her Majesty's Diplomatic Service and the United Nations
- Tichaona Jokonya, politician and diplomat; Zimbabwean Ambassador to Ethiopia 1983–1988; Minister of Information 2005–2006
- Mike Nicholas Sango, Zimbabwe National Army brigadier general and diplomat; Zimbabwean Ambassador to Russia since 2015
- Trudy Stevenson; politician and diplomat; founding member of the Movement for Democratic Change; Member of Parliament 2000–2008; Zimbabwean ambassador to Senegal and The Gambia since 2009

==== Politics ====
- Heneri Dzinotyiweyi, mathematician and Member of Parliament; Minister of Science and Technology Development since 2009; former dean of science at UZ
- Munyaradzi Gwisai, Socialist and political activist; former Member of Parliament
- Owen Horwood, South African economist and politician; South African Minister of Finance 1975–1984; taught economics at UZ in the late 1950s
- Welshman Ncube, lawyer, businessman, and politician; Minister of Industry and Commerce 2009–2013; taught law at UZ 1985–2000; chair of the Department of Private Law at UZ 1988–1996
- Sir Malcolm Rifkind, British lawyer and politician; Member of Parliament 1974–2015; British Foreign Secretary 1995–1997; was an assistant lecturer at UZ 1967–1968.

==== Lawyers and judges ====
- Simpson Mutambanengwe (1959), Zimbabwean-Namibian lawyer and judge; justice of the High Court of Zimbabwe 1986–1994; Justice of the High Court of Namibia 1994–?; he also served on the Supreme Court of Namibia; acting Chief Justice of Namibia 2004; Chairman of the Zimbabwe Electoral Commission 2010–2013
- Tawanda Mutasah, lawyer and senior director of law and policy at Amnesty International
- Mkhululi Nyathi (1999) lawyer and former member of the Zimbabwe Electoral Commission
- Bharat Patel (1975), acting Attorney General of Zimbabwe 2003 and 2007–2008; Justice of the High Court of Zimbabwe 2005–2013; Justice of the Supreme Court of Zimbabwe since 2013
- Vusi Pikoli (1988), South African lawyer; Director of the National Prosecuting Authority 2005–2007
- Shafimana Ueitele (1990), Namibian lawyer and judge; former Electoral Commissioner of Namibia and Justice of the High Court of Namibia

==== Activists ====
- Sarah Kachingwe (1961), politician and activist; first black female to enroll at the then-University College of Rhodesia in 1957
- Lovemore Madhuku (1990), lawyer and democracy activist
- Alex Magaisa (1997), lawyer and former advisor to Prime Minister Morgan Tsvangirai; lecturer at the University of Kent
- Fadzayi Mahere (2008), lawyer and political activist
- Betty Makoni, educator and female sexual abuse victims' activist
- Diana Mitchell, writer and political activist
- Daniel Molokele (1999), lawyer and democracy activist
- Earnest Mudzengi (2001), human rights and democracy activist
- Everjoice Win (1988), feminist activist

=== Journalism and media ===
- Michael Holman (1968), journalist and novelist; Africa editor for the Financial Times
- Trevor Ncube, businessman and newspaper publisher

=== Literature ===
- Catherine Buckle (1979), farmer and writer
- Shimmer Chinodya, novelist
- Chirikure Chirikure, poet, writer, and musician
- Tsitsi Dangarembga, novelist and filmmaker
- Petina Gappah, lawyer, writer, and novelist
- Chenjerai Hove, poet, novelist, and essayist
- Alexander Kanengoni, writer
- Dambudzo Marechera, novelist, playwright, poet, and short story writer
- Albert Nyathi, poet
- Len Rix, translator of Hungarian literature
- Irene Sabatini, novelist
- Elinor Sisulu, Zimbabwean-South African writer and activist

=== Medicine, science, and technology ===
- Sir Michael Berridge, British physiologist and biochemist
- Pride Chigwedere, physician and HIV/AIDS researcher
- Rachel Chikwamba, biopharmaceutical researcher
- Solomon Guramatunhu, ophthalmologist
- Steven Hatfill (1984), American physician, virologist, and biological weapons researcher
- Jonathan Hutton (1984), British-Zimbabwean ecologist and conservationist; professor at the University of Kent
- Tonderai Kasu, Substantive Director of Health and Environmental Services for Chitungwiza
- Bothwell Mbuwayesango, pediatric surgeon who successfully separated conjoined twins in 2014
- Francisca Mutapi, parasite immunologist and the first black female professor at the University of Edinburgh
- Madeline Nyamwanza-Makonese (1970), physician and first female doctor in Zimbabwe

=== Music ===
- Viomak, musician and political activist

=== Religion ===
- Albert Chama, Zambian Anglican bishop; Archbishop of Central Africa since 2011
- Rob Nairn, South African lawyer and Tibetan Buddhist teacher and author
