= 2014 SIU Edwardsville Cougars men's soccer team =

American college soccer season

2014 SIU Edwardsville Cougars men's soccer

MVC Tournament Champions

NCAA Division I Men's Soccer Tournament 2nd Round
- Conference: Missouri Valley Conference
- Record: 8–9–4 (4–1–1 MVC)
- Head coach: Brian Jones & David Korn (Co-head) (1st season)
- Assistant coach: Scott Gyllenborg
- Home stadium: Ralph Korte Stadium; Capacity, 4,000

2014 Missouri Valley Conference men's soccer standings
| | Conf. | | | | | Overall |
| Team | W | | L | | T | W | | L | | T |
|---|---|---|---|---|---|---|---|---|---|---|
| Missouri State | 4 | – | 0 | – | 2 | 9 | – | 5 | – | 4 |
| SIU Edwardsville ‡ | 4 | – | 1 | – | 1 | 8 | – | 9 | – | 4 |
| Evansville | 4 | – | 2 | – | 0 | 6 | – | 11 | – | 1 |
| Drake | 3 | – | 3 | – | 0 | 5 | – | 11 | – | 3 |
| Loyola Chicago | 2 | – | 2 | – | 2 | 8 | – | 6 | – | 5 |
| Bradley | 1 | – | 5 | – | 0 | 9 | – | 11 | – | 0 |
| Central Arkansas | 0 | – | 5 | – | 1 | 2 | – | 13 | – | 1 |
‡ - MVC Tournament champion + - Invited to the NCAA Division I Men's Soccer Championship; As of November 23, 2014; Rankings from NSCAA

The 2014 SIU Edwardsville Cougars men's soccer team represented Southern Illinois University Edwardsville during the 2014 NCAA Division I men's soccer season. The Cougars were coached in 2014 by co-head coaches Brian Jones and David Korn. The team played their home games on Bob Guelker Field at the Ralph Korte Stadium as an affiliate member of the Missouri Valley Conference (MVC).

== Preseason ==
Fourteen players returned from the 8-9-2 team of 2013, including two first team All-Missouri Valley Conference performers: forward Christian Volesky and defender Matt Polster; All-MVC Honorable Mention defender Justin Bilyeu; and MVC All-Freshmen defenders Andrew Kendall-Moulin and Austin Ledbetter . They were joined by five "redshirted" freshmen who were in the group that was named one of the nation's top recruiting classes of 2013, a redshirted junior, a transfer who was First Team All-Conference in The Summit League, and five freshmen. The six member incoming 2014 class, like its predecessor, was rated one of the top recruiting classes in the country. SIUE is the only Division I team with 100% of its 2013 scoring players back for 2014.

For the second season in a row, defender Matt Polster was one of 32 players named to the preseason watch list for the Missouri Athletic Club’s Hermann Trophy, college soccer's highest individual award.

In Top Drawer Soccer's (TDS) preseason list of the top 100 college soccer players in the nation, Mat Polster was ranked #48. Additionally, the TDS preseason rankings of the top 20 players in each conference ranked Polster #2, Christian Volesky #3, Andrew Kendall-Moullin #17, and Justin Bilyeu #18 in the MVC.

In the MVC preseason coaches' poll, SIUE was picked to finish fifth. Seniors Matt Polster and Christian Volesky were named to the pre-season All-MVC team, Polster for the third season in a row, Volesky for the second.

In exhibition games, the Cougars defeated the Oakland Golden Grizzlies 3–1 at Korte Stadium and the IUPUI Jaguars 2–0 in Indianapolis.

== Season ==
Former coach Scott Donnelly set up a demanding schedule which included five teams that were ranked during the 2013 season, four that were in the NCAA Tournament. There was also a full Missouri Valley Conference schedule and matches against traditional rivals.

Opening the season at home for the first time since 2010, the Cougars outplayed the Virginia Tech Hokies through regulation time in a game that featured outstanding goalkeeping on both ends of the field. Despite SIUE dominating the shooting 16–8, Tech's Brad Vorv found himself free and lofted a 25' shot past Kent Kobernus in the 97th minute, giving the Hokies the "golden goal" victory.

On a day dominated by the heat, with the game punctuated with several water breaks, SIUE and Tulsa missed numerous scoring opportunities, especially on set pieces. The Cougars scored first, with Scheipeter passing up a contested shot to hit Volesky, who faced the open net. A Cougars turnover started the action that led to the Golden Hurricane's Neil putting in a shot from a difficult angle to tie the game. Despite the two sides taking 35 shots (Tulsa leading 23–12), the game was mainly a defensive struggle, remaining tied at one goal apiece through regulation and the first extra time period. Cougar goalkeeper Kobernus made his eighth save on another shot by Neil, but when he failed to corral the ball, Barrett put the rebound into the net to give Tulsa the double-overtime "golden goal" win.

Playing a mid-week game at Memphis, the Cougars dominated the early play, with Volesky scoring off a pass from Garet Christianson. As play continued, SIUE seemed to grow complacent and careless, passing beyond intended teammates, directly at defenders, or to no one in particular. As such play continued, the Tigers gained confidence and took control in the last ten minutes of the first half. Memphis remained in control through the second half, with Khulfan scoring on a breakaway and the Tigers outshooting the Cougars 8−4 for the half. SIUE seemed to be back in control in their third extra time game in three matches. They outshot the Tigers 4–0 in the first overtime period and took the first shot of the second OT. But Ledbetter then drew his second yellow card and was ejected. Memphis, a man up, immediately applied the pressure and scored only 23 seconds after the red card, giving the Cougars their third "golden goal" loss in three games.

Hosting undefeated Butler in the first-ever meeting between the two programs, the Cougars set a school record with four consecutive extra time games for the first time in the program's 48-year history. SIUE dominated play in the first half, with Volesky scoring on a pass in the box from Hackett. On Butler's only first half threat, Kendall-Moulin fouled the Bulldog's Goldsmith in the box, with Postlewait scoring on the penalty kick. Butler came out on the offensive to start the second half, taking the first three shots, but the Cougars took charge again, yet were unable to get anything past the Bulldog's goalkeeper. In the first extra period, an SIUE player was fouled amidst a crowd directly in front of the goal mouth; the Cougar's best winning chance of the young season went astray as Volesky's penalty kick bounced off the post and away. The two sides traded possessions, with both defenses turning aside repeated attacks through the second extra time period, and the game ended with SIUE getting its first point of the season on a frustrating draw.

In a mid-week road game, the Cougars once more dominated early play, and Volesky scored his fourth goal in five games off a pass from Garet Christianson. The 'Roos had managed only a couple of long-distance shots before an uncharacteristic turnover by Polster left his SIUE teammates out of position, and UMKC scored an easy tying shot on a rebound of a missed first shot. Sloppy passing and an inability to either score on set pieces or cleanly clear the ball from the defensive end have continued to be a problem at odds with SIUE's strong soccer tradition. Repeated failures to clear set up a second UMKC goal, putting the Cougars into a position of trailing in the score during regulation time for the first time this season. Repeated failures to score on corner kick after corner kick and a Polster penalty kick that was saved by the 'Roos' goalkeeper, McGaughey, left the Cougars with one more loss.

Trying for a change in results, the Cougars resorted to changing from single-color uniforms to face DePaul at Korte Stadium. One thing that did change was the early game dominance by SIUE, who surrendered the first goal for the first time since the season opener, when Hunter's rocket of a pass hit Megally just outside the six yard box for an easy shot past a diving Kobernus. The Blue Demons outshot the Cougars in the first half, but SIUE picked up the action after halftime. In the sixtieth minute, Bilyeu fired a pass to a wide-open Ellis, who lofted a chip shot over the DePaul keeper to even the score. Both defenses repeatedly turned aside their opponent, and the match went into extra time for the fifth time in the Cougars' six games. SIUE escaped disaster when the defense held against a free kick from just outside the six yard box after Kobernus fouled by picking up a ball a Cougar had kicked to him, and the first extra period ended with the score still at 1–1. The Cougars stepped up the pressure further in the second overtime period, but DePaul's keeper and defense withstood the onslaught, and the game ended a draw, SIUE's second.

Opening a two-game road trip against ranked Pac-12 teams in California, the Cougars once again scored first against #24 Stanford, with Volesky tapping a loose ball to Polster in the box. Twenty minutes later, the Cardinal's Morris went to the post, drawing Kobernus to him, then tapped a pass to Glover for the tying goal. Stanford was the dominant team in the first half, outshooting the Cougars and taking several corners to the Cougars' none. On a corner kick, the Cardinal's Skundrich fired into the box to the head of Vincent, who scored the go-ahead goal. In the second half, The Cougars outplayed the Cardinal early and late, while Stanford had the better of the middle, but neither side was able to get a shot past the other's keeper, and the home team picked up the win in a game that was much closer than the two teams' records might indicate.

On a Sunday afternoon in Berkeley, the Cougars played another closely contested match at the home of a ranked opponent, the #15 California Golden Bears, Cal scored first when Bonomo intercepted a pass in SIUE's defensive end, putting him one-on-one with Kobernus, and he scored in the 17th minute. Only four and a half minutes later, Hallisey passed to Carrera-Garcia and kept going, with Carrera-Garcia completing the give-and-go back to Hallisey and putting the Golden Bears up 2-0. SIUE had an opportunity to close the gap when the Cal goalkeeper committed a foul inside the box, but Volesky's shot was off the crossbar, and his rebound attempt was wide. The Cougars once again outshot their opponent only to have the other side's goalkeeper make repeated saves, but in the 77th minute, Polster played the ball in to Volesky, who tallied his fifth goal of the season. In another match that was tighter than the opponents' records show, SIUE came out on the short end and head into the MVC schedule while still in search of their first victory.

Opening the MVC season on a Monday night in Evansville, the Cougars managed to accomplish three things they had not done since the preseason---keep a clean sheet, score more than one goal, and win a game. As has often been the case, SIUE dominated play, outshooting the Purple Aces 8 to 3 in the first half and 7 to 3 in the second, with only 2 of Evansville's shots being on goal and both of those saved by Kobernus. The Cougars got on the scoreboard when Volesky was taken down in the box by the Aces' keeper in the 33rd minute; Garet Christianson put the penalty kick into the open left side of the net. In the second half, briefly Evansville put on a strong showing that resulted in four consecutive corner kicks, but the SIUE defense held off the assault. In the 73rd minute, Polster found a loose ball near the top of the 18 yard box and buried it in the right side of the net to double the lead. The Cougars kept trying for additional scoring, but Evansville's keeper held firm, and SIUE had to be satisfied with the 2–0 victory.

In front of a huge Homecoming crowd at Korte Stadium, the Cougars recorded their second consecutive two-goal shutout win. SIUE's defense held off Bradley's MVC-leading offense while the offense outshot the Braves 11–6. After the Cougars had been 0–for–the–season on set plays, in the 18th minute, Kendall-Moulin tapped a corner to Bilyeu who tapped it right back to Kendal-Moulinn, whose crossing pass found Volesky's head for the first goal. Eighteen minutes later, inside the eighteen yard box, Volesky passed to Hoguet, who had just entered the game and fired blazing shot into the corner of the net on his first touch. Through the remainder of the game, the Cougars continued to press for additional scoring while their defense frustrated the Braves repeatedly. After two conference games, SIUE and Missouri State sit atop the MVC standings with 2–0–0 records.

SIUE's third conference game was in Conway, Arkansas, the home of the MVC's other associate member, Central Arkansas. Despite periods of poor passing, the Cougars managed to dominate another opponent, outshooting the Bears in the first half 7–1. UCA's keeper was able to stop all of the Cougars' shots on goal, and the teams went to the locker room tied at nil. The home team stepped up their intensity in the second half, and outshot the Cougars 8–3. But, in the 60th minute, Polster crossed to Danzy, who headed home his first goal of the season. Less than thirteen minutes, Houget hit a long pass to a breaking Garet Christianson; with the UCA keeper coming out, Christianson got to the ball first and nailed the goal from 25 yards out. The Bears got on the board in the 83rd minute when, on a free kick from just outside the box, a Cougar fouled in the box to set up a penalty kick. Kobernus saved on the PK but was unable to control the rebound that was tapped in by Moquete from 5 yards out. It took the Cougars only 36 seconds to go back up by two; the ball was smoothly played into the UCA end, Ellis crossed to Danzy, and the redshirt junior collected his second goal of the game. After the frustrating start of the season, SIUE has a three-game winning streak and sits alone atop the MVC standings.

The Cougars were inhospitable hosts to Drake and played a game of almost total dominance en route to a 4–0 shellacking. Five minutes into the game, Bilyeu took a pass from Kendall-Moullin and fired a high, looping shot from 35 yards out that sank into the top right corner of the net over the Bulldog keeper's reaching hands. On a corner kick in the 37th minute, Drake's keeper turned away the ball, but Polster found the rebound 4 yards out and buried it, giving SIUE a two-goal lead. Four minutes later, Volesky took a long pass in the open, juked the keeper, then passed off to an even more open Christianson, who put the Cougars up 3–0 for the first time in the season. Drake managed to fire off two shots that were high and wide late in the half, and the home squad went to the locker room up by three after outshooting the Bulldogs 7–2. The domination continues in the second half as the Cougars outshot the visitors 8–0 while eight subs saw action. In the 59th minute, Volesky drove into the box, stumbled and fell, picked himself up, regained the ball, and scored his MVC leading seventh goal of the season. That goal gave SIUE, now 4–0–0 in MVC games, its widest margin of victory in a conference game since joining the league in 2010. The Cougar win, combined with the Missouri State draw at Loyola, extended their lead in the Valley standings to five points.

On a Wednesday night in DeKalb, the Cougars started strong but seemed to be continually out of sync without the presence of leading scorer, Christian Volesky. SIUE got off the first four shots of the game and outshot NIU 7–4 in the first half. In the eighth minute, Danzy found himself facing an open net but fired wide. In the 17th minute, Danzy went into the box as Christianson shot, but found himself decked by the Huskies' keeper, hustling out for the save. Danzy atoned for what had gone before when he found himself again facing an open goal, driving Ledbetter's pass from behind the defense into the net. Less than a minute and a half later though, it was the Huskies who forced the action, earning a corner kick that Hall drove in a high slicing arc that Kobernus was only able to get a hand on as it sailed into the net for an "olimpico" goal to knot the score. The Cougars outshot the Huskies 5–4 in the second half, but only one SIUE shot was on goal, while not only were all of NIU's shots on goal, Kobernus was able to save only one. The SIUE defense turned back repeated NIU challenges only to see the front line give the ball right back to the home squad. The Huskies took advantage, scoring three second half goals, and the final 4–1 score was the widest victory margin for a Cougars' opponent since SIUE returned to Division I in 2008.

On a Tuesday night at Louisville's brand new, state-of-the-art stadium, the defenses were at the forefront of the action. The Cardinals outshot the Cougars, but most of their shoots were from long-distance and went high and/or wide. Both defenses repeatedly turned away everything that came at them, and the game turned into the Cougar's sixth overtime game of the season. At the end of 110 minutes of furious action, SIUE had played the #22 ranked Cardinals to a 0–0 draw.

On a frigid Saturday night at Korte, the Cougars played the Missouri State Bears for possession of first place in the MVC. As expected, the defenses dominated the game, with both teams spending much time trying to maintain possession of the ball, then attacking and being turned aside. In the 24th minute, only seconds after making a solid save, Kobernus was caught out of position as the Bears' Roberts chipped a shot over him and into the net to give State the lead. As time ran down in the first half, Volesky was fouled hard about 25 yards out. Bilyeu fired the free kick into the box, and Volesky headed in his league-leading eighth goal of the season to knot the score 1–1 with 0:11 on the clock. The second half was another defensive showcase, with both sides shutting out the other. With regulation time ending tied at 1–1, the Cougars tied the school record for most overtime games in a season, with 7 for the third time in four years. Two ten-minute extra-time periods ended with the score still 1–1, SIUE still leading the MVC, while Missouri State dropped to third place.

The Cougars traveled to Charleston for a Tuesday afternoon game in the rain and mud at Eastern Illinois. SIUE dominated almost every facet of the game except goalkeeping. Outshooting the Panthers 18–8 and 12–6 on goal, the Cougars saw EIU's keeper, Novotny, make 8 saves while Kobernus saved only 3. The offense did get three shots past Eastern's keeper during regulation time, including 2 by junior Lane (only the 2nd and 3rd of his career), and, the score was tied at 3 after 90 minutes. In their school record eighth OT game of the year, the Cougars, playing several non-regulars, went into a second extra period before senior Bauman collected his first career goal and give SIUE their first road victory of the season.

The last game of the regular season was at Loyola in Chicago on a Saturday night. Defense was once more the feature, with both sides repeatedly denying scoring chances by taking the ball away before the offenses could set up to shoot. The Ramblers D was quite physical, resulting in 17 called fouls and 2 yellow cards along with many other plays that could have been called; SIUE was called for only 6 fouls, but Hoguet was booked for committing a hard foul after being twice taken down in the box without a foul being called. The Cougars outshot Loyola 6–2, but a Ramblers' counterattack in the 33rd minute caught Kobernus off the line, forcing him to come further out to challenge Bement, who then scored from 15 yards out. SIUE thought they had evened the score in the 89th minute; Bilyeu's shot rattled around in the net, and the Cougars were well into celebrating when the goal was waved off on an offside call made well after the play. With Missouri State defeating Evansville 1–0, SIUE dropped to second place in the final MVC standings and the #2 seed in the MVC tournament.

The MVC Awards were announced at the banquet held on the evening between the tournament quarterfinals and semifinals. Christian Volesky was named MVC Player of the Year and Mat Polster was named MVC Defensive Player of the Year; both were named to the MVC All-Conference First Team for the third season in a row. Justin Bilyeu and Kent Kobernus were named to the MVC All-Conference Second Team. Garet Christianson, Andrew Kendall-Moullin, and Austin Ledbetter were awarded MVC All-Conference Honorable Mention citations.

== Postseason ==
With the 2nd seed and a first round bye, the Cougars entered MVC Tournament play in the semis versus 6th seed Bradly on the Braves' home turf. Although SIUE mostly dominated possession and play (outshooting BU 27–7), Bradley took the lead in the 22nd minute when, on a counterattack, Lofgren headed in a near-perfect crossing pass. The Cougars kept pressing the action against the Braves' close-checking defense, and in the 78th minute, Bradley was called for a clearly seen shove in the box. Bilyeu buried the penalty kick to tie the match. In the 85th minute, Kendall-Moulin loosed a free kick from near mid-field that arrowed straight to Danzy, who slipped a shot past the diving keeper to give SIUE the lead. Although Bradley tried to press for a tying goal, the Cougar defense held firm, and earned a place in the tourney finals and a rematch with MVC regular season champion Missouri State.

The MVC Championship game saw the defenses of SIUE and Missouri State repeatedly stifle the other squad's best offensive efforts. The Cougars took more shots, 17–9, but the Bears had more shots on goal, 7–4. As in their first meeting, the two teams went into double-overtime (another new SIUE record– 9th OT game of the year). In the 108th minute, on an ESPN Top 10 play, Kendall-Moullin drove a free kick to the left of the goal. Danzy leapt above the crowd and headed the ball into the right side of the net to give the Cougars their first MVC Tournament Championship and send SIUE to the NCAA Division I Men's Soccer Championship tournament for the first time since 1982.

At the conclusion of the conference tournament, Jabari Danzy was named MVC Tournament MVP and was joined on the 2014 MVC Men's Soccer All-Tournament Team by teammates Justin Bilyeu, Kent Kobernus, and Matt Polster. For his efforts, Danzy was also named to the Team of the Week for both Top Drawer Soccer and College Soccer News.

On Monday, November 17, the tournament brackets were announced. SIUE was slated to meet Northwestern in Evanston, with the winner traveling to play the #15 seed, California.

It was frigid on the shoreline of Lake Michigan as the Cougars faced #17 Northwestern on a Thursday afternoon. Dal Santo found himself in his first game action since the preseason when Kobernus was injured before the game began. In one more battle where two stalwart defenses repeatedly turned away determined offenses, the Wildcats took more shots, 16–9, but SIUE trailed only 7–8 in shots on goal, with both keepers making several solid saves. Following a corner kick, there was a wild flurry of action directly in front of the Cougar's goal in the 61st minute— with multiple Wildcats taking shots and several Cougars trying to clear the ball— lasting a good 10–15 seconds before the ball went over the end line for a goal kick. In the 81st minute, Hackett drove into the left side of the Northwestern box; the Wildcats blocked his shot and tried to clear; Scheipeter located the loose ball and booted his first goal as a Cougar from five yards out to give SIUE the lead. Over the last nine minutes, Northwestern pushed hard, even bringing their All-Big 10 keeper to midfield, but the Cougars' defense held firm for the victory and the right to return to California for a rematch with #18 California in the second round of the tournament.

In the return trip to California, SIUE took three of the first four and the last three shots in the game, but Cal, the NCAA's top-scoring team, outshot them for the game, 18–11. After a scoreless first half, the Cougars nearly took the lead in the 63rd minute, but Polster's shot banged off the post. In the 71st minute, Dal Santo deflected a shot for a save, but Sekine fired the rebound into the goal to give the Golden Bears a 1–0 lead that held up for the victory, sending Cal into the round of 16 and ended the Cougars' season.

When the 2014 NSCAA/Continental Tire NCAA Division I Men's All-Region teams were announced on December 10, Christian Volesky and Mat Polster were both named to the West Region First Team.

On December 11, Christian Volesky and Mat Polster were among the 55 college Division I players invited to the 2015 adidas MLS Player Combine to showcase their talents to the coaching staffs of all 20 Major League Soccer clubs.

Mat Polster was named to the 2014 NSCAA Men's University Division Scholar All-America First Team on December 18.

In Top Drawer Soccer's (TDS) preseason list of the top 100 college soccer players in the nation, Christian Volesky was ranked #41, and Matt Polster was ranked #81. In the TDS MVC Postseason Top 20, Christian Volesky was ranked #1, Matt Polster #2, Andrew Kendall-Moullin #3, Justin Bilyeu #6, Austin Ledbetter #9, Garet Christianson #10, and Paul Scheipeter #15.

At the 2015 adidas MLS Player Combine, both Christian Volesky and Matt Polster had standout performances, with Volesky being named the Tom Fitzgerald MLS Combine Most Valuable Player.

On January 15, 2016, MLS held its SuperDraft. Matt Polster was selected by the Chicago Fire as the 7th overall player taken. Christian Volesky was drafted by the Portland Timbers as the 11th pick in the second round and the 32nd pick overall.

== Coaches ==
Scott Donnelly was named as the Cougars' new head coach on December 6, 2013 following Kevin Kalish's unexpected resignation. Donnelly, former head coach at Division II Mars Hill College had been the Cougars' associate head coach for the previous two seasons after coming to SIUE from the same position at Northern Illinois. Assistants are first year coaches David Korn and Scott Gyllenborg, seventh year goalkeepers coach Brian Jones, and first year director of operations Billy Berger.

On August 10, it was announced that coach Scott Donnelly had suddenly and unexpectedly resigned after being recruited to be the new Technical Advisor for the Northeast region with the United States Soccer Federation (U.S. Soccer). Assistants Korn and Jones were named as co-head coaches for the season due to begin play in earnest on August 29.

== Roster ==
Buff background indicates returning players from 2013. Pink background indicates players "redshirted" in 2013.

| # | Name | Position | Height | Weight | Year | Hometown | High School | Transfer from |
|---|---|---|---|---|---|---|---|---|
| 1 | Kent Kobernus | Goalkeeper | 6' | 170 | Senior | Millstadt, Illinois | Belleville West | Wisconsin |
| 2 | Andrew Kendall-Moullin | Defender | 6' | 165 | Sophomore | Atlanta, Georgia; Faribault, Minnesota | Shattuck-Saint Mary's | |
| 3 | Justin Bilyeu | Defender | 6' 2" | 175 | Junior | St. Louis, Missouri | CBC | |
| 4 | Matt Polster | Defender | 6" | 170 | Senior | Las Vegas, Nevada | Palo Verde | |
| 5 | Sean Baumann | Defender | 5'10" | 160 | Senior | Makanda, Illinois | Carbondale | Mercer |
| 6 | Austin Ledbetter | Defender | 5'11" | 160 | Sophomore | St. Charles, Missouri | CBC | |
| 7 | Lewis Ellis | Forward | 5'10" | 175 | Senior | Cambridge, Wales, UK | Millfield School | Memphis |
| 9 | Jabari Danzy | Midfielder | 5' 8" | 160 | R-Junior | Park Forest, Illinois | Marian Catholic | Northern Illinois |
| 10 | Christian Volesky | Forward | 6'1" | 185 | Senior | Henderson, Nevada | Foothill | Denver |
| 11 | Jason Hackett | Forward | 5'7" | 135 | Sophomore | St. Louis, Missouri | Vianney | |
| 12 | Gabe Christianson (redshirt) | Midfielder | 6' | 140 | Junior | Cedar Rapids, Iowa | Kennedy | Northern Illinois |
| 13 | Joel Duncan | Forward | 6" | 155 | R-Freshman | Mt. Vernon, Illinois | Mt. Vernon | |
| 14 | Drew Merideth | Midfielder | 6' | 160 | R-Freshman | East Moline, Illinois | United Township | |
| 15 | Jacob Wieser | Midfielder/Defender | 5'8" | 160 | Junior | St. Louis, Missouri | St. Mary's | |
| 16 | Garet Christianson | Forward | 6'1" | 155 | R-Junior | Cedar Rapids, Iowa | Kennedy | Eastern Illinois |
| 17 | Paul Scheipeter | Midfielder/Defender | 6' | 150 | Junior | St. Louis, Missouri | Vianney | Indianapolis |
| 18 | Devyn Jambga | Forward | 5'11" | 155 | R-Freshman | Harare, Zimbabwe | Harare International School | |
| 19 | Mitchell Williams | Defender | 5'8" | 160 | R-Freshman | Blacksburg, Virginia | Blacksburg | |
| 20 | Travis Hoguet | Forward | 5'8" | 145 | R-Junior | Fairview Heights, Illinois | Belleville East | |
| 21 | Keegan McHugh (redshirt) | Midfielder | 5'11" | 160 | Freshman | St. Charles, Missouri | Francis Howell | |
| 22 | Brett Lane | Defender | 5' 9" | 165 | R-Junior | Peoria, Illinois | Peoria Notre Dame | |
| 23 | Thomas "TC" Hull (redshirt) | Forward | 5' 9" | 150 | Freshman | St. Charles, Illinois | St. Charles East | |
| 24 | Lance Ramsey | Midfielder | 5'11" | 154 | Freshman | Edwardsville, Illinois | Edwardsville | |
| 26 | Sherif Maalouf (redshirt) | Forward | 5'6" | 150 | Freshman | Cairo, Egypt | Holy Family School | |
| 29 | Joe Smith (redshirt) | Goalkeeper | 6' 1" | 160 | Freshman | Royal Oak, Michigan | Royal Oak | |
| 30 | Kyle Dal Santo | Goalkeeper | 5'11" | 155 | R-Freshman | Bolingbrook, Illinois | Benet Academy | |

(redshirt) = Players "redshirted' for the 2014 season.

== Schedule & results ==
Visiting team on the left, home team on the right. Rankings from National Soccer Coaches Association of America (NSCAA) polls.

=== Exhibitions ===
| 08/15/2014 | Oakland | 1–3 | SIUE | Edwardsville, Illinois |
| 7:00 pm CDT | Ben 5' (pen.) | Report | Polster 24' (pen.); Volesky 34' (Lane); Volesky (n/a) | Stadium: Ralph Korte Stadium; Attendance: 2,346; Referee: n/a |

| 08/22/2014 | SIUE | 2–0 | IUPUI | Indianapolis, Indiana |
| 7:00 pm CDT | Garet Christianson (1st half); Danzy (2nd half) | [Report n/a] | | Stadium: IU Michael A. Carroll; Track & Soccer Stadium; Attendance: n/a Referee: n\a |

=== Season ===
| 08/29/2014 | Virginia Tech | 1–0 ^{ot} | SIUE | Edwardsville, Illinois |
| 7:00 pm CDT | Grub (yellow card) 36'; Kirch (yellow card) 43'; Vorv 97' | Report; Live video | Kendall-Moulin (yellow card) 94' | Stadium: Ralph Korte Stadium; Attendance: 871; Referee: Ryan Ash |

| 08/31/2014 | Tulsa | 2–1 ^{2ot} | SIUE | Edwardsville, Illinois |
| 1:00 pm CDT | Rocha (yellow card) 58'; Neil 74' (Matamoros); Barrett 101' (Neil) | Report; Live video | Volesky 63' (Scheipeter & Hackett); Volesdky (yellow card) 64'; Kendall-Moulin (yellow card) 68' | Stadium: Ralph Korte Stadium; Attendance: 480; Referee: Michael Meyerhoff |

| 09/03/2014 | SIUE | 1–2 ^{2ot} | Memphis | Memphis, Tennessee |
| 7:00 pm CDT | Volesky 10' (Christianson); Kendall-Moulin (yellow card) 48'; Kobernus (yellow card) 63'; Ledbetter (yellow card) 76'; Ledbetter (yellow card) 104' (yellow-red card) | Report; Live video | Khulfan 52'; Klipsch (yellow card) 83'; Ciosanski 105' (Williams) | Stadium: Mike Rose Soccer Complex; Attendance: 350; Referee: Doug Damico |

| 09/06/2014 | Butler | 1–1 ^{2ot} | SIUE | Edwardsville, Illinois |
| 7:00 pm CDT | Postlewait 14' (pen.); Fricke (yellow card) 93' | Report; Live video | Volesky 5' (Hackett); Volesky (yellow card) 69'; Danzy (yellow card) 71'; Wieser (yellow card) 94'; Bauman (yellow card) 97' | Stadium: Ralph Korte Stadium; Attendance: 607; Referee: Saul Gonzalez |

| 09/10/2014 | SIUE | 1–2 | UMKC | Kansas City, Missouri |
| 7:00 pm CDT | Volesky 10' (Christianson); Volesky (yellow card) 38'; Lane (yellow card) 72'; Christianson (yellow card) 85'; Kobernus (yellow card) 90' | Report; Live video | Rideout 36' (White); Rinde 53' (Cramer) | Stadium: Stanley H. Durwood Soccer Stadium; Attendance: 312; Referee: Jon Freemon |

| 09/13/2014 | DePaul | 1–1 ^{2ot} | SIUE | Edwardsville, Illinois |
| 7:00 pm CDT | Megally 9' (Hunter) | Report; Live video | Ellis 60' (Bilyeu); Lane (yellow card) 57'; Jambga (yellow card) 76' | Stadium: Ralph Korte Stadium; Attendance: 626; Referee: Doug Ferguson |

| 09/19/2014 | SIUE | 1–2 | #24 Stanford | Palo Alto, California |
| 9:00 pm CDT | Polster (10\Volesky); Polster (yellow card) 22' | Report | Meyer (yellow card) 16'; Glover 31' (Morris); Vincent 42' (Skundrich); Nana-Sinkam (yellow card) 78' | Stadium: Laird Q. Cagan Stadium; Attendance: 475; Referee: Rene Nunez |

| 09/21/2014 | SIUE | 1–2 | #15 California | Berkeley, California |
| 4:00 pm CDT | Volesky (77\Polster) | Report | Hallisey (yellow card) 14'; Bonomo 17'; Hallisey 21' (Carrera-Garcia) | Stadium: Edwards Stadium; Attendance: 321; Referee: Matthew Buckman |

| 09/29/2014 | SIUE | 2–0 | Evansville * | Evansville, Indiana |
| 7:00 pm CDT | Volesky (yellow card) 20'; Christianson 33' (pen.); Ellis (yellow card) 42'; Polster 73' | Report | Teppen (yellow card) 33'; Hajderovic (yellow card) 72'; Schroeder (red card) 73' | Stadium: Arad McCutchan Stadium; Attendance: 362; Referee: Ben Trevino |

| 10/04/2014 Homecoming | Bradley * | 0–2 | SIUE | Edwardsville, Illinois |
| 7:00 pm CDT | Zach Kovacevic (yellow card) 59'; Bell (yellow card) 68' | Report; Live video | Volesky (18\Kendall-Moullin); Hoguet 35' (Volesky); Wieser (yellow card) 65' | Stadium: Ralph Korte Stadium; Attendance: 4,665; Referee: Saul Gonzalez |

| 10/11/2014 | SIUE | 3–1 | Central Arkansas * | Conway, Arkansas |
| 7:00 pm CDT | Danzy (60\Polster); Christianson (73Hoguet); Lane (yellow card) 82'; Danzy 83' (Ellis) | Report; Live video | Moquet 83'; Woody (yellow card) 83' | Stadium: Bill Stephens Track/Soccer Complex; Attendance: 198; Referee: Doug Wolf |

| 10/18/2014 | Drake * | 0–4 | SIUE | Edwardsville, Illinois |
| 7:00 pm CDT | Reutzel (yellow card) 72' | Report; Live video | Bilyeu 6' (Kendall-Moullin); Polster 37'; Christianson 40' (Volesky); Volesky 59' | Stadium: Ralph Korte Stadium; Attendance: 893; Referee: Douglas Wolff |

| 10/22/2014 | SIUE | 1–4 | Northern Illinois | DeKalb, Illinois |
| 7:00 pm CDT | Danzy 27' (Ledbetter); Ledbetter (yellow card) 38'; Kendall-Moullin (yellow card) 50' | Report; Live video | Hall 28'; Heinson 51' (Kannah); Heinson 61' (Ott & Palumbo); Witkowski 70' (Kannah & Garcia); Palumbo (yellow card) 71'; Raasch (yellow card) 79' | Stadium: NIU Soccer and Track & Field Complex; Attendance: 258; Referee: Cesar Ibarra |

| 10/28/2014 | SIUE | 0–0 ^{2ot} | #22 Louisville | Louisville, Kentucky |
| 6:30 pm CDT | | Report; Live video | | Stadium: Dr Mark and Cindy Lynn Stadium; Attendance: 2,625; Referee: Cory Richardson |

| 11/01/2014 | Missouri State * | 1–1^{2ot} | SIUE | Edwardsville, Illinois |
| 7:00 pm CDT | Hoegg (yellow card) 20'; Roberts 24' (Thomas); Team bench (yellow card) 100' | Report; Live video | Volesky 45' (Bilyeu); Polster (yellow card) 46' | Stadium: Ralph Korte Stadium; Attendance: 673; Referee: Shane Butler |

| 11/04/2014 | SIUE | 4–3 ^{2ot} | Eastern Illinois | Charleston, Illinois |
| pm CDT | Lane 23' (Volesky); Bauman (yellow card) 39'; Lane 50' (Bilyeu); Houguet 69' (Meredith); Bauman 101' (Scheipeter) | Report | Brillhart 16' (Recca & Butler); Bartuch (yellow card) 39'; Oliver 40' (Brillhart); Krogmann 85' (Butler & Medawattage); Butler (yellow card) 89' | Stadium: Lakeside Soccer Field; Attendance: 69; Referee: Art Arustamyan |

| 11/08/2014 | SIUE | 0–1 | Loyola * | Chicago, Illinois |
| 7:00 pm CDT | Hoguet (yellow card) 53' | Report; Live video | Bement 33' (Kraussel); Thomson (yellow card) 41'; Bement (yellow card) 73' | Stadium: Loyola Soccer Park; Attendance: 368; Referee: Karl Braun |

- * = Missouri Valley Conference opponent.

=== Post-season ===
2014 Missouri Valley Conference Men's Soccer Tournament

| 11/12/2014 Quarterfinal | Bye | v | Peoria, Illinois |
| 4:30 PM | | Live video | Stadium: Shea Stadium |

| 11/14/2014 Semifinals | _{(#6 seed)} Bradley | 1–2 | SIUE _{(#2 seed)} | Peoria, Illinois |
| 6:00 PM | Lofgren 22' (Lesch & Olsen) | Report; Live on ESPN3 | Bilyeu 79' (pen.); Danzy 85' (Kendall-Moulin) | Stadium: Shea Stadium; Attendance: 464; Referee: Terry Vaughn |

| 11/16/2014 Finals | _{(#2 seed)}SIUE | 1–0^{2ot} | Missouri State_{(#1 seed)} | Peoria, Illinois |
| 1:00 PM | Danzy 108' (Kendall-Moullin) | Report; Live on ESPN3 | | Stadium: Shea Stadium; Attendance: 344; Referee: Shane Butler |

2014 NCAA Division I Men's Soccer Championship

| 11/20/2014 First | SIUE | 1–0 | #17 Northwestern | Evanston, Illinois |
| 4:30 PM | Polster (yellow card) 73'; Scheipeter 81'; Danzy (yellow card) 85' | Report; Live video | Hopson (yellow card) 82' | Stadium: Lakeside Field; Attendance: 255; Referee: Dimitar Chavdarov |

| 11/23/2014 Second | SIUE | 0–1 | #18 California | Berkeley, California |
| 3:00 PM | Volesky (yellow card) 45' | Report | Sekine 71' (Bonomo); Sekine (yellow card) 78'; Jalali (yellow card) 84' | Stadium: Edwards Stadium; Attendance: 831; Referee: Daniel Radford; |

== Statistics ==
Field Players
| # | Name | Games | Starts | Goals | Assists | Points | Shots | Shot %age | Shots On Goal | OG %age | Penalty Kicks | Game Winners | Yellow cards | Red cards |
| 1 | Kent Kobernus | 19 | 19 | 0 | 0 | 0 | 0 | — | 0 | — | 0-0 | 0 | 2 | 0 |
| 2 | Andrew Kendall-Moullin | 19 | 17 | 0 | 3 | 3 | 17 | .000 | 6 | .353 | 0-0 | 0 | 4 | 0 |
| 3 | Justin Bilyeu | 21 | 19 | 2 | 3 | 7 | 13 | .154 | 4 | .308 | 1-1 | 1 | 0 | 0 |
| 4 | Matt Polster | 21 | 21 | 3 | 2 | 8 | 19 | .158 | 6 | .316 | 0-1 | 0 | 3 | 0 |
| 5 | Sean Baumann | 21 | 15 | 1 | 0 | 2 | 8 | .125 | 2 | .250 | 0-0 | 1 | 1 | 0 |
| 6 | Austin Ledbetter | 20 | 19 | 0 | 1 | 1 | 6 | .000 | 0 | .000 | 0-0 | 0 | 3 | 1 |
| 7 | Lewis Ellis | 21 | 11 | 1 | 1 | 3 | 17 | .059 | 7 | .412 | 0-0 | 0 | 1 | 0 |
| 9 | Jabari Danzy | 21 | 14 | 5 | 0 | 10 | 25 | .200 | 8 | .320 | 0-0 | 2 | 2 | 0 |
| 10 | Christian Volesky | 20 | 19 | 8 | 4 | 20 | 65 | .123 | 40 | .615 | 0-2 | 1 | 5 | 0 |
| 11 | Jason Hackett | 14 | 3 | 0 | 2 | 2 | 7 | .000 | 0 | .000 | 0-0 | 0 | 0 | 0 |
| 13 | Joel Duncan | 11 | 2 | 0 | 0 | 0 | 2 | .500 | 2 | 1.000 | 0-0 | 0 | 0 | 0 |
| 14 | Drew Merideth | 2 | 0 | 0 | 0 | 0 | 0 | — | 0 | — | 0-0 | 0 | 0 | 0 |
| 15 | Jacob Wieser | 19 | 17 | 0 | 0 | 0 | 3 | .000 | 2 | .667 | 0-0 | 0 | 2 | 0 |
| 16 | Garet Christianson | 14 | 14 | 3 | 2 | 8 | 23 | .130 | 13 | .565 | 1–1 | 2 | 1 | 0 |
| 17 | Paul Scheipeter | 21 | 18 | 1 | 2 | 4 | 23 | .043 | 9 | .391 | 0-0 | 1 | 0 | 0 |
| 18 | Devyn Jambga | 15 | 0 | 0 | 0 | 0 | 4 | .000 | 0 | .000 | 0-0 | 0 | 1 | 0 |
| 19 | Mitchell Williams | 2 | 0 | 0 | 0 | 0 | 0 | — | 0 | — | 0-0 | 0 | 0 | 0 |
| 20 | Travis Hoguet | 21 | 4 | 2 | 1 | 5 | 19 | .105 | 12 | .632 | 0-0 | 0 | 1 | 0 |
| 21 | Keegan McHugh | 1 | 1 | 0 | 0 | 0 | 0 | — | 0 | — | 0-0 | 0 | 0 | 0 |
| 22 | Brett Lane | 20 | 16 | 2 | 0 | 4 | 14 | .143 | 8 | .571 | 0-0 | 0 | 3 | 0 |
| 24 | Lance Ramsey | 3 | 0 | 0 | 0 | 0 | 0 | — | 0 | — | 0-0 | 0 | 0 | 0 |
| 30 | Kyle Dal Santo | 2 | 2 | 0 | 0 | 0 | 0 | — | 0 | — | 0-0 | 0 | 0 | 0 |
| | Totals | 21 | 21 | 28 | 23 | 79 | 267 | .105 | 120 | .449 | 2-5 | 8 | 30 | 1 |
| | Opponents | 21 | 21 | 25 | 24 | 74 | 196 | .128 | 92 | .469 | 1-2 | 8 | 25 | 1 |
Goalkeepers
| # | Name | Games | Starts | Minutes | Goals Against | GA Average | Saves | Save %age | Wins | Loses | Tie | Shutouts | Yellow Cards | Red Cards |
| 1 | Kent Kobernus | 19 | 19 | 1849:18 | 24 | 1.168 | 54 | .692 | 7 | 8 | 4 | 5 | 2 | 0 |
| 30 | Kyle Dal Santo | 2 | 2 | 180:00 | 1 | 0.500 | 14 | .933 | 1 | 1 | 0 | 1 | 0 | 0 |
| | Totals | 21 | 21 | 2029:18 | 25 | 1.109 | 68 | .731 | 8 | 9 | 4 | 5 | 2 | 0 |
| | Opponents | 21 | 21 | 2029:18 | 28 | 1.242 | 86 | .754 | 9 | 8 | 4 | 4 | 0 | 0 |

| Additional stats | Corner kicks | Offsides | Fouls | Goals/game |
|---|---|---|---|---|
| SIUE | 91 | 25 | 238 | 1.333 |
| Opponents | 69 | 80 | 297 | 1.190 |

== See also ==
- 2014 Missouri Valley Conference men's soccer season
- Missouri Valley Conference men's soccer tournament
