= 2014 Missouri Valley Conference men's soccer tournament =

2014 MVC Men's Soccer Tournament
Tournament details
- Country: United States
- Teams: 6

Final positions
- Champions: SIUE
- Runners-up: Missouri State

Tournament statistics
- Matches played: 5
- Goals scored: 11 (2.2 per match)
- Top goal scorer: Jabari Danzy–SIUE (2)

Awards
- Best player: Jabari Danzy–SIUE

The 2014 Missouri Valley Conference Men's Soccer Tournament was the 24th edition of the tournament. It determined the Missouri Valley Conference's (MVC) automatic berth in the 2014 NCAA Division I Men's Soccer Championship. Bradley University hosted the tournament at Shea Stadium, which is located about 1 mile (1.6 kilometers) from the Bradley campus in Peoria, Illinois.

The second-seeded SIUE Cougars won the tournament, besting the top-seeded Missouri State Bears in the championship match. It was SIUE's first MVC championship.

== Qualification ==
2014 Missouri Valley Conference men's soccer standings
	Conf.					Overall
Team	W		L		T	W		L		T
Missouri State	4	–	0	–	2	9	–	5	–	4
SIU Edwardsville ‡	4	–	1	–	1	8	–	9	–	4
Evansville	4	–	2	–	0	6	–	11	–	1
Drake	3	–	3	–	0	5	–	11	–	3
Loyola Chicago	2	–	2	–	2	8	–	6	–	5
Bradley	1	–	5	–	0	9	–	11	–	0
Central Arkansas	0	–	5	–	1	2	–	13	–	1
‡ - MVC Tournament champion + - Invited to the NCAA Division I Men's Soccer Championship; As of November 23, 2014; Rankings from NSCAA

The top six teams in the Missouri Valley Conference based on their conference regular season records qualified for the tournament. The Missouri State Bears, SIUE Cougars, Evansville Purple Aces, Drake Bulldogs, Loyola Chicago Ramblers, and Bradley Braves earned berths in the tournament. Top-seeded Missouri State and second-seeded SIUE received first round byes.

== Bracket ==
Quarterfinals
4	Drake	1
5	Loyola	3
6	Bradley	1
3	Evansville	0

Semifinals
1	Missouri State	2
4	Loyola	0
2	SIUE	2
3	Bradley	1

Final
1	Missouri State	0
3	SIUE — 2OT	1

== Schedule ==
November 12, 2014 Quarterfinals	#5 Loyola	3–1	#4 Drake	Peoria, Illinois
3:00 PM	Collier 20' A-Kraussel; Cappuccitti 33' A-Kraussel; Own goal 83'	Report	Enna 4' A-Wypych	Stadium: Shea Stadium; Attendance: 331; Referee: Karl Braun; Assistant referees: Brian Lynch & Jose Jimenez; Fourth official: Cory Formea

November 12, 2014 Quarterfinals	#6 Bradley	1–0	#3 Evansville	Peoria, Illinois
6:00 PM	Emerson (yellow card) 1'; Lesch 11' A-Olson & Okeke; Morales (yellow card) 67'	Report	Morales (yellow card) 77'; Gonzalez (yellow card) 77'; McGrath (yellow card) 85'	Stadium: Shea Stadium; Attendance: 331; Referee: David Jaworski; Assistant referees: Kyle Trimble & Cory Formea; Fourth official: Jose Jimenez

November 14, 2014 Semifinals	#5 Loyola	0–2	#1 Missouri State	Peoria, Illinois
3:00 PM	Roberts (yellow card) 81'	Report	Hoegg 28' A-Turner & Oslica; Griffin (yellow card) 81'; Roberts 84' A-Hoegg & Barbero	Stadium: Shea Stadium; Attendance: 115; Referee: Benjamin Trevino; Assistant referees: Doug Ferguson & George Major; Fourth official: Mike Dutt

November 14, 2014 Semifinals	#6 Bradley	1–2	#2 SIUE	Peoria, Illinois
6:00 PM	Lofgren 22' A-Lesch & Olson	Report	Bilyeu 78' Penalty kick Danzy 85' A-Kendall-Moullin	Stadium: Shea Stadium; Attendance: 464; Referee: Terry Vaughn; Assistant referees: Tyler Turner & Mike Dutt; Fourth official: George Major

November 16, 2014 MVC Final	#2 SIUE	1–0 (a.e.t.)	#1 Missouri State	Peoria, Illinois
1:00 PM	Danzy 108' A-Kendall-Moullin	Report		Stadium: Shea Stadium; Attendance: 344; Referee: Shane Butler; Assistant referees: Leszek Skowyra & Tim Boul; Fourth official: Chad Formea

== Statistical leaders ==
=== Top goalscorers ===
Rank	Player	College	Goals
1	(United States) Jabari Danzy	SIUE	2
2	(United States) Steven Enna	Drake	1
2	(New Zealand) Elliot Collier	Loyola	1
2	(United States) John Cappuccitti	Loyola	1
2	(United States) Jason Lesch	Bradkey	1
2	(United States) Emmerich Hoegg	Missouri State	1
2	(England) Jack Roberts	Missouri State	1
2	(United States) Cody Lofgren	Bradley	1
2	(United States) Justin Bilyeu	SIUE	1

=== Top goalkeepers ===
Rank	Player	College	Games	Saves	Save %age	Goals against average
1	(United States) Kent Kobernus	SIUE	2	10	.909	0.4545
2	(United States) Addison Watson	Missouri State	2	6	.857	0.4545

== All-tournament team ==
2014 Missouri Valley Conference Men's Soccer Tournament MVP— Jabari Danzy, SIUE

Note: Flags indicate national team as defined under FIFA eligibility rules; some limited exceptions apply. Players may hold more than one non-FIFA nationality.

No.	Pos.	Nation	Player
—	FW	USA	Brian Bement (Loyola)
—	DF	USA	Justin Bilyeu (SIUE)
—	MF	USA	Andrew Brown (Bradley)
—	MF	USA	Jabari Danzy (SIUE)
—	DF	ENG	James Fawke (Missouri State)
—	DF	USA	Patrick Hodges (Evansville)
—	GK	USA	Kent Kobernus (SIUE)
—	FW	USA	Cody Lofgren (Bradley)
—	DF	USA	Brian Lunar (Loyola)
—	DF	USA	Parker Maher (Missouri State)
—	DF	USA	Matt Polster (SIUE)
—	MF	USA	Alex Troester (Drake)
—	DF	ENG	Andrew Turner (Missouri State)

== See also ==
- Missouri Valley Conference
- 2014 Missouri Valley Conference men's soccer season
- 2014 NCAA Division I men's soccer season
- 2014 NCAA Division I Men's Soccer Championship
