= Fadzayi Mahere =

Zimbabwean lawyer and politician

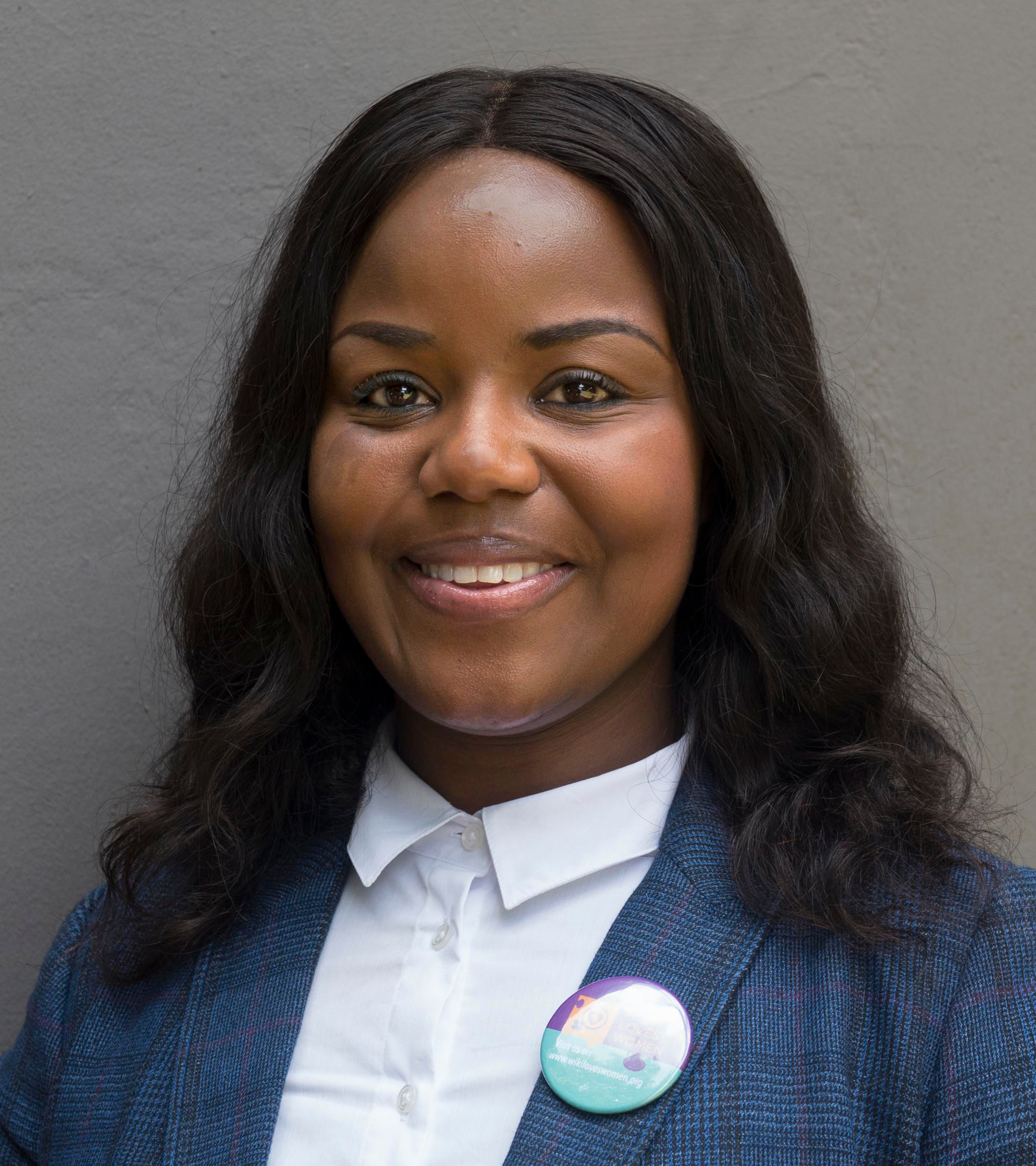
- Born: 30 July 1985 (age 41)
- Education: University of Zimbabwe (LLB); University of Cambridge (LLM)
- Occupations: Lawyer and politician
- Political party: Citizens Coalition For Change (2022–2023); Movement for Democratic Change (2016–2021)
- Website: fadzayimahere.wordpress.com

Fadzayi Mahere (born 30 July 1985) is a Zimbabwean lawyer and politician who quit as Member of Parliament for Mount Pleasant Constituency in Harare. She was the National Spokesperson for the Citizens Coalition for Change, a political party in Zimbabwe between 2022 and 2023. After a career in legal advocacy, she emerged around April 2016 first as an independent parliamentary candidate, and participated in the 2018 elections. However, in 2019 she joined MDC Alliance and subsequently won the Mount Pleasant in the 2023 harmonised elections before quitting on 26 January 2024. During the 2016–2017 Zimbabwe protests, she was arrested several times.

== Early life and education ==
Fadzayi Mahere grew up in Mount Pleasant, Harare, and attended Arundel School.

She enrolled in 2004 at the University of Zimbabwe, where she obtained a Bachelor of Law Honours degree (LLB Hons) in 2008. In 2010 she enrolled at the University of Cambridge for a Master of Laws degree in International Criminal Law & International Commercial Litigation, graduating in 2011.

== Career ==
In June 2016, Advocate Mahere participated in the Reserve Bank of Zimbabwe public inquisition on the printing and introduction of additional bond notes 2016. At the event, Mahere highlighted that the bond notes were unconstitutional, according to Chapter 17 of the Constitution, on public finance.

Also in 2016, as part of the activist movement #thisflagmovement, she began motivating and mobilising people, using mainly social media channels such as Facebook Live and Twitter to rise against the government.

In 2017 she announced her bid to represent the Harare suburb of Mount Pleasant in the 2018 elections as an independent candidate. She was arrested in 2017 after organising a soccer tournament in her constituency and was charged under the Public Order and Security Act (POSA).

In June 2019 she officially joined the party Movement for Democratic Change (MDC) as the Secretary for Education. In May 2020 she was announced as the National Spokesperson for the MDC Alliance coalition.

== Notable achievements ==
Mahere was part of the Lead Counsel (Zimbabwe) team that won the All Africa International Humanitarian Law Moot Court Competition in Arusha, Tanzania, in 2007 and was awarded Best Oral Argument in the Finals.
