= St. John's High School (Harare) =

- St. John's High School Logo

Location
- 28 Dublin Road, Emerald Hill; Harare, Zimbabwe; 17.772716°S 31.0256624°E

Information
- Type: Private high school
- Motto: Veritas (Truth)
- Denomination: Catholic, Dominican sisters
- Established: 1925
- Gender: Co-educational
- Website: StJohnsEmerald

St. John's High School is a Catholic, independent, co-educational, day high school located in the suburb of Emerald Hill in Harare, Zimbabwe. It provides secondary education and A-levels.

== History ==
Three Dominican religious sisters opened the school in 1925 in a few sheds, to cater to the underprivileged children in the capital city. In 1939 a large building was constructed. In 1996 it ceased to be a boarding school and A-levels were added. After 2003 the A-levels followed the Zimbabwe ZIMSEC curriculum. A-levels are offered in Arts, Commercials, and Sciences.

== Program ==
As a Catholic school, its curriculum includes religious studies and some of its teachers remain sisters from the nearby convent.

Several St John's High School students and alumni have represented the junior provincial and national teams in sports such as hockey, basketball, swimming, and cricket, and internationally in Chess and Quiz.

== See also ==
List of schools in Zimbabwe
