= Mount Pleasant School, Harare =

Coordinates: 17.7800°S 31.0453°E

Mt Pleasant High School
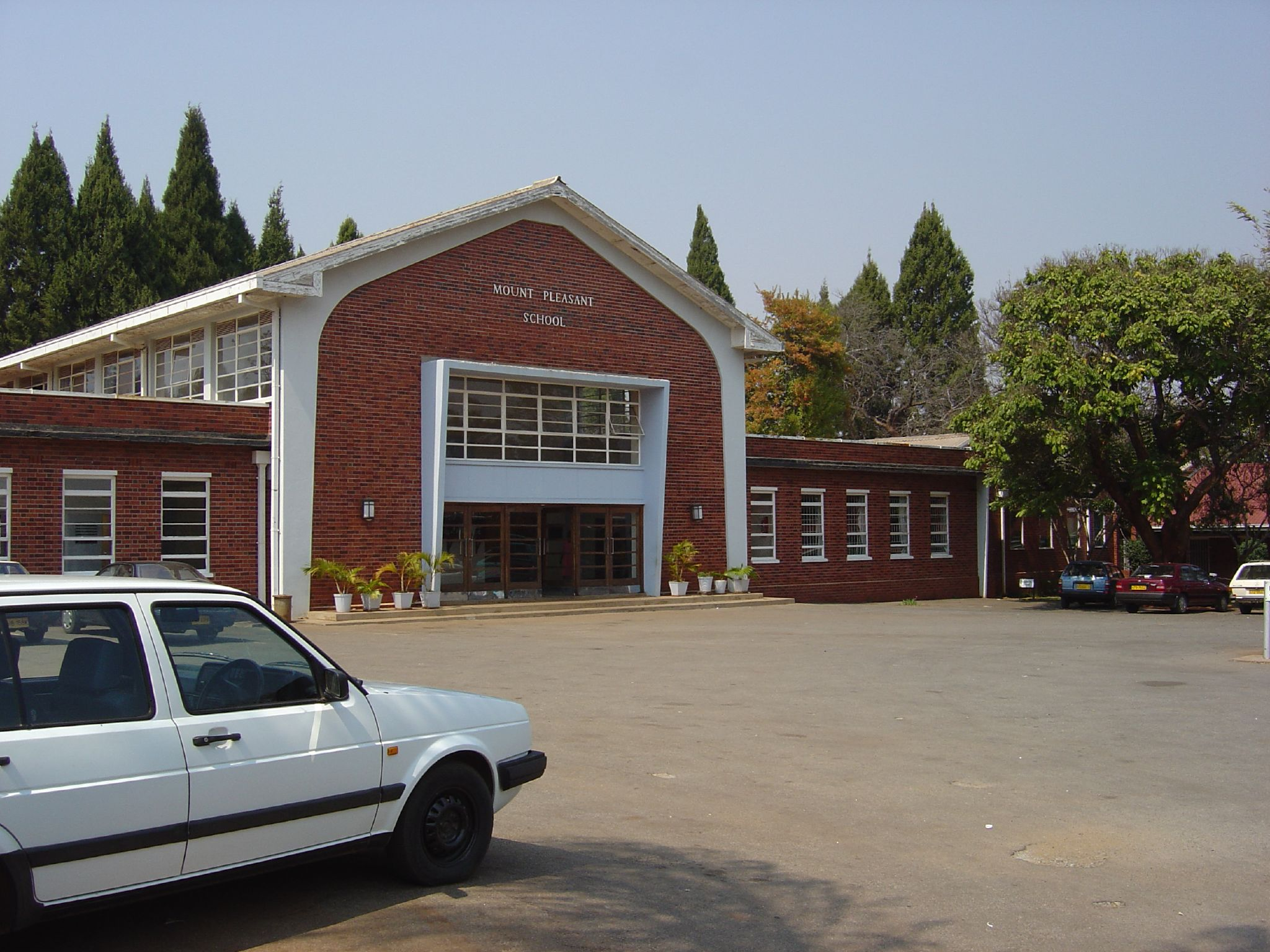
- Mount Pleasant; Harare, Harare Province; Zimbabwe

Information
- Other name: Joshua Nkomo High School
- School type: Secondary school
- Motto: "A man of understanding walks upright" – Proverbs 15:21
- Alumni: Old Impalians
- Website: www.mtpleasanthigh.ac.zw

Mount Pleasant School is located in the suburb of Mount Pleasant, Harare, Zimbabwe.

The school came into being on 1 January 1957 as Mt. Pleasant Boys’ High school. In 1969 the first girls were enrolled and it became a co-educational institution know simply as Mt Pleasant High School. The school has since been making great strides over the years to improve the education of its learners and even more recently through its recently established digital learning program for pupils and teachers.

The school motto "... a man of understanding walks upright" comes from Proverbs 15:21. The school emblem is the impala, hence the designation Old Impalian for old boys and old girls.

Mount Pleasant School was ranked 58th out of the top 100 best high schools in Africa by Africa Almanac in 2003, based upon quality of education, student engagement, strength and activities of alumni, school profile, internet and news visibility.
