= Sebastien Summerfield =

Zimbabwean footballer (born 2002)

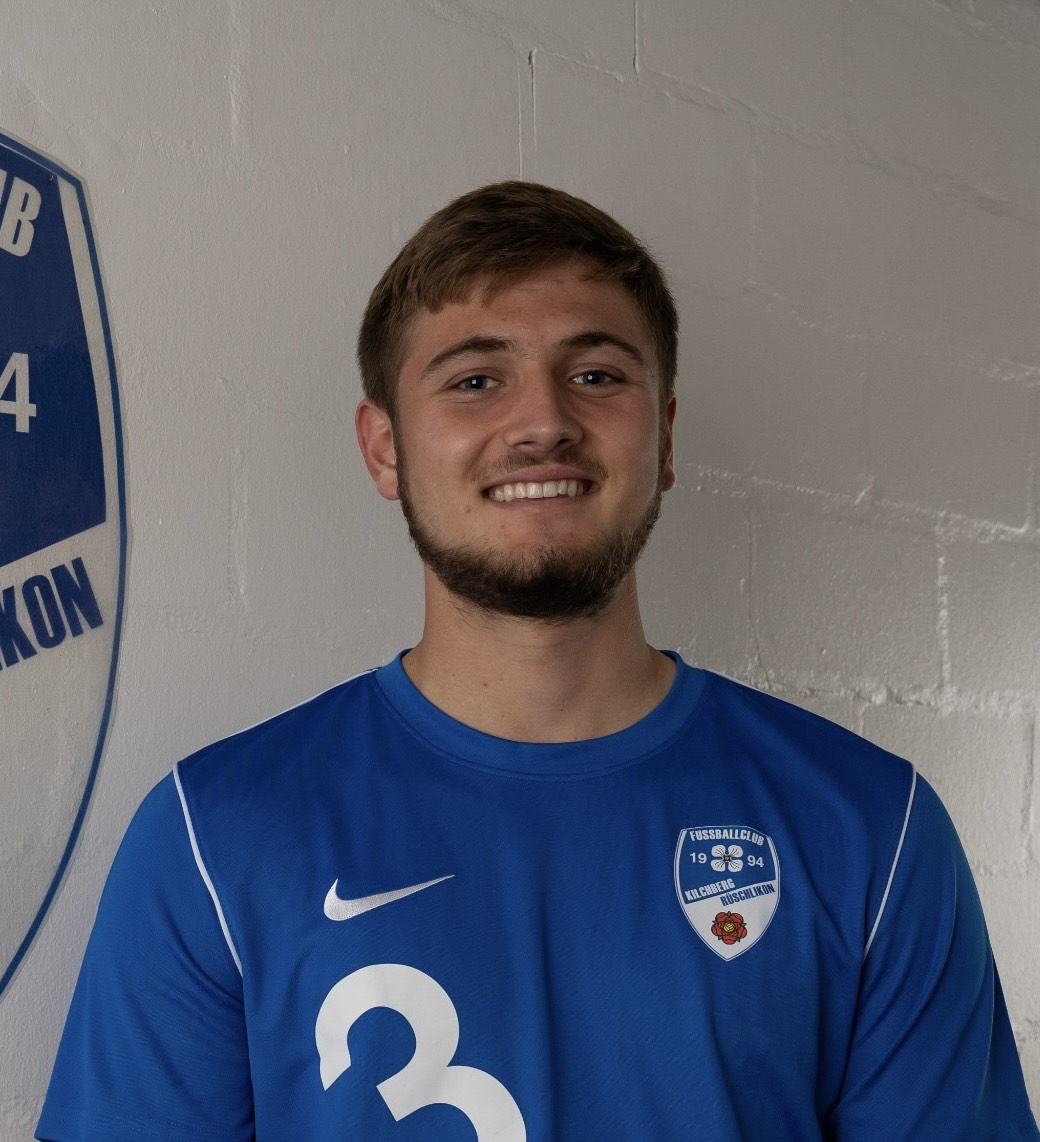
- Sebastien Summerfield with FC Kilchberg

Personal information
- Date of birth: 11 February 2002 (age 24)
- Place of birth: Harare, Zimbabwe
- Height: 1.78 m (5 ft 10 in)
- Positions: Midfielder; wingback

Team information
- Current team: FC Kilchberg
- Number: 13

Youth career
- 2012–2019: Legends Academy
- 2019–2021: Gateshead

Senior career*
Years	Team	Apps	(Gls)
2019–2021	Newcastle Blue Star	13	(7)
2021–	FC Kilchberg	45	(10)

International career
2020–	Zimbabwe U20	1	
- * Club domestic league appearances and goals

Sebastien Summerfield (born 11 February 2002) is a Zimbabwean footballer who currently plays as a midfielder for FC Kilchberg in Zürich, Switzerland as well as the founder of the SRS Foundation, which empowers grassroots footballers in Zimbabwe.

== Early life and education ==
Summerfield was born and raised in the Newlands suburb of Harare. He was schooled in his home country Zimbabwe. He began playing football at a very early age and started playing academy football at Celebration Centre aged 6. He attended Harare International School till 2020. While there, Summerfield was coached by former Zimbabwe Warriors Player, Alan Johnson.

== International career ==
At age 17, Summerfield was scouted by former Bafana Bafana player and Newcastle FC midfielder; Matty Pattison to join Gateshead F.C., located in Gateshead, a location across the river from Newcastle upon Tyne (in the United Kingdom). Summerfield moved to Newcastle in 2019. While at Gateshead, Summerfield caught the eye of Zimbabwe U-20 National team Coach Tonderai Ndiraya. who selected him to represent Zimbabwe at the 2020 COSAFA Tournament held in Nelson Mandela Bay. Whilst at COSAFA, Summerfield was handpicked by FC Kilchberg in Zürich, Switzerland. Summerfield made his Swiss debut in October 2021.

== Zimbabwe's FIFA Ban ==
Early in 2023, Summerfield added his voice to the growing outcry by prominent players such as Bill Antonio and Tino Kadewere over Zimbabwe's indefinite suspension on the international playing field since February 2022 citing the bans' stunting of young Zimbabwean talent.

== Philanthropic work ==
Summerfield has hosted a series of Under-16 scouting tournaments in the low income areas of Harare, Zimbabwe where he has helped scout talent from low income areas. The grassroots football project has held tournaments in Dzivarasekwa, Mabvuku and Mbare. Summerfield is the founder of the SRS foundation Zimbabwe. A grassroots football foundation which empowers footballers through education and professional opportunities in the football world. Summerfield has also been appointed as Sporting Director of Bulawayo based Football team, Ajax Hotspur FC.

== Career statistics ==
Club	Season	League				National			
Club	Season	Division	Apps	Goals	Assists	Division	Apps	Goals	Assists
Zimbabwe National Team	November–December 2020					COSAFA U-20 National Tournament			
FC Kilchberg-Ruschilkon	2021–23		45	10	15				
Gateshead	2020–21	U-20	3	0	2				
Newcastle Blue Star	2020–21		13	7	7				
Dynamos FC	2020, 2021, 2022	Zimbabwe Premier League							
FC Winterthur		U-21 Pre-Season Training							
FC Schaffhausen		U-21 Pre-Season Training							
FC Thalwil		U-21 Pre-Season Training							
