= Mount Pleasant (constituency) =

Constituency of the Parliament of Zimbabwe

- National Assembly constituency for the Parliament of Zimbabwe
- District: Harare
- Province: Harare
- Electorate: 39,427 (2023)
- Major settlements: Mount Pleasant

Current constituency
- Created: 1970–1987; recreated 2008
- Number of members: 1
- Party: ZANU-PF
- Member: George Mashavave

Mount Pleasant is a constituency represented in the National Assembly of the Parliament of Zimbabwe, located in the Mount Pleasant suburb of Harare. Previously a white constituency in the Parliament of Rhodesia, it was abolished in 1987 along with the other white-reserved seats in Parliament. It was recreated for the 2008 election and is currently represented by George Mashavave of the ZANU-PF party since April 27, 2024 when Mashavave won the seat in a by-election, after the previous MP, Fadzayi Mahere of the Citizens Coalition for Change (CCC) party, resigned from Parliament in January 2024.

== Members ==
Election	Name	Party
1970	Jack Howman	Rhodesian Front
1974	Chris Andersen	Rhodesian Front
1977	Chris Andersen	Rhodesian Front
1979	Chris Andersen	Rhodesian Front
1980	Chris Andersen	Rhodesian Front
1985	Chris Andersen	Independent
Constituency abolished 1987–2008
2008	Jameson Timba	MDC–T
2013	Jaison Passade	ZANU–PF
2018	Samuel Banda	MDC Alliance
2023	Fadzayi Mahere	CCC
2024	George Mashavave	ZANU–PF

== See also ==
- List of Zimbabwean parliamentary constituencies
