= Arrupe Jesuit University =

Higher education institution in Harare, Zimbabwe

Arrupe Jesuit University, Harare
- Former names: Arrupe College Jesuit School of Philosophy and Humanities (1994–2017)
- Motto in English: "Ever to Love and to Serve"
- Type: Private Catholic Research Non-profit Coeducational Higher education institution
- Established: 1994; 32 years ago
- Religious affiliation: Roman Catholic (Jesuit)
- Academic affiliations: IAJU
- Chancellor: Fr. José Minaku Lukoli S.J
- Vice-Chancellor: Fr. Evaristus Ekwueme, SJ
- Dean: Fr. Evaristus Ekwueme, SJ
- Academic staff: 34
- Administrative staff: 26
- Students: 130
- Location: 16 Link Road, Mount Pleasant, Harare, Zimbabwe; 17°46′36.27″S 31°3′28.91″E
- Campus: Suburban
- Language: English
- Website: aju.ac.zw

Arrupe Jesuit University also referred to by its acronym AJU is a fully accredited private, Catholic. international and multicultural higher education institution run by the Zimbabwe-Mozambique Province of the Society of Jesus in Harare, Zimbabwe. It was founded by the Jesuits in 1994. The Zimbabwe Council for Higher Education (ZIMCHE), under the Ministry of Higher and Tertiary Education, Science, Technology and Development, granted provisional accreditation on December 7, 2017. On February 24, 2018, the President of the Jesuit Conference of Africa and Madagascar (JCAM), Fr. A. E Orobator, SJ, inaugurated the new university. On December 3, 2018, ZIMCHE granted full accreditation. When founded in 1994, Arrupe Jesuit University was called Arrupe College Jesuit School of Philosophy and Humanities. It is owned in trust by the Jesuits of Zimbabwe and Mozambique for (JCAM).

AJU is named for Father Pedro Arrupe, the 28th Superior General of the Jesuits, who was known for social and economic justice. AJU is a member of the International Association of Jesuit Universities (IAJU) which comprises about 300 universities worldwide. The School of Philosophy and Humanities shares associate status with the University of Zimbabwe, and the Pontifical Gregorian University, Rome. Today, Arrupe is open to all students from all walks of life.

== Programs ==
As of 2019, Arrupe Jesuit University had three major schools or faculties: the School of Philosophy and Humanities, the School of Engineering and ICT, and the School of Education and Leadership. It offers four major degree programs: Bachelor of Arts in Philosophy, Bachelor of Arts in Transformational Leadership, and Bachelor of Science in ICT. In addition, it offers numerous diploma courses, including project management, development studies, guidance and counseling, learning differences, Cisco certifications, web development, and Android application development. The Language Department offers Shona, French, English, German, Portuguese, and Italian.

== See also ==
- List of Jesuit sites
