= Gateway High School (Zimbabwe) =

Independent high school in Harare, Zimbabwe

Gateway

Location
- Golden Stairs Road, Emerald Hill; Harare; Zimbabwe
- Coordinates: 17.7606°S 31.0287°E

Information
- Type: Independent, day high school
- Religious affiliation: Christianity
- Denomination: Evangelical
- Established: 1999
- Headmaster: Tunga Mashungu
- Forms: 1-4, Sixth Form
- Gender: Co-educational
- Enrollment: 590 (2016)
- Campus type: Suburban
- Feeder schools: Gateway Primary School
- Affiliations: ATS; CHISZ
- Website: www.gatewayhigh.co.zw

Gateway High School is a Christian, co-educational, independent school in Emerald Hill, Harare, Zimbabwe. It has 700 students from Form 1 to Upper 6. The school had its first form 1 intake in 1991 and the first upper 6 class graduated in 1995 under the headship of Paul Revell, along with Marcus Chibisa and Ron Montague as his deputies. The school is located on Sam Nujoma Street (previously Golden Stairs Road and Second Street Extension).

Gateway High School is a member of the Association of Trust Schools (ATS) and the Headmaster is a member of the Conference of Heads of Independent Schools in Zimbabwe (CHISZ). The school prepares students for the Cambridge IGCSE and A-Level examinations.

Gateway High School was named in 2003 in the top twenty best high schools in Africa, based upon quality of education, student engagement, strength and activities of old boys and old girls, school profile, internet and news visibility. Gateway was also ranked as one of the Top 10 High Schools in Zimbabwe in 2014.

== Images ==
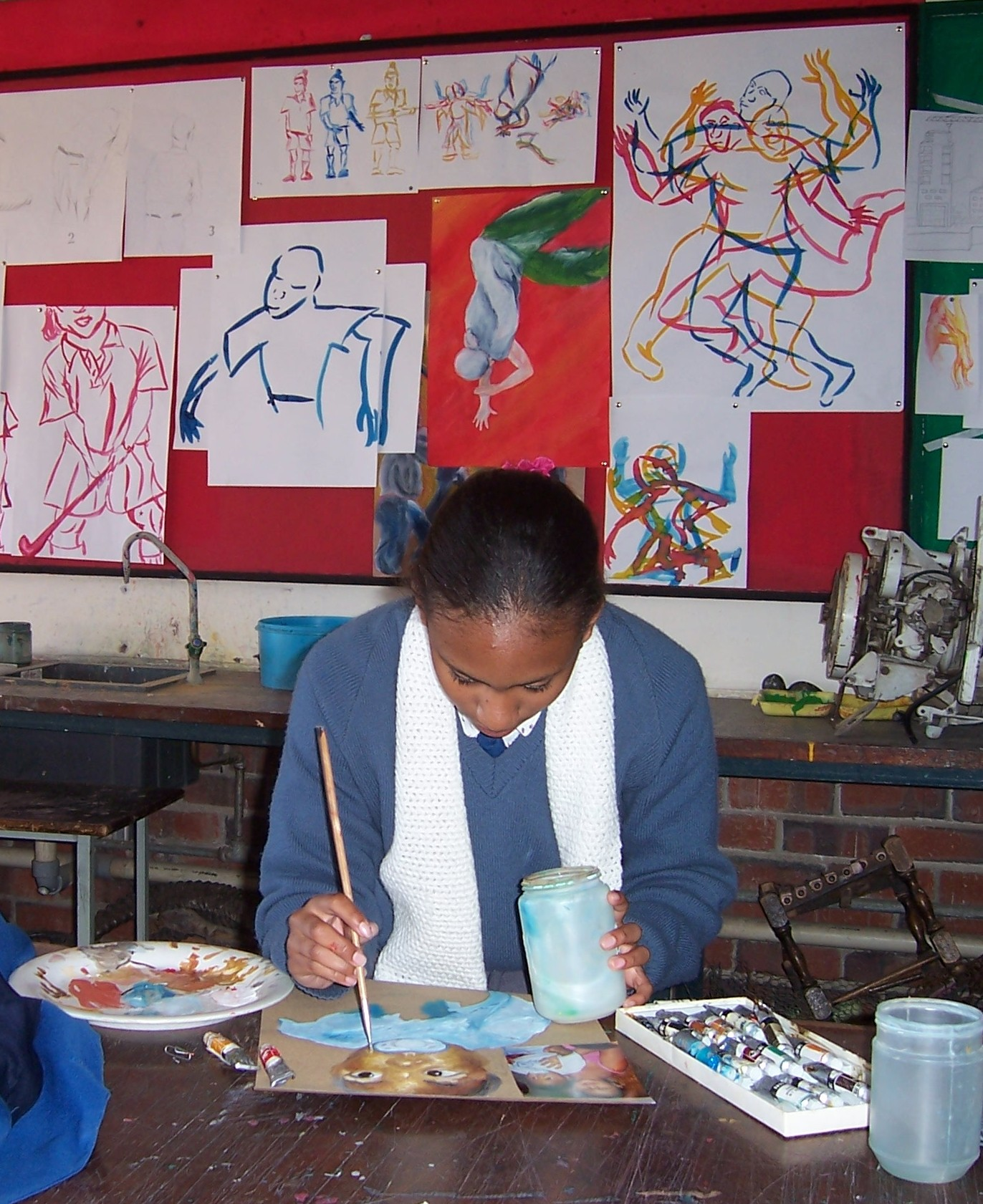
Gateway High School Art Class

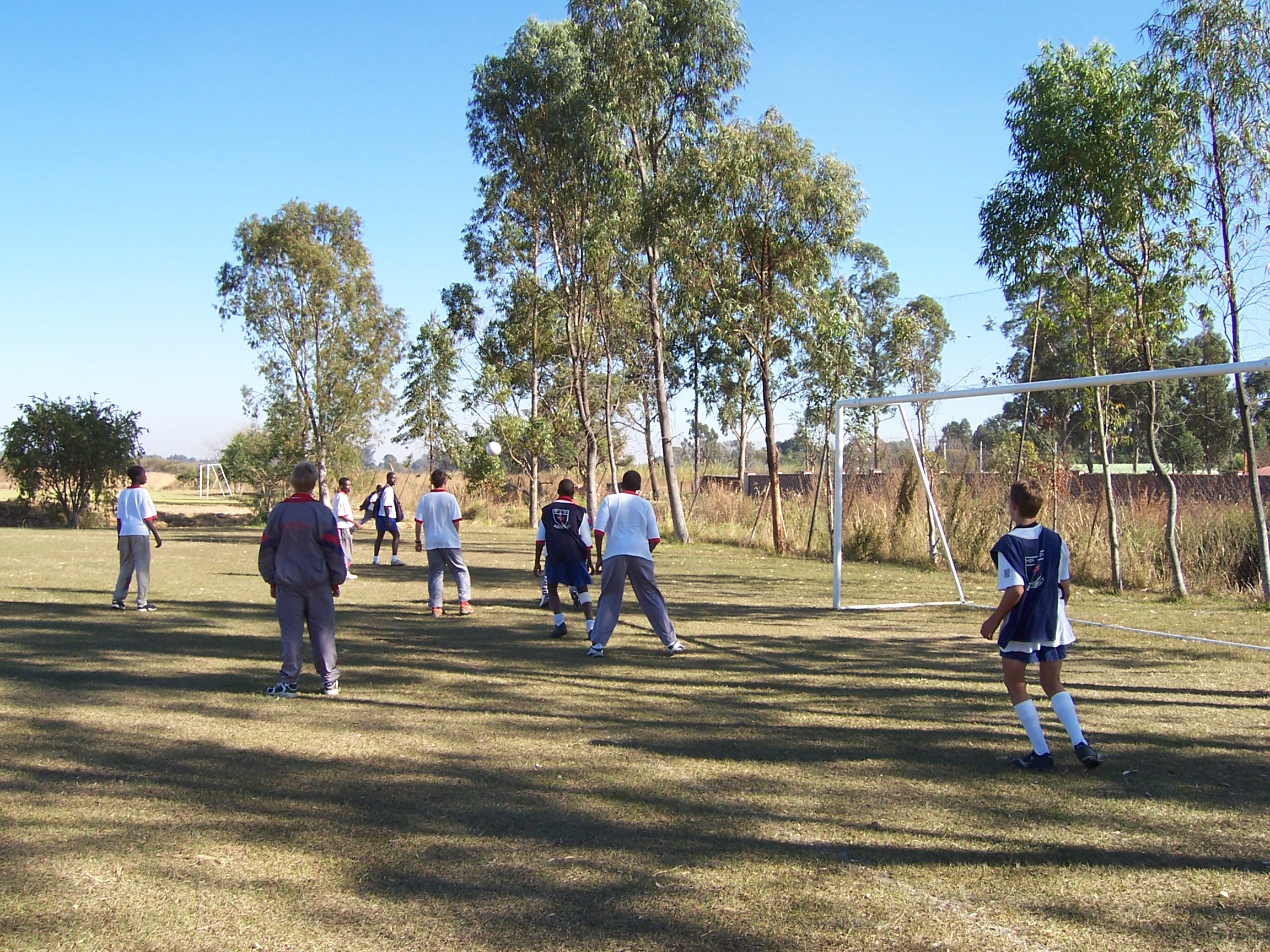
Gateway High School PE

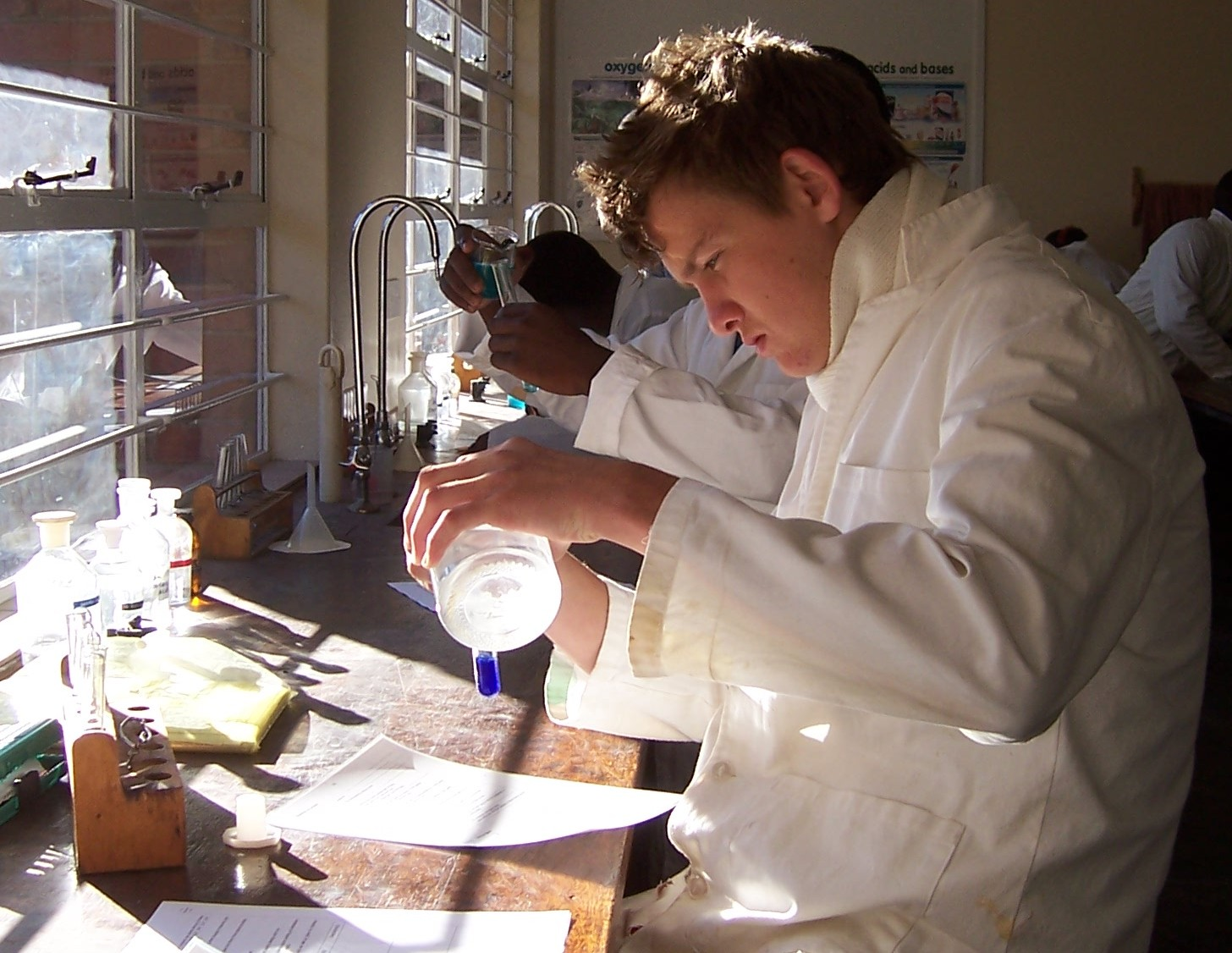
Gateway High School Pupils doing a chemistry practical

Gateway High School Library

== See also ==
- List of schools in Zimbabwe
- Education in Zimbabwe
