= 2014 Missouri Valley Conference men's soccer season =

Missouri Valley Conference
- Season: 2014
- Champions: Missouri State
- MVC Tourney Winner: SIUE
- To NCAA Tournament: SIUE
- Matches: 132
- Goals: 148 (1.12 per match)
- Top goalscorer: 20 points Christian Volesky; SIUE 8 G, 4 A
- Biggest home win: Evansville 5-0 Belmont (September 5)
- Biggest away win: Drake 1-4 Evansville (October 25)
- Highest scoring: Bradley 3–4 UNLV; San Diego 5–2 Bradley; SMU 7–0 UCA; EIU 3–4 SIUE
- Longest winning run: 4 – SIUE
- Longest unbeaten run: 5 – Loyola
- Longest winless run: 13 – UCA
- Longest losing run: 11 – UCA
- Highest attendance: H–4665 Bradley @ SIUE; A–5487 UCA @ St. Louis; N– 257 Bradley vs Mercer @ Loyola
- Lowest attendance: H–152 Oral Roberts @ UCA; A–69 SIUE @ EIU (sleeting); N–54 –Missouri St. vs Memphis @ SMU
- Total attendance: 87,004
- Average attendance: 659.121
- All statistics correct as of November 26, 2014.

The 2014 Missouri Valley Conference men's soccer season was the 24th season of men's varsity soccer in the conference. The defending regular season champion was Missouri State, and the defending postseason champion was Bradley.

Missouri State won the regular season championship .

The Missouri Valley Conference men's soccer tournament was hosted by Bradley on November 12, 14, and 16. SIUE won the tourney title and the automatic bid to the 2014 NCAA Division I Men's Soccer Championship with a 1–0 victory over Missouri State in the second extra time period.

In the NCAA Tournament, the SIUE Cougars defeated Northwestern 1–0 in Evanston before falling in the second round to #15 seed California 0–1 in Berkeley.

== Changes from 2013 ==
- None

== Teams ==
2014 Missouri Valley Conference men's soccer standings
	Conf.					Overall
Team	W		L		T	W		L		T
Missouri State	4	–	0	–	2	9	–	5	–	4
SIU Edwardsville ‡	4	–	1	–	1	8	–	9	–	4
Evansville	4	–	2	–	0	6	–	11	–	1
Drake	3	–	3	–	0	5	–	11	–	3
Loyola Chicago	2	–	2	–	2	8	–	6	–	5
Bradley	1	–	5	–	0	9	–	11	–	0
Central Arkansas	0	–	5	–	1	2	–	13	–	1
‡ - MVC Tournament champion + - Invited to the NCAA Division I Men's Soccer Championship; As of November 23, 2014; Rankings from NSCAA

Team	Location	Stadium	Capacity	Head coach	Uniform supplier
Bradley Braves	Peoria, Illinois	Shea Stadium	3,800	(United States) Jim DeRose	(Germany) adidas
Central Arkansas Bears	Conway, Arkansas	Bill Stephens Track/Soccer Complex	300	(United States) Ross Duncan	(Germany) adidas
Drake Bulldogs	Des Moines, Iowa	Cownie Sports Complex	2,000	(Switzerland) (Canada) Sean Holmes	(Germany) adidas
Evansville Purple Aces	Evansville, Indiana	McCutchan Stadium	2,500	(United States) Mike Jacobs	(Germany) adidas
Loyola Ramblers	Chicago, Illinois	Loyola Soccer Park	500	(New Zealand) Neil Jones	(United States) Nike
Missouri State Bears	Springfield, Missouri	Plaster Sports Complex	16,600	(United States) John Leamy	(Germany) adidas
SIU Edwardsville Cougars	Edwardsville, Illinois	Korte Stadium	4,000	(United States) Brian Jones (United States) David Korn	(Germany) adidas

== Season outlook ==
2014 Preseason Coaches' Poll

Rank	Team (1st-place votes)	Points
1	Missouri State (4)	46
2	Evansville (2)	37
3	Bradley (1)	34
4	Drake	31
5	SIUE	23
6	Loyola	16
7	Central Arkansas	9

2014 Preseason MVC All-Conference Team

Player	School	Position	Class	Hometown (High school)
Alec Bartlett	Drake	Defender	Junior	Overland Park, KS (St. James Academy)
Brian Bement	Loyola	Forward/Midfield	Senior	Waterloo, IL (Saint Louis University High)
James Fawke	Missouri State	Defender	Senior	Cheltenham, England (Bournside School)
Mark Gonzalez	Evansville	Midfield	Junior	Toronto, Ontario, Canada (Robert F. Hall Catholic)
Faik Hajderovic	Evansville	Forward	Junior	St. Louis, MO (Mehlville)
Darrin MacLeod	Drake	Goalkeeper	Sophomore	Waterloo, Ontario, Canada (Resurrection Catholic)
Logan Miller	Central Arkansas	Midfield	Senior	Tomball, TX (Tomball High.)
Christian Okeke	Bradley	Forward	Sophomore	Wichita Falls, TX (Rider H.S.)
Matt Polster	SIUE	Midfield	Senior	Las Vegas, NV (Palo Verde)
Jack Roberts	Missouri State	Midfield	Senior	Leicester, England (John Cleveland College)
Matt Taphorn	Central Arkansas	Defender	Senior	Denver, CO. (Rangeview)
Christian Volesky	SIUE	Forward	Senior	Henderson, NV (Foothill)

== MVC Tournament ==
Quarterfinals; Wednesday, November 12
4	Drake	1
5	Loyola	3
3	Evansville	0
6	Bradley	1

Semifinals; Friday, November 14
1	Missouri State	2
5	Loyola	0
6	Bradley	1
2	SIUE	2

Final; Sunday, November 16
1	Missouri State	0
2	SIUE	1 (2OT)

== Honors ==
=== 2014 NSCAA Men's University Division Scholar All-America Teams ===
First Team— Defender Matt Polster, SIUE, 3.46 Business Administration, Las Vegas, NV

Second Team— Defender James Fawke, Missouri State, 3.45 Administrative Management, Cheltenham, England

=== 2014 NSCAA/Continental Tire NCAA Division I Men's All-West Region Teams ===
First Team— Defender Matt Polster, SIUE; Midfielder Christian Volesky, SIUE

Second Team— Defender James Fawke, Missouri State; Defender Eric Schoendorf, Loyola; Forward Mark Anthony Gonzalez, Evansville

Third Team— Goalkeeper Tim Dobrowolski, Loyola; Defender Parker Maher, Missouri State; Forward Cody Lofgren, Bradley; Forward Christian Okeke, Bradley

=== 2014 MVC awards ===
2014 MVC Player of the Year — Christian Volesky, SIUE

2014 MVC Defensive Player of the Year — Matt Polster, SIUE

2014 MVC Goalkeeper of the Year — Tim Dobrowolski, Loyola

2014 MVC Freshman of the Year — Kyle Thomson, Loyola

2014 MVC Coaching Staff of the Year — Loyola (Neil Jones, Nate Boyden, Brian Plotkin, Jeremy Proud)

2014 MVC Fair Play Award— Evansville

=== 2014 MVC All-Conference First Team ===
Player	School	Position	Class	Hometown (High school/Previous college)
Tim Dobrowolski	Loyola	Goalkeeper	Junior	Rockford, Illinois (Boylan Catholic)
Mark Anthony Gonzalez	Evansville	Forward	Junior	Toronto, Ontario, Canada (Robert F. Hall Catholic)
Emmerich Heogg	Missouri State	Midfielder	Junior	Crestview, Florida (Choctawhatchee)
Faik Hajderovic	Evansville	Midfielder	Junior	St. Louis, Missouri (Mehlville)
Christian Volesky	SIUE	Midfielder	Senior	Henderson, Nevada (Foothill/Denver)
James Wypych	Drake	Midfielder	Sophomore	Wellington, New Zealand (St. Patrick’s College/New Mexico)
Alec Bartlett	Drake	Defender	Junior	Overland Park, Kansas (St. James Academy/Creighton)
James Fawke	Missouri State	Defender	Senior	Cheltenham, England, United Kingdom (Bournside School)
Patrick Hodges	Evansville	Defender	Senior	Overland Park, Kansas (St. James Academy/Creighton)
Matt Polster	SIUE	Defender	Senior	Las Vegas, Nevada (Palo Verde)
Eric Schoendorf	Loyola	Defender	Junior	Delafield, Wisconsin (Catholic Memorial)

=== 2014 MVC All-Conference Second Team ===
Player	School	Position	Class	Hometown (High school?Previous college)
Kent Kobernus	SIUE	Goalkeeper	Senior	Millstadt, Illinois (Belleville West/Wisconsin)
Cody Lofgren	Bradley	Forward	Senior	Cleveland, Texas (Kingwood Park/Oral Roberts)
Charlie Macias	Evansville	Forward	Senior	Westerville, Ohio (St. Charles Prep)
Christian Okeke	Bradley	Forward	Sophomore	Wichita Falls, Texas (S. H. Rider)
Elliot Collier	Loyola	Midfielder	Freshman	Hamilton, New Zealand (Saint Paul’s Collegiate)
Jack Roberts	Missouri State	Midfielder	Senior	Leicester, England, United Kingdom (John Cleveland College)
Luis Romero	Evansville	Midfielder	Senior	Louisville, Kentucky (Male)
Grant Bell	Bradley	Defender	Junior	Little Falls, Minnesota (Little Falls Community)
Brandon Besong	Missouri State	Defender	Senior	Cedar Rapids, Iowa (George Washington)
Justin Bilyeu	SIUE	Defender	Junior	St. Louis, Missouri (CBC)
Parker Maher	Missouri STate	Defender	Senior	Joplin, Missouri (Joplin)

=== 2014 MVC All-Freshman Team ===
Player	School	Position	Hometown (High school)
Harrison Veith	Central Arkansas	Goalkeeper	Richmond, Texas (Foster)
Gabe Edel	Drake	Forward	Greenwood, Indiana (Center Grove)
Steven Enna	Drake	Forward	Overland Park, Kansas (St. James Academy)
Elliot Collier	Loyola	Midfielder	Hamilton, New Zealand (Saint Paul’s Collegiate)
Brody Kraussel	Loyola	Midfielder	Milwaukee, Wisconsin (Muskego)
Ian McGrath	Evansville	Midfielder	New Lenox, Illinois (Lincoln-Way West)
Kyle Thomson	Loyola	Midfielder	Park Ridge, Illinois (Maine South)
William Woody	Central Arkansas	Midfielder	Asheville, North Carolina (Home school)
Mason Leonard	Drake	Defender	Overland Park, Kansas (Blue Valley Northwest)
Rob Oslica	Missouri State	Defender	Ozark, Missouri. (Ozark)
Jacob Taylor	Bradley	Defender	Dunlap, Illinois (Dunlap)

=== 2014 MVC All-Tournament Team ===
2014 Missouri Valley Conference Men's Soccer Tournament MVP— Jabari Danzy, SIUE

Player	School	Position
Brian Bement	Loyola	Forward
Justin Bilyeu	SIUE	Defender
Andrew Brown	Bradley	Midfielder
Jabari Danzy	SIUE	Midfielder
James Fawke	Missouri State	Defender
Patrick Hodges	Evansville	Defender
Kent Kobernus	SIUE	Goalkeeper
Cody Lofgren	Bradley	Forward
Brian Lunar	Loyola	Defender
Parker Maher	Missouri State	Defender
Matt Polster	SIUE	Defender
Alex Troester	Drake	Midfielder
Andrew Turner	Missouri State	Defender

=== 2014 MVC Men's Soccer Scholar-Athlete Team ===
Player	School	Year	GPA	Major	Hometown (High School / Previous School)
Alec Bartlett	Drake	Junior	3.56	Biology	Overland Park, Kansas (St. James Academy)
Brandon Besong	Missouri State	Senior	3.52	Accounting	Cedar Rapids, Iowa (George Washington)
Sam Cusack	Central Arkansas	Senior	3.90	Finance	London, England (— \ Yavapai C.C.)
James Fawke	Missouri State	Senior	3.45	Business Administration Management	Cheltenham, England (Bournside School)
Daniel Hare	Loyola	Junior	3.87	Sports Management	Overland Park, Kansas (Rockhurst High)
Andrew Kovacevic	Bradley	Sophomore	3.94	Finance	Naperville, Illinois (Neuqua Valley)
Zach Kovacevic	Bradley	Senior	3.50	Health Science	Naperville, Illinois (Neuqua Valley)
Charlie Macias	Evansville	Senior	3.38	Finance	Westerville, Ohio (St. Charles Prep)
Matt Polster	SIUE	Senior	3.46	Business (Finance)	Las Vegas, Nevada (Palo Verde)
Kevin Schafer	Evansville	Senior	3.90	Mechanical Engineering	Albuquerque, New Mexico (Shattuc-St. Mary's)
Thomas Schermoly	Drake	Senior	3.76	Biology	Olathe, Kansas (St. Thomas Aquinas)
Nick Schroeder	Evansville	Senior	3.95	Pre-Physical Therapy	Brighton, Michigan (Brighton)
Alex Troester	Drake	Junior	3.95	Biochemistry, Cellulary & Molecular Biology	Iowa City, Iowa (Iowa City West)
Addison Watson	Missouri State	Sophomore	3.41	Criminology	Starkville, Mississippi (Starkville)
Jacob Wieser	SIUE	Junior	3.93	Nursing	St. Louis, Missouri (St. Mary's)
