= Harare International School =

- Harare International School Logo

Location
- 66 Pendennis Road, Mount Pleasant; Harare; Zimbabwe
- 17.759107°S 31.0556778°E

Information
- Type: International day school
- Opened: 8 September 1992
- Director: Dr. Gregory Moncada
- Grades: Pre K – 12
- Gender: Co-educational
- Enrollment: 400 (approx.)
- Language: English
- Campus type: Suburban
- Colors: Green and black
- Slogan: HIS: A boldly diverse learning community that inspires curiosity, embraces challenge, and nurtures personal growth.
- Athletics conference: ISSEA
- Nickname: Warthogs
- Accreditation: CIS, IB, NEASC
- School fees: US$3,500 – US$27,600
- Affiliations: AISA; AAIE; ASCD
- Website: www.harare-international-school.com

Harare International School (HIS) is an international, co-educational, day school in Harare, Zimbabwe with around 400 students from pre-kindergarten to twelfth grade. HIS is the only authorized school in Zimbabwe offering the International Baccalaureate (IB) curriculum from Early Childhood through to Grade 12. The IB programmes offered are the Primary Years Programme (PYP), the Middle Years Programme (MYP), and the Diploma Programme (DP).

HIS is accredited with the Council of International Schools, the New England Association of Schools and Colleges, and the International Baccalaureate Organization. Harare International School is an American-sponsored institution, receiving support from the United States Embassy via an annual grant from the US Department of State's Office for Overseas Schools.

== History ==
Harare International School was founded on 8 September 1992 and had 42 students initially. The school's first campus was a house located in a suburb close to the central business district of Harare. In 1994, Harare International School commenced a phased relocation to the current Pendennis Road campus in Mount Pleasant, a suburb in northern Harare.

== About ==
Founded in 1992, Harare International School (HIS) is an independent, non-profit institution, serving students in Early Childhood 1 (EC 1) to grade 12. HIS enrolls approximately 400 students representing over 60 nationalities. This includes 21% from Europe, 23% from North America, 41% from Africa, 8% from Asia and 7% from other areas of the world.

HIS is sponsored by the U.S. Department of State, and the educational program is modeled along North American and International Baccalaureate (IB) guidelines. HIS is fully accredited by the Council of International Schools (CIS) and the New England Association of Schools and Colleges (NEASC). HIS is an IB World School and is authorized to offer the Primary Years Programme and the Diploma Programme. HIS is currently a Middle Years Programme candidate school.

The school has active membership of the Association of International Schools in Africa (AISA), the Association for the Advancement of International Education (AAIE) and the Association for School Curriculum and Development (ASCD).

== International Baccalaureate ==
It has been an IB World school since January 2004, and has been authorised to offer the IB Primary Years Programme (PYP) since June 2004. It also offers the IB Middle Years Programme (MYP) and the IB Diploma Program (IBDP).

== Athletics and extracurricular activities ==
Harare International School is a member of the International Schools of Southern and Eastern Africa (ISSEA), a regional athletic and extra-curricular association of eight international schools in eight countries, South Africa, Zambia, Mozambique, Kenya, Ethiopia, Uganda and Tanzania. The schools meet on a regular basis for cultural/academic activities namely Drama, Music, and STEAM and also compete against each other in Track and Field, Swimming, Basketball, Soccer, and Volleyball hosted by member schools on a rotational basis.

The school also supports after school extracurriculars and a Wider Wednesday program. With this program, secondary students are given Wednesdays to take the extracurriculars offered throughout the day. Those taking the IBDP program also spend some of this time being taught in their Higher Level classes. An activity offered on Wider Wednesdays is STEAM, which not only prepares for the international STEAM event but also local events, such as Full STEAM. A competition with local Zimbabwe schools, one Full STEAM event is creating the second largest Solar System model on Earth with a 1:33,000,000 scale.

== Alumni ==
- Vangelis Haritatos - Zimbabwean politician and businessman
- Sebastien Summerfield - Zimbabwean professional football player

== See also ==
- List of schools in Zimbabwe
- List of international schools
- Education in Zimbabwe
