= Fareda Banda =

Zimbabwean academic, professor of law at SOAS

- Born: Zimbabwe
- Education: University of Zimbabwe; University of Oxford
- Occupations: Academic, professor of law
- Employer: SOAS University of London
- Notable work: African Migration, Human Rights and Literature (2022)

Fareda Banda is a Zimbabwean academic. She is currently a professor of law at SOAS University of London.

== Biography ==
Fareda Banda was born and raised in Zimbabwe. She studied law at the University of Zimbabwe, graduating among the top three. This led her to winning a Beit Fellowship to the University of Oxford, where she completed her doctorate on the topic of "access to justice for women". Upon completing her doctorate, Banda worked for the Law Commission of England and Wales, before returning to Oxford as a post-doctoral researcher.

She has been a professor at SOAS University of London since 1996 at the School of Oriental and African Studies. Her main areas of work include the human rights of women and family law in Africa.

== Career ==
Banda is a former collaborating researcher with UNRISD, where she did work on Women's Rights.

Apart from her work teaching at SOAS University of London, Banda also teaches a summer programme at the University of Oxford on women's rights. She has also taught programmes around the world in cities including Harare, Kampala, Onati and Oslo.

Publications by Banda include Women, Law and Human Rights: An African Perspective (2005) and more recently she is the author of the 2022 interdisciplinary book African Migration, Human Rights and Literature.

In 2023, Banda was chair of the Caine Prize for African Writing, with the other jurors being Edwige-Renée Dro, Kadija George Sesay, Jendella Benson and Warsan Shire, the prize's first all-female judging panel.
