= Amira Elmissiry =

Zimbabwe-born lawyer

- Born: 1982 (age 43–44); Zimbabwe
- Citizenship: Zimbabwe
- Education: Cardiff University (Bachelor of Laws); City Law School (Bar Vocational Course) (Master of Laws); African Leadership University (Master of Business Administration)
- Occupations: Lawyer and investment specialist
- Title: Chief equity and catalytic investment officer at the African Development Bank
- Spouse: Elisha Sulai

Amira Elmissiry is a lawyer who works as the chief equity and chief catalytic investment officer in the Private Sector Operations Division at the African Development Bank, based in Abidjan, in the Ivory Coast. She previously advised Donald Kaberuka, the former president of the bank.

== Background and education ==
Elmissiry was admitted to Cardiff University in 2001 to study law. She graduated with a Bachelor of Laws (LLB) degree in 2004. Between 2004 and 2006, she studied at the Inns of Court School of Law (today, City Law School), where she attended the Bar Professional Training Course, and was called to the bar in the United Kingdom in 2006. She continued her education at the City Law School, graduating in 2009 with a Master of Laws (LLM) degree in 2009, specializing in restorative justice. In 2016, she enrolled in the African Leadership University, where she graduated with a Master of Business Administration (MBA) degree in 2018.

== Work experience ==
For a period of two years, from September 2005 until September 2007, Elmissiry worked as the programme manager and principal researcher at a non-governmental organization called Initiatives of Change International, where her work took her between London and Geneva. She also worked as a project manager and human rights lecturer at the University of the Witwatersrand, as part of a project funded by the German Technical Cooperation and the Southern African Development Community called Drama for Life, from January 2007 until May 2008.

In August 2009, she was hired by the African Development Bank in Tunis, Tunisia, as assistant to the secretary general, where she worked until August 2010. She then was appointed as an investment officer in the Private Sector and Microfinance Operations Division of the bank, helping to establish its private equity practice. She was promoted to senior legal counsel in private sector operations, serving in that capacity for nearly three years, until April 2014.

In April 2014, Elmissiry was transferred to Abidjan, Ivory Coast, and was appointed as a special assistant to the president of the African Development Bank, a position she occupied for nearly two years, until February 2016. In 2016, she was promoted to chief equity and catalytic investment officer, Private Sector Operations at the bank.

== Other considerations ==
In 2014, she was named among "The 20 Youngest Power Women In Africa", by Forbes Magazine. For five consecutive years, from 2015 until 2020, she was named by Choiseul 100 Africa as one of the Top 100 Economic Leaders of Africa. In 2017, she was named one of the 100 Global Most Influential People of African Descent Under 40 (MIPAD).
