= Emerald Hill, Harare =

Suburb of Harare, Zimbabwe

Coordinates: 17°46′33″S 31°01′41″E

Emerald Hill is a north-western suburb of Harare, Zimbabwe. The suburb was named so because of either (i) the colour of the hill due to the large number of trees or (ii) an Irish connection: many of the roads in the suburb have Irish names.

On the hill in the centre of the suburb are located a school for the deaf and a children's home. Emerald Hill is also home to St. John's High School and Gateway High School (Zimbabwe), two of the city's best high schools.

== History ==
Originally part of Avondale Farm, which was peri-urban to the early City of Harare, Emerald Hill was incorporated into the city in 1934. The northwest corner of Emerald Hill, known as "New Emerald Hill" was originally under the Marlborough Town Management Board and incorporated into the City of Harare in 1971, but only built up in late 1990s.

== Features ==
Emerald Hill is thought to have been named so either due to its verdant hill due to the large number of trees or its many Irish connections – many of the roads in the suburb have Irish origins, such as Dublin, Belfast, Wicklow and Cork. The area is also notable for its Catholic institutions such as St. John's High School and the Dominican Convent.

While the area was home to an Irish community they have largely been assimilated into the larger white Zimbabwean community or have joined the ranks of the Zimbabwean diaspora abroad. Like parts of the North West, Emerald Hill is relatively well off, leafy and quiet but have become slightly rough around the edges since the mid-2000s. The country's economic crisis in that decade led to thousands of local university-educated residents and professionals emigrating to the United Kingdom, Canada and Australia, thus the area lacks much of the wealth and vibrancy it had in the nineties and early 2000s.

== Points of interest ==
Notable institutions in Emerald Hill include;

- St. John's High School
- Gateway High School
- Emerald Hill Children's Home
- Emerald Hill School For The Deaf
- Ethiopian Airlines Corporate Office
- Old Mutual
- Prices Avenue Golf Range
- The Southern African Power Pool (SAPP)
