= List of populated places in Zimbabwe =

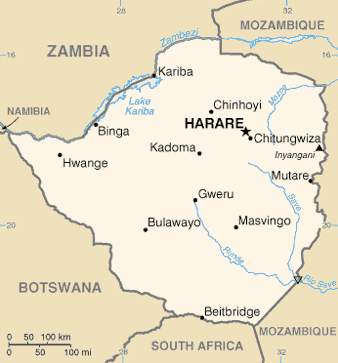
Map of Zimbabwe

This is a list of cities, towns and villages in Zimbabwe. See also: Place names in Zimbabwe.

== Cities ==
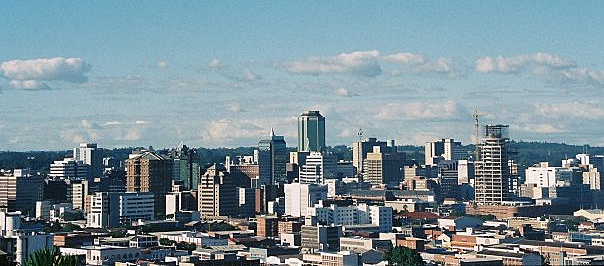
Harare

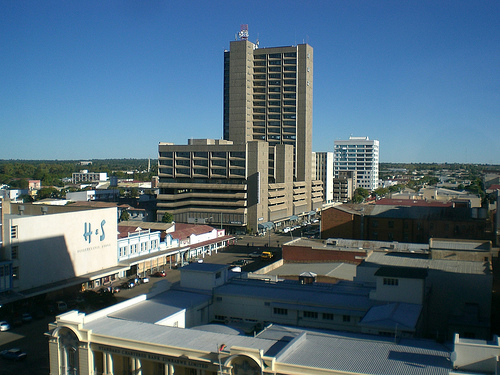
Bulawayo

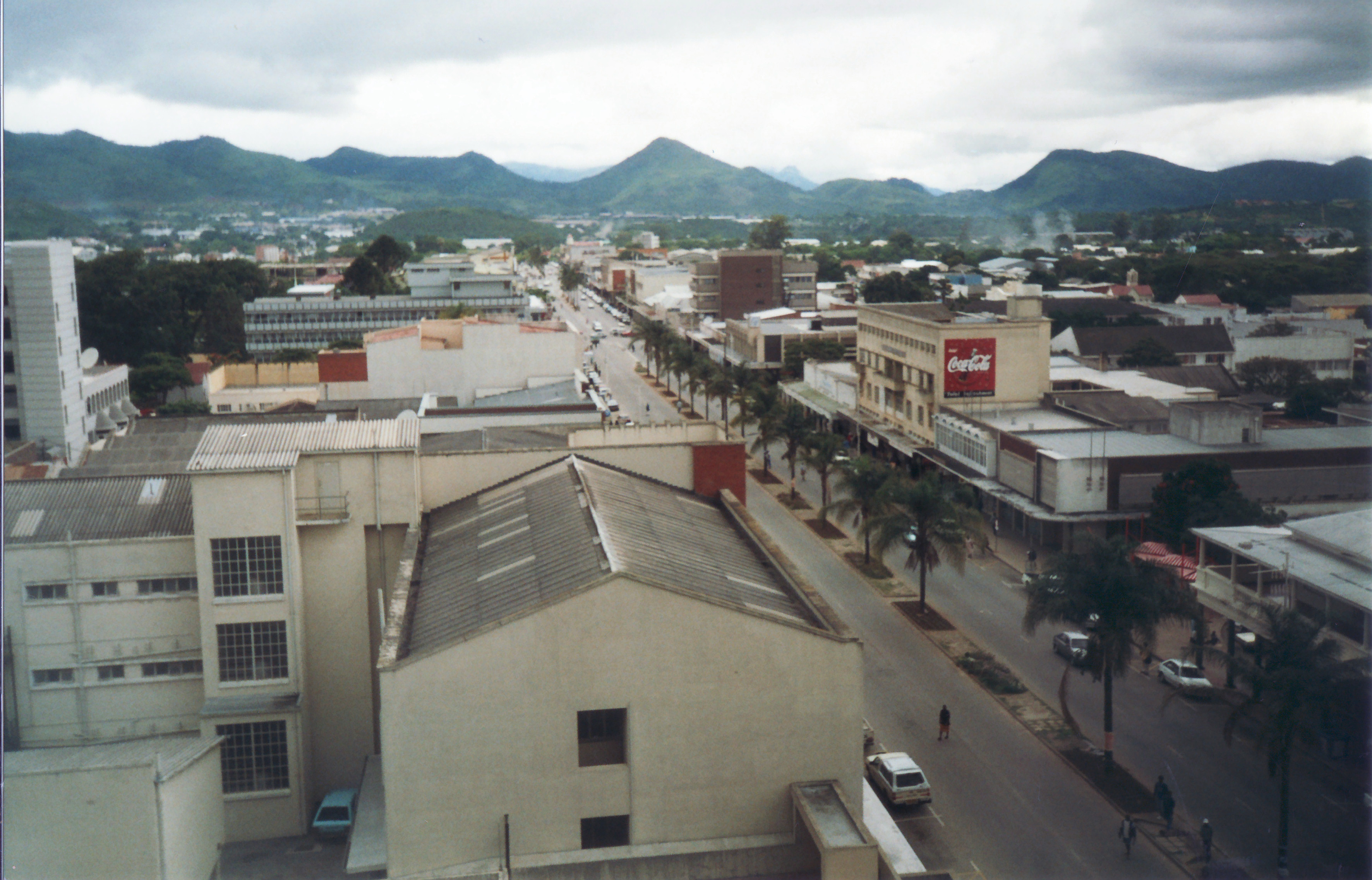
Mutare

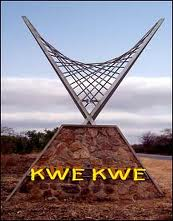
Kwekwe

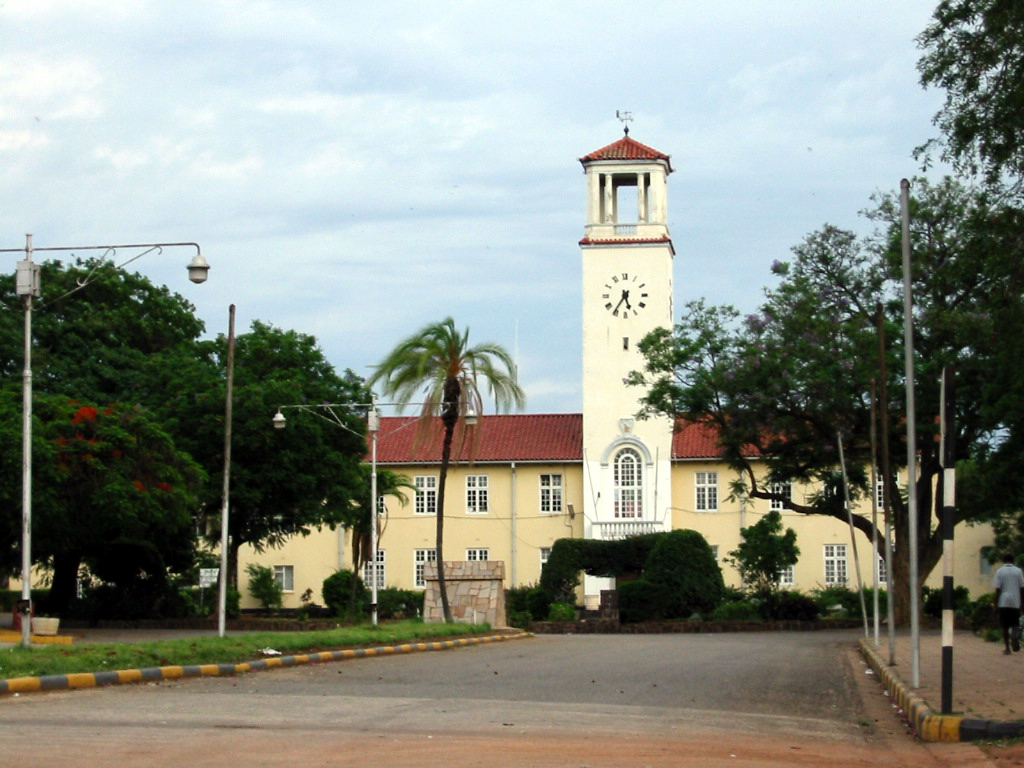
Kadoma

Cities in Zimbabwe
City	Province	Census 1982	Census 1992	Census 2002	Census 2012	Census 2022
Harare	Harare	656,011	1,189,103	1,435,784	1,485,231	1,849,600
Bulawayo	Bulawayo	413,814	621,742	676,650	653,337	665,940
Chitungwiza	Harare	172,556	274,912	323,260	356,840	371,244
Mutare	Manicaland	69,621	131,367	170,466	186,208	224,802
Epworth	Harare	–	–	114,067	167,462	206,365
Gweru	Midlands	78,918	128,037	140,806	154,825	161,292
Kwekwe	Midlands	47,607	75,425	93,608	100,900	119,863
Kadoma	Mashonaland West	44,613	67,750	76,351	91,633	117,380
Masvingo	Masvingo	30,523	51,743	69,993	87,866	90,286
Chinhoyi	Mashonaland West	24,322	43,054	48,912	68,273	103,671
Norton	Mashonaland West	-	20,405	44,397	67,591	87,038
Marondera	Mashonaland East	24,322	43,054	51,847	61,998	66,203
Ruwa	Mashonaland East	–	–	22,155	56,678	94,083
Chegutu	Mashonaland West	19,606	30,191	43,424	50,255	65,800
Zvishavane	Midlands	26,597	32,984	35,128	45,230	59,714
Bindura	Mashonaland Central	18,243	21,167	33,637	42,861	50,400
Beitbridge	Matabeleland South	–	11,596	21,906	41,767	58,574
Redcliff	Midlands	22,109	29,959	32,417	35,904	41,526
Victoria Falls	Matabeleland North	8,126	16,826	31,519	33,660	35,215
Hwange	Matabeleland North	7,125	14,878	30,519	33,210	39,750
Rusape	Manicaland	8,216	13,920	22,741	30,316	37,906
Chiredzi	Masvingo	10,257	21,116	25,849	30,197	40,100
Kariba	Mashonaland West	12,364	20,736	22,726	26,112	27,450
Karoi	Mashonaland West	8,748	14,763	22,383	26,009	37,564
Chipinge	Manicaland	6,077	11,582	16,539	25,214	34,959
Gokwe	Midlands	–	7,418	17,703	23,906	33,073
Shurugwi	Midlands	13,255	16,138	16,863	21,501	23,304

== Harare Province ==
- Chitungwiza
- Epworth
- Harare

== Manicaland ==
- Birchenough Bridge
- Buhera
- Cashel
- Chimanimani
- Chipinge
- Chisumbanje
- Craigmore
- Dorowa
- Gumira
- Hauna
- Headlands
- Juliasdale
- Junction Gate
- Massi Kessi
- Mount Selinda
- Murambinda
- Mutambara
- Mutare (provincial capital)
- Nyanga
- Nyanyadzi
- Nyazura
- Odzi
- Penhalonga
- Rusape
- Sakubva
- Sanyatwe
- Stapleford
- Tandaai
- Tizvione
- Troutbeck
- Tsanzaguru
- Watsomba
- Zimunya

== Mashonaland Central ==
- Bindura
- Centenary
- Concession
- Domboshava
- Guruve
- Jumbo
- Kanyemba
- Madziwa Mine
- Manhenga
- Mazowe
- Melfort
- Mount Darwin
- Mukumbura
- Mushumbi Pools
- Muzarabani District
- Mvurwi
- Shamva
- Tengenenge

== Mashonaland East ==
- Arcturus
- Beatrice
- Bromley
- Chivhu
- Goromonzi
- Kotwa
- Macheke
- Marondera
- Mount Hampden
- Murewa
- Mutoko
- Nyabira
- Nyamapanda
- Rocky Spruit
- Ruwa
- Shinga
- Wilton

== Mashonaland West ==
- Alaska
- Banket
- Battlefields
- Caesar
- Chakari
- Charara
- Chegutu
- Chirundu
- Chinhoyi (provincial capital)
- Darwendale
- Eiffel Flats
- Eldorado
- Feock
- Gadzema
- Golden Valley
- Kadoma
- Kariba
- Karoi
- Kildonan
- Kutama
- Lion's Den
- Madadzi
- Magunje
- Makuti
- Makwiro
- Mhangura
- Mubayira
- Muriel
- Murombedzi
- Mutorashanga
- Muzvezve
- Mwami
- Norton
- Raffingora
- Sanyati
- Selous
- Shackleton
- Tashinga
- Tengwe
- Trelawney
- Umsweswe
- Vanad
- Venice
- Vuti
- Zave

== Masvingo ==
- Baradzanwa
- Boora
- Chatsworth
- Chibwedziva
- Chigumisirwa
- Chikuku
- Chikukutu
- Chiredzi
- Chiremwaremwa
- Chirorwe
- Devure
- Devure Ranch
- Felixburg
- Gurajena
- Magocha
- Maranda
- Marozva (a)
- Marozva (b)
- Mashava
- Mashoko
- Masvingo (provincial capital)
- Matibi
- Matsvange
- Mazungunye
- Mbizi
- Mukore
- Mungezi
- Mupamande
- Mupandawana
- Murwira
- Museti
- Mutikizizi
- Ndanga
- Negovano
- Neshuro
- Ngundu
- Nyahunda
- Nyarushiri
- Renco
- Rutenga
- Sango
- Shenjere Village
- Triangle
- Tswiza

== Matabeleland North ==
- Bembezi
- Binga village
- Bradfield
- Dakamela
- Dete
- Eastnor
- Inyati
- Jotsholo
- Kamativi
- Kariyangwe
- Kazungula
- Lonely Mine
- Matetsi
- Mbuma
- Mlibizi
- Mpandamatenga
- Nkayi
- Nyamandhlovu
- Queen's Mine
- Shangani
- Turk Mine
- Victoria Falls

== Matabeleland South ==
- Alisupi
- Antelope Mine
- Bezu
- Blanket Mine
- Brunapeg
- Colleen Bawn
- Esigodini
- Esimbomvu
- Figtree
- Filabusi
- Fumukwe
- Gwai
- Gwanda
- Hwali
- Kezi
- Lutumba
- Manama
- Marinoha
- Marula
- Mazunga
- Plumtree
- Towla
- Tuli
- Vubachikwe
- West Nicholson

== Midlands ==
- Cha Cha Cha Township
- Columbina Rural Service Center
- Connmara
- Empress Mine Township
- Gokwe centre
- Gweru (provincial capital)
- Gweru District
- Kwekwe
- Lalapanzi
- Lower Gwelo
- Marira
- Munyati
- Mvuma
- Redcliff
- Shurugwi
- Shurugwi Rural Areas
- Silobela
- Somabhula
- Vungu Rural District Council
- Zhombe
- Zvishavane

== See also ==
- List of cities in East Africa
- List of rivers of Zimbabwe
