= Chikuku, Zimbabwe =

Chikuku
- Ward and Village
- Location in Zimbabwe
- Coordinates: 19°59′S 31°52′E
- Country: Zimbabwe
- Province: Masvingo Province
- District: Bikita District
- Time zone: UTC+2 (Central Africa Time)

Chikuku is a ward and village business centre in Bikita District of Masvingo Province in south-eastern Zimbabwe. At the Chikuku Business Centre is a T-junction between the Mutare-Masvingo Highway and a gravel road to the old Umkondo Copper Mine, Devure, and Zaka. Due to this Chikuku Business Centre was also known as Umkondo Mine Halt before the mine was closed in 1972.

The Chibvumani Ruins, a dry-stone fortress post-dating Great Zimbabwe, are located east of Chikuku Business Centre.

Approximately 2 km south of Chikuku Business Centre are the Chikuku Hospital, in existence since the 1950s when Umkondo Mine was still operational and St. Alphonce Chikuku School, a Catholic school. There is a Catholic run Vocational Training Centre at Chikuku Business Centre where youths are trained.

Chikuku was one of the first sites of attacks by Emmerson Mnangagwa and the "Crocodile Group" during the Second Chimurenga in 1964.
