= Chikukutu =

- Ward
- Location in Zimbabwe
- Coordinates: 19°57′S 31°34′E
- Country: Zimbabwe
- Province: Masvingo Province
- District: Bikita District

Population (2022)
  - Total: 4,817
- Time zone: UTC+2 (Central Africa Time)

Chikukutu is a ward in Bikita District of Masvingo Province in south-eastern Zimbabwe. The main settlement is Nyika Growth Point, which has a hospital.
