= Telephone numbers in Zimbabwe =

- Zimbabwe (dark green)
- Country: Zimbabwe
- Continent: Africa
- NSN length: 9
- Country code: +263
- International access: 00
- Long-distance: 0

The following are the telephone codes in Zimbabwe.

== In the same town/city ==
For calls inside the same geographic numbering area (local calls), dial the Subscriber Number only (this includes the Prefixing Number).

== To another town/city ==
To make a call from one town or city to another within Zimbabwe, a subscriber should dial the area code (with the preceding zero "0"), followed by the New Added Prefixing Number, and the required subscriber number.

== International calls ==
Zimbabwe was allocated its own country code by the International Telecommunication Union, +263, in the late 1960s, when it was known as Rhodesia.

- To call a Zimbabwean number from another country: dial: the international access code (i.e. 00 for most European countries, and 011 from North America), followed by the country code (263), followed by the area code, and then the required subscriber number. Example for calling a subscriber in Harare, Zimbabwe, dial: 00 263 24 2xx xxx (x= subscriber number). The zero (0) at the beginning of the area code is dropped when calling with the country code (263). Until the 1990s, calls to Zimbabwe could be made from South Africa using the regional code 0194.
- For international calls from Zimbabwe, dial the international Access Prefix "00" followed by the country code and the National Significant Number for the subscriber. Until 1996, the international access code was 110.

== List of Zimbabwe Landline Telephone area codes ==
List of area codes (Over View)
City/Town	Old Area Code	New Area Code	Prefixing Number	Example of Phone Number (x=Existing Subscriber Number)
Harare	04	024	2	(024) 2xxxxxx
Ruwa	0273	024	213	(024) 213xxxx
Norton	062	024	215	(024) 215xxxx
Arcturus	0274	024	214	(024) 214xxxx
Beatrice	065	024	2150	(024) 2150xxx
Chitungwiza	0270	024	21	(024) 21xxxxx
Birchenough Bridge	0248	027	203	(027) 203xxxx
Checheche	0317	027	2317	(027) 2317xxx
Chimanimani	026	027	205	(027) 205xxxx
Chipangayi	024	027	2046	(027) 2046xxx
Chipinge	0227	027	204	(027) 204xxxx
Mutare	020	020	20	(020) 20xxxxx
Dangamvura	020	020	21	(020) 21xxxxx
Penhalonga	020	020	24	(020) 24xxxxx
Odzi	0204	020	200	(020) 200xxxx
Hauna	0228	026	209	(026) 209xxxx
Juliasdale	029	026	208	(026) 208xxxx
Nyanga	0329	026	2098	(026) 2098xxx
Murambinda	021	025	206	(025) 206xxxx
Nyazura	02583	025	2055	(025) 2055xxx
Headlands	02582	025	207	(025) 207xxxx
Rusape	0225	025	205	(025) 205xxxx
Bindura	0271	066	210	(066) 210xxxx
Centenary	057	066	210	(066) 210xxxx
Concession	0375	066	219	(066) 219xxxx
Glendale	0376	066	218	(066) 218xxxx
Mazowe	0275	066	219	(066) 219xxxx
Christon Bank	-	066	219	(066) 219xxxx
Mount Darwin	0276	066	212	(066) 212xxxx
Mvurwi	0277	066	216	(066) 216xxxx
Guruve	058	066	217	(066) 217xxxx
Shamva	0371	066	2137	(066) 2137xxx
Darwendale	069	067	2192	(067) 2192xxx
Raffingora	0667	067	2198	(067) 2198xxx
Mutorashanga	0668	067	2196	(067) 2196xxx
Trelawney	0698	067	2136	(067) 2136xxx
Chinhoyi	067	067	21	(067) 21xxxxx
Murombedzi	0675	067	215	(067) 215xxxx
Mhangura	060	067	214	(067) 214xxxx
Banket	066	067	214	(067) 214xxxx
Kariba	0261	061	214	(061) 214xxxx
Karoi	0264	061	215	(061) 215xxxx
Makuti	063	061	2141	(061) 2141xxx
Chirundu	0637	061	2140	(061) 2140xxx
Kadoma	068	068	21	(068) 21xxxxx
Chegutu	053	068	215	(068) 215xxxx
Chakari	0688	068	2189	(068) 2189xxx
Sanyati	0687	068	216	(068) 216xxxx
Selous	0628	068	21	(068) 21xxxxx
Macheke	0379	065	2080	(065) 2080xxx
Marondera	0279	065	23	(065) 23xxxxx
Wedza	0222	065	208	(065) 208xxxx
Murewa	0278	065	21	(065) 21xxxxx
Mutoko	0272	065	213	(065) 213xxxx
Masvingo	039	039	2	(039) 2xxxxxx
Jerera	034	039	234	(039) 234xxxx
Nyaningwe	0337	039	2380	(039) 2380xxx
Mataga	0517	039	2366	(039) 2366xxx
Mberengwa	0518	039	2360	(039) 2360xxx
Gutu	030	039	230	(039) 230xxxx
Mashava	035	039	245	(039) 245xxxx
Nyika	0338	039	2323	(039) 2323xxx
Zvishavane	051	039	235	(039) 235xxxx
Chatsworth	0308	039	2308	(039) 2308xxx
Chiredzi	031	031	-	(031) 231xxxx
Triangle	033	031	233	(031) 233xxxx
Rutenga	014	031	2337	(031) 2337xxx
Ngundu	036	031	2370	(031) 2370xxx
Bulawayo	09	029	2	(029) 2xxxxxx
Tsholotsho	0287	029	2861	(029) 2861xxx
Nyamandlovu	0387	029	2821	(029) 2821xxx
Turkmine	0285	029	2803	(029) 2803xxx
Shangani	050	029	2802	(029) 2802xxx
Esigodini	0288	029	2800	(029) 2800xxx
Figtree	0283	029	2804	(089) 2804xxx
Kezi	0282	029	2807	(089) 2807xxx
Matopos	0383	029	2809	(089) 2809xxx
Baobab	0281	081	28	(081) 28xxxxx
Binga	015	081	2847	(081) 2847xxx
Dete	018	081	2835	(081) 2835xxx
Hwange	0281	081	28	(081) 28xxxxx
Jotsholo	0289	081	2875	(081) 2875xxx
Lupane	0398	081	2856	(081) 2856xxx
Victoria Falls	013	083	28	(083) 28xxxxx
Beit Bridge	0286	085	23	(085) 23xxxxx
Plumtree	0219	089	280	(089) 280xxxx
Filabusi	017	084	2801	(084) 2801xxx
Collen Bawn	-	084	2835	(084) 2835xxx
Gwanda	0284	084	28	(084) 28xxxxx
West Nicholson	016	084	2808	(084) 2808xxx
Gweru	054	054	2	(054) 2xxxxxx
Shurugwi	052	054	252	(054) 252xxxx
Mvuma	032	054	2532	(054) 2532xxx
Lalapanzi	05483	054	2548	(054) 2548xxx
Chivhu	056	054	212	(054) 212xxxx
Kwekwe	055	055	25	(055) 25xxxxx
Redcliff	055	055	25	(055) 25xxxxx
Battle Fields	055	055	25	(055) 25xxxxx
Gokwe	059	055	259	(055) 259xxxx
Nkayi	0558	055	2558	(055) 2558xxx
Munyati	0557	055	2557	(055) 2557xxx

== Detailed list of area codes ==
=== 1. Harare ===
Detailed list of area codes in Harare
No.	Exchange Name	Exchange Code	Start Number	End Number	Available Numbers
1	Arcturus	024	2142000	2142999	1000
2	Athlone	024	2448000	2448999	1000
3	Athlone	024	2492000	2492999	1000
4	Avondale Host	024	2307000	2308999	2000
5	Avondale Host	024	2371000	2379999	9000
6	Avondale Host	024	2302000	2304999	3000
7	Avondale Host	024	2339000	2339999	1000
8	Avondale Host	024	2332000	2337999	6000
9	Avondale Host	024	2326000	2329999	4000
10	Beatrice	024	2150200	2150899	700
11	Belvedere	024	2740000	2741999	2000
12	Bluffhill	024	2310000	2310999	1000
13	Bluffhill	024	2331000	2331999	1000
14	Bluffhill	024	2305000	2305999	1000
15	Borrowdale Host	024	2850000	2855999	6000
16	Borrowdale Host	024	2858000	2859999	2000
17	Borrowdale Host	024	2870000	2870999	1000
18	Borrowdale Host	024	2880000	2886999	7000
19	Braeside	024	2782000	2782999	1000
20	Braeside	024	2742000	2743999	2000
21	Chitungwiza	024	2121000	2131999	11000
22	Dzivarasekwa	024	2216000	2217999	2000
23	Eastlea	024	2746000	2746999	1000
24	Eastlea	024	2776000	2776999	1000
25	Eastlea	024	2788000	2788999	1000
26	Epworth	024	2577000	2577999	1000
27	Glen Norah	024	2680000	2680999	1000
28	Glen Norah	024	2613000	2613999	1000
29	Glen View Host	024	2645000	2649999	5000
30	Glen View Host	024	2682000	2688999	7000
31	Glen View Host	024	2690000	2697999	8000
32	Gunhill	024	2744000	2745999	2000
33	Gunhill	024	2783000	2783999	1000
34	Harare Airport	024	2575000	2575999	1000
35	Harare Airport	024	2585000	2585999	1000
36	Harare Soft Client	024	2000000	2011199	11200
37	Hatfield Host	024	2570000	2574999	5000
38	Hatfield Host	024	2578000	2584999	7000
39	Hatfield Host	024	2586000	2588999	3000
40	Hatfield Host	024	2500000	2509999	10000
41	Highfield	024	2689000	2689999	1000

=== 2. Bulawayo ===
Detailed list of area codes in Bulawayo
No.	Exchange Name	Exchange Code	Start Number	End Number	Available Numbers
1	Bellevue	029	2460000	2479999	20000
2	Bulawayo	029	2260000	2279999	20000
3	Bulawayo	029	2320000	2321999	2000
4	Bulawayo	029	2330000	2330999	1000
5	Bulawayo	029	2360000	2360999	1000
6	Bulawayo	029	2880000	2889999	10000
7	Cowdray Park	029	2560000	2569999	10000
8	Esigodini	029	2800200	2800899	700
9	Figtree	029	2804000	2804899	900
10	Hillside	029	2240000	2249999	10000
11	Kezi	029	2807200	2807899	700
12	Killarney	029	2290000	2299999	10000
13	Luveve	029	2520000	2529999	10000
14	Mabutweni	029	2400000	2419999	20000
15	Matopos	029	2809200	2809899	700
16	Nkulumane	029	2480000	2499999	20000
17	Northend	029	2200000	2219999	20000
18	Nyamandlovu	029	2821200	2821899	700
19	Pumula	029	2420000	2439999	20000
20	Queensdale	029	2227000	2228999	2000
21	Queensdale	029	2226000	2226999	1000
22	Riverside	029	2280000	2289999	10000
23	Shangani	029	2802200	2802899	700
24	Suburbs	029	2250000	2259999	10000
25	Suburbs	029	2230000	2239999	10000
26	Tsholotsho	029	2861200	2861899	700
27	Turkmine	029	2803200	2803899	700

=== 3. Mashonaland ===
Detailed list of area codes in Mashonaland
No.	Exchange Name	Exchange Code	Start Number	End Number	Available Numbers
1	Banket	067	2142000	2143999	2000
2	Bindura	066	2106000	2107999	2000
3	Centenary	066	2102000	2102999	1000
4	Chakari	068	2189200	2189899	700
5	Chegutu	068	2152200	2155499	3300
6	Chinhoyi	067	2121000	2129999	9000
7	Chirundu	061	2140200	2140899	700
8	Christon Bank	066	2195500	2196999	1500
9	Concession	066	2192000	2192999	1000
10	Darwendale	067	2192200	2192899	700
11	Glendale	066	2182000	2182899	900
12	Guruve	066	2172000	2172999	1000
13	Kadoma	068	2131000	2132999	2000
14	Kadoma - Ngezi	068	2134000	2134999	1000
15	Kadoma - Rimuka	068	2122000	2128999	7000
16	Kariba	061	2145000	2146799	1800
17	Karoi	061	2142000	2143699	1700
18	Macheke	065	2080200	2080899	700
19	Makuti	061	2141200	2141899	700
20	Marondera	065	2320000	2328999	9000
21	Marondera	065	2728000	2729999	2000
22	Mazowe	066	2195000	2195499	500
23	Mhangura	067	2145000	2145999	1000
24	Mount Darwin	066	2122200	2124199	2000
25	Murewa	065	2122000	2124999	3000
26	Murombedzi	067	2152000	2152999	1000
27	Mutoko	065	2132000	2132999	1000
28	Mutorashanga	067	2196200	2196899	700
29	Mvurwi	066	2162000	2162999	1000
30	Raffingora	067	2198200	2198899	700
31	Sanyati	068	2162000	2162999	1000
32	Selous	068	2144000	2144999	1000
33	Selous	068	2008500	2010599	2100
34	Shamva	066	2137200	2137899	700
35	Trelawney	067	2136200	2136899	700
36	Wedza	065	2082000	2082999	1000

=== 4. Midlands ===
Detailed list of area codes in Midlands
No.	Exchange Name	Exchange Code	Start Number	End Number	Available Numbers
1	Battle Fields	055	2570000	2570999	1000
2	Chivhu	054	2122000	2123999	2000
3	Gokwe	055	2592000	2593999	2000
4	Gweru Host	054	2220000	2233999	14000
5	Kwekwe Main	055	2520000	2526999	7000
6	Lalapanzi	054	2548200	2548899	700
7	Mbizo 1 & 2	055	2540000	2547999	8000
8	Mkoba 1	054	2250000	2253999	4000
9	Mkoba 2	054	2255000	2258999	4000
10	Munyati	055	2557200	2557899	700
11	Mvuma	054	2532200	2532899	700
12	Nkayi	055	2558200	2558899	700
13	Redcliff	055	2562000	2563999	2000
14	Redcliff	055	2568000	2569999	2000
15	Senga	054	2260000	2262999	3000
16	Shurugwi	054	2526000	2528999	3000

=== 5. Manicaland ===
Detailed list of area codes in Manicaland
No.	Exchange Name	Exchange Code	Start Number	End Number	Available Numbers
1	Birchenough Bridge	027	2032000	2032999	1000
2	Checheche	027	2317200	2317899	700
3	Chikanga MSAN	020	2010000	2011599	1600
4	Chimanimani	027	2052000	2053999	2000
5	Chipangayi	027	2046200	2046899	700
6	Chipinge	027	2045600	2045799	200
7	Chipinge	027	2044400	2044599	200
8	Chipinge	027	2042000	2043499	1500
9	Dangamvura	020	2130000	2131999	2000
10	Dangamvura MSAN	020	2030000	2032099	2100
11	Hauna	026	2092000	2092999	1000
12	Headlands	025	2072000	2072999	1000
13	Juliasdale	026	2082200	2084199	2000
14	Murambinda	025	2062000	2062999	1000
15	Murambinda	025	2058000	2058499	500
16	Mutare Fetex	020	2060000	2069999	10000
17	Mutare MSAN	020	2020000	2025999	6000
18	Nyanga	026	2098000	2098799	800
19	Nyazura	025	2055200	2055899	700
20	Odzi	020	2002000	2002999	1000
21	Penhalonga	020	2422200	2422999	800
22	Rusape MSAN	025	2050000	2054499	4500

=== 6. Masvingo ===
Detailed list of area codes in Masvingo
No.	Exchange Name	Exchange Code	Start Number	End Number	Available Numbers
1	Chatsworth	039	2308200	2308899	700
2	Chiredzi	031	2315000	2317499	2500
3	Chiredzi	031	2312000	2314199	2200
4	Gutu	039	2302000	2303999	2000
5	Jerera	039	2342000	2342999	1000
6	Mashava	039	2452000	2452999	1000
7	Masvingo	039	2277000	2277999	1000
8	Masvingo	039	2260700	2269699	9000
9	Mataga	039	2366200	2366899	700
10	Mberengwa	039	2360200	2360899	700
11	Mucheke RSM	039	2252000	2255999	4000
12	Ngundu	031	2370200	2370899	700
13	Nyaningwe	039	2380200	2381999	1800
14	Nyika	039	2323200	2323899	700
15	Rutenga	031	2337200	2337899	700
16	Triangle	031	2335000	2336999	2000
17	Zvishavane	039	2355500	2357999	2500
18	Zvishavane	039	2352000	2354999	3000

=== 7. Matabeleland ===
Detailed list of area codes in Matabeleland
No.	Exchange Name	Exchange Code	Start Number	End Number	Available Numbers
1	Baobab	081	2830000	2834999	5000
2	Beit Bridge	085	2322000	2323999	2000
3	Binga	081	2847200	2847899	700
4	Collen Bawn (CBN)	084	2835000	2835199	200
5	Dete	081	2835200	2835899	700
6	Filabusi	084	2801000	2801999	1000
7	Gwanda	084	2829000	2829999	1000
8	Gwanda	084	2820000	2825999	6000
9	Hwange	081	2820000	2824999	5000
10	Jotsholo	081	2875000	2875999	1000
11	Lupane	081	2856000	2857999	2000
12	Plumtree	089	2805000	2807999	3000
13	Victoria Falls (Airport)	083	2840000	2849999	10000
14	West Nicholson	084	2808200	2808899	700

== Public Mobile Telecommunication Network Services (Cellphone Service) ==
National Subscriber Numbers for Public Mobile Telecommunication Network Services are non-geographic numbers and consists of the National Destination Code and the Subscriber Number.

== How to call a Zimbabwe mobile phone number ==
- For local Mobile to Mobile calls or mobile to PSTN /VoIP national calls, the national prefix “0” needs to be dialled first, followed by the complete national destination number.
- For International Calls, dial the international Access Prefix “00” followed by the country code and the National Number for the subscriber.

List of Mobile Phone Operators in Zimbabwe
Mobile Network Operator	National Destination Number		National Significant Number length
Mobile Network Operator	Mobile National Destination Code	National Subscriber Number	National Significant Number length
NetOne Cellular	71	2 XXX XXX	9
NetOne Cellular	71	3 XXX XXX	9
NetOne Cellular	71	4 XXX XXX	9
NetOne Cellular	71	5 XXX XXX	9
NetOne Cellular	71	6 XXX XXX	9
NetOne Cellular	71	7 XXX XXX	9
NetOne Cellular	71	8 XXX XXX	9
NetOne Cellular	71	9 XXX XXX	9
Telecel Zimbabwe	73	2 XXX XXX	9
Telecel Zimbabwe	73	3 XXX XXX	9
Telecel Zimbabwe	73	4 XXX XXX	9
Telecel Zimbabwe	73	5 XXX XXX	9
Telecel Zimbabwe	73	6 XXX XXX	9
Telecel Zimbabwe	73	7 XXX XXX	9
Telecel Zimbabwe	73	8 XXX XXX	9
Telecel Zimbabwe	73	9 XXX XXX	9
Econet Wireless Zimbabwe	77	1 XXX XXX	9
Econet Wireless Zimbabwe	77	2 XXX XXX	9
Econet Wireless Zimbabwe	77	3 XXX XXX	9
Econet Wireless Zimbabwe	77	4 XXX XXX	9
Econet Wireless Zimbabwe	77	5 XXX XXX	9
Econet Wireless Zimbabwe	77	6 XXX XXX	9
Econet Wireless Zimbabwe	77	7 XXX XXX	9
Econet Wireless Zimbabwe	77	8 XXX XXX	9
Econet Wireless Zimbabwe	77	9 XXX XXX	9
Econet Wireless Zimbabwe	78	2 XXX XXX	9
Econet Wireless Zimbabwe	78	3 XXX XXX	9
Econet Wireless Zimbabwe	78	4 XXX XXX	9
Econet Wireless Zimbabwe	78	5 XXX XXX	9
Econet Wireless Zimbabwe	78	6 XXX XXX	9
Econet Wireless Zimbabwe	78	7 XXX XXX	9

== Voice over Internet Telephony (VoIP) Services ==
- National Subscriber Numbers for VoIP services are non-geographic numbers and consists of the National Destination Code (NDC) and the Subscriber Number (SN). For VoIP national calls the national prefix “0” needs to be dialled first, followed by the national significant number (NSN).
- For international Calls, dial the international Access Prefix “00” followed by the country code and the National Significant Number.

VoIP Services operator	National Destination Code (NDC)	National Subscriber Number (SN)	National Significant Number (NSN) Length
Africom (Pvt) Ltd	8644	000000 – 155999	10
Africom (Pvt) Ltd	8644	200000 – 280999	10
Africom (Pvt) Ltd	8644	800000 – 809999	10
Africom (Pvt) Ltd	8644	910000 – 999999	10
Aquiva Wireless (Pvt) Ltd	8630	000000 – 000499	10
Dandemutande	8612	000000 – 009999	10
Liquid Telecoms Zimbabwe	8677	000000 – 665999	10
Liquid Telecoms Zimbabwe	8677	700000 – 779999	10
Liquid Telecoms Zimbabwe	8677	911000 – 912000	10
Pecus Enterprises (Pvt) Ltd	8655	000000 – 025000	10
PowerTel	8611	200000 – 419999	10
Telecontract (Pvt) Ltd	8683	000000 – 009999	10
TelOne (Pvt) Ltd]	8688	000000 – 009999	10
ZARNet	8622	000000 – 009999	10

== Toll Free Numbers ==
The following are toll free number allocations for Zimbabwe:

Operator	Toll Free Code	Toll Free Numbers
TelOne (Pvt) Ltd	0800	0000 – 9999
TelOne (Pvt) Ltd	0800	2231000 – 2234999
TelOne (Pvt) Ltd	0800	2239000 – 2239999
NetOne (Pvt) Ltd	0801	0000 – 9999
PowerTel Communications	0802	0000 – 0999
Econet Wireless Zimbabwe	0808	0000 – 8999

== Special Codes and Access Prefixes ==
Special Codes and Access Prefixes
Digits	Service	Comments/Remarks
"0"	National Access Prefix (Trunk Prefix)	This indicates a call to another geographic area, Mobile Service Number or VoIP Services number.
"00"	International Access Prefix	The digits "00" are used as International Access Prefix. This indicates an international call or a call outside Zimbabwe.
7X	Non-Geographical National Destination Codes (NDC) for Mobile Telephony Services	71 – NetOne Cellular 73 – Telecel Zimbabwe 77 – Econet Wireless Zimbabwe 78 – Econet Wireless Zimbabwe
112	Emergency Services	NetOne, PowerTel Communications Econet Wireless Zimbabwe Telecel Zimbabwe
114	MARS Emergency Call Centre	NetOne
116	Childline Help line	All Mobile Network Operators & Fixed Network
119	Emergency Services	Telecel Zimbabwe
263	Country Code	Zimbabwe Country Code
904	Automatic Ringback	Fixed Network
908	Test Desk	Fixed Network
950	Fault Report -Telephone	Fixed Network
952	Fault Report	Fixed Network
953	Fault Report - Data	Fixed Network
960	Time	Fixed Network
961	Childline	Fixed Network
962	Directory Enquiries	Fixed Network
965	International Directory Enquiries	Fixed Network
966	International Telephone booking	Fixed Network
967	Trunk Demand	Fixed Network
968	Trunk Enquiries	Fixed Network
969	Trunk Booking	Fixed Network
993	Fire	Emergency (Fixed Network)
994	Ambulance	Emergency (Fixed Network)
995	Police	Emergency Fixed Network
999	General Emergency (Fire/ Ambulance/Police)	Emergency (Fixed Network)
86XX	Non-Geographical National Destination Codes (NDC) for VoIP Telephony Services	VoIP Operators
3XXXX	Premium Rate Short Code Services	Mobile Operators
080x	Toll Free Numbers	All Operators
