= Chigumisirwa =

- Ward
- Location in Zimbabwe
- Coordinates: 20°04′39″S 31°50′47″E
- Country: Zimbabwe
- Province: Masvingo
- District: Bikita

Population (2021)
  - Total: 10,325 (est.)
- Time zone: UTC+2 (Central Africa Time)

Chigumisirwa is a ward in Bikita District in south-eastern Zimbabwe. It was badly affected by Cyclone Idai in 2019.
