= Mangondo =

Mangondo Marozva (b)
- Ward
- Interactive map of Mangondo
- Coordinates: 19.985986°S 31.432217°E
- Country: Zimbabwe
- Province: Masvingo Province
- District: Bikita District

Population (2022)
  - Total: 8,253
- Time zone: UTC+2 (Central Africa Time)

Mangondo is a ward in Bikita District of Masvingo Province in south-eastern Zimbabwe.
