= Nyarushiri =

- Ward
- Country: Zimbabwe
- Province: Masvingo Province
- District: Bikita District

Population (2021)
  - Total: 13,216 Est.
- Time zone: UTC+2 (Central Africa Time)

Nyarushiri is a ward in Bikita District of Masvingo Province in south-eastern Zimbabwe.
