= Matsvange =

- Ward
- Interactive map of Matsvange
- Coordinates: 20.172301°S 31.615076°E
- Country: Zimbabwe
- Province: Masvingo Province
- District: Bikita District

Population (2022)
  - Total: 5,568
- Time zone: UTC+2 (Central Africa Time)

Matsvange is a ward in Bikita District of Masvingo Province in southeastern Zimbabwe. It is located to the north of Siya Dam, which provides water for irrigation in the area.

The ward shall be served by Matsvange clinic, once constructions is completed.
