= Mungezi =

- Ward
- Country: Zimbabwe
- Province: Masvingo Province
- District: Bikita District
- Time zone: UTC+2 (Central Africa Time)

Mungezi is a ward in Bikita District of Masvingo Province in south-eastern Zimbabwe. This area is home to one of the best primary schools in Bikita district with the same name.
