= Mutikizizi =

- Ward
- Interactive map of Mutikizizi
- Coordinates: 20.209592°S 31.709207°E
- Country: Zimbabwe
- Province: Masvingo Province
- District: Bikita District

Population (2022)
  - Total: 4,718
- Time zone: UTC+2 (Central Africa Time)

Mutikizizi is a ward in Bikita District of Masvingo Province in south-eastern Zimbabwe.

There is a rural health centre at Mutikizizi.
