= Mwenezi–Chivi =

Mwenezi–Chivi is a constituency represented in the Senate of Zimbabwe. It covers most of both Mwenezi and Chivi in Masvingo Province, and is one of six senatorial constituencies in the province.

The equivalent seats in the House of Assembly are:

- Chivi
- Mwenezi

In the 2008 election, the constituency elected ZANU-PF member Josaya Hungwe as senator, defeating MDC member Noel Mutisi and independent candidate Meinrad Muzenda.
