= Chiremwaremwa =

- Ward
- Location in Zimbabwe
- Coordinates: 20°28′S 31°52′E
- Country: Zimbabwe
- Province: Masvingo Province
- District: Bikita District

Population (2021)
  - Total: 8,976 est.
- Time zone: UTC+2 (Central Africa Time)

Chiremwaremwa is a ward in Bikita District of Masvingo Province in south-eastern Zimbabwe.

The name comes from the Shona word for bat.

The ward is served by Odzi clinic.
