= Chirorwe =

- Ward
- Location in Zimbabwe
- Coordinates: 19°52′S 31°55′E
- Country: Zimbabwe
- Province: Masvingo Province
- District: Bikita District
- Elevation: 4,062 ft (1,238 m)

Population (2022)
  - Total: 7,722
- Time zone: UTC+2 (Central Africa Time)

Chirorwe is a ward in Bikita District of Masvingo Province in south-eastern Zimbabwe. The ward is named after the Chirorwe Mountain, and was badly affected by Cyclone Idai in 2019.

The area is served by Chirorwe clinic.
