= Dewure =

- Ward
- Location in Zimbabwe
- Coordinates: 20°0′S 32°20′E
- Country: Zimbabwe
- Province: Masvingo Province
- District: Bikita District

Population (2022)
  - Total: 6,242
- Time zone: UTC+2 (Central Africa Time)

Dewure is a ward in Bikita District of Masvingo Province in south-eastern Zimbabwe. The northern parts of the ward are the main populated area, Bikita Communal Land, and the east and south are Devure Ranch, formerly a commercial famring area and now a protected areas as the Savé Valley Conservancy

The northern area is served by Devure 1 Clinic.

The ward was badly affected by Cyclone Idai in 2019.
