= Baradzanwa =

- Ward
- Location in Zimbabwe
- Coordinates: 17°42′S 31°44′E
- Country: Zimbabwe
- Province: Masvingo Province
- District: Bikita District

Population (2021)
  - Total: 6,231 est.
- Time zone: UTC+2 (Central Africa Time)

Baradzanwa is a ward in Bikita District of Masvingo Province in south-eastern Zimbabwe.
