= Mazungunye =

- Ward
- Interactive map of Mazungunye
- Coordinates: 20.227401°S 31.614176°E
- Country: Zimbabwe
- Province: Masvingo Province
- District: Bikita District

Population (2022)
  - Total: 6,451
- Time zone: UTC+2 (Central Africa Time)

Mazungunye is a ward in Bikita District of Masvingo Province in south-eastern Zimbabwe. It is located on the east side of Siya Dam, and part of the population removed from the dam basin were resettled in the ward. There is a primary school and a high school, which was attended by prominent politician Job Sikhala.
