= Nyahunda =

- Ward
- Interactive map of Nyahunda
- Coordinates: 20.278540°S 31.683888°E
- Country: Zimbabwe
- Province: Masvingo Province
- District: Bikita District

Population (2021)
  - Total: 1,851 (est.)
- Time zone: UTC+2 (Central Africa Time)

Nyahunda is a ward in Bikita District of Masvingo Province in south-eastern Zimbabwe. It is situated about 140 km south-east of provincial capital Masvingo and about 40 km south of the district centre administration Bikita. It is made up of two settlement sections, the Nyahunda Farms (New Reserves) and the Bikita Communal Lands.

The Nyahunda Farms (new reserves) were created around 1975 as a resettlement of families that were moved after the creation of Siya Dam into areas such as Ngorima. The headmen submit to sub-chief Nyahunda who submits to Chief Mazungunye.

Nyahunda New Reserves has significant agricultural production, each family owns a herd of at least 6 cattle, 10 acres of arable land and large numbers of goats and fowl. The area benefited from the government's rural electrification program with power lines running through the reserves down towards the farms. A number of homesteads have since connected to power supply.

The Bikita Communal Lands in the ward are communal farms that cover the northern part of the ward, including areas around Tagona Secondary School, Mujiji Primary School, Chibvuure Primary School and Checheni Primary School.

The main shopping centre is Ngorima Business Centre near Nyahunda Primary School. There is a clinic at Chibvuure.

There are six primary schools offering primary education to junior students and attendance is above 90% of local junior population. There is only one secondary school that offers senior education, tagona secondary School which is located in the farms near Mujiche river.

There is a police post at Ngorima Business Centre.
