= Magocha =

- Ward
- Interactive map of Magocha
- Coordinates: 20.504341°S 31.783986°E
- Country: Zimbabwe
- Province: Masvingo Province
- District: Bikita District

Government
  - Headman: Magocha

Population (2022)
  - Total: 4,206
- Time zone: UTC+2 (Central Africa Time)

Magocha is a ward in Bikita District of Masvingo Province in south-eastern Zimbabwe.
