= Marozva =

Marozva Marozva a
- Ward
- Interactive map of Marozva
- Coordinates: 20.005874°S 31.514599°E
- Country: Zimbabwe
- Province: Masvingo Province
- District: Bikita District

Population (2022)
  - Total: 4,523
- Time zone: UTC+2 (Central Africa Time)

Marozva is a ward in Bikita District of Masvingo Province in south-eastern Zimbabwe.

The area is served by Marozva Clinic.
