= Boora =

- Ward
- Location in Zimbabwe
- Coordinates: 20.059559°S 31.877765°E
- Country: Zimbabwe
- Province: Masvingo Province
- District: Bikita District
- Time zone: UTC+2 (Central Africa Time)

Boora is a ward, situated in Bikita District, Masvingo Province in south-eastern part of Zimbabwe.

== Bibliography ==
- Wards of Zimbabwe: Mutikizizi, Maramani, Dendele, Masera, Zimbabwe, Dite Ii, Hwali, Marozva, Alisupi, Mazungunye, Nyarushiri, Siyoka Ii, ISBN 9781155731094, General Books, 2010.
