= Golden Valley =

Golden Valley may refer to:

== Places ==
=== Australia ===
- Golden Valley, Tasmania

=== Canada ===
- Val-d'Or (Golden Valley), a town in Quebec

=== Myanmar ===
- Shwetaunggya

=== United Kingdom ===
- Golden Valley, Derbyshire, England
- Golden Valley (Herefordshire), the valley of the River Dore, England
- Golden Valley (Stroud), the valley of the River Frome, England

=== United States ===
- Golden Valley, Arizona
- Golden Valley, Minnesota
- Golden Valley, Nevada
- Golden Valley, North Dakota
- Golden Valley County, Montana
- Golden Valley County, North Dakota
- Golden Valley Township, Roseau County, Minnesota

=== Zimbabwe ===
- Golden Valley, Zimbabwe

== Railways ==
- Golden Valley line, a railway line in Wiltshire and Gloucestershire, England
- Golden Valley Light Railway, in Derbyshire, England
- Golden Valley Railway, in Hertfordshire, England

== Other uses ==
- Golden Valley (children's play), by Dorothy Hewett, 1981

== See also ==
- Golden Valley High School (disambiguation)
