= Mukore =

- Ward
- Interactive map of Mukore
- Coordinates: 20.130782°S 31.836090°E
- Country: Zimbabwe
- Province: Masvingo Province
- District: Bikita District

Population (2022)
  - Total: 6,410
- Time zone: UTC+2 (Central Africa Time)

Mukore is a ward in Bikita District of Masvingo Province in south-eastern Zimbabwe.

The area is served by Mukore Clinic.
