= Feock =

Feock may refer to:

- Feock, Cornwall, a village and civil parish south of Truro in Cornwall, United Kingdom
- Feock, Zimbabwe, a village in the province of Mashonaland West, Zimbabwe
