= Ngundu =

Coordinates: 19°59′S 31°33′E

Ngundu is a village in Chivi District in Masvingo Province in Zimbabwe, at the junction where the road to Chiredzi leaves the main Beitbridge to Masvingo road.

There is a police station, primary and secondary schools.
