= Nyika =

Nyika is a Swahili word meaning "bush" or "hinterland" (of the East African coast). More specifically, it can refer to:

- Mijikenda peoples, nine ethnic groups in coastal Kenya (also: Wanyika)
- Nyika language, a Bantu language of Tanzania and Zambia
- Nyika National Park, Malawi
- Nyika National Park, Zambia
- Nyika Plateau, Malawi and Zambia
- Nyiri Desert, Kenya
- Sabaki languages, Bantu languages of the Central East African coast
- Nyika Growth Point, Masvingo, Zimbabwe
