= Operation Excess (Rhodesia) =

- Part of the Rhodesian Bush War (or Second Chimurenga)
Date	27 July – 12 August 1968
Location	Mashonaland, Rhodesia
Result	Rhodesian victory

Belligerents
Rhodesia	ZIPRA

Commanders and leaders
(Rhodesia) Lt. Fanie Coetzee; Flt. Lt. Petter-Bowyer	Unknown

Units involved
Rhodesian Army; RLI; 2 Commando; 3 Commando; RAR; E Company; BSAP: RRAF; No.7 Squadron	Unknown

Strength
At least 150 to 200 Troops; 4 Alouette III (G-Cars); 1 DC-3C Dakota (Paradak)	30+

Casualties and losses
1 wounded	15 killed 8 captured 7 missing Total: 30

Operation Excess was a military operation launched by the Rhodesian Security Forces, on 27 July 1968, in response to an incursion of ZIPRA terrorists in Mashonaland West province.

== The Operation ==
The cadres were detected on 26 July when a Ministry of Internal Affairs (INTAF) employee discovered unfamiliar bootprints in the bush near Makuti. Joint Operations Command (JOC) was moved south-east to Karoi on 28 July, and 2 Commando was deployed there. 3 Commando was sent with Tactical HQ to patrol the Angwa River Bridge, to the north-east, near the border with Mozambique.

This squad was organised in five sections, three of eight men each and two of seven men each. Heading for Mount Darwin, about 150 kilometres (93 mi) north-east of Salisbury, their objective was to subvert local tribesmen and recruit some for training overseas.

The Support Group, which was already based up at Kanyemba, sent one of its troops into the area along with six Police Anti-Terrorist Unit (PATU) teams. E Company, RAR moved to the west to act as stops.

7 Troop, 2 Commando and the Support Group troop followed tracks to discover a vacant insurgent camp in the early morning on 28 July; the guerrillas had been made nervous by the increased helicopter activity north of their location and left. 13 Troop found fresh tracks the next morning and followed them. By the end of the operation, the insurgents had taken 23 casualties, 15 killed and 8 captured, for 1 Rhodesian soldier wounded.
