= Negovan =

Negovan may refer to:

- Negovan, Bulgaria, a village
  - Negovan Crag, a peak in Antarctica, named after the village
- Flampouro, Florina (Albanian: Negovan), a village in northern Greece
- Thomas Negovan (born 1971), American historian, musician and writer
- Papa Kristo Negovani (1875–1905), Albanian nationalist figure, born in Flampouro/Negovan
- Negovan Rajic, winner of the 1978 Prix du Cercle du livre de France

== See also ==
- Negovanovtsi, a village in northwestern Bulgaria
- Negovani, a village in Greece
- Negovano, a ward in south-eastern Zimbabwe
