= Melfort =

Melfort may refer to:

- Melfort, Saskatchewan, Canada
  - Melfort (electoral district), a former federal electoral district in Canada
  - Melfort (provincial electoral district), a provincial electoral district in Saskatchewan, Canada
  - Melfort Creek, a river in Saskatchewan, Canada
- Melfort, Zimbabwe

== See also ==
- Earl of Melfort
