= Headland (disambiguation) =

A headland is a point of land, usually high and often with a sheer drop, that extends out into a body of water.

Headland or Headlands may also refer to:

== Arts and entertainment ==
- headLand, an Australian television series
- Headland (band), an Australian musical collective headed by Murray Paterson

== Companies and organisations ==
- Headland Technology, a defunct American graphics hardware company
- Headlands Technologies, an American quantitative trading firm

== Places and buildings ==
- Headland, Alabama, a small city in the US
- Headland, Hartlepool, a civil parish in County Durham, UK
- The Headlands, a county park in Michigan
- Headlands Beach State Park, in Ohio, US
- Headlands Center for the Arts, in California, US
- Headlands, Zimbabwe, a village in the province of Manicaland, Zimbabwe
  - Headlands (constituency), a parliamentary constituency in Zimbabwe

== People ==
- Des Headland (born 1981), Australian rules footballer
- Leslye Headland (born 1980), American playwright, screenwriter, and director

== Other uses ==
- Headland (agriculture), the area at each end of a planted field used for turning farm machinery

== See also ==
- Port Hedland, Western Australia
- Headlander, 2016 video game
