= GVHS =

GVHS may refer to:

- Ganapathy Vilasam High School, an aided school in Koovappady, Ernakulam Dist, Kerala
- Garnet Valley High School, a public secondary school in Concord Township, Pennsylvania, United States
- Genesee Valley High School, a public secondary school in Belmont, New York, United States
- Golden Valley High School (disambiguation), various
- Grand Valley High School, a public secondary school in Orwell, Ohio, United States
- Green Valley High School, a public secondary school in Henderson, Nevada, United States
- Great Valley High School, a public secondary school in Malvern, Pennsylvania, United States
- Gypsy Vanner Horse Society, a registry for purebred Gypsy Vanner horses
