= Chatsworth, Zimbabwe =

Settlement in Masvingo Province, Zimbabwe

Coordinates: 19°38′S 30°50′E

Chatsworth is a small settlement in the Masvingo Province of Zimbabwe. It is located about 58 km north of Masvingo on the Masvingo-Gweru railway line. The settlement started in 1911 as a railway station. It administered under the Gutu Rural District Council.

== Name ==
The village was first called Makori, then Makowries and in 1919 renamed Chatsworth. Since independence in 1980, Chatsworth has grown from a rural settlement of 300 residents to one of over 1,000 residents (as of 2016). The most dramatic growth followed land reform in 2000.

== Location ==
Latitude 19.38S Longitude 030.51E Altitude 1365m /4478 ft (according to peg on railway line). It is located 280 km south of the capital Harare, 70 km North of the regional capital Masvingo by road and about 60 km by rail and 34 km west of the local authority location at Gutu.

== Transportation ==
A railway line passes from Masvingo to Gweru. The nearest airport is at Masvingo.

A public bus, commuter omnibuses, bicycle, ox-powered carts, but for distances less than 15 km, most people walk. The National Railways of Zimbabwe (NZR) stopped passing through Chatsworth around the year 2018.

The shops in the Makaure Township are built in a quadrangle, the middle of which serves as the local bus station. 5 minutes walk from that is the local railway station. The bus station also serves as the station for minibuses and lifts. Lifts are part and parcel of Zimbabwean means of travel. If you get a lift from any driver, expect to pay slightly higher than the bus rates. When in Zimbabwe, never, never travel alone in a car. It is not environmentally economic.

== Population ==
The hamlet itself has over 1000 residents. The areas around are sparsely populated mostly by subsistence farmers and semi-commercial farmers.

== Industry ==
The main industry around is farming. All other activities at Chatsworth are there mainly to support farming. The soil in the area is not good enough for growing crops but is more suitable for cattle ranching. Well-paid employees get on average US$500 per month.

The main employer at Chatsworh is the Zimbabwe Republic Police. Chatsworth has an unusually large police station for a hamlet that size. The reason for that is the station serves a very wide sparsely populated rural area. Crime is traditionally very low.

== Health provision ==
A well-staffed clinic was built at Chatsworth during the late 1980s to provide primary health care to Chatsworth and its surrounding areas. Of late it has suffered the same shortages of medicines as other clinics and hospitals in the country, but it continues to serve its community well. The main cause of death in the area is HIV, which has claimed the lives of many during the last decade.

== Education ==
- Two primary schools at Chatsworth (Chatsworth and Gert Nel). Chatsworth is too small to have two schools, they were built during the time when blacks and whites were not allowed to mix in schools. Now the two schools serve the new farmers settled round the growth point.
- Rufaro High School about 4g km to the north.
- Nyashenje Bath Primary & Secondary Schools; to the north
- Kanongovere High School
- Progressive College
- Serima Mission School about 20 km to the north east
- Makomba Secondary School about 15 km to the south
- Marongere Primary School sharing grounds with Makomba
- St Theresa Primary School about 12 km south west
- St Frances Secondary School about 15 km south-west.
- Chiriga Primary and Secondary School
- Gert Nel Primary School
- Chatsworth Primary School
- Chatsworth Secondary School sharing grounds with Chatsworth Primary

=== Literacy rates ===
Literacy rates remain high at over 90%. Most people speak at least two languages including English, so that a traveller is never lost. However, because the local language, Shona, is a fast language, people speak English just as fast and that may cause visitors some initial difficulty.

== Residential suburbs ==
The first residential village to be built at Chatsworth was probably the Railway worker's village. Because of the then segregation rules between blacks and whites, the village was built in two parts. The pre-fabricated corrugated tin two roomed shacks to the east of the railway line for black workers, and the large houses for white workers to the west of the railway line. The brick houses are still there, and still owned by the railways, but the shacks have been replaced by small two roomed houses, mostly owned by private residents.

Makaure Township: developed as more and more non-railway workers arrived to work in businesses serving the settlement. These included shops, the transport sector, the cattle farming sector, etc. Makaure Township later included the area formally belonging to the black railway workers. All of it comprised small houses, most of which did not have electricity till the early 1980s. They were all which meant for black people during the colonial era.

Chatsworth Suburb, formerly for whites only during colonial times, is situated about a mile out of town and those travelling through Chatsworth can easily miss it. The suburb has much bigger houses and the residents are generally much more affluent than those in Makaure Township.

== Water sources ==
Successive droughts have affected the local habitat and local economy. The area used to be a big producer of fruits such as mangoes, guavas, peaches, and wild fruits. Most of these fruit trees have died during droughts, and have been difficult to replace.

In normal circumstances each rural family has its own well or there is a communal well. These tend to dry up during the frequent droughts that affect Zimbabwe. For Chatsworth itself, the piped water comes from Munyambe Dam a few km east along the Gutu Road. The dam is large enough to supply Chatsworth even during droughts. The water from a well is always the best water and does not require purification. Most wells are covered up so that nothing has access to the water. Recently there has been an effort to encourage people to consider other sources of water, including storing rainwater in underground tanks (prohibitively expensive) and recycling water.

== Fauna ==
Hare, buck, snakes, monkeys, a wide variety of birds such as (doves, owls, brown eagles, king fishers, swallows, etc.), locusts, and others. Domestic animals are mainly cattle, donkeys, and some sheep. Goats do not thrive.

== Foods ==
Local diet consists of a variety of foodstuffs as listed below. The main difference between European food and Zimbabwean rural food is the amount of meat in the diet. Rural Zimbabwe consumes a lot less meat. They also eat more fresh foods and fruit. The main challenge in rural Zimbabwe is food preservation. Most food is produced during one or other season and needs to be preserved so that it is available throughout the year. New and cheap methods of increasing the efficiency of preservation are always welcome to locals.

- Sadza made from maize meal, rapocco meal or sorghum meal is the staple diet
- Vegetables such as can be grown in the garden. You will notice each family grows its own and they pick only when they need.
- Meat such as chicken, beef, lamb, and game. Most families keep their own chickens.
- Fruit: there is a wide variety of fruit such as mangoes, guavas, oranges, lemons, apples, etc., and some wild fruit which, like any other fruit are seasonal.
