= Eastnor =

Eastnor may refer to:

- Eastnor, Herefordshire, England
  - Eastnor Castle, near Eastnor, Herefordshire
- Eastnor Township, Ontario
- Eastnor (Zimbabwe)
