= Negovanhu =

Negovanhu Negovano
- Ward
- Interactive map of Negovanhu
- Coordinates: 20.128995°S 31.726067°E
- Country: Zimbabwe
- Province: Masvingo Province
- District: Bikita District

Population (2022)
  - Total: 6,376
- Time zone: UTC+2 (Central Africa Time)

Negovanhu is a ward in Bikita District of Masvingo Province in south-eastern Zimbabwe.

The ward is served by Negovanhu clinic.
