= Kariyangwe =

Settlement in Matabeleland North Province

Coordinates: 17°58′S 27°30′E

Kariyangwe is a settlement in Matabeleland North, Zimbabwe and is located about 60 km south of Binga village. The settlement grew up around the Kariyangwe Mission, the first to be set up by Spanish missionaries that arrived in the country in 1949. The people are Matonga. Originally, the people lived at the bank of the river Zambezi. When the Kariba Dam was built in the 1950s, people were resettled to the current region.

As of 2019, in the area of Kariynagwe there live about 10,000 people. It has a mission hospital operated by sisters without a permanent medical doctor available. The hospital has two off-grid photovoltaic systems to ensure basic electric supply. Education is provided by primary and secondary school. A more or less regular bus is connecting Kariynagwe to Binga and Hwange.

Since May 2018 there is no public electric power supply. About 2 km of copper cable were stolen and not replaced up to now (2019).

The area has an irrigation scheme which gets its water supply from the Lungwalaala Dam.

== Kariyangwe Mission Primary School ==
The mission has its own primary school. As of 2019, about 840 students are attending school. The school provides several class rooms, a library, a new kindergarten, school kitchen an accommodation for teaching staff.

The school and pupils are supported by an Austrian non-profit organisation called PFAU (Note: web site of non-profit organisation PFAU) since 2010. The organisation supports students in need with school fees and realises different projects. Since the start of the cooperation, a borehole, school garden, kindergarten building and school kitchen were built. Kindergarten and school kitchen were planned and built in full activity of pupils and teachers of technical high school Pinkafeld, Austria. In 2021, a photovoltaic system with battery system was installed on site. Therewith, it was possible to provide a minimum of electric supply for basic needs such as light, communication and fridges.

Also a nutrition program was established to provide a regular meal to all students. Therefore, local farmers are contracted to deliver there harvest to school. With this initiative farmers have a fix income every year and local economy gets strengthened. This nutrition program is generously supported by Red Charity (Note: web site of Red Charity).

One kilometer away from the primary school is a High school (Kumagobbo) accommodating form 1 to 6 which was built with help of community participation after independence. Since then neighbouring primary schools has been sending pupils for higher education. The school often receives students from other areas within the region, to name a few Siasyundu, Siachilaba, Gwatagwata, Lusulu. Kariangwe High is known of having very good pass rates within the region and evidenced with its byproducts. A large number of professionals within Binga have been influenced or attended school at Kariangwe High school.

Kariangwe has agricultural officers and offers Vet services located across Siansali homestead looking after community livestock through proving vaccination for mainly cows. Concerning wildlife, Kariangwe is about 10 kms away from Cizalila game and can be guaranteed of seeing wild animals including the big five along Simbungwe river. The river has act as catchment area as it provides water to wildlife throughout the year. Wildlife is protected by campfire from illegal hunting of animals.
