= Chibwedziva =

Place in Masvingo Province, Zimbabwe

Chibwedziva is a place in Chiredzi District, Masvingo Province, Zimbabwe. Almost 99% of the inhabitants are Tsonga Shangaan people.

It has a secondary school.
