= Zakka (disambiguation) =

Zakka (from the Japanese 'kak-ka in de zak-ka'（雑貨）or 'many things') is a fashion and design phenomenon that has spread from Japan throughout Asia.

Zakka may also refer to:

- Ignatius Zakka I Iwas (1933–2014), 122nd Syriac Orthodox Patriarch of Antioch and All the East and, as such, Supreme Head of the Universal Syriac Orthodox Church from 1980 to 2014
- Henry Zakka (born 1956), Venezuelan actor and director
- Nizar Zakka, a Lebanese information technology expert and advocate of Internet freedom

== See also ==
- Zaka (disambiguation)
