= Nyika Growth Point =

Administrative centre of Bikita, Zimbabwe

Nyika Growth Point is a growth point located in Bikita District, Masvingo Province, Zimbabwe. It is the administrative centre of Bikita District. The growth point is located at 85km peg from Masvingo along the A9 highway to Mutare.

== Education ==
There are two schools in Nyika growth point, Gwindingwi secondary school and Gumunyu primary school

== Health ==
There is one government funded clinic in Nyika. Complex issues are referred to Bikita Rural Hospital, which is 10 km away from Nyika, which is government owned or to Silveira Mission Hospital, which is Catholic-run some 20 km away. There are 2 privately owned surgeries which operate in Nyika. 2 pharmacies are located in the growth point and serve clients from all over Bikita District. One of the pharmacies is Nitt Pharmacy.
