= Devure Ranch =

Protected area in Zimbabwe

- Savé Valley Conservancy
- Interactive map of Devure Ranch
- Location: Bikita District, Zimbabwe.
- Nearest city: Masvingo
- Coordinates: 20.131080°S 32.105643°E
- Area: 3,442 km^{2} (1,329 sq mi)
- Established: 1991
- Governing body: Savé Valley Conservancy Community Trust

Devure Ranch is a protected area in Bikita District of Masvingo Province in south-eastern Zimbabwe, making up the major part of the Savé Valley Conservancy, itself part of the Great Limpopo Transfrontier Park.
