= Ezra Chadzamira =

Zimbabwean politician

The Honourable Ezra Chadzamira MP

Minister of State for Provincial Affairs and Devolution for Masvingo
- Incumbent
- Assumed office 10 September 2018
- President: Emmerson Mnangagwa
- Preceded by: Josiah Hungwe

Member of Parliament for Masvingo West
- Incumbent
- Assumed office 22 August 2013
- President: Emmerson Mnangagwa
- Preceded by: Mharadza Tachiona
- Majority: 1,014 (5.1%)

Personal details
- Born: 12 February 1965 (age 61)
- Party: ZANU-PF

Ezra Ruvai Chadzamira is a Zimbabwean politician and member of the Zimbabwe African National Union-Patriotic Front (ZANU-PF) party. He has had a remarkable career in politics, spanning over two decades, and has made significant contributions to the development of his country.

== Background ==
=== Early life ===
Ezra Chadzamira was born on 12 February 1965, in Masvingo, Zimbabwe. He grew up in a family of farmers and was raised with a strong work ethic and commitment to community service. His parents instilled in him the importance of education and hard work, values that would shape his future career path.

=== Education ===
Chadzamira attended primary school in Masvingo and secondary school in Harare. He was an exceptional student and developed a keen interest in economics and development studies. After completing his secondary education, he attended the University of Zimbabwe, where he earned a bachelor's degree in economics. He later pursued a master's degree in development studies from the University of the West of England, further enhancing his knowledge and skills in development economics.

=== Political career ===
Chadzamira's political career began in 1995, when he was elected to the Zimbabwean Parliament as a member of the ZANU-PF party. He represented the constituency of Masvingo West and quickly made a name for himself as a vocal advocate for rural development. In 2000, he was appointed Minister of State for Masvingo Province, a position he held until 2005. During his tenure, he implemented various initiatives aimed at improving infrastructure and healthcare in the province.

In 2013, Chadzamira was re-elected to Parliament and served as the Chairperson of the Portfolio Committee on Women's Affairs, Gender, and Community Development. He has also held various leadership positions within the ZANU-PF party, including serving as the Secretary for Women's Affairs.

==== Other occupations ====
In addition to his political career, Chadzamira has worked as a development consultant and has experience in non-governmental organization management. He has also served on the boards of various organizations focused on rural development and women's empowerment, including the Zimbabwe Women's Resource Centre and the Community Development Trust.

== Accolades ==
Chadzamira's accolades include:

- Zimbabwean Parliament's Award for Outstanding Leadership (2010)
- African Union's Award for Women's Rights Advocacy (2015)
- Nominee for the Zimbabwean of the Year Award (2018)

== Personal life ==
Chadzamira is married to a businesswoman and has two children. He is a devout Christian.

== Allegations ==
Chadzamira has faced criticism and allegations of corruption related to his political activities and management of government funds. In 2018, he was accused of embezzling funds intended for rural development projects, but he denied any wrongdoing and was not charged. Despite these allegations, Chadzamira remains a prominent figure in Zimbabwean politics and continues to advocate for rural development and women's empowerment.
