= Felixburg =

Village in Zimbabwe

Coordinates: 19°26′10″S 30°50′40″E

Felixburg is a village in the Masvingo Province of Zimbabwe. It is located about 53 km (33 mi) north of Masvingo on the road that connects Gutu to Chivhu. It was named after Felix Posselt who visited the area in 1888 and later settled at Felixburg.

Felixburg is also a mining area, where the Zimbabwe government plans to develop a gold service centre.
