= Mushumbi Pools =

Coordinates: 16°10′01″S 30°34′25″E

Mushumbi Pools is a village and business centre in Mbire District, north of Guruve in Mashonaland Central province in Zimbabwe. The village is named after a series of pools in and adjacent to the Manyame River.

During the Second Chimurenga, villagers from the surrounding areas, and also from Kanyemba, were moved to a protected village along the Dande river by Rhodesian Security Forces. The village was the site of a battle between ZIPRA guerillas and the Rhodesian army in the late 1970s. After the end of the war, there was a ZIPRA demobilisation camp at Mushumbi Pools, where in March 1981 3 Zimbabwe National Army soldiers were killed in a conflict with ZIPRA men.
