= Zaka =

ZAKA is an Israeli emergency response organisation.

Zaka may also refer to:

== Places ==
=== Burkina Faso ===
- Zaka, Gounghin, a village in Gounghin Department, Kouritenga Province
- Zaka, Tenkodogo, a village in Tenkodogo Department, Boulgou Province

=== Iran ===
- Zaka, Iran, a village in Khuzestan Province

=== Zimbabwe ===
- Zaka District
- Zaka (Senatorial constituency), roughly congruent with Zaka District

== See also ==
- Zakka (disambiguation)
