= Queen's Mine =

Village in Matabeleland North, Zimbabwe

Coordinates: 19.802°S 28.752°E

Queen's Mine is a village in Matabeleland North, Zimbabwe and is located about 55 km north-east of Bulawayo along the Bulawayo-Eastnor road.

The village grew up around the Queen's Mine, which was originally pegged on the site of ancient diggings in 1893, and is currently operated by Duration Gold.

It derived its name from the nearby Ndebele queen's kraal.
