= Bikita mine =

Lithium mine in Zimbabwe

Coordinates: 19.9572°S 31.4360°E

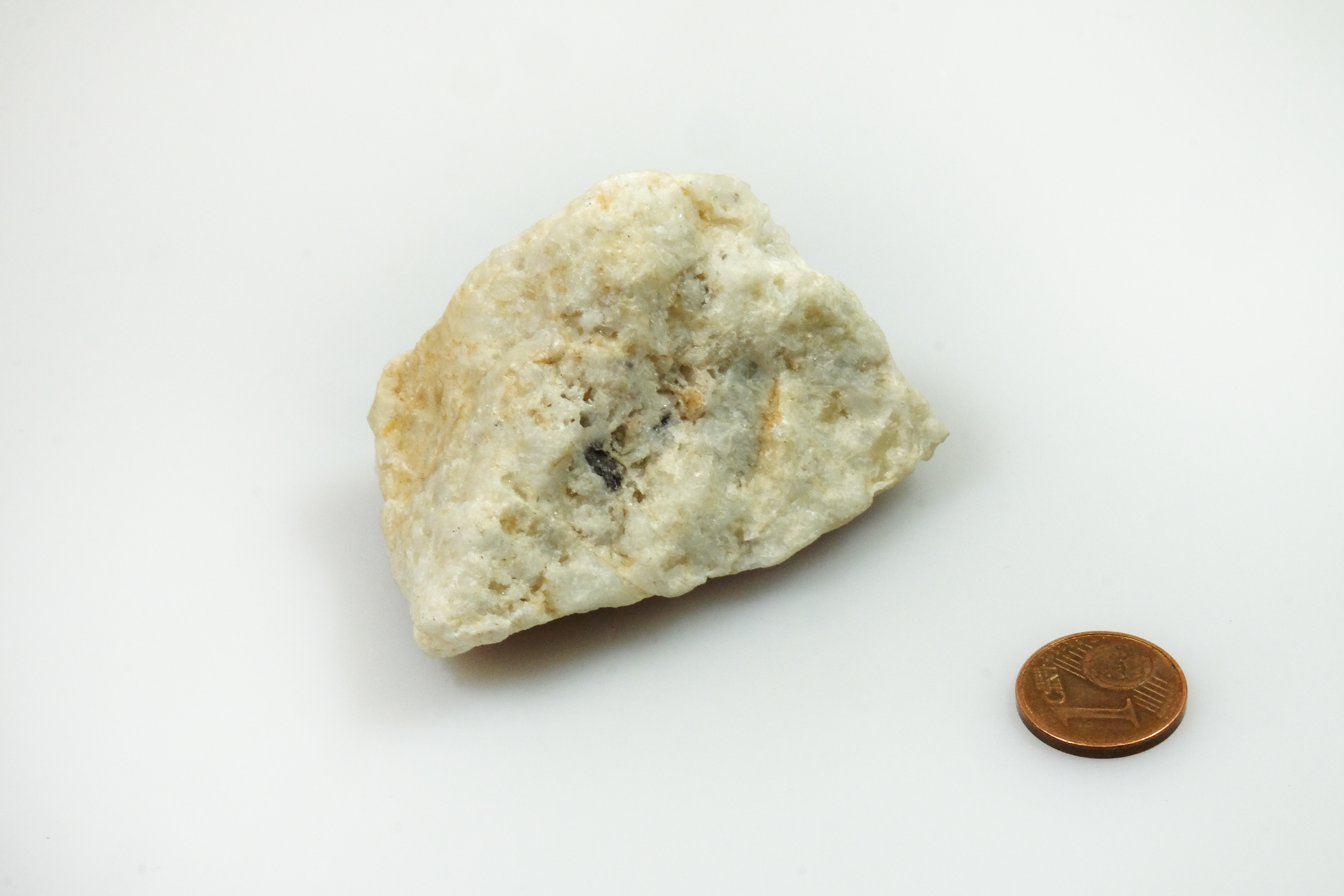
- Bikitaite
- Interactive map of Bikita mine
- Location: Masvingo Province, Zimbabwe
- Products: Lithium

The Bikita mine is the largest lithium mine in Zimbabwe. The privately owned company holds the world’s largest-known deposit of lithium at approximately 11 million tonnes. The mine is located in southern Zimbabwe in Masvingo Province. The Bikita mine has reserves amounting to 10.8 million tonnes of lithium ore grading 1.4% lithium thus resulting 0.15 million tonnes of lithium.

In June 2022 the Sinomine Resource Group company bought the Bikita mine for $200 million.
