= Shinga, Zimbabwe =

Coordinates: 17°00′05″S 032°25′27″E

Shinga (Shanga) is a village in the Ngarwe communal lands of Mudzi District, Mashonaland East Province, Zimbabwe. The population is about 100 and consists mainly of subsistence farmers. The community has a school and a clinic. It gives its name to a ward of the Mudzi West constituency.
