= Mupandawana =

Mpandawana Mpandawana
- Location of Mpandawana
- Coordinates: 19°38′12″S 031°10′06″E
- Country: Zimbabwe
- Region: Midlands
- Province: Masvingo
- District: Gutu
- Elevation: 1,398 m (4,587 ft)

Population
  - Total: 30,000
- Time zone: UTC+2 (CAT)

Mpandawana is a town and the largest service centre in Gutu, Zimbabwe. In the early years of independent Zimbabwe's economic planning, Mpandawana was designated as a "growth point". By 2012 the settlement had a population of over 30,000 and, in 2014, was granted town status.

== Infrastructure ==
The centre has a post office, shops banking services, schools and a hospital, but there is no resident medical doctor. There are paved streets, including the main east-west road through the settlement. Mpandawana has electricity. Water for the town is supplied from Mushaviri dam. Mpandawana has several residential suburbs, namely Old Location, Tompsky, Hwiru (United Nations), Gonvill, Western suburbs and the newest development, Chomfuli low density suburb.

== Education ==
Gutu United Primary School
Hwiru Primary School
Mpandawana High School
Gutu Vocational Training Centre
Shain Primary School

== Administration offices ==
Mupandawana Town Council
Magistrates Court
Ministry of Education offices
Gutu Post Office
Mpandawana Post Office
