= Sanyatwe =

Coordinates: 18°22′S 32°36′E

Sanyatwe is a small commercial centre in the Nyanga area in the province of Manicaland, Zimbabwe. It is located 63 km north east of Rusape and the agriculture in the surrounding area is devoted to growing fruit. It was once a thriving business point before the horticultural and tourism industries were negatively affected by the land reform program in 2000. The Brondesbury Hotel, which used to be popular in the 1980s is located near the centre.
