= Zaka District =

- District
- Ndanga District
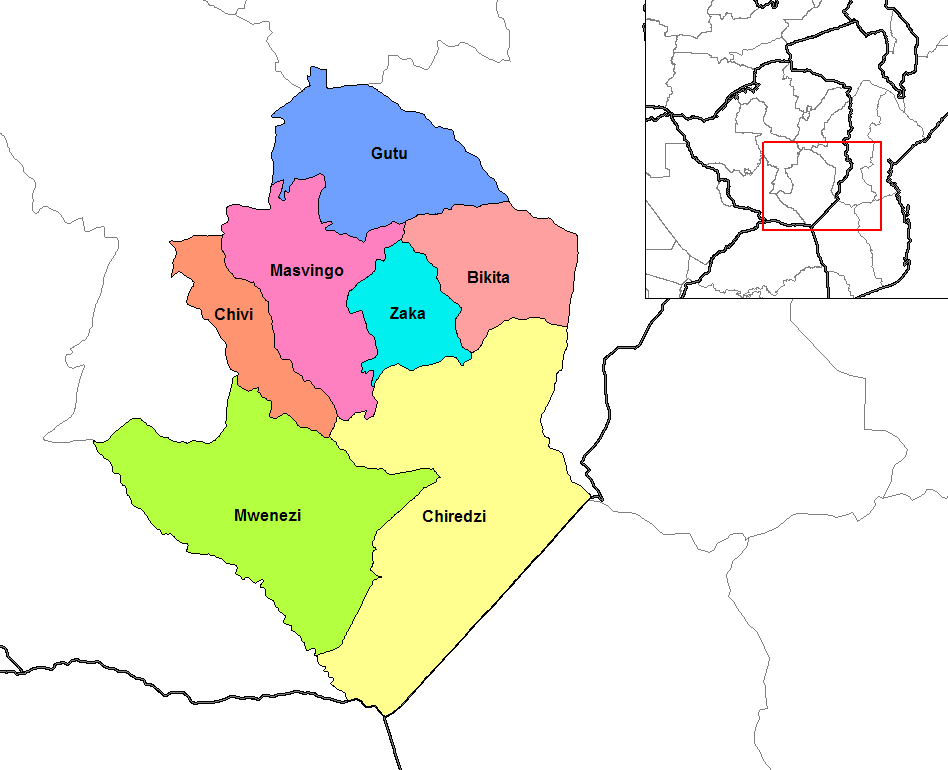
- Districts of Masvingo province

- Masvingo constituency seats for the 2008, showing the division of Zaka (District)
- Coordinates: 20°05′S 31°37′E
- Country: Zimbabwe
- Province: Masvingo
- District: Zaka

Government
  - Type: Rural Council

Area
  - Land: 3,126 km^{2} (1,207 sq mi)

Population (2022 Census)
  - Total: 198,889
  - Density: 63.62/km^{2} (164.8/sq mi)
- Time zone: UTC+2 (CAT)

Zaka is a district in Masvingo Province, Zimbabwe, located 86 km southeast of Masvingo. Old administration offices were at Ndanga communal (Chimutarara) township before being moved to its current location, Zaka Business Centre. Among its schools are St. Anthony's High School, Jichidza Mission, Rudhanda High School, and Wasarawapata High School.

The Moyos descendants of Pfupajena and Va Mhepo are the traditional leaders:

- Bota: Moyo stretches from Jerera Growth Point to Chiredzi Town in the South and Renco mine is in the West, Chief Nhema Moyo in the West Bordering with the Bikita District.
- Nhema: Moyo who is identified with his roots in Duma hill in Bikita is referred as Muduma.
- Nyakunhuwa: Shumba who served as the Moyos general chiefdom spreads Northwest Up to the Great Zimbabwe.
- Ndanga: Gumbo totem of Chinemukutu an uncle to the Moyos clan in the North.
