= Venice, Zimbabwe =

Coordinates: 18°30′12″S 29°46′36″E

Venice is a village in the province of Mashonaland West, Zimbabwe. It is located about 30 km south-east of Kadoma. According to the 1982 Population Census, the village had a population of 3,306. The village grew up as a residential and commercial centre for the Venice gold mine, which reopened in 2019 after years of not operating.
