= Gwede =

Gwede is an African given name and surname. Notable people with the name include:

- Gwede Mantashe (born 1955), South African politician
- Focus Gwede (died 2011), head of Malawi Police Force
