= Lonely Mine =

Village in Zimbabwe

Coordinates: 19°30′S 28°45′E

Lonely Mine is a village in Matabeleland North, Zimbabwe and is located about 84 kilometres (52 mi) north-east of Bulawayo, just north of Inyati. It was established in 1906 when gold was discovered in the area. Gold, nickel and tungsten are still mined in the area today.
