= Tandaai =

Coordinates: 19°36′S 32°48′E

Tandaai is a village in the province of Manicaland, Zimbabwe located 10 km south east of Cashel in the Eastern Highlands. It serves as a small trading centre for a forestry and mix farming area.
