= Marinoha =

Marinoha is a village in the Kezi district in Zimbabwe. It stretches from the Mazakela River near Mabonyane Shopping Center up to Mhabhinyane river in the south. The Marinoha primary school is located there, but it was forced to shut down (see references). In the 1950s and 60s it was the only school that went up to standard 6 (grade 8) within a radius of 17 to 20km. One of the prominent and long serving headmaster of the school was Mr JD Zondo who was also a staunch member of the UCCSA which owned and ran the school.

== Bibliography ==
- "War Veterans Ban Satellite Dishes in Mat South" by Nqobani Ndlovu, 24 May 2008.
