= Umsweswe =

Village in Zimbabwe

Coordinates: 18°27′S 29°49′E

Umsweswe is a village in the province of Mashonaland West, Zimbabwe. It is located about 18 km south-west of Kadoma.

The village shares its name with the Umsweswe River and the Umsweswe mine.
