= Towla =

Human settlement in Zimbabwe

Coordinates: 21°26′S 29°54′E

Towla is a village located in Matabeleland South Province, Zimbabwe, about 90 kilometers north of Beitbridge. It presently serves as the Headquarters of the Bubye Valley Conservancy, believed to be the largest private wildlife reserve in the world.

Towla was established by Liebig Extract of Meat Company (Lemco, later acquired by Unilever) as the headquarters for their Jopembi cattle ranch, then one of the largest cattle ranches in the World. It was subsequently sold to a consortium of international investors and the cattle were removed to make way for re-establishment of the indigenous wildlife populations. The ranches were converted into the existing Bubye Valley Conservancy on which Mazunga Safaris operates hunting safaris.

Bubye Valley Conservancy is owned by shareholders based in USA, UK etc
