= Blanket Mine =

Mine in Zimbabwe

Coordinates: 20°51′36.78″S 28°54′36.80″E

Location of BlanketMine

Blanket Mine is a village and mine in the province of Matabeleland South, Zimbabwe. It is located about 15 km north-west of Gwanda and 140 km south of Bulawayo. The village grew up around the eponymous gold mine and provides a residential and commercial centre. Its population at the time of the 1982 census was 1,346 people.

The mine was established in 1904 at the north-west end of the Gwanda Greenstone Belt. Gold had previously been mined on an artisanal basis but was industrialised by the Matabele Reefs and Estate Company, which operated the mine until 1911 when it was sold to Forbes Rhodesia Syndicate. It apparently ceased operations after 1916, but resumed in 1941 under a new owner, F.D.A. Payne. The Canadian mine company Falconbridge Ltd. took it over in 1964 and ran it until 1993, producing over 500,000 ounces of gold from 4 million tons of ore. It was sold to Kinross Gold, which produced another 400,000 ounces of gold from 2.4 million tons over the following 12 years.

The current mine operator and minority interest owner is the Jersey-based Caledonia Mining Corporation, which acquired the Blanket Mine from Kinross Gold Corporation in April 2006. Economic instability in Zimbabwe forced the temporary suspension of mining operations until mid-2009. The company subsequently embarked on a major series of expansions from 2010 to 2017, costing over $50 million, which have annually increased production capacity from around 24,000 ounces to around 40,000 ounces. Yields are expected to reach around 75–80,000 ounces per year by 2021.

Following the implementation of a government-mandated indigenization plan, completed on September 5, 2012, Caledonia Mining retained a 49% ownership interest in the Blanket mine. Majority ownership of the mine is divided between four parties: 16% is owned by the National Indigenisation and Economic Empowerment Fund; 10% by a Management and Employee Trust for the benefit of the present and future managers and employees of Blanket; 15% by identified indigenous Zimbabweans; and 10% by the Blanket Gwanda Community Trust. In 2019, in their September investor presentation, under the heading "Unwinding of Indigenization", Caledonia Mining announced a proposed increase in the company's shareholding in the Blanket Mine, from 49% to 64% when local partners "flip-up" from ownership in Blanket to a shareholding in Caledonia.
