= Tizvione =

Village in Manicaland province, Zimbabwe

Coordinates: 19.042350°S 31.589856°E

Tizvione is a village in the north of Buhera District, Manicaland province of Zimbabwe.
