= Fumukwe =

Coordinates: 21°27.75′S 29°3′E

Location of Fumukwe

Fumukwe is a village in Manama ward the province of Matabeleland South, Zimbabwe. It is located south of Gwanda on the road to Manama. The village is a small commercial centre. The Thuli River runs just west of the town.

Villagers in Fumukwe manage the community's water through a series of informal and formal means. The arrangements of open wells can present danger. In 2015, the village gained headlines when a two-year-old child fell into a 12-metre well and was rescued by his mother.
