= Rocky Spruit =

Human settlement in Zimbabwe

Coordinates: 18°19′S 31°08′E

Rocky Spruit is a village in the province of Mashonaland East, Zimbabwe. It is located on the Mupfure River in the Chiota communal land about 50 kilometres (31 mi) south of Harare.

Rocky Spruit is a farm and is located in Mashonaland Central Province, Zimbabwe. The estimate terrain elevation above sea level is 1125 meters.
