= Gumira =

Human settlement in Zimbabwe

- Village
- Location in Zimbabwe
- Coordinates: 20.603°S 32.281°E
- Country: Zimbabwe
- Province: Manicaland Province
- District: Chipinge District
- Time zone: UTC+2 (CAT)

Gumira is a village in the Chipinge district of Manicaland, Zimbabwe, halfway between Chipinge and Chiredzi.

In 2015, it was one of many villages in Chipinge badly affected by drought, leading to starvation and death of cattle. Cattle in Gumira have also been killed by lions.
