= Josiah Hungwe =

Zimbabwean politician

Provincial Governor Minister for Masvingo Province

Personal details
- Party: ZANU–PF

Josiah Hungwe is a Zimbabwean politician. He served as a Provincial Governor Minister for Masvingo Province of Zimbabwe, as well as a member of parliament. He is a member of ZANU–PF.
