= Muriel, Zimbabwe =

Settlement in Mashonaland West, Zimbabwe

Coordinates: 17°14′S 30°36′E

Muriel, Zimbabwe is a settlement in Mashonaland West province in Zimbabwe. Its located in the Zvimba District near Mutorashanga. The settlement is known for the Muriel Mine, a gold mine in the district.

== Geography ==
Muriel lies at an elevation of approximately 1,264 metres.

== Mining ==
Muriel is associated with the nearby Muriel mine. Historical reports indicate gold, silver and copper production occurred from the mine. Recent renovations have increased gold output and extended lifespan.
