= Jotsholo =

Coordinates: 18.72°S 27.56°E

Jotsholo is a small town in the Lupane district in the province of Matabeleland North, Zimbabwe.
