= Manhenga =

Coordinates: 17.397°S 31.310°E

Manhenga is a village in Bindura District of Mashonaland Central province in Zimbabwe, located between the Nyaure and Serere rivers.
