= Wilton, Zimbabwe =

Village in Mashonaland East, Zimbabwe

Coordinates: 18°24′S 31°46′E

Wilton is a village in the province of Mashonaland East, Zimbabwe. It is located about 35 km south of Marondera. It serves as a commercial centre for the Svosve communal land, and is the location of the Wilton pump station on the Petrozim petroleum product pipeline to Msasa in Harare.
