= Chivi District =

Chivi Chibi
- District
- Motto: Kubatana kwakanaka
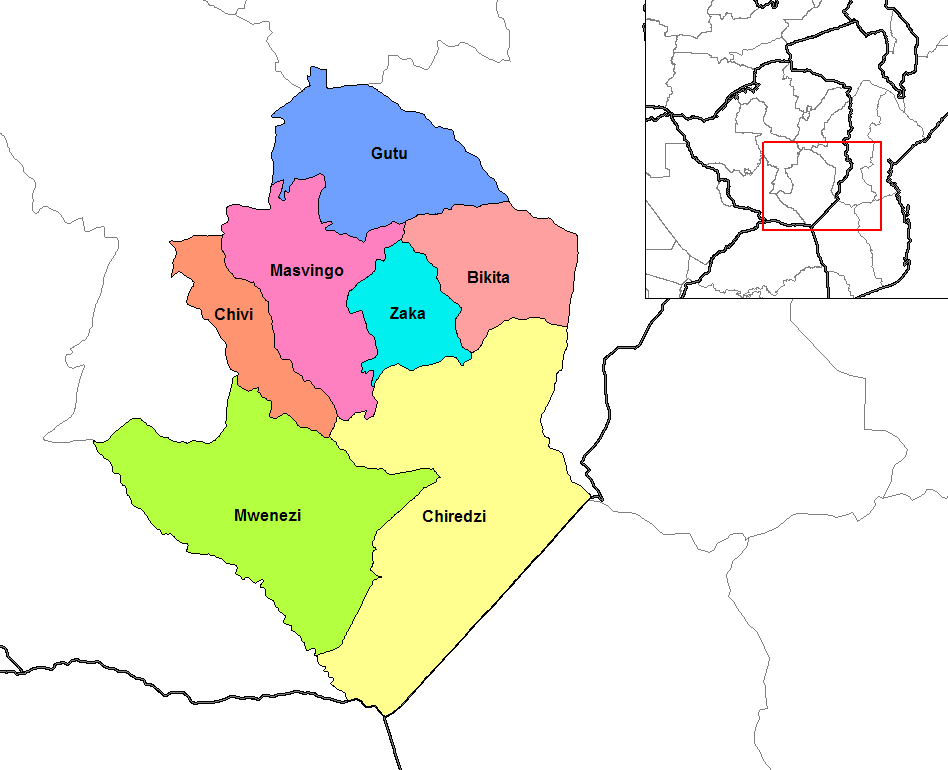
- Districts of Masvingo province

- Masvingo constituency seats for the 2008, showing the division of Chivi (District)
- Coordinates: 20°05′S 31°37′E
- Country: Zimbabwe
- Province: Masvingo
- District: Chivi

Government
  - Type: Rural Council
  - Chairman of Rural District Council: Killer Zivhu
  - Member of Senate: Josiah Hungwe,

Area
  - Total: 3,543 km^{2} (1,368 sq mi)

Population (2022 Census)
  - Total: 172,979
  - Density: 48.82/km^{2} (126.5/sq mi)
- Time zone: UTC+2 (CAT)

Chivi, originally known as Chibi, is a district in the Masvingo Province of Zimbabwe. The area was originally established as a mission station in 1894 by the Berlin Missionary Society under the name Chibi Mission.

== Education ==
=== Prominent Schools ===
The district also has many Missionary schools: chibi high school, Berejena mission high school, Nyaningwe (St Luke's) High School and other smaller day secondary schools.

== Geography ==
Chivi is located in a semi-arid area and occupies an area of 3,510 km^{2} north of Mwenezi (District) and west of Masvingo (District). The district is situated in the drought-prone region of the country with an average rainfall of 450 mm per year.

== Demographics ==
Chivi is inhabited by the Karanga people, who are a subgroup of the Shona tribe. Much of the district is occupied by subsistence farmers.

== Government and politics ==
The district sends three members to Zimbabwe's House of Assembly. Each of the wards in the district has an elected official who works at the rural district council.

The district was divided into three sections for the 2008 elections, namely north, central and south. The district has been a stronghold of ZANU-PF since independence in 1980. The current Chairman of the Rural District Council is Killer zivhu whilst the Senator for the area is Josiah Hungwe both of the ZANU–PF party.

=== Muzvidziwa Village (Gongwa) ===
Despite being one of the oldest villages in the district, Gongwa is facing extinction from the massive spread of the growth point. Established in the early 1960s, the villagers witnessed the first and second Chimurenga (war against the white settlers). Starting from the Western hills the village stretches more than 20 hectares to the East. Half of the village has been cut to provide the land for the growth point. In 2000, most of the villagers were moved to various places after the land reform program provided land for them, however conflict among the remaining villagers and the District Council raised as the council did not have enough funds for the relocation of the villagers. The school was built by some Mujibhas to provide education to their children.

=== Chivi South ===
Manyiwa village falls under chiefs Nemauzhe Mutau, Zinhumwe, Donono, Mukanga, Tumburai, Zivuku, Runesu, Maringire, and others.

The Member of Parliament for Chivi South as of 2023 is Saul Maburutse of ZANU PF. To note some schools Chamanhanzva High School, Neruvanga, Chasiyatende, Berejena Mission High School and Magwari Primary School

=== Chivi Central ===
The Member of House of Assembly for the area is Maoneke Exavier of the ZANU–PF party .Village heads: Madhigi village Freddie Madhigi/Madigi Under Chief Chimhamhiwa. Vurayayi (Gwede) Village under chief Chipindu just to name a few

=== Chivi North ===
Is the area including Chivi Growth Point whose current Member of Parliament as of 2023 is Mukungurugwa Huruva Godfrey of the ZANU–PF party.

== Education ==
=== Nyaningwe High School ===
The school is the second largest and at the growth point. Nyaningwe was established in 2001 by a local catholic priest, Father Guido Zannet as a missionary school to curb walking distance crisis to access secondary education at nearby Chibi Mission, Tambudzai and Chinembiri secondary schools are at least 8 km (5 mi) from the growth point. In 2015, the school had over 700 students, in form 1 to 4 classes and A level offering commercials and Arts. Most events are held at the Nyaningwe High school Hall which is the largest in the district.
