= Mazunga =

Coordinates: 21°44′S 29°52′E

- Village
- Interactive map of Mazunga
- Country: Zimbabwe
- Province: Matabeleland South
- District: Beitbridge District

Mazunga is a village in the Beitbridge District in the province of Matabeleland South, Zimbabwe. It is a station on the Beitbridge Bulawayo Railway.
