= Tswiza =

Coordinates: 21°49′S 31°34′E

Tswiza is a village in the province of Masvingo, Zimbabwe. It is located about 25km north of Sango in the Gonarezhou National Park on the railway line that links Gweru to Maputo in Mozambique.
