= Charara =

Rural area in Kariba District, Zimbabwe

Coordinates: 16°33′34″S 28°57′45″E

Charara is a tourist and agricultural area on the shoreline of Lake Kariba, east of Kariba Town in Kariba (District) in Zimbabwe. There are several tourist accommodation facilities, including the National Anglers’ Union of Zimbabwe site, which hosts the annual Kariba Invitational Tiger Fishing Tournament. There is also a plantation which produces bananas and vegetables.
