= Marira =

Village in Midlands, Zimbabwe

Marira is a village on the outskirts of Shurugwi in the Midlands Province of Zimbabwe. It is roughly 25 km southeast of Shurugwi, southeast from the A18.

In 2018, Marira villagers came into conflict with the proposed Chachacha Growth Point that would have evicted them and demolished their homes. The Tongogara Rural District Council claimed that the council had given the villagers eviction notices and their complaints were null and void as the land belonged to the council itself. There have also been tensions between the residents of the Donga suburbs of Shurugwi, near the Chachacha Growth Point, who accused Marira villagers of sabotaging and vandalizing their water supply.

The village includes the Marira Zhombe Primary School, which is used as a polling station for parliamentary elections. The Marira Clinic was built as part of the Zvishavane Community Share Ownership Trust's board decision to promote health care services and facilities in the surrounding area.
