= Gurajena =

Zimbabwean village

Gurajena is a village in Masvingo District, Zimbabwe. It is located about 60 km north east of Masvingo. It is one of the oldest growth points in the areas.

There village is served by several primary schools Mavhiringidze Secondary School, and Gurajena Hospital.

It was named after Chief Gurajena whose chieftainship which was reduced to Headman during the colonial era. There were several villages under Chief Gurajena and most of the land for this chieftainship was taken by the then white farmers nicknamed Chimunyanja and Kurutu.
