= Raffingora =

Coordinates: 17°02′S 30°26′E

Raffingora is a small town in the province of Mashonaland West, Zimbabwe. It is located about 45 km (28 mi) north-east of Chinhoyi.

It falls in the Zvimba North Political District. The current member of parliament (2013–2018) is Marian Chombo who is also a cabinet minister.
