= Binga village =

Binga
- Town
- Location within Zimbabwe
- Coordinates: 17°37′27″S 27°20′28″E
- Country: Zimbabwe
- Province: Matabeleland North
- District: Binga District

Population (2012 Census)
  - Total: 5,283
- Time zone: UTC+1 (CET)
  - Summer (DST): UTC+1 (CEST)
- Climate: BSh

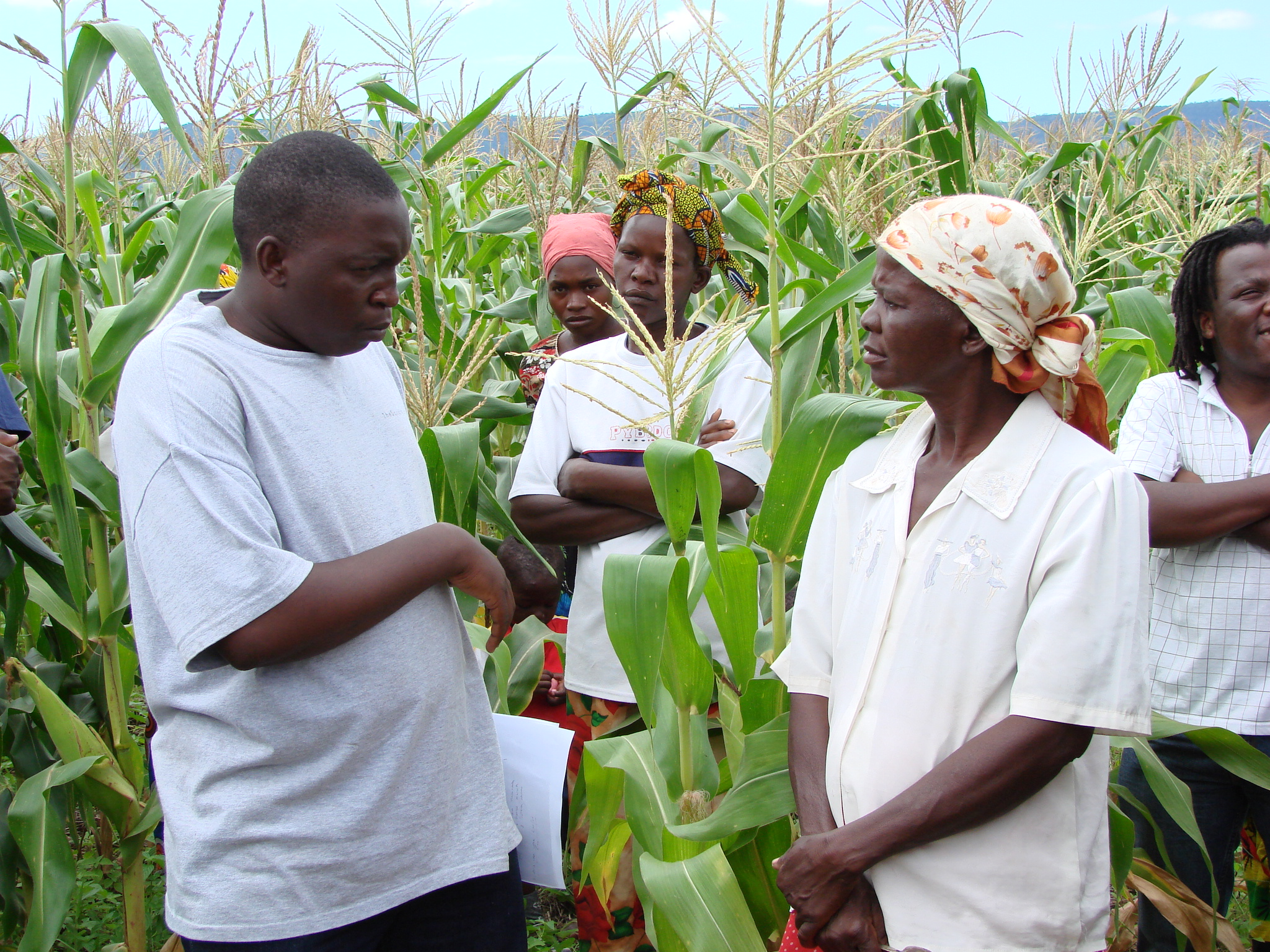
Farming in Binga is just like any other place in Zimbabwe serve for the reduced yields caused by droughts in the region which mostly entirely falls under Zimbabwe's natural farming region 5

Binga is one of the administrative districts in Matabeleland North, located in northwestern Zimbabwe, bordering Zambia along the Zambezi River. Politically, the area has two constituencies, Binga North with 15 wards and Binga South with 10 wards. These form the district's two seats in the lower house. Despite being endowed with vast natural resources the district is among the poorest in Zimbabwe. Binga was built to rehouse the BaTonga people whose homelands were flooded when Lake Kariba was created between 1955-1959. People were forcibly moved from their traditional land in the valley along the Zambezi Valley by the Federal Government of the Central African Federation to pave way for the construction of the Kariba dam and the relocation which was without compensation, is criticized for tearing apart a community that had together for a long time into two distinct nations of Southern and Northern Rhodesia. Binga has 17 traditional chieftainships. It is home to chiefly to the BaTonga people and ChiTonga, one of the 16 official languages in Zimbabwe is predominant in the area. There is a part of the Victoria Falls tourism Economic Zone. The district has some eye catching natural sceneries including the only natural beach popularly known as the Sand Beach, Chibwatata Hot Spring, wildlife, crocodile farms. Binga has one major service Centre informally known as Binga Centre and officially as Kaani Town after it was accorded town status. The BaTonga are better known by their rich unique culture particularly the Budima or Ngoma Buntibe and war dance..

Tourist attractions include the general Zambezi River viewing, Zimbabwe's only sand beach, hot springs, fishing, crocodile farms, game reserves, Chijalile Pass, swamps in the Simatelele Ward area, several stunning gorges, and natural rock outcrops among others. Roads are poor, farmland is limited but vegetation is still in its best condition. There are coal, gas and oil deposits along the Muchesu Area hills.

There is also commercial carpenter, bream, tilapia and tiger fish production in the village. Villagers do domestic fishing at family and individual levels. Resort areas in the district surrounding the village also offer exclusive accommodation and wedding venues.
