= Golden Valley High School =

Golden Valley High School may refer to the following schools in the United States:

- Golden Valley High School (Bakersfield, California)
- Golden Valley High School (Merced, California)
- Golden Valley High School (Santa Clarita, California)
