= Melfort, Zimbabwe =

Coordinates: 18°00′S 31°19′E

Melfort, Zimbabwe is a village in Mashonaland East province in Zimbabwe.
