= Golden Valley, Zimbabwe =

Coordinates: 18°13′S 29°48′E

Golden Valley in Mashonaland West Province

Golden Valley is a village in the Mashonaland West province in Zimbabwe. Golden Valley is located approximately 18 kilometers from the city of Kadoma. The area is owned by the John Mack Company, headquartered in Harare, and is mainly used as a gold mining site. It is recognized as one of the largest gold producers in Mashonaland West Province. Historically, it has produced 2,500 ounces of gold at the average grade of 9 g/t.

In November 2023, Toronto Stock Exchange-listed company Pambili Natural Resources Corporation entered into an agreement for shared purchase to acquire the Golden Valley project as a producing gold mine.

Golden Valley hosts a typical orogenic-style gold deposit situated within the Bulawayo Greenstone Belt. Its geological characteristics are similar to those of other major mines in the region, including the Happy Valley Mine and How Mine, which is operated by Metallon Corporation. On the 25th of November 2024, a discovery was made of a high-grade vein located in Golden Valley's Shaft 14. Laboratory tests returned exceptional grades including 192.5 g/t, 75 g/t, and 63 g/t.
