= Eastnor (Zimbabwe) =

- village
- Eastnor in Zimbabwe
- Coordinates: 19°29′17″S 28°33′49″E
- Country: Zimbabwe
- Province: Midlands
- District: Bubi District
- Elevation: 1,156 m (3,793 ft)

Eastnor is a village in Bubi District, Matabeleland North, Zimbabwe and is located about 125 km northeast of Bulawayo in a commercial farming and gold mining area. It lies next to the Umguemembe (Gwenembe River), and is within the Bubi Mining District. The mining EPOs/leases were owned by Duration Gold (Durbin Mine) in the south, BilboesGold (Bilboes Mine) in the north and Metallon Group (Motapa Mine) in the center. Motapa Mine is immediately adjacent to the village, to the northeast. Bilboes Mine and Motapa Mine were sold to Caledonia Mining Corporation in 2022.
