= Kanyemba =

Village in Zimbabwe

Coordinates: 15°37′37″S 30°25′08″E

Kanyemba is a village in the province of Mashonaland Central, Zimbabwe. It is located on the south bank of the Zambezi river at the extreme northernmost point of Zimbabwe at the meeting point of the Zimbabwean, Mozambican and Zambian borders. The village serves the Dande communal land.

Kanyemba is named after Josè Rosariò De Andrade, a successful prazo holder who was known as Kanyemba ("the ferocious"). Kanyemba, like other przo holders, began assembling a private army of Chikunda soldiers in the 1870s and settled in the region of Bawa, two hundred kilometers west of Tete, from which he either traded with or raided the surrounding countryside. In the 1880s, this warlord was said to have 10000 chikunda at arms. Andrade died in the late nineteenth century and his descendants have retained the village's chieftainship to the present time.

Kanyemba is widely used as a surname in the Mashonaland province. In 2018, the government of Zimbabwe set up a 200 hectare irrigation scheme for the local communities including Chansola village. The major tribes found in Kanyemba are the Chikunda and Doma people.

Kanyemba is the rural home of prominent Zimbabwean personalities such as Zimbabwe Broadcasting Corporation National FM radio producer / presenters Kanyemba "KB" Bonzo and Phillip "Bla Phidza" Makazhu as well as news presenter Sabastian Kanhema and former Commissioner of the Zimbabwe Republic Police Emmanuel S. Ruzario.
