= Gutu District =

Coordinates: 19°39′S 31°10′E

Gutu
- District
- Chemukutu
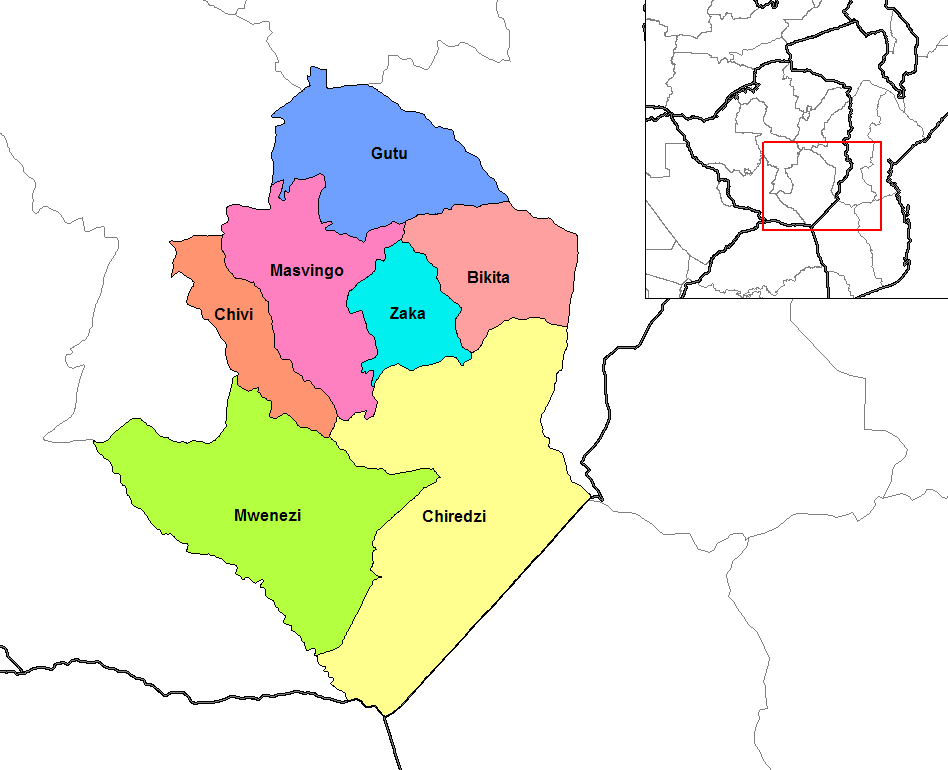
- Districts of Masvingo Province

- Masvingo constituency seats for the 2008, showing the division of Gutu (District)
- Country: Zimbabwe
- Province: Masvingo
- District: Gutu
- Established: late 19th century

Area
  - Total: 7,054 km^{2} (2,724 sq mi)

Population (2022 Census)
  - Total: 208,149
  - Density: 29.51/km^{2} (76.43/sq mi)
- Time zone: UTC+2 (CAT)

Gutu is the third largest district in Masvingo Province, southern Zimbabwe, after Chiredzi and Mwenezi. It is the northernmost district in the province. The name "Gutu" is historically reported to have emerged from "Chinomukutu wemiseve" – meaning, "the one with a load of arrows". This is according to oral historical folklore of the "Gumbo" clan who are said to have taken over the area from the "Shiri" clan through killing them by poisoning the fruit trees in the "Gona" area. Mupandawana is the largest district service centre. It was designated as a "growth point" during the early years of independent Zimbabwe together with such places as Gokwe in the Midlands Province and Juru in Mashonaland East province. Mpandawana gained town status in April 2014.

It was home to the late Oliver Munyaradzi, Simon Muzenda, former vice president of Zimbabwe as well as Vitalis Zvinavashe, a Commander of the Zimbabwe Defence Forces and politician. Dr Costa Maonei, former District Medical Officer, comes from the southern tip of the District. The late Air Vice Marshal Josiah Tungamirai was also a native of Gutu. Nelson Chamisa, a politician and former president of the Citizens Coalition for Change also comes from Gutu. Gutu Mission Hospital found in the district, is one of a number of centers for HIV/AIDS treatment in the province. The population is mostly the Karanga, a Shona sub-tribe. It is one of a few districts in the province where the standard of living is above average. Gutu Rural District council is in charge of the day-to-day running of the district.

== Geography ==
Climatically, the area falls under Natural Region III. Natural Regions (NRs) in Zimbabwe's context are areas delineated on the basis of soil type, rainfall and other climatic factors. It is one of a few districts in the country that suffers from over-population. Its population density of 22.08 per square kilometer is among the highest in the country. Gutu district center had a population of 10-12000 in 1989. Like other districts in the country, medical facilities in the district suffer from shortage of manpower.

Mpandawana Growth Point, a business center in Zimbabwe, is found in the district.

== Government and politics ==
=== General elections 2008 ===
The district was divided into four parts by the electoral commission for the general elections of 2008. Candidates from both the MDC and ZANU-PF and independents will compete for the four constituency seats available and winner will go one to represent the district in Zimbabwe's new House of Assembly.

Matuke Lovemore (Zanu-PF), and Chirume Oliver (MDC Tsvangirai) will contest the Gutu central seat while in Gutu east, Chikwama Bertha (Zanu-PF), Revai Tichaona (Independent), Makamure Ramson (MDC Tsvangirai) will fight it out. In Gutu north, the candidates are Maramwidze Edmore (MDC Tsvangirai), and the late Provincial hero Frank Machinya (Zanu-PF) while Mandevu Tarirai (Zanu-PF), and Maguma Stanley (MDC Tsvangirai) are vying for the Gutu west seat.

The results came as follows: of the five seats, four seats were won by MDC Tsvangirai, and one went to Zanu PF.

== Notable residents ==
- Paul Tangi Mhova Mkondo, nationalist, part of the first group of Gonakudzingwa restriction camp political prisoners, insurance executive, indigenous businessman, commercial farmer, philanthropist.
- Simon Muzenda, nationalist, former Zimbabwean deputy prime minister and vice-president
- Divine Ndhlukula, businesswoman, farmer

== Villages ==
Shenjere Village is an inhabited place located in Gutu District. There is a lower school, "Shenjere Primary School" for 1st to 7th graders in this village.
