= Headlands, Zimbabwe =

Village in Manicaland, Zimbabwe

Coordinates: 18°17′S 32°03′E

Headlands is a township in the province of Manicaland, Zimbabwe, on the main Harare-Mutare road about 136 km (85 mi) from Harare. A trading post and tobacco farming area, it was established in 1891 by white settlers. Originally named Laurencedale after the settlers' leader, Laurence van der Byl, the township's name was changed to Headlands in 1897. By 1898 the railway arrived. Copper was discovered about 34 km (21 mi) away in 1908. Inyati Mine (gold and copper) is in the district Headlands.

Headlands is part of the Makoni District, which is divided into the following areas: Mufusire, Eaglesnest, Chendambuya, Chinyudze, Mupururu, Maparura, Mayo, Chikore, Tanda, Baddeley, Chinhenga, Tsikada, Nyawaro, Nheta, Mazai, Dewerwi, Olivia and Nyahowe.

The ethnic group in Headlands is called Maungwe.
