= List of wards of Zimbabwe =

The Districts of Zimbabwe are divided into 1,970 municipal wards as of 2023. The wards based on the 2008 delimitation are found at List of wards of Zimbabwe (2008). This list follows the 2023 Delimitation Report finalized in February 2023. Wards are stated by constituency, under each province. Detailed descriptions of the ward and constituency boundaries were set out in Annexure B, Chapter 1 of the report.

== Bulawayo Metropolitan Province ==
Bulawayo Metropolitan Province has twelve constituencies and twenty-nine wards.

1. Bulawayo Central - wards 1 (Central Business District, et al.), 4 (Buena Vista, Kabanga, Ilanda, et al.)
2. Bulawayo North - wards 2, 3
3. Bulawayo South - wards 5, 7
4. Cowdray Park - wards 6, 15, 28 - (all part of Cowdray Park)
5. Emakhandeni - Luveve - wards 11 (Emakhandeni, New Lobengula, et al.), 16 (New Luveve, Gwabalanda, et al.)
6. Entumbane-Njube - wards 10, 12
7. Lobengula-Magwegwe - wards 14 (part of Cowdray Park), 18 (Pelandaba West, et al.)
8. Mpopoma-Mzilikazi - wards 8 (Mzilikazi, Nguboyenja, et al.), 9 (Mabuthweni, Mpopoma)
9. Nketa - wards 24, 25, 26
10. Nkulumane- wards 22, 23
11. Pelandaba-Tshabalala - wards 13, 20, 21
12. Pumula - wards 17 (Pumula North, et al.), 19 (Old Pumula, part of Pumula East), 27 (Pumula South)

== Harare Metropolitan Province ==
Harare Metropolitan Province has thirty constituencies and seventy-seven wards. There are three local authorities in Harare Metropolitan Province, wards are numbered separately for each of them.

1. Budiriro North - wards 34, 43 of Harare Municipality
2. Budiriro South - wards 29, 33 of Harare Municipality
3. Chitungwiza North - wards 8, 19, 22, 23, 25 of Chitungwiza Municipality
4. Chitungwiza South - wards 9, 16, 17, 18, 24 of Chitungwiza Municipality
5. Churu - wards 1, 6 of Harare Municipality
6. Dzivarasekwa - wards 40, 39 of Harare Municipality
7. Epworth North - wards 1, 6, 7 of Epworth Local Board
8. Epworth South - wards 2, 4, 5 of Epworth Local Board
9. Glenorah - wards 27, 28 of Harare Municipality
10. Glenview North - wards 26, 30 of Harare Municipality
11. Glenview South - wards 31, 32 of Harare Municipality
12. Harare Central - wards 5, 14 of Harare Municipality
13. Harare East - wards 9, 18 of Harare Municipality
14. Harare South - wards 12, 35 of Harare Municipality
15. Harare West - wards 16, 41 of Harare Municipality
16. Hatcliffe - wards 19, 42 of Harare Municipality
17. Hatfield - wards 22, 23 of Harare Municipality
18. Highfield - wards 24, 25 of Harare Municipality
19. Hunyani - wards 3 of Epworth Local Board and 8 of Harare Municipality
20. Kuwadzana East- wards 37, 45 of Harare Municipality
21. Kuwadzana West - wards 38, 44 of Harare Municipality
22. Mabvuku Tafara - wards 20, 21 of Harare Municipality
23. Mbare - wards 3, 4 of Harare Municipality
24. Mount Pleasant - wards 7, 17 of Harare Municipality
25. Southerton - wards 11, 13 of Harare Municipality
26. St Marys - wards 1, 3, 4, 5, 7 of Chitungwiza Municipality
27. Sunningdale - wards 2, 10 of Harare Municipality
28. Warren Park - wards 15, 36 of Harare Municipality
29. Zengeza East - wards 13, 14, 15, 20, 21 of Chitungwiza Municipality
30. Zengeza West - wards 2, 6, 10, 11, 12 of Chitungwiza Municipality

== Manicaland Province ==
Manicaland Province has twenty-six constituencies and 260 wards. There are ten local authorities in Manicaland Province, wards are numbered separately for each of them.

1. Buhera Central - wards 2, 19, 20, 21, 22, 23, 24, 32 of Buhera RDC
2. Buhera North - wards 7, 8, 9, 10, 11, 12, 13, 14, 31 of Buhera RDC
3. Buhera South - wards 17, 25, 26, 27, 28, 29, 30, 33 of Buhera RDC
4. Buhera West - wards 1, 3, 4, 5, 6, 15, 16, 18 of Buhera RDC
5. Chikanga - wards 1, 6, 16, 14, 19 of Mutare Municipality
6. Chimanimani East - wards 1, 6, 10, 11, 12, 13, 14, 15, 16, 21, 22, 23 of Chimanimani RDC
7. Chimanimani West - wards 2, 3, 4, 5, 7, 8, 9, 17, 18, 19, 20 of Chimanimani RDC, and 22, 26 of Mutare RDC
8. Chipinge Central - wards 1, 2, 3, 4, 5, 6, 7, 8 of Chipinge Town Council and 2, 6, 7, 8, 9 of Chipinge RDC
9. Chipinge East - wards 10, 12, 13, 14, 15, 17, 18, 19 of Chipinge RDC
10. Chipinge South - wards 11, 22, 24, 26, 27, 28, 29, 30 of Chipinge RDC
11. Dangamvura - wards 7, 8, 9, 13, 15, 18 of Mutare Municipality
12. Headlands - wards 6, 7, 8, 11, 32, 34, 37, 38 of Makoni RDC
13. Makoni Central - wards 1, 2, 3, 4, 5, 6, 7, 8, 9, 10 of Rusape Town Council and 19, 20, 21 of Makoni RDC
14. Makoni North - wards 1, 2, 3, 4, 5, 9, 10, 35, 36 of Makoni RDC
15. Makoni South - wards 17, 18, 22, 23, 27, 28, 29, 30, 31, 33 Makoni RDC and 2, 8 of Mutare RDC
16. Makoni West - wards 12, 13, 14, 15, 16, 24, 25, 26, 39 of Makoni RDC
17. Mutare Central - wards 2, 3, 4, 5, 10, 17 of Mutare Municipality
18. Mutare North - wards 1, 3, 4, 5, 9, 10, 11, 12, 31, 34 of Mutare RDC
19. Mutare South - wards 6, 7, 13, 14, 15, 20, 21, 32, 33, 35, 36 of Mutare RDC
20. Mutare West - wards 16, 17, 18, 19, 23, 24, 25, 27, 28, 29, 30 of Mutare RDC
21. Mutasa Central - wards 10, 11, 12, 13, 14, 15, 16, 17, 19, 20, 24, 29 of Mutasa RDC
22. Mutasa North - wards 1, 2, 3, 4, 5, 6, 7, 8, 9, 28, 30, 31 of Mutasa RDC
23. Mutasa South - wards 18, 21, 22, 23, 25, 26, 27 of Mutasa RDC and 11, 12 of Mutare Municipality
24. Mutema-Musikavanhu (Chipinge West) - wards 1, 3, 4, 5, 16, 20, 21, 23, 25 of Chipinge RDC
25. Nyanga North - wards 1, 2, 3, 4, 5, 6, 7, 8, 9, 10, 11, 12, 13, 14, 27 of Nyanga RDC
26. Nyanga South - wards 15, 16, 17, 18, 19, 20, 21, 22, 23, 24, 25, 26, 28, 29, 30, 31 of Nyanga RDC

== Mashonaland Central Province ==
Mashonaland Central Province has eighteen constituencies and 238 wards. There are ten local authorities in Mashonaland Central Province, wards are numbered separately for each of them.

== Mashonaland East Province ==
Mashonaland East Province has twenty-three constituencies and 229 wards. There are eleven local authorities in Mashonaland East Province, wards are numbered separately for each of them.

== Mashonaland West Province ==
Mashonaland West Province has twenty-two constituencies and 234 wards. There are fourteen local authorities in Mashonaland West Province, wards are numbered separately for each of them.

== Masvingo Province ==
Masvingo Province has twenty-six constituencies and 242 wards. There are nine local authorities in Masvingo Province, wards are numbered separately for each of them.

== Matabeleland North Province ==
Matabeleland North Province has thirteen constituencies and 197 wards. There are ten local authorities in Matabeleland North Province, wards are numbered separately for each of them.

== Matabeleland South Province ==
Matabeleland South Province has twelve constituencies and 168 wards. There are ten local authorities in Matabeleland South Province, wards are numbered separately for each of them.

== Midlands Province ==
Midlands Province has twenty-eight constituencies and 296 wards. There are fourteen local authorities in Midlands Province, wards are numbered separately for each of them.
