= Bikita District =

Bikita
- District
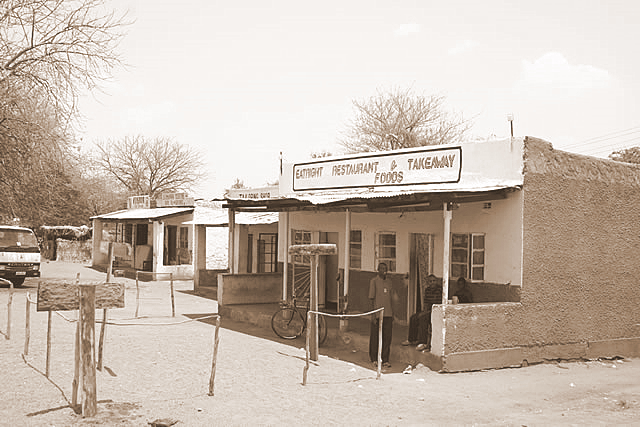
- Typical Scene at business centres across the district.
- Nickname: Bikita kuMakomo
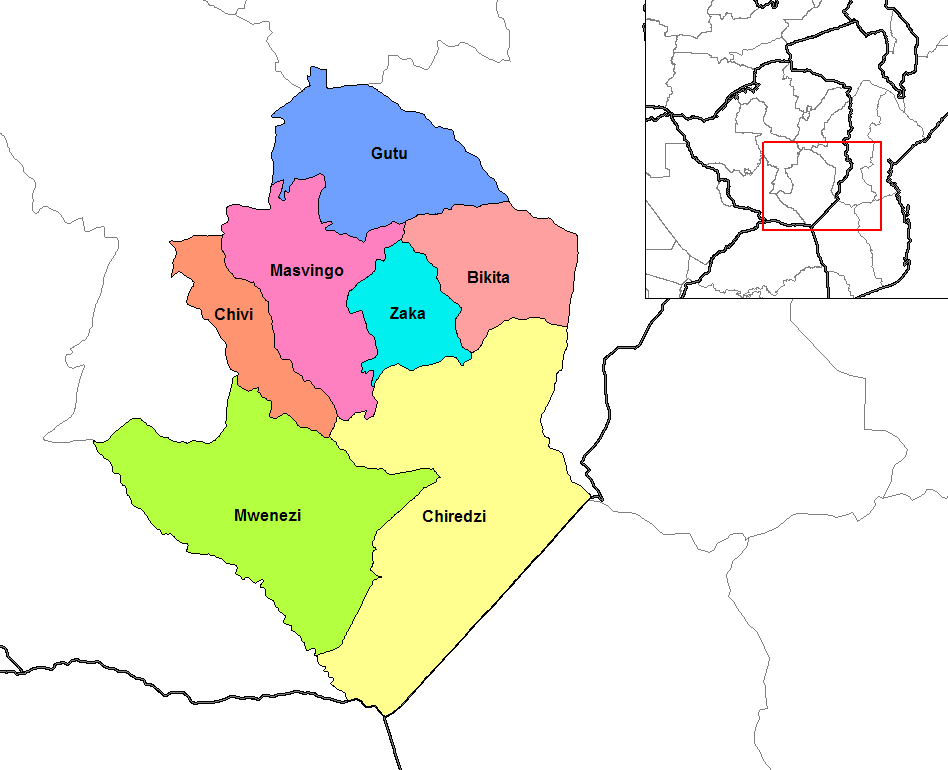
- Districts of Masvingo province

- Masvingo constituency seats for the 2008, showing the division of Bikita (District)
- Coordinates: 20°05′S 31°37′E
- Country: Zimbabwe
- Province: Masvingo

Government
  - Type: Rural Council
  - Council Chairman: Councillor Mataga
  - Chief Executive Officer: Vacancy (Eng Arnold Mutuke Acting)

Population (2022 Census)
  - Total: 176,835
- Time zone: UTC+2 (CAT)

Bikita is a district in Masvingo Province in Zimbabwe. It borders with Gutu District, Zaka District, Chipinge District, Chiredzi District, and Buhera District . It is located about 80 kilometres (50 mi) east of Masvingo town. Its administration is at Nyika Growth Point but initially it was at Bikita Office, 10 km south of Nyika Growth Point towards Jerera Growth Point in Zaka District.Bikita District in Zimbabwe is divided into several chiefdoms, including Chief Budzi, Chief Mukanganwi, Chief Mazungunye, Chief Mabika, Chief Marozva, and Chief Ziki. Additionally, the district has 17 headmen and 1,101 village heads.

Bikita District is named after a sacred mountain with similar name but with the "B" pronounced as a soft "B". It is reported that the original colonial administrative offices were located in the foothills of Bikita Mountain before being moved to Bikita Office located 10 km south of Nyika Growth Point. Bikita mountain is located in the Chikuku area of Bikita East approximately 53 km away from Birchenough Bridge. Folklore states that whenever the ancestors are angry, lions can be located in Bikita Mountain whose top is often shrouded in mist.

The district is under the administration of the Bikita Rural District Council with Chairman of the council as the Mayoral Figure (Councillor Matanga) and a CEO as the Executive figure of the Council/District(contested).

There is a Lithium mine in Bikita District along the Mutare-Masvingo highway at about 23 km from Nyika Growth Point towards Masvingo town. Bikita District is believed to be one of the richest Rural municipalities with diamond belt stretching from Chiadzwa, via Devure down south. The municipality also owns Mkonto Mine, with a rich belt of gold located in Save Conservatives. Save Conservatives is also owned by Bikita District Council with all big five Animals. The district is further blessed with natural guava trees, providing free guava to the natives

== Government and politics ==
The district sends three members to Zimbabwe's House of Assembly. Each of the wards in the district has an elected official who works at the rural district council.

The district was divided into three sections for the 2008 elections, namely east, west and south. The district was a stronghold of ZANU-PF from 1980 until the time of the 2008 parliamentary election, when the opposition Movement for Democratic Change (MDC) won all three seats, one with a razor thin margin.

=== Bikita South ===
Bikita South, Zaka east and central, is made of wards 1, 2, 3, 4, 6, 7, 8, 26, 28, and 29. During the 2008 House of Assembly elections, Luka Gumbare (ZANU-PF), Wilson Makonya (MDC (mut)) and Jani Varandeni (MDC (tsv)) ran for the seat. The Zimbabwe Electoral Commission (ZEC) announced Jani Marandeni as the winner with a total of 6,916 votes to 5,284 of Luka Gumbare. Matsai community is one of the most impoverished in Bikita but it has its shining beacon Mashoko mission with a renowned hospital and state-of-the-art high school. Ward 28 and 29 is made up of small scale commercial farms. These farms were mostly purchased in the early 1950s. During the 2018 House of Assembly elections JOSIAH SITHOLE [JK] (ZANU PF) was announced the winner by ZEC with a total of 10300 votes followed by Jeppy Jaboon (MDC Alliance) with 3000 votes.

=== Bikita East ===
Bikita East comprises wards 14, 15, 16, 17, 18, 20, 21, 24, 25, and 27. Matthew Makaza (ZANU-PF), Walter Mutsauri (independent) and Edmore Marima (MDC (Tsva)) ran for the seat for the House of Assembly. According to the ZEC, Edmore Marima won the seat with 7,784 votes to 5,373 polled by Walter Mutsauri.

=== Bikita West ===
The constituency seat is made up of eleven wards, namely 5, 9, 10, 11, 12, 13, 16, 22, 23, and 32. Ellias Musakwa (ZANU-PF) and Heya Shoko (MDC (tsv)) ran for the seat. Shoko narrowly won the seat with 7,048 votes to Musakwa's 7,029.
