= Masvingo Province =

Coordinates: 21°00′S 31°00′E

Masvingo Province: Dunhu reMasvingo (Shona); Isabelo seMasvingo (Northern Ndebele); Victoria Province
- Province
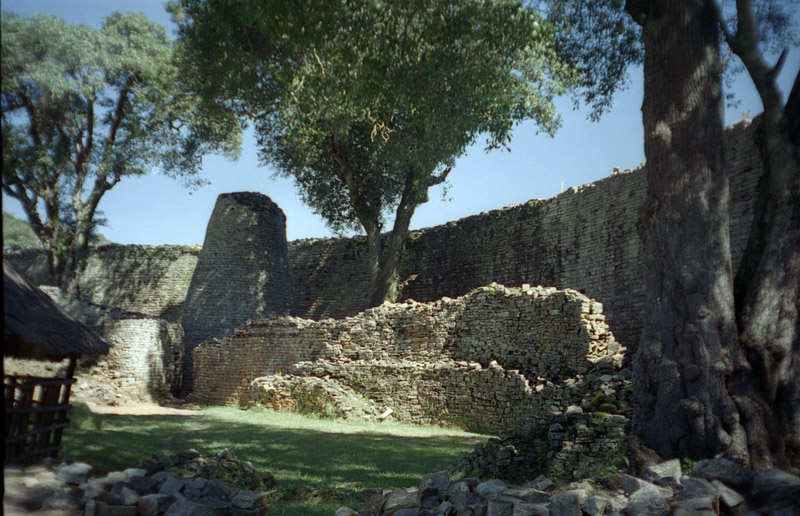
- Great Zimbabwe ruins, found in the province.

- Masvingo, Province of Zimbabwe

- Masvingo constituency seats for the 2008 elections
- Country: Zimbabwe
- Capital: Masvingo
- Established: late 19th century

Government
  - Type: Provincial Government
  - Minister of State for Provincial Affairs: Ezra Chadzamira (ZANU-PF)

Area
  - Total: 56,566 km^{2} (21,840 sq mi)

Population (2022 census)
  - Total: 1,638,528
  - Density: 28.967/km^{2} (75.023/sq mi)
- Time zone: UTC+2 (CET)
  - Summer (DST): UTC+2 (CEST)
- HDI (2021): 0.588 medium · 4th of 10

Masvingo, previously named Victoria, is a province in southeastern Zimbabwe. It has a population of 1.638 million as of the 2022 census, ranking fifth out of Zimbabwe's ten provinces. Established by the British South Africa Company, it was one of the five original provinces of Southern Rhodesia. In 1982, two years after Zimbabwean independence, it was renamed Masvingo Province. The province is divided into seven districts, including Masvingo District, which contains the provincial capital Masvingo City.

Masvingo Province is bordered by Matabeleland South Province to the southwest, Midlands Province to the northwest, Manicaland Province to the northeast, and Mozambique to the southeast. It has an area of 56,566 square kilometres (21,840 mi^{2}), equal to 14.48% of the total area of Zimbabwe. It is the third-largest in area of Zimbabwe's provinces, after Matabeleland North and Mashonaland West. A diverse province, the Karanga, a Shona subgroup, form the majority, with communities of Tsonga people in the southeast and Ndebele people in the west. Its economy is largely centred around agriculture and tourism. Masvingo Province is home to the Great Zimbabwe ruins, a World Heritage Site and major tourist attraction.

== History ==
The town of Fort Victoria was founded in 1890 and was the first large settlement to be established by the Pioneer Column of the British South Africa Company which makes it the oldest town in Zimbabwe. It was named in honour of Queen Victoria.

The province is largely populated by members of the Karanga tribe, who are a sub-group of the Shona speaking tribes that also include the Zezuru, Manyika, and Ndau. The province is in the drier lowveldt area in the south of Zimbabwe but however, the boundaries have undergone some changes in the 1980s. From white settlement until 2000 most of the area was devoted to cattle ranching, with mining and sugar cane growing (irrigated from Lake Mutirikwi), and communal areas where subsistence farming is carried out. With the land reforms of the early 21st century large scale cattle and mixed farms are being redistributed to small farmers.

== Geography ==
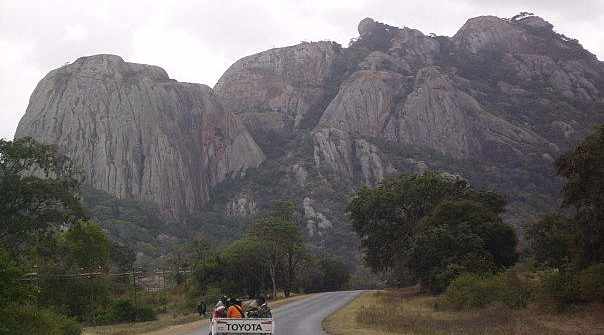
Scenery along the A1 highway between Beitbridge & Masvingo, 2006

Masvingo (formerly Fort Victoria) is the capital of the province. Chiredzi and Triangle are other major towns in the province. Other towns include Mashava and the newly upgraded Mpandawana which used to be a growth point. The province is dominated by the Save, Runde, Mwenezi and Limpopo river systems which all either join or drain directly into the Indian Ocean. Kopjes, grey and bald in the hot sun, dot the countryside with mopane trees, which are drought tolerant and sturdy, found throughout the province.

=== Climate ===
Masvingo province has a tropical savannah climate and is located in the low veld of the country where rainfall is minimal and uncertain. A large part of the southern area of the province is drought prone, set as region 5 in the country's climatic regions. Most parts of the province, therefore, are generally unfit for agriculture, apart from cattle ranching Hippo Valley estates in Chiredzi and Triangle use the water from Lake Kyle for irrigation.

== Demographics ==
Besides the aridness, the residents of the province are tillers of the earth and like most Bantu tribes in Southern Africa they practise animal husbandry to supplement their diets.

Masvingo has an area of 56,566 km^{2} and a population of approximately 1.3 million (2002). The Karanga form a majority of the province's population and Shona is the primary language. In Chiredzi District, there are communities of Tsonga people while those of the Ndebele are found on the western edge of the province. To the north-east, are found the Ndau. The white population has declined since independence, especially during the invasions of commercial farms in 2000. In fact, the first farm invasion occurred in Masvingo Province and the rest of the country followed suit.

Census	Population
2002	1,320,438
2012	1,485,090
2022	1,638,528

== Government ==
The province's leader is a Minister for Provincial Affairs appointed by the country's president for a five-year term of office. The current Minister is Ezra Chadzamira appointed in 2018. The province also sends six elected members to the Senate plus a number of chiefs. In addition, twenty six members of parliament, selected from the province's seven districts, are sent to the House of Assembly.

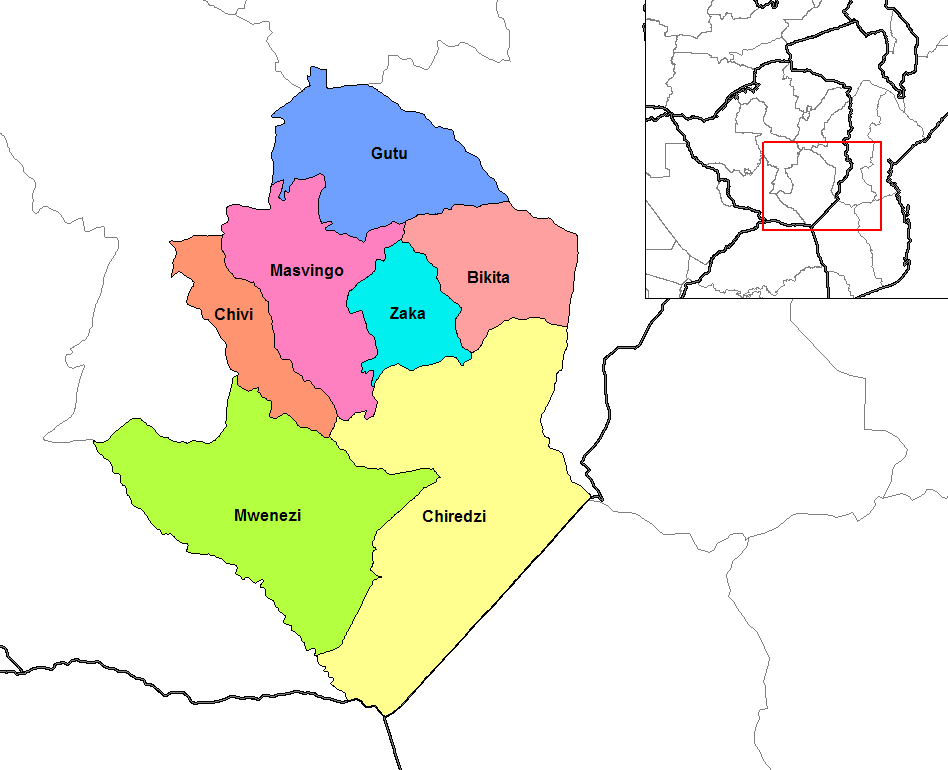
Districts of Masvingo

=== Districts ===
The districts are run by the rural district councils, which are composed of members elected from the wards in the district. Masvingo is divided into seven administrative districts, although these can be further divided by the delimitation committee during elections depending on population figures. The districts are Bikita, Chivi, Zaka and Masvingo in the center of the province, Gutu in the north, and Mwenezi, and Chiredzi in the south and east respectively. All these seven districts have business centres known as growth points except for Mpandawana (recently granted town status), and they are as follows with estimation of distance from Masvingo city centre: Masvingo- Nemanwa (30 km), Bikita- Nyika (82 km), Zaka- Jerera (96 km), Gutu- Mupandawana (94 km).

=== Elections ===
Masvingo was generally regarded as a stronghold of ZANU-PF, the ruling party. In the parliamentary elections of 2005, ZANU-PF won all but one district of the fourteen seats up for grabs. For the election of March, 2008 the seven districts were redistributed into twenty-six constituencies.

== Economy ==
Tourism is a major contributor to the province's GDP, as is agriculture.

=== Mining ===
- Bikita mine

== Transportation ==
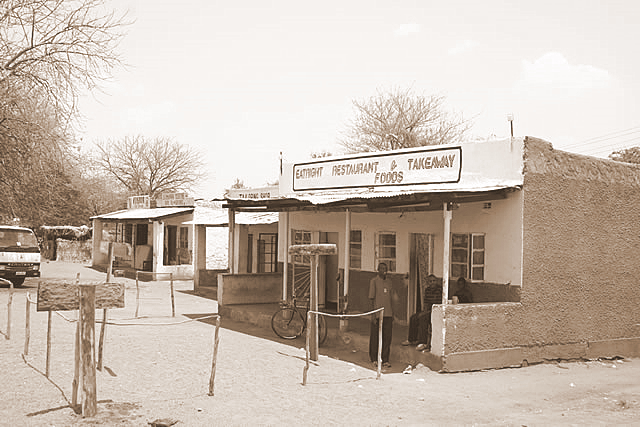
Typical bus station scene in districts scattered across the province. At every bus station along the highway is found a retail shop.

The busy A1 highway connects the major centers of Masvingo and Beitbridge.

== Education ==
Masvingo has two universities, namely Great Zimbabwe University (GZU) and Reformed Church University. The province also has Masvingo Polytechnic.

Masvingo Province also has Margaretha Hugo School for the Blind (Copota), which is the first school for the visually impaired to be established in Zimbabwe.

== Tourism ==
The province has a number of attractions. In the east of the province along the Mozambique border is Gonarezhou National Park, part of the Gaza, Kruger and Gonarezhou Transfrontier National Park concept. Less than an hour away to the east lies the world-famous stone ruins of Great Zimbabwe National Monument, from which Zimbabwe draws its name. A little closer to the stone ruins is Lake Kyle, a huge body of water where people spend time engaged in recreational actives in Mutirikwi Recreational Park. Tourism is a major contributor to the province's GDP, as is agriculture.

== Notable people ==
The province has produced a number of notable figures in the history of Zimbabwe. which include

- Nelson Chamisa, leader of the MDC Alliance party
- Emmerson Mnangagwa, president who was raised in Chivi
- Simon Muzenda
- Edson Zvobgo
- Paul Tangi Mhova Mkondo
- Crispen Mandizvidza
- Stan Mudenge
- Alois Chidoda
- Shuvai Mahova
- Josiah Tungamirai
- Josiah Hungwe.
- Paul Matavire
- Vitalis Zvinavashe, second supreme commander of the Zimbabwe Defence Forces
- Michael Hornby, American politician born in Chiredzi

== Image gallery ==
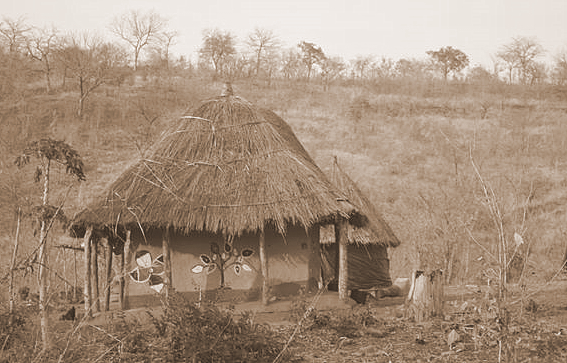

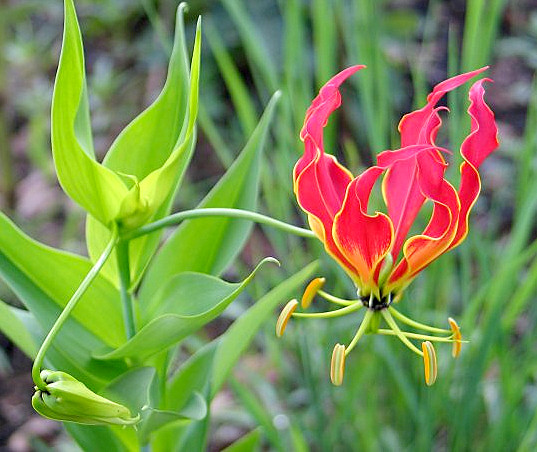

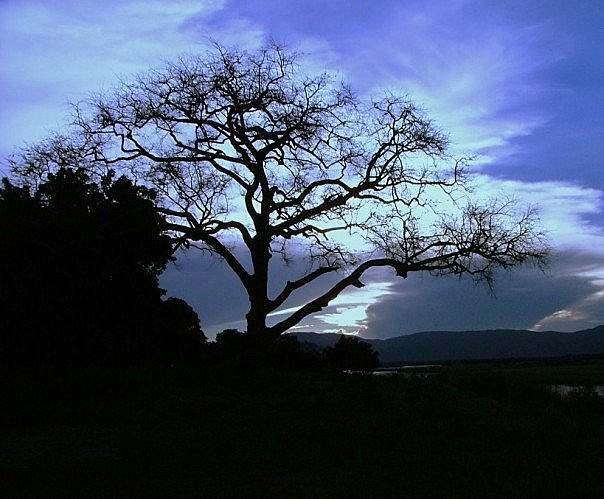

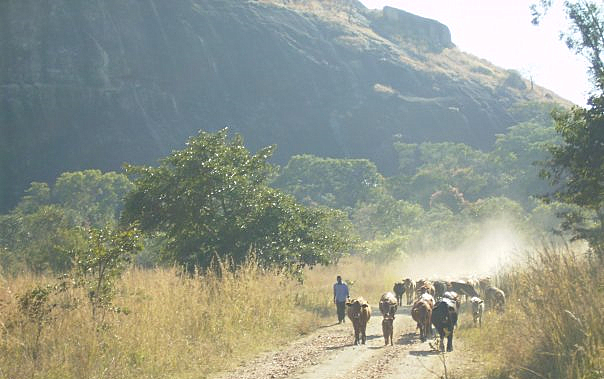

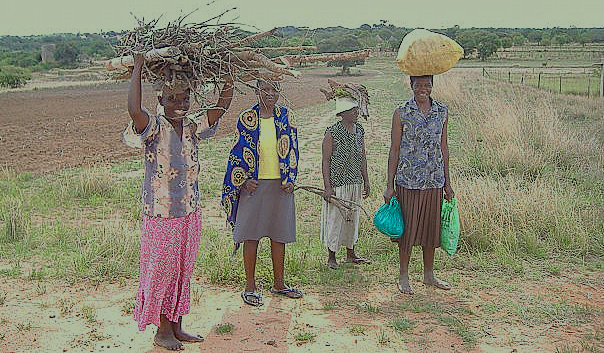

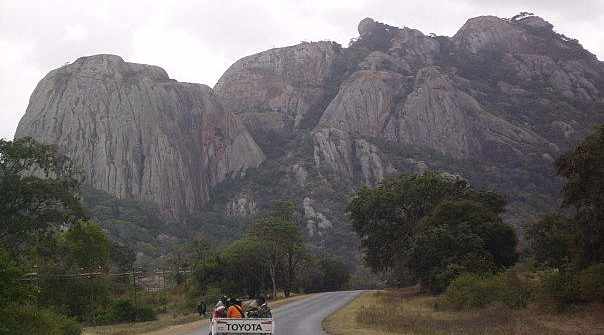

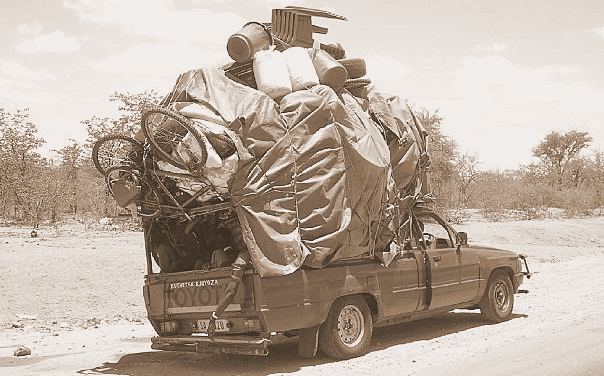

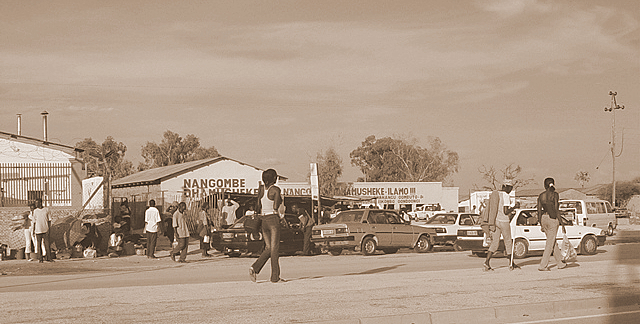

== See also ==
- Provinces of Zimbabwe
- Districts of Zimbabwe
