= List of wards of Zimbabwe (2008) =

In the 2008 delimitation the Districts of Zimbabwe were divided into 1,200 municipal wards. The wards based on the 2008 delimitation are listed below, by district. This delineation was superseded in 2023. For that delimitation see List of wards of Zimbabwe.

== Beitbridge District ==
- Beitbridge
- Chipise
- Dendele
- Dite II
- Machuchuta
- Maramani
- Masera
- Mtetengwe I
- Mtetengwe II
- Mtetengwe III
- Siyoka I
- Siyoka II
- Unincorporated Area

== Bikita District ==
- Baradzanwa
- Bikita
- Boora
- Chigumisirwa
- Chikuku
- Chikukutu
- Chiremwaremwa
- Chirorwe
- Devure
- Devure Ranch
- Gangare
- Magocha
- Marozva (a)
- Marozva (b)
- Mashoko
- Matsvange
- Mazungunye
- Mukore
- Mungezi
- Mupamaonde
- Murwira
- Museti
- Mutikizizi
- Negovano
- Nyahunda
- Nyarushiri
- Unincorporated Area

== Bindura District ==
- Chiveso
- Dindinyongwe
- Gudza
- Guwa
- Mhumhurwi
- Muchapondwa
- Muonwe
- Mupandira
- Mutowa
- Nyava
- Unincorporated Area

== Binga District ==
- Chete National Park
- Chinonge
- Chunga
- Dobola
- Kabuba
- Kariangwe
- Kalungwizi
- Lubimbi
- Lubu
- Lunga
- Manjolo
- Muchesu
- Nabusenga
- National Park
- Nsenga
- Pashu
- Saba-lubanda
- Siachilaba
- Sianzyundu
- Sikalenge
- Simatelele
- Sinamagonde
- Sinampande-Nagangala
- Sinansengwe
- Tinde
- Unincorporated Area

== Bubi District ==
There were twenty-three wards in Bubi District in both the 2012 census, and the 2022 census. These are further divided into 155 villages. See district ward map for Bubi District.

- Ward 3 - includes Mbembeswana
- Ward 4 - includes Katolonyeni
- Ward 8 - includes the villages of Eastnor, Dabula, Dabengwa, Ngiki, Rhino Village and Swati Village 2
- Nkosikazi East
- Nkosikazi North
- Nkosikazi South
- Ward 11 - Inyathi
- Ward 12 - Dromoland includes Shimmers Plots
- Ward 13 consists of Battlefield, Clonmore, Wessels, Blocksome and Allendale
- Ward 15 - East Inyathi, includes Copa Village, Inyati Mission
- Ward 19 - includes Kenelworth
- Ward 21 - includes Bona and the village of Lonely Mine
- Unincorporated

== Buhera District ==
- Betera
- Chapwanya
- Chikuwa
- Chimombe 'b (Chimombe-chiweshe)
- Chimombe A
- Chimombe B
- Chimombe East
- Chimombe West
- Chimombe West (Chimutsa W)
- Chimutsa East
- Chirozva A
- Chirozva B
- Chitsunge
- Chiweshe
- Garamwera
- Mabvuregudo
- Makumbe
- Makuvise
- Marume
- Mawire
- Mombeyarara A
- Mombeyarara B
- Mudinzwa A
- Mudinzwa B
- Mudzamiri
- Munyira
- Murambinda
- Murwira
- Mushumba East
- Mushumba West
- Mutiusinazita
- Nechavava
- Nerutanga
- Neshava

== Bulawayo District ==
- Unincorporated

== Bulilimamangwe District ==
- Bambadzi
- Bango
- Dombodema
- Dombolefu
- Empandeni
- Figtree
- Gala
- Gwambe
- Hingwe
- Huwana
- Izimnyama
- Mabhuna
- Madlambuzi
- Magcobafuthi
- Makhulela
- Malanswazi
- Mambale
- Maninji
- Marula
- Masendu
- Matjingwe
- Mphoengs
- Natane
- Ndolwane
- Nyele
- Raditladi
- Sangulube
- Sansukwe
- Somnene
- Tjankwa
- Vulindlela
- Unincorporated Area

== Chegutu District ==
- Chivero C (n)
- Chivero M
- Chivero M (l)
- Chivero O
- Gora
- Mashayamombe (i)
- Mashayamombe K
- Mashayamombe P (j)
- Murombedzi (h)
- Ngezi C
- Ngezi D
- Nherera A
- Nherera B
- Nyamweda (q)
- Nyamweda P
- Rwizi F
- Unincorporated Area
- Ward 22 (Murombedzi H)

== Chikomba District ==
- Unincorporated Area

== Chimanimani District ==
- Biriri
- Bumha (shinja Rs)
- Chabika
- Chakowa
- Changazi
- Chayamiti
- Chikukwa
- Chikwakwa
- Chiramba
- Guune
- Kudzanga
- Manyuseni
- Mhakwe
- Mhandarume
- Ngorima A
- Ngorima B
- Nyahonde (nagodi Rs)
- Nyanyadzi
- Rupise
- Shinja
- Unincorporated Area

== Chipinge District ==
- Ada Chisumbanje
- Ada Middle Sabi
- Bangwe/maunganidze
- Checheche
- Chibunji
- Chibuwe
- Chikore
- Chinyaduma
- Chipinge Urban
- Chisumbanje
- Chisungo
- Chitenderano
- Chitepo
- Doroi
- Dumisani
- Gumira
- Hondoyapera
- Jersey
- Machona
- Madhuku
- Mahenye
- Manzvire
- Maongere
- Mapungwana
- Masonga
- Mbuyanehanda
- Musani
- Mushandirapamwe
- Musirizwi A
- Musirizwi B
- Mutandahwe
- Muzite
- Ngaone
- Nyagadza I
- Nyagadza Ii
- Nyamukunga
- Nyaringire
- Rudo
- Small Dell Estate
- Tamandayi
- Tongogara Refugee Camp
- Turaizvombo
- Tuzuka
- Unincorporated Area

== Chiredzi District ==
- Batanai
- Chechingwe
- Chibavahlengwe
- Chibwedziva
- Chikombedzi
- Chitsa
- Chizvirizvi
- Dikitiki
- Dzidzela
- Gonakudzingwa
- Gonarezhou
- Makambe
- Maose
- Mkwasine
- Mukuwini
- Mupinga
- Nyangambe
- Sabi Valley Ica
- Sengwe
- Tshovani
- Twananani
- Unincorporated Area
- Xini

== Chirumhanzu District ==
- Charandura
- Chengwena
- Chinyuni
- Chizhou
- Mapiravana
- Maware
- Mhende
- Musoropamwe
- Takawira
- Takawira Resett
- Tatonga
- Tokwe (tokwe Iv) Rs
- Unincorporated Area

== Chivi District ==
- Bachi
- Badza\tiritose
- Batanai
- Batanai B
- Bhefurai
- Chasiyatende
- Chemuzangari
- Chigwikwi
- Chitenderano
- Kuvhirimara
- Madamombe
- Madzivadondo
- Manyanga
- Marihuru
- Matsveru
- Mazihuru
- Mukamba
- Munaka
- Neruvanga
- Ngundu
- Nhamoyapera
- Nyahombe
- Rusununguko
- Takawira
- Unincorporated Area
- Utsinda
- Zifunzi
- Zvamapere

== Gokwe North District ==
- Chireya I
- Chireya Ii
- Chireya Iii
- Goredema
- Gumunyu I
- Gumunyu Ii
- Madzivazvido
- Makore I
- Makore Ii
- Musadzi Rs
- Nembudziya I
- Nembudziya Ii
- Nembudziya Iii
- Nenyunga
- Nora Rs
- Nyaurungwe Rs
- Simchembo I
- Simchembo Ii
- Tsungai Rs
- Unincorporated Area
- Wadze Rs

== Gokwe South District ==
- Chemagora Lscfa
- Chirima
- Chirisa Park
- Chisina I
- Chisina Ii
- Chisina Iii
- Huchu
- Jahana
- Jiri
- Masuka
- Mukoka Msala
- Muyambi
- Ndhlalambi I
- Ndhlalambi Ii
- Nemangwe I
- Nemangwe Ii
- Nemangwe Iii
- Nemangwe Iv
- Nemangwe V
- Ngomeni
- Njelele I
- Njelele Ii
- Njelele Iii
- Sai Mangidi
- Sai Mangisi
- Sai Sengwa
- Unincorporated Area

== Goromonzi District ==
- Chinyika
- Dzvete
- Gutu
- Mawanga
- Munyawiri
- Murape
- Mwanza
- Pote
- R' Nine – Shangure
- Rusike
- Shumba
- Unincorporated Area

== Guruve District ==
- Bepura I
- Bepura Ii
- Bepura Iii
- Chapoto
- Chipuriro A
- Chipuriro B
- Chipuriro C
- Chiriwo
- Chisunga
- Chitsungo
- Knyurira
- Mamini
- Matsiwo A
- Matsiwo B
- Mukwenya
- Mutota
- Neshangwe
- Nyamhondoro
- Shayavhudzi
- Suoguru
- Unincorporated Area

== Gutu District ==
- Basera
- Chigombe
- Chihambakwe
- Chikwanda\mazare
- Chimedza
- Chinyika
- Chitsa
- Chiwara
- Chuguhune/denhere
- Devure
- Gutu South
- Jinjika
- Kubiku
- Magombedze
- Majada
- Makore
- Makudo
- Makuvaza
- Mataruse
- Matizha
- Mawere\Maungwa
- Mazuru West
- Mukaro
- Munjanganja\Mupata
- Munyaradzi\dzivarimwe
- Munyikwa
- Mupandawana
- Mushayavanhu
- Mutema
- Mutero\nyamande
- Ndahwi
- Nerupiri
- Nyamande
- Nyazvidzi Sscfa
- Serima\mavotsa
- Soti Source
- Unincorporated Area
- Vhunjere
- Zoma
- Zvavahera/dandavare

== Gwanda District ==
- Halisupi
- Buvuma
- Sengezane
- Mtshabezi Mission
- Garanyemba
- Gungwe
- Nhwali
- Kafusi
- Lushongwe
- Manama
- Matshetshe
- Mtshazo
- Mzimuni
- Nkwidze
- Ntalale
- Shake
- Silonga
- Simbumbumbu
- Sizeze
- Unincorporated Area

== Gweru District ==
- Bafana
- Gambiza
- Ilithelezwe
- Madikani
- Masvori Rs
- Mdubiwa
- Mlezu
- Mutengwa
- Nkawana
- Nyabango
- Nyama
- Sikombingo
- Somabhula
- Unincorporated Area

== Harare District ==
- Unincorporated Area

== Hurungwe District ==
- Chemusimbe
- Chiroti/fuleche
- Chundu
- Dandahwa
- Kanyati
- Kapfunde
- Kapiri
- Karereshi
- Karoi
- Karuru
- Kazangarare
- Makuti & Charara
- Masanga
- Matau
- Mudzimu
- Muzilawembe, (Mukakatanwa)
- Nyama
- Nyamhunga
- Piriviri
- Pote I
- Pote II
- Pote III
- Ward 5 (Chisape)
- Ward 6 (Maumbe)
- Ward 7 (Chanetsa)
- Unincorporated Areas: Mana Pools National Park, Chewore Safaria Area, Hurungwe Safari Area, Sapi Safari Area

== Hwange District ==
- Chidobe
- Chikandakubi
- Dete
- Jambezi
- Kachecheti
- Lupote
- Mabale
- Makwandara
- Mbizha
- Nekabandama
- Nekatambe
- Nemananga
- Sidinda
- Silewu
- Simangani
- Change
- Unincorporated Area

== Hwedza District ==
- Unincorporated Area
- Ruzane
- Chigondo
- Zviyambe
- Goneso

== Insiza District ==
- Avoca
- Bekezela
- Gwatemba
- Mahole
- Mashoko
- Masiyephambili
- Mbondweni
- Ntunteni
- Sanele
- Sidzibe
- Silalabuhwa
- Unincorporated Area
- Vokola

== Kadoma District ==
- Chegutu 6 Rs
- Chenjiri S Scale
- Hartley Safari
- Jondale/bumbe
- Jopani Rs
- Manyoni Estate
- Muzvezve I Rs
- Muzvezve Ii Rs
- Ngezi National Parks
- Sachuru Rs
- Unincorporated Area

== Kariba District ==
- Bumi Hills
- Chalala
- Charara Safaris
- Gatshegatshe
- Hurungwe Safaris B
- Kanyati A
- Kanyati B
- Matusadonha Safaris
- Mola A
- Mola B
- Musambakaruma A
- Musambakaruma B
- Negande B
- Negande A
- Unincorporated Area

== Kwekwe District ==
- Batanai
- Chaminuka Ii
- Chitepo
- Empress Mine
- Gwesela West
- Inhlangano
- Kubatana
- Kushinga
- Kwayedza
- Mabura
- Makaba
- Msokeli
- Mtshikitsha
- Nhlanganisa
- Ntabeni North
- Ntabeni South
- Sebenzani
- Sesombi I
- Sesombi I Rs
- Sesombi Ii Rs
- Sesombi Iii
- Sesombi Iii Rs
- Sidakeni
- Silobela
- Tongogara
- Unincorporated Area
- Zhombe Central

== Lupane District ==
- Daluka
- Dandanda
- Dongamuzi
- Gomoza
- Gwamba
- Jibajiba
- Jotsholo
- Lake Alice
- Lupaka
- Lupanda (22)
- Lusulu
- Malunku
- Matshiya
- Matshokotsha
- Menyezwa
- Mzola (4)

Mzola (27)

- Ndimimbili
- Pupu
- Sibombo
- Sobendle
- St Pauls
- Tshongokwe
- Kana

Gwayi Mbembesi Lupanda (28)

- Unincorporated Area

== Makonde District ==
- Chitomborwizi
- Doma
- Magonde
- Matashu
- Unincorporated Area
- Ward 17 (Tategura Rs)
- Ward 3
- Ward 4
- Ward 5

== Makoni District ==
- Batanai
- Bembero
- Chiduku
- Chinyamahumba
- Chitangazuva
- Denzva
- Dowa
- Dumbamwe
- Gweza
- Gwidza
- Mashayamvura
- Matotwe
- Mhezi
- Mutombwa
- Mutungagore
- Nehanda
- Ngowe
- Nyahangare
- Nyahonwe
- Nyamagura
- Nyamatanda
- Nyamidzi
- Pasipanodya
- Rongwe
- Ruombwe
- Sangano
- Tikwiri
- Tsagura
- Unincorporated Area
- Zurura

== Marondera District ==
- Unincorporated Area

== Masvingo District ==
- Charumbira (a)
- Charumbira (b)
- Charumbira (c)
- Chatikobo
- Chikwanda
- Dowa
- Gozho
- Guwa
- Inyoni Rs
- Machitenda
- Mapanzure
- Maregere
- Marirangwe
- Mhara
- Mshagashe East
- Mshagashe West
- Mugabe
- Mukosi Rs
- Munyambe
- Murinye (a)
- Murinye (b)
- Mushandike
- Mushavhi
- Mushawasha East Sscfa
- Mushawasha West Sscfa
- Musingarambwi
- Mutonhodza
- Ngomahuru Sscfa
- Nyajena
- Nyajena
- Nyamande
- Nyikavanhu
- Shumba
- Summerton Rs
- Tokwane\ngundu Rs
- Unincorporated Area
- Zimuto
- Zvinyaningwe East Sscfa
- Zvinyaningwe West Sscfa

== Matobo District ==
- Bambanani
- Beula
- Bidi
- Dema
- Donkwedonkwe
- Dzembe
- Gwezha
- Lingwe
- Madwaleni
- Makhasa
- Malaba
- Manyane
- Marinoha
- Makwe
- Mbembeswana
- Mbuso
- Mkokha
- Nqindi
- Sigangatsha
- Silebuhwa
- Sontala
- St Anna
- Unincorporated Area
- Vulindlela
- Zamanyoni
- Lukadzi

== Mazowe District ==
- Chaminuka
- Chipiri
- Chiwororo
- Endaikwenyu
- Gato
- Makombwe
- Masiyazvengo
- Nehanda
- Nyadzonya
- Nyota
- Sawi
- Tafirenyika
- Takawira
- Unincorporated Area

== Mberengwa District ==
- (New Castle) Rs
- Baradzamwa
- Bhangwe
- Bhinya Road
- Chebvute
- Chegato
- Cheshanga
- Chingechuru
- Chingoma A
- Chingoma B
- Chizungu
- Danga
- Dunda
- Lscfa (mberengwa Ica)
- Magamba
- Mahlebadza
- Makuwerere
- Masvingo
- Mataga
- Mataruse B I
- Mataruse B Ii
- Maziofa
- Mketi
- Muchembere
- Murerezi
- Mushandirapamwe
- Musume
- Ngungumbane
- Nyamondo Ii
- Nyamondo Iii
- Ruremekedzo
- Vukomba
- Zvomukonde

== Mudzi District ==
- Bangauya
- Chikwizo A
- Chikwizo B
- Chimukoko
- Goronga A
- Goronga B
- Makaha A
- Makaha B
- Masarakufa
- Mukota A
- Mukota B
- Mukota C
- Nyakuchena
- Nyamukoho
- Nyatana Game Park
- Shinga (Shanga)
- Suswe

== Mount Darwin District ==
- Bveke
- Chahwanda
- Chesa Danzva
- Chesa Mtondwe
- Chesa North
- Chesa Nyajenje
- Chesa South
- Chiswiti
- Chitse
- Dotito
- Gomo Chigango
- Kaitano
- Kandeya
- Karanda
- Karuyana North
- Karuyana South
- Matope
- Mudzengerere
- Mukumbura
- Nembire
- Nohwedza
- Pachanza
- Sohwe
- Unincorporated Area

== Murehwa District ==
- Chigonda
- Chigwarada
- Chikwira
- Chipiri
- Chitowa North
- Chitowa South
- Chiunze I
- Chiunze Ii
- Domborembudzi
- Karamba
- Mabika
- Manyika
- Maramba
- Marowe
- Masiyandima
- Mawanza Chitsungo
- Muchinjike
- Mukarakate
- Mukuruanopamaenza
- Musami
- Nhakiwa I
- Nhakiwa Ii
- Nyamhara
- Rota
- Rukudzi
- Unincorporated Area
- Zhombwe

== Mutare District ==
- Buwerimwe
- Bvumba L.s.c.f.a
- Chiadzwa
- Chimoio
- Chindunduma
- Chishakwe I
- Chishakwe Ii
- Chitora
- Dora North
- Dora South
- Dzobo
- Gandayi
- Gombakomba
- Kugarisana
- Kushingirira
- Mafararikwa A
- Mafararikwa B
- Mudzimundiringe
- Mukuni S.s.c.f.a
- Mukwada
- Munyoro
- Mupudzi I
- Mupudzi Ii
- Muradzikwa
- Murare
- Mutanda I
- Mutanda Ii
- Mutsago
- Mutupo
- Ngomasha
- Nhamburiko
- Nyachityu
- Nyahundi
- Nyamazura Rs
- Rowa
- Unincorporated Area
- Zimunya

== Mutasa District ==
- Chandisinai
- Chikomba A
- Chikomba B
- Doweguru
- Gondecharodzo
- Mandeya A
- Mandeya B
- Mudwaramaredza
- Mudzindiko
- Muparutsa
- Nyakujara
- Nyamaende
- Nyamhuka
- Rutungagore
- Sadziwa
- Sahumani
- Samanga A
- Samanga B
- Samaringa
- Sanyahwe East
- Sanyahwe West
- Unincorporated Area
- Zindi

== Mutoko District ==
- Charehwa A
- Charehwa B
- Chimoyo A
- Chimoyo B
- Chimoyo C
- Chindenga
- Chiwore
- Gumbure
- Kabasa A
- Kabasa B
- Kawere
- Marira
- Matedza
- Mawanga
- Mbudzi A
- Mbudzi B
- Mutoko Centre
- Nyahondo
- Nyahunure
- Nyamhanza A
- Nyamhanza B
- Nyamuganhu
- Nyamukapa
- Nyamutsahuni
- Nyamuzizi
- Unincorporated Area

== Muzarabani District ==
- Chadereka
- Chawarura
- Chiweshe
- Gutsa
- Hoya
- Hwatsa
- Kapembere
- Machaya
- Muzarabani
- Unincorporated Area

== Mwenezi District ==
- Ward 2
- Ward 3
- Ward 4
- Ward 5
- Ward 6
- Ward 7
- Ward 13
- Ward 18

== Nkayi District ==
- Fanisoni
- Faroni
- Gwampa Forestry
- Jojo East
- Jojo South
- Jojo West
- Kenilworth
- Malandu East
- Malandu West
- Malindi
- Manguni I
- Manguni Ii
- Manomano
- Mlume I
- Mlume Ii
- Mpande
- Ngomambi Central
- Ngomambi North
- Ngomambi South
- Nhlanganiso
- Nkalakatha
- Phillip
- Sibangalwana Ii
- Sibangelana I
- Sikhobokhobo
- Siphunyuka
- Sivalo

== Nyanga District ==
- Sabvure
- Bende
- Chitsanza
- Gairezi Rs
- Gonde
- Guramatunhu
- Marawo
- Mutombwa
- Nyabunje
- Nyadowa
- Nyagota
- Nyajezi
- Nyakomba
- Nyamahumba
- KuNYamaropa
- Nyamasara
- Nyamubarawanda
- Nyamutowera
- Nyanga South
- Nyanga South Rs
- Nyanga Town
- Nyautare
- Ruwangwe
- Rwenya Game Park
- Sanhani/shungu/kuedza
- Sanyatwe
- Tabudirira
- Tombo I
- Tombo Ii
- Tongogara
- Unincorporated Area

== Rushinga District ==
- Bopoma
- Chipara
- Katohwe
- Mahomba
- Makuni
- Maname
- Mapani
- Marambanzara
- Masoso
- Masvingo
- Mukosa
- Nyamanyanya
- Nyamuzeya
- Rukuta
- Rusambo
- Zvingowe

== Seke District ==
- Chirimanhunga
- Eleven
- Mandedza
- Mapfuti
- Marirangwe North
- Marirangwe South
- Matiti
- Mutiusinazita
- Nemasanga
- Ngome
- Twelve
- Unincorporated Area
- Zhakata

== Shamva District ==
- Chidembo
- Chihuri
- Chizinga (nyamaropa)
- Gono
- Goora
- Kajakata
- Mupfure
- Mutumba
- Nyamaruro
- Nyarukunda
- Rukoroori (mufurudzi)
- Sanye
- Shamva Lscfa (umfurudzi N)
- Unincorporated Area

== Shurugwi District ==
- Unincorporated Area
- Ward 1 (Gundura)
- Ward 2 (Ndanga)
- Ward 3 (Donga)
- Ward 4 (Hanke)
- Ward 5 (Nhema)
- Ward 6 (Tinhira)
- Ward 7 (Tongogara)
- Ward 8 (Mazivisa)
- Ward 9 (Shamba)
- Ward 10 (Pisira)

== Tsholotsho District ==
- Unincorporated Area
- Ward 1
- Ward 2
- Ward 3
- Ward 4
- Ward 5
- Ward 6
- Ward 7
- Ward 8
- Ward 9
- Ward 10
- Ward 11
- Ward 12
- Ward 13
- Ward 14
- Ward 15
- Ward 16
- Ward 17
- Ward 18
- Ward 19
- Ward 20

== Umguza District ==
- Fingo
- Ntabazinduna North
- Ntabazinduna South
- Ntabazinduna West
- Unincorporated Area

== Umzingwane District ==
- Habane
- Maplotini
- Crocodile
- Ntabende
- Irisvale
- Sikhoveni
- Dobi
- Dula
- Esibomvu
- Kumbudzi
- Nswazi
- Mathendele
- Mawabeni
- Mpisini
- Mbizingwe
- Shale
- Sigola
- Sihlengeni
- Howmine
- Silobi
- Malabala

== Uzumba-Maramba-Pfungwe ==
- Unincorporated Area

== Zvimba District ==
- Chikambi
- Chimbamauro
- Chivanje
- Dununu
- Mucheka
- Mudapakati
- Nyamangara
- Unincorporated Area
- Ward 4
- Ward 7
- Ward 8
- Ward 9
- Ward 10
- Ward 14
- Ward 19
- Ward 32 Madzimure Tafadzwa
- Mhondongori

== Zvishavane District ==
- Chenhunguru
- Chiwonekano
- Dayadaya
- Guruguru
- Hombe
- Indava
- Lscfa
- Mapirimira
- Mazvihwa
- Mototi
- Murowa
- Mutambe
- Ngomayebani
- Runde
- Shauke
- Shavahuru
- Ture
- Unincorporated Area
- Vukusvo
