= Gungwe =

Gungwe Gongwe
- Village
- Motto(s): Pula Aine (a Babirwa motto meaning rain must fall)
- Location within Zimbabwe
- Coordinates: 21.457894°S 28.886677°E
- Country: Zimbabwe
- Province: Matabeleland South
- District: Gwanda District
- Time zone: UTC+2 (Central Africa Time)

Gungwe(Gongwe) is a village in Gwanda District of Matabeleland South province in southern Zimbabwe.

There is a secondary and primary school, dam, dip-tank, a council hall, clinic, churches and several shops.

The founding Vice-Chancellor of National University of Science and Technology Prof. Phineas Makhurane was born in Gungwe and built his homestead there. The homestead of Chief Mathe is at the village.

The place takes its name from the hill close to the dam. The Bhungapunga river passes through the ward to empty is water in the Thuli river east of the location.
