= Nkwidze =

Nkwidze Nkwidzi
- Village
- Location within Zimbabwe
- Coordinates: 20.735509°S 29.124854°E
- Country: Zimbabwe
- Province: Matabeleland South
- District: Gwanda District
- Time zone: UTC+2 (Central Africa Time)

Nkwidze, occasionally spelled Nkwidzi, is a village in Gwanda District of Matabeleland South province in southern Zimbabwe.

There are shops, a police station and a veterinary services centre. There is a high school (spelled Mkwidze), which was attended by ZIPRA and later state intelligence officer Zenzo Ntuliki.
