= Dite, Zimbabwe =

Dite
- Ward
- Location in Zimbabwe
- Coordinates: 22°13′S 30°23′E
- Country: Zimbabwe
- Province: Matabeleland South
- District: Beitbridge District
- Time zone: UTC+2 (Central Africa Time)

Dite is a ward in Beitbridge District of Matabeleland South province in southern Zimbabwe.
