= Shake, Zimbabwe =

Shake
- Ward
- Interactive map of Shake
- Coordinates: 20.714673°S 29.071865°E
- Country: Zimbabwe
- Province: Matabeleland South
- District: Gwanda District

Population (2022)
  - Total: 4,626
- Time zone: UTC+2 (Central Africa Time)

Shake is a ward in Gwanda District of Matabeleland South province in southern Zimbabwe.
