= Sizeze =

- Village
- Location within Zimbabwe
- Coordinates: 20.884921°S 28.756895°E
- Country: Zimbabwe
- Province: Matabeleland South
- District: Gwanda District
- Time zone: UTC+2 (Central Africa Time)

Sizeze is a village in Gwanda District of Matabeleland South province in southern Zimbabwe.

There are shops and a primary school.
