= Matshetshe =

- Village
- Location within Zimbabwe
- Coordinates: 20°45′16″S 29°09′57″E
- Country: Zimbabwe
- Province: Matabeleland South
- District: Gwanda District
- Time zone: UTC+2 (Central Africa Time)

Matshetshe is a village in Gwanda District of Matabeleland South province in southern Zimbabwe.

There is a primary school, some shops, and an irrigation scheme at Sizabantu Dam.
