= Shashi, Zimbabwe =

Shashi
- Ward
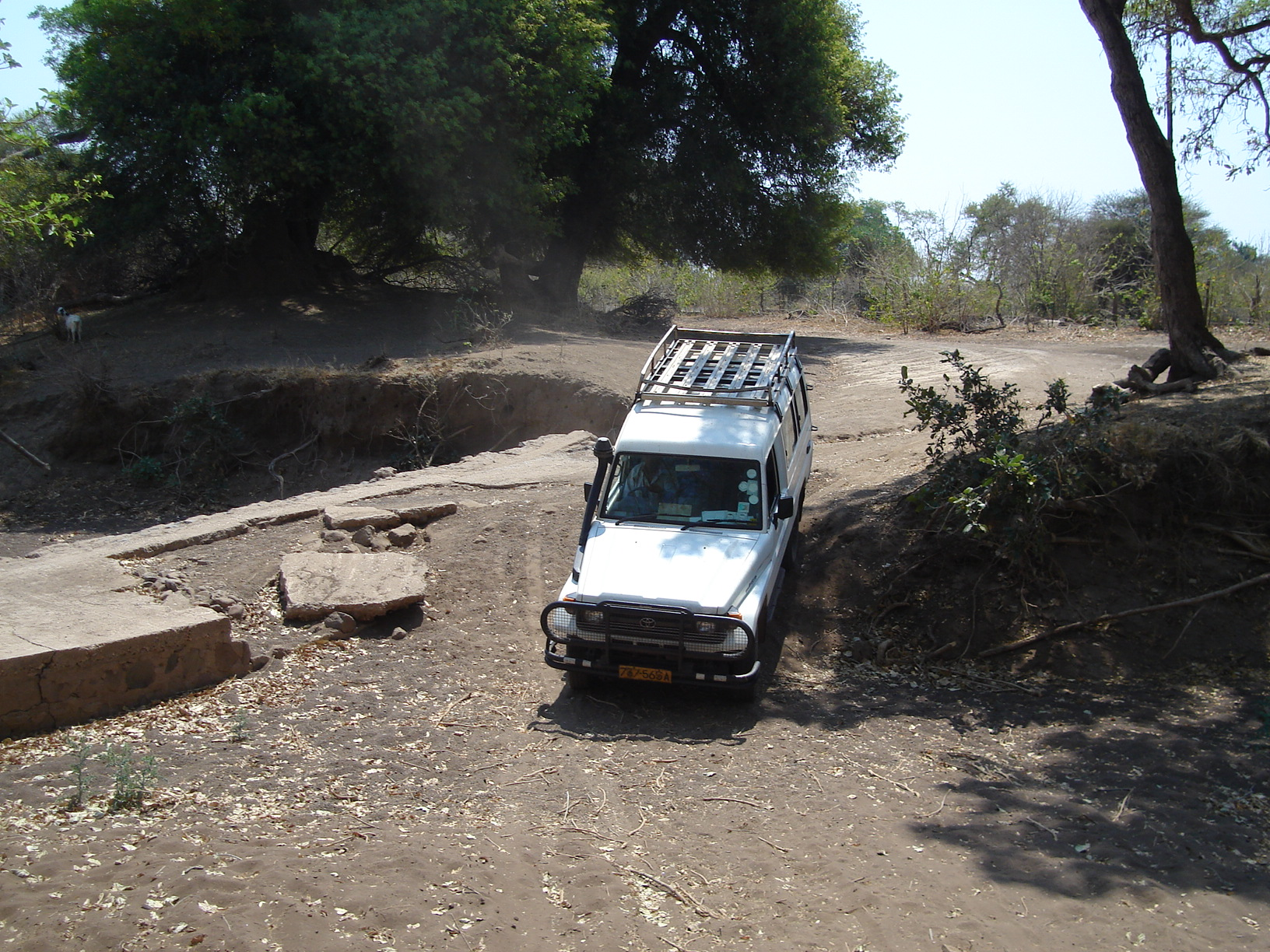
- Damaged river crossing in Maramani Communal Land, Shashi ward

- Location in Zimbabwe
- Coordinates: 22°1′S 29°22′E
- Country: Zimbabwe
- Province: Matabeleland South
- District: Beitbridge District

Population (2022)
  - Total: 4,319
- Time zone: UTC+2 (Central Africa Time)

Shashi is a ward in Beitbridge District of Matabeleland South province in southern Zimbabwe, lying between the Shashe River and Limpopo River at the tripoint between Zimbabwe, Botswana, and South Africa, making the area a well-known informal crossing point.

The ward is serviced by a clinic at Shashi village.
