= Mtshazo =

- Village
- Location within Zimbabwe
- Coordinates: 20°44′23″S 28°51′49″E
- Country: Zimbabwe
- Province: Matabeleland South
- District: Gwanda District
- Time zone: UTC+2 (Central Africa Time)

Mtshazo is a village in Gwanda District of Matabeleland South province in southern Zimbabwe.

There are shops and a furniture workshop at the village, and Mtshabezi Irrigation Scheme is nearby.
