= Masera, Zimbabwe =

Masera
- Ward
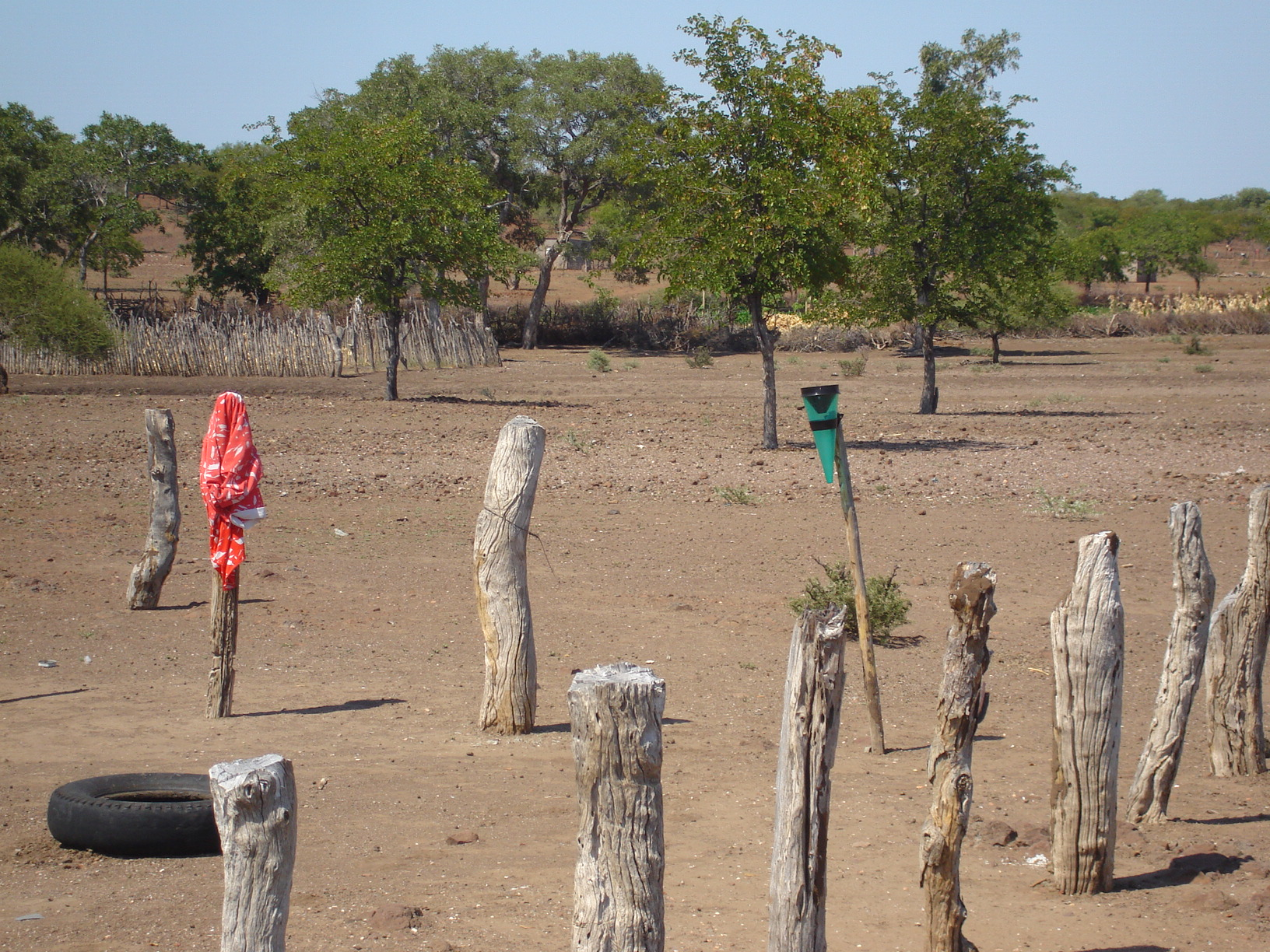
- Village in Masera

- Location in Zimbabwe
- Coordinates: 21°52′S 29°38′E
- Country: Zimbabwe
- Province: Matabeleland South
- District: Beitbridge District
- Elevation: 1,962 ft (598 m)

Population
  - Total: 8,000
- Time zone: UTC+2 (Central Africa Time)

Masera is a ward in Beitbridge District of Matabeleland South province in southern Zimbabwe, with a population of approximately 8,000.
