= Mtetengwe =

- Ward
- Interactive map of Mtetengwe
- Coordinates: 22.075978°S 29.967216°E
- Country: Zimbabwe
- Province: Matabeleland South
- District: Beitbridge District

Population (2021)
  - Total: 8,700 Est.
- Time zone: UTC+2 (Central Africa Time)

Mtetengwe is a ward in Beitbridge District of Matabeleland South province in southern Zimbabwe. The major settlement is Malala village.
