= Lushongwe =

Lushongwe Lushonkwe
- Village
- Location within Zimbabwe
- Coordinates: 21.021552°S 28.795231°E
- Country: Zimbabwe
- Province: Matabeleland South
- District: Gwanda District
- Time zone: UTC+2 (Central Africa Time)

Lushongwe is a village in Gwanda District of Matabeleland South province in southern Zimbabwe.

There is a primary school and an irrigation scheme.

The village is named for the nearby Lushongwe mountain, which is 1044 m in elevation.
