= Sengezane =

- Village
- Location in Zimbabwe
- Coordinates: 21°20′28″S 28°58′25″E
- Country: Zimbabwe
- Province: Matabeleland South
- District: Gwanda District
- Time zone: UTC+2 (Central Africa Time)

Sengezane is a village in Gwanda District of Matabeleland South province in southern Zimbabwe.

There is a primary school, and shops.
