= Mtshabezi Mission =

- Village
- Location in Zimbabwe
- Coordinates: 20.708466°S 28.88001°E
- Country: Zimbabwe
- Province: Matabeleland South
- District: Gwanda District
- Time zone: UTC+2 (Central Africa Time)

Mtshabezi Mission is a village in Gwanda District of Matabeleland South province in southern Zimbabwe.

Mtshabezi Mission is one of the Brethren In Christ Church in Zimbabwe owned missions. The mission has a hospital and a high school that frequently obtains the best school leaving exam results in Zimbabwe. A university is planned for the site not forgetting bible college and a farm.
