= Dendele =

- Ward
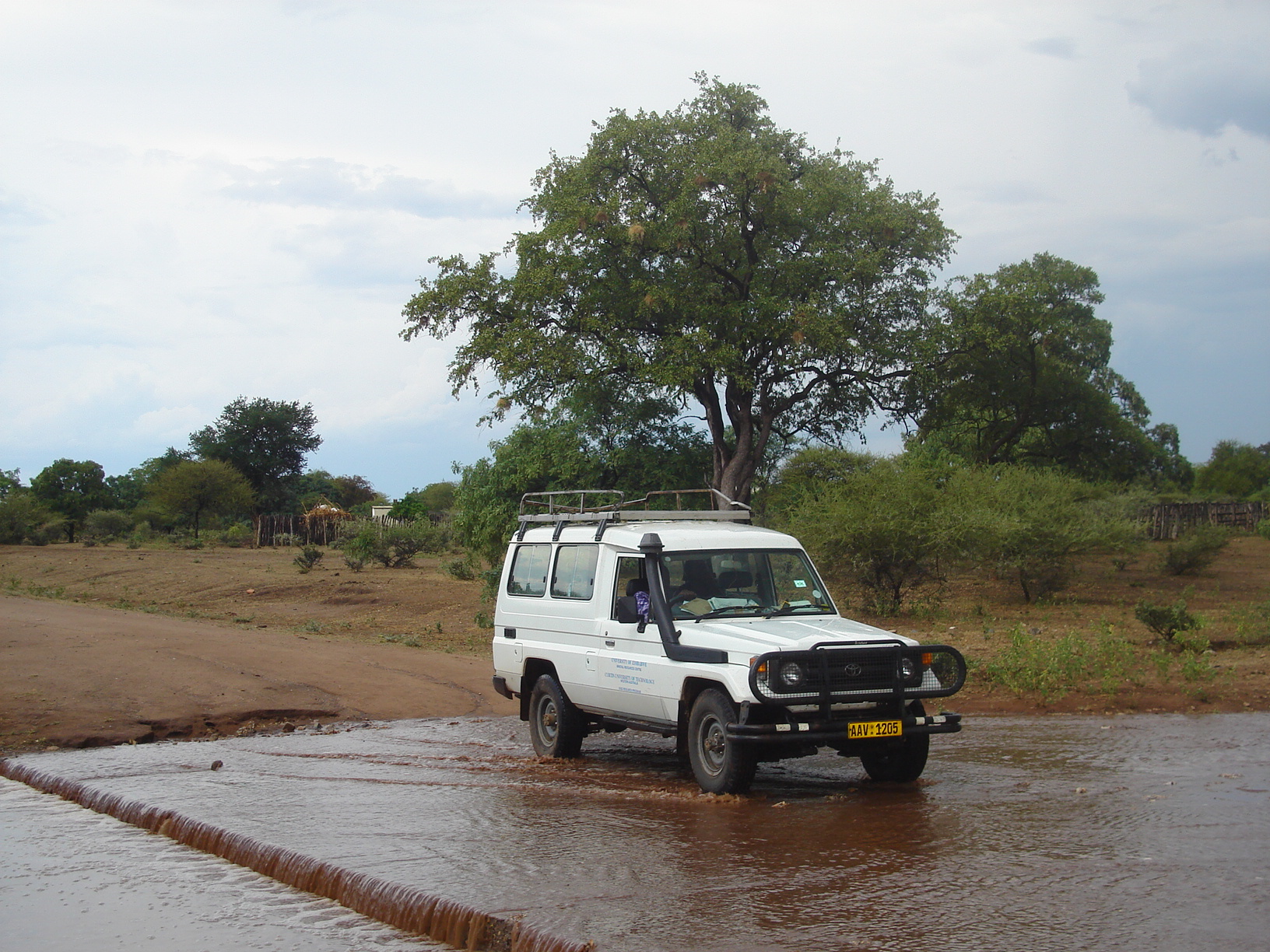
- A river in Dendele

- Location in Zimbabwe
- Coordinates: 21°39′S 29°30′E
- Country: Zimbabwe
- Province: Matabeleland South
- District: Beitbridge District
- Time zone: UTC+2 (Central Africa Time)

Dendele is a ward in Beitbridge District of Matabeleland South province in southern Zimbabwe.
