= Chipise =

- Ward
- Location in Zimbabwe
- Coordinates: 22°14′S 30°56′E
- Country: Zimbabwe
- Province: Matabeleland South
- District: Beitbridge District
- Time zone: UTC+2 (Central Africa Time)

Chipise is a ward in Beitbridge District of Matabeleland South province in southern Zimbabwe.
