= Mzimuni, Zimbabwe =

Mzimuni
- Village
- Location within Zimbabwe
- Coordinates: 20°38′57″S 29°08′10″E
- Country: Zimbabwe
- Province: Matabeleland South
- District: Gwanda District
- Time zone: UTC+2 (Central Africa Time)

Mzimuni is a village in Gwanda District of Matabeleland South province in southern Zimbabwe.

There is a clinic, Mzimuni High School, Glass Block 1 Primary School, and shops.
