= Silonga =

Silonga Selonga
- Village
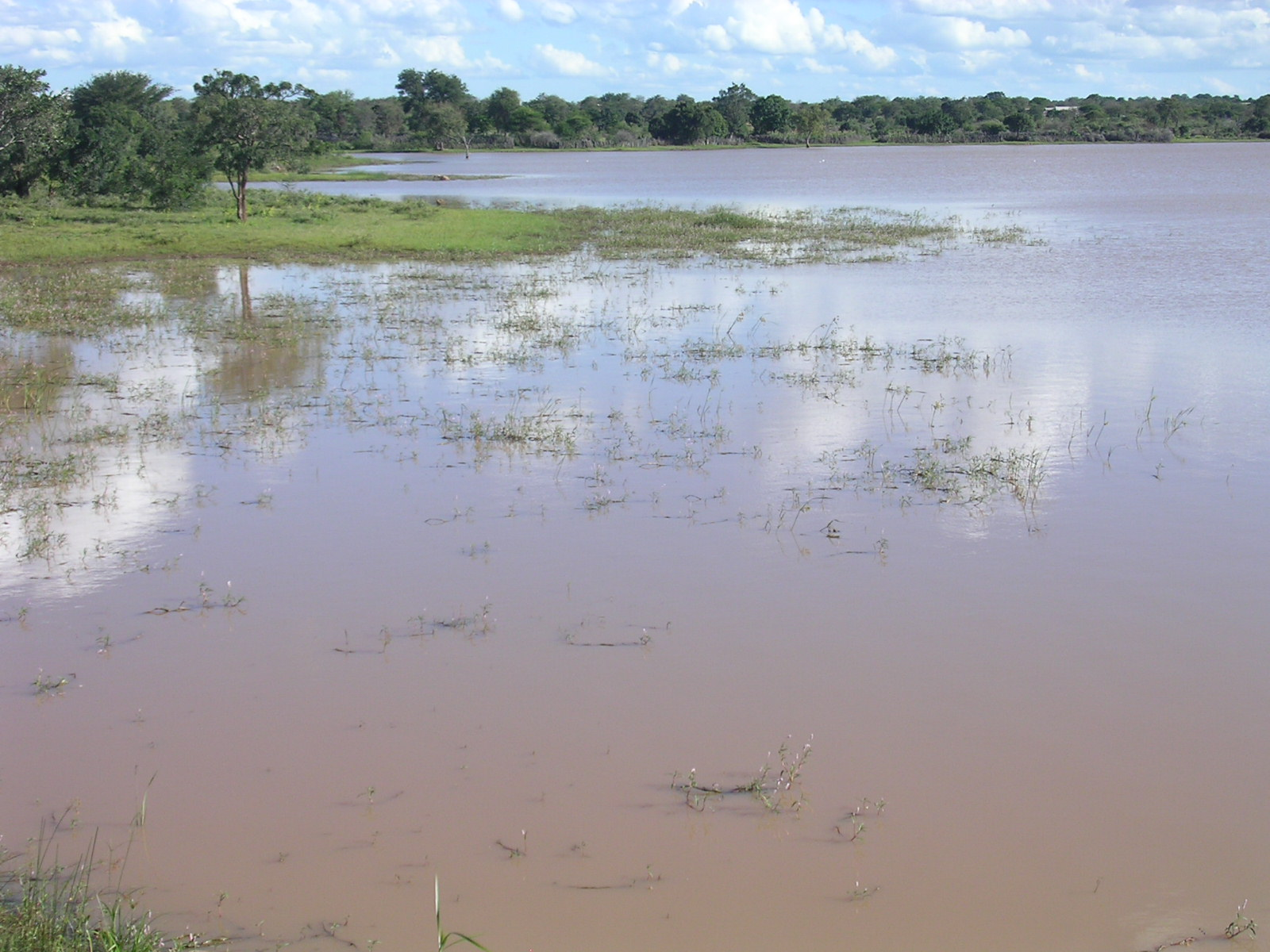
- Dam at Silonga, buildings of the village in the background

- Location within Zimbabwe
- Coordinates: 21°22′58″S 29°10′27″E
- Country: Zimbabwe
- Province: Matabeleland South
- District: Gwanda District
- Time zone: UTC+2 (Central Africa Time)

Silonga is a village in Gwanda District of Matabeleland South province in southern Zimbabwe.

There are shops, a primary school, a secondary school, a clinic, and a dam with an irrigation scheme.

Lutheran minister, United African National Council activist and later headmaster of Manama High School headmaster, Arote Vellah-Ncube was born in Silonga.
