= Chamnangana =

- Ward
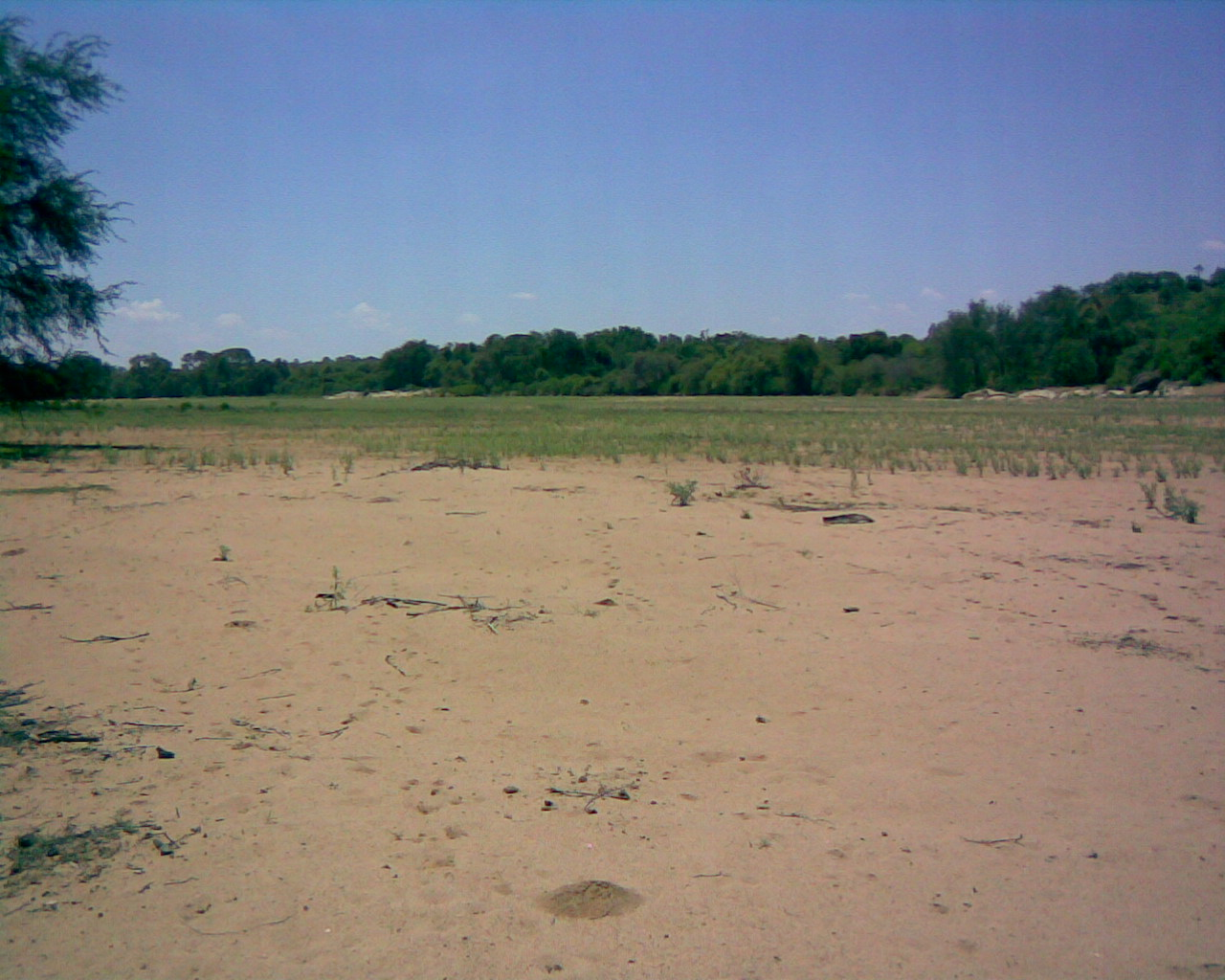
- Mzingwane River at Bwaemura, western part of Chamnanga ward, Zimbabwe

- Location in Zimbabwe
- Coordinates: 21°45′S 29°40′E
- Country: Zimbabwe
- Province: Matabeleland South
- District: Beitbridge District

Population (2022)
  - Total: 8,070
- Time zone: UTC+2 (Central Africa Time)

Chamnangana is a ward in Beitbridge District of Matabeleland South province in southern Zimbabwe. It lies between the Jopembi Mounntain and the Mzingwane River.
