= Simbumbumbu =

Simbumbumbu Enqameni
- Village
- Location within Zimbabwe
- Coordinates: 20°44′52″S 28°45′31″E
- Country: Zimbabwe
- Province: Matabeleland South
- District: Gwanda District

Government
  - Chief: Khulumani Mathema
- Time zone: UTC+2 (Central Africa Time)

Simbumbumbu is a village in Gwanda District, Matabeleland South Province, in southern Zimbabwe.

There is a clinic, a primary school, a high school, and shops. Infrastructure in the village has been improved by projects from Family Impact, UNICEF, World Vision, and Dabane Trust.

The area falls under Chief Khulumani Mathema.
