= Majini =

- Ward
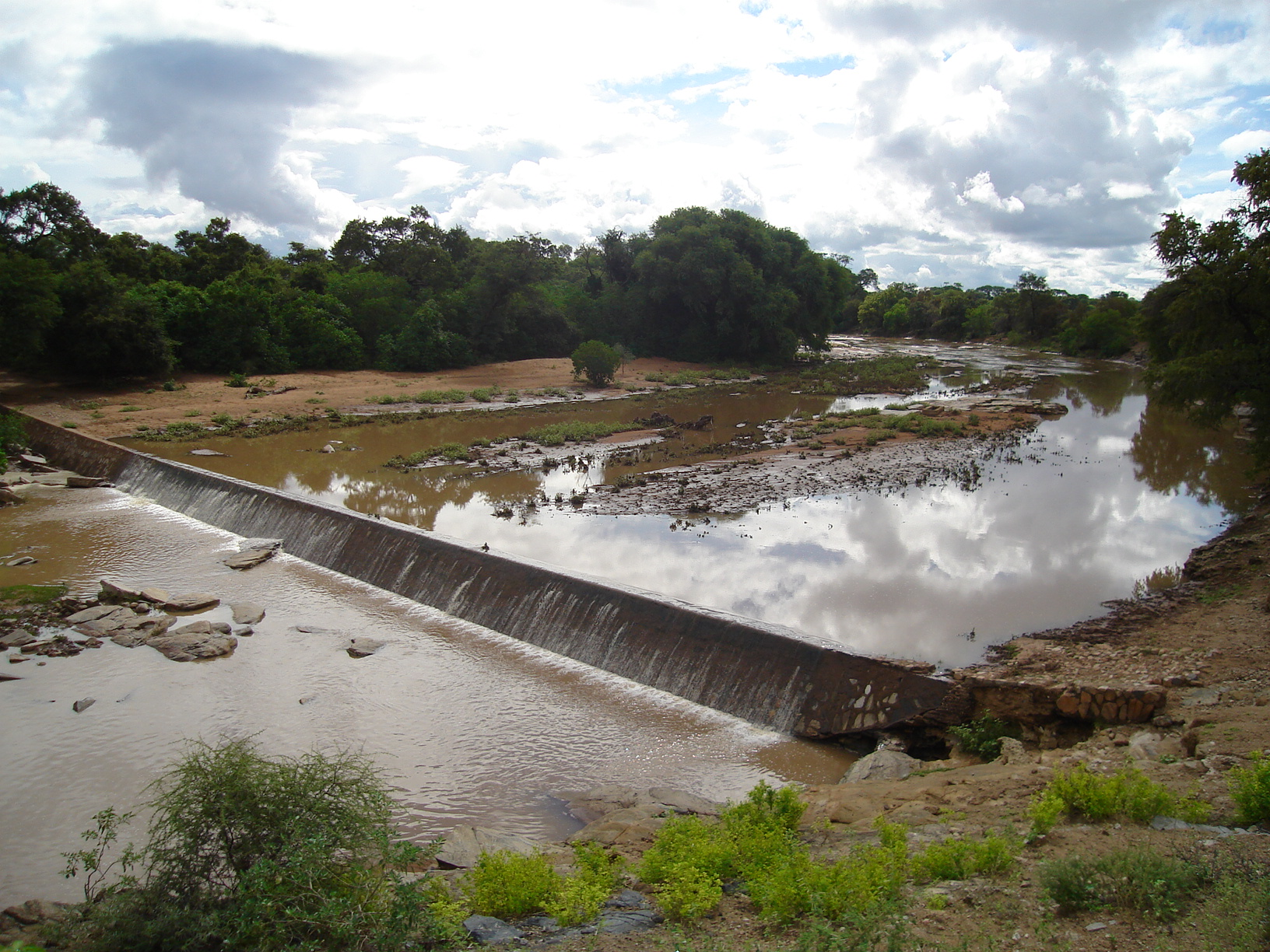
- A weir on the Umtshabezi River in Majini

- Location in Zimbabwe
- Coordinates: 21.537973°S 29.720902°E
- Country: Zimbabwe
- Province: Matabeleland South
- District: Beitbridge District

Government

Population (2021)
  - Total: 6,678 Est.
- Time zone: UTC+2 (Central Africa Time)

Majini is a ward in Beitbridge District of Matabeleland South province in southern Zimbabwe. It lies in the Siyoka Communal Land at the foot of the Jopempi mountain, south of Makhado police station on the R9 Beitbridge-Bulawayo highway.
