= Machuchuta =

- Ward
- Location in Zimbabwe
- Coordinates: 21.866011°S 29.402389°E
- Country: Zimbabwe
- Province: Matabeleland South
- District: Beitbridge District

Population (2022)
  - Total: 5,004
- Time zone: UTC+2 (Central Africa Time)

Machuchuta is a ward in Beitbridge District of Matabeleland South province in southern Zimbabwe.

The ward is serviced by a clinic at Swereki village.

The southern half of the Tuli Circle, and Thuli Parks and Wildlife Land lie in the west of the ward, and form a core component of the Greater Mapungubwe Transfrontier Conservation Area.
