= Mukumbura =

- Village
- Map showing Mukumbura in Zimbabwe
- Coordinates: 16°12′S 31°41′E
- Country: Zimbabwe
- Province: Mashonaland Central
- District: Mount Darwin District

Population (2007)
  - Total: 30,470
- Time zone: UTC+2 (Central Africa Time)
- Area code: +2122200
- Climate: Semi-arid

Mukumbura is a village in the Mt Darwin District, located in the Mashonaland Central Province of Zimbabwe.

== Economy ==
As a remote and marginal area of Zimbabwe, Mukumbura is categorised as "poverty-stricken and limited in socio-economic growth". Acting as the border crossing between Mozambique and Zimbabwe, women usually take advantage of their proximity to Mozambique to acquire secondhand goods from Mozambique at a lower price and resell them in Zimbabwe at a higher price that then allows them to maximise profits. Men and women undertake small businesses in order to sustain themselves in the current economic hardships of Zimbabwe.

=== Agriculture ===
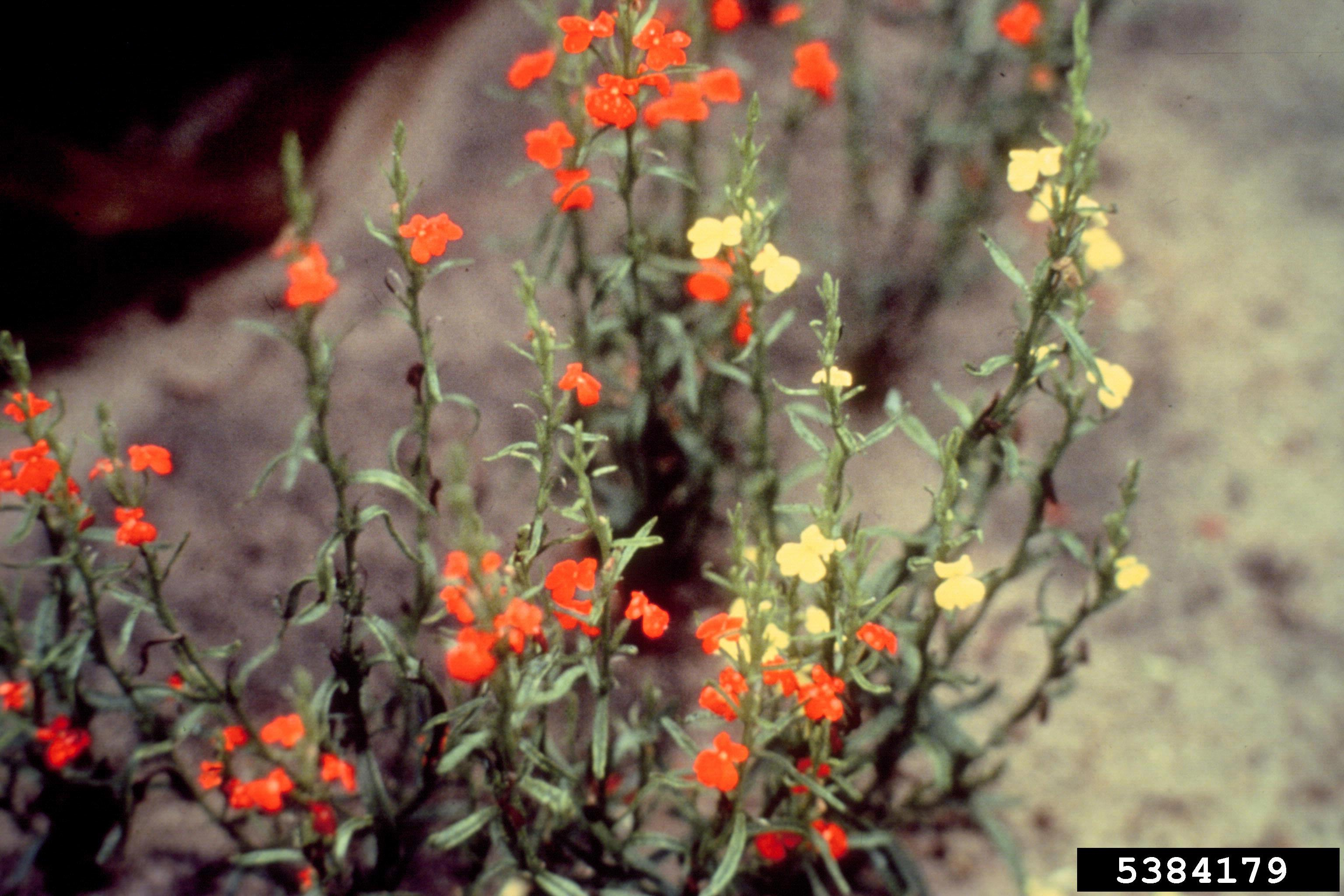
Striga asiatica

The major economic activities of Mukumbura are livestock farming and crop production which are also done typically for subsistence. The area of Mukumbura lies within a region that is determined as a 'semi-extensive farming' region, presented through the Zimbabwean agro-ecological classification. In general, the soils are sandy and contain an acidic pH as a result of poor management by the farmers who take part in constant cultivation without replenishment of nutrients. The main crops grown in the Mukumbura areas and communal lands include millets, maize, tobacco, sorghum, cowpeas and beans which are determined by the topo-climatic conditions of the area. Cattle are mainly used to plough the fields.

Surveys carried out in Mukumbura areas found that farmers were able to identify Striga asiatica, a parasitic weed, and its variants present within their fields and soil. The parasitic plants had many plant hosts including cowpeas, common beans, maize, sorghum, millets, tobacco and Ricardia scabra. As this represents all the crop plants that are cultivated by the farmers in these areas, the farmers' food security is at a serious risk and threat by these parasitic weeds which latch onto the roots of the host plants, leading to reduced yields or complete crop failure.

=== Water and sanitation ===
Water sources can be unsafe due to the underground landmines that contribute to environmental pollution. The majority of the water in the areas is contaminated, and if precautions aren't taken it exposes people to health hazards. Sources of water for domestic purposes and cooking for rural people then tend to be mainly from wells, boreholes and rivers. However, there is decreased reliability of these water sources during the dry seasons as a result of many factors, with reduced groundwater being one of them. During the dry season, livestock is also watered from the boreholes. Furthermore, Water Point Committees (WPCs), which are local community management groups, exist for all the area's boreholes. WPCs are the lowest institution in the management of rural water supply. It is claimed that these committees are not entirely effective in managing the maintenance and operation of the boreholes because of poor record keeping and incapacity to mobilise the community when the boreholes break down.

In 2003, an international non-governmental organisation implemented a new water supply project for Mukumbura communal lands. The objective of the water project was to increase accessibility to water and thereby reduce waterborne diseases. The project planned to rehabilitate 52 of the non-functional boreholes in Mukumbura while also drilling 21 new boreholes.

=== Tourism ===
The area of Sheba forest, Musengezi border posts and Mukumbura, which are densely populated with landmines, have a potential of attracting tourists as a result of their significant historical sites, favourable and pleasant weather, perennial rivers and small to medium game parks. Areas that have been infested with landmines become an obstacle and defer these potential tourist activities that would help generate foreign currency for the country and village.

==== Mukumbura Border Post ====
Mukumbura Border Control lies between Zimbabwe and Mozambique. Mecumbira is situated on the Mozambican side of the border. On each side, the borders are separated by the Rio Mukumbura River. It was reported in mid-2012 that there was little activity at the border post and that the perimeter fence between the two counties was washed away as a result of the Mukumbura River flooding. The border operates from 6am-6pm (GMT+2). When visiting and entering Zimbabwe, all visitors are required to present a valid passport, and original vehicle registration papers and licence when travelling with a vehicle. If the visitor is driving a vehicle not their own, they must provide an affidavit signed by the owner that authorises its use by another person as well as third-party insurance. Payments in USD or ZAR are made for road access fees that are based on vehicle size, and a carbon pollution fee.

== Geography ==
Low rainfall combined with the high temperatures (over 25 degrees Celsius) means that there is a limited amount of surface water resources even throughout normal seasons. The land itself is primarily flat, locally dissected and stony. The soil is mainly residual, well-drained, shallow to moderately deep fine-grained sandloams over brown to yellowish-red sand.

== Effects of the Rhodesian Bush War ==
Because of the Rhodesian Bush War almost a quarter of a million African people in Rhodesia were strategically resettled into protected/consolidated villages which dictated many aspects of people's lives. This resettlement was called Operation Overload. By the end of 1974, multiple protected and consolidated villages were set up, and this included the Mukumbura Protected Village, which had three closely knit fenced-on camps, holding around 4,300 people. Mukumbura was chosen as a prime exemplar and regarded as a showpiece by the government to show to journalists and other important visitors how the government has implemented and maintained protection for its people. Some of the local women were also trained by the administration as community workers in order to teach simple domestic skills to the women in these protected villages.

== Demographic ==
As a consequence of the landmines and the danger they present, many people live in constant fear that is breeding uncertainties in the future of those settled in the area. This safety issue that is impacting individuals, as well as prospects for development, is pushing residents to move and settle in safer places, such as Rushinga and Mutare communal areas, which are becoming increasingly densely populated due to this. Naturally, Mukumbura has faced a growing underpopulation as a landmine-infested area.

== In popular culture ==
Mukumbura was immortalized in the song "It's a Long Way to Mukumbura" by Mike Westcott and Leprechaun. The 1977 song is set to the music of the British song "It's a Long Way to Tipperary". It rose to #2 on the Rhodesian hit music charts. The song expressed, in humorous form, the physical distance to Mukumbura from other parts of the country while also celebrating the contributions made by different branches of the Rhodesian armed forces to the Rhodesian Bush War.
