= Kafusi =

Coordinates: 21.60116°S 28.774733°E

- Village
- Interactive map of Kafusi
- Country: Zimbabwe
- Province: Matabeleland South
- District: Gwanda District
- Time zone: UTC+2 (Central Africa Time)

Location of Kafusi

Kafusi is a village in Gwanda District of Matabeleland South province in southern Zimbabwe. The village has shops and a high school.

Kafusi is the birthplace of musician Albert Nyathi.
