= Buvuma =

- Village
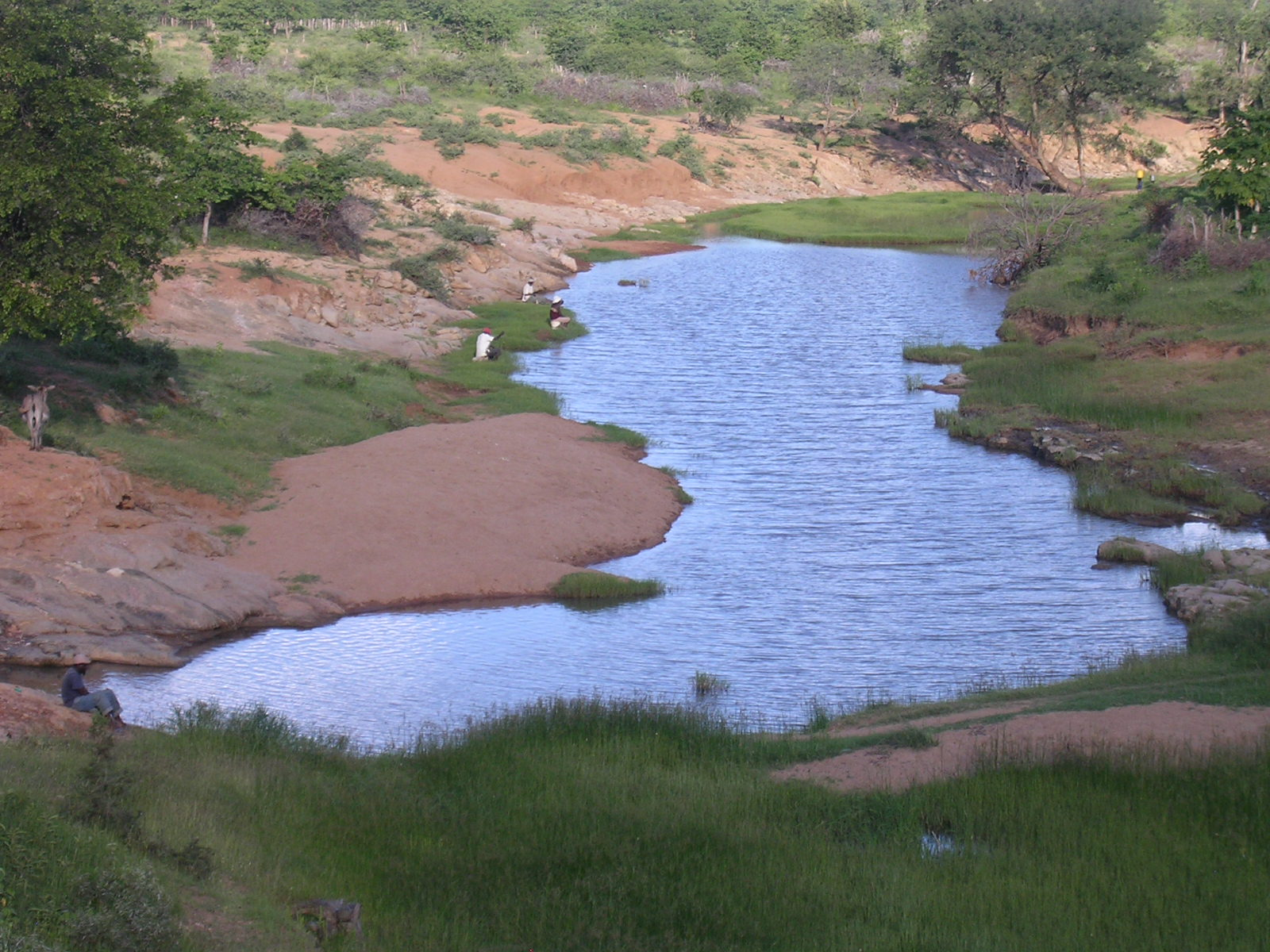
- Fishing near Buvuma

- Location within Zimbabwe
- Coordinates: 21.466124°S 29.195207°E
- Country: Zimbabwe
- Province: Matabeleland South
- Time zone: UTC+2 (Central Africa Time)

Buvuma is a village in Gwanda District of Matabeleland South province in southern Zimbabwe. It is located on the road from Gwanda to Manama.

There is a shopping centre, a clinic, and a high school.

Lutheran evangelist and member of Parliament of Zimbabwe, Eliah Masiyane was born in Buvuma.
