= Albert Nyathi =

Zimbabwean artist

- Born: Albert Nyathi; 15 November 1962 (age 63); Gwanda
- Education: University of Zimbabwe
- Occupations: Poet, musician, philanthropist

Albert Nyathi (born 15 November 1962 at Kafusi in Gwanda District in Matabeleland South) is a Zimbabwean poet, musician, writer, actor, and philanthropist. Nyathi is particularly famous for the poem and song "Senzeni na?", which he composed following the assassination of Chris Hani. Nyathi is married to Caroline and they have three children together.

== Education ==
For his secondary education, Nyathi attended Msitheli Secondary School and Matopo High School. He then attended the University of Zimbabwe, where he graduated with an honours degree in English literature in the mid-1990s.

== Career ==
Nyathi started praise poetry as a very young boy when he used to sing praise poetry while herding cattle in Gwanda. Over the years, he has expanded his audience to include other African countries and countries beyond the Africa continent. Nyathi performed in South Africa saying praises about the Great King of the Ndebele and founder of the Mthwakazi Kingdom, Mzilikazi. He has toured several countries including Botswana, Zambia, United States, Russia, Denmark, the Netherlands, and South Africa.

== Published books ==
- My Son
- My Daughter
