= Mashoko =

- Ward
- Location in Zimbabwe
- Coordinates: 20°29′S 31°46′E
- Country: Zimbabwe
- Province: Masvingo Province
- District: Bikita District

Population (2021)
  - Total: 9,438
- Time zone: UTC+2 (Central Africa Time)

Mashoko is a ward in Bikita District of Masvingo Province in south-eastern Zimbabwe.

The ward is served by Mukanga clinic.
