= Murwira =

- Ward
- Interactive map of Murwira
- Country: Zimbabwe
- Province: Masvingo Province
- District: Bikita District

Population (2022)
  - Total: 6,071
- Time zone: UTC+2 (Central Africa Time)

Murwira is a ward in Bikita District of Masvingo Province in south-eastern Zimbabwe.

The ward is served by Murwira clinic.
