= Gangare =

- Ward
- Interactive map of Gangare
- Coordinates: 19.917086°S 31.817458°E
- Country: Zimbabwe
- Province: Masvingo Province
- District: Bikita District

Population (2021)
  - Total: 5,143 Est.
- Time zone: UTC+2 (Central Africa Time)
  - Summer (DST): UTC-,

Gangare is a ward in Bikita District of Masvingo Province in south-eastern Zimbabwe. Its name is derived from a large nearby mountain in that area.

Traditionally, Gangare shares part of jurisdiction between Chief Mazungunye and Mukanganwi. Currently, Nyange or Gomba is the Headman of the area.

The Gangare Ngororombe Traditional dance has its origins in Gangare is popular at gatherings such as Independence Day, Field Day, ritual ceremonies, marriage ceremonies and traditional beer gatherings, and is taught in schools in the area.

The area is served by Gangare Clinic, as well as Gangare Primary School and Chisungo High School.
