= List of Zimbabwean provinces by Human Development Index =

This is a list of Zimbabwean provinces by Human Development Index as of 2022.

Rank	Province	HDI (2022)
Medium human development
1	Bulawayo	0.649
2	Harare	0.622
–	Zimbabwe	0.550
Low human development
3	Midlands	0.547
4	Masvingo	0.545
5	Matabeleland South	0.542
6	Manicaland	0.539
7	Mashonaland East	0.538
8	Mashonaland West	0.519
9	Matabeleland North	0.499
10	Mashonaland Central	0.495
