= Figtree, Zimbabwe =

Coordinates: 20°22′05″S 28°19′45″E

Figtree is a town in Bulilima District in the province of Matabeleland South, Zimbabwe.

It is located about 37 km south-west of Bulawayo on the main Bulawayo-Plumtree road. The town is named after a wild fig tree which in the 19th century those wishing to enter the Matabele Kingdom had to wait by this tree for permission to proceed. The one and the only tollgate of Bulawayo-Plumtree highway is located in Figtree and after this tollgate towards Plumtree there is Figtree business center, about 100m off the main road to the west. About 4 km from Figtree there is a Bazha turn, unpaved road which connects to Matopo-Kezi-Maphisa road. Francistown(Botswana) is a major town located close to Figtree and is 155 km away from Francistown.

Figtree is in Bulilima District of Matebeleland South. It is the 19th Ward in the district. According to The 2022 Population and Housing Census Preliminary Report on Population Figures, Figtree has a total population of 4917 people: 2384 males and 2533 females. It is the 6th largest amongst the 22 wards in Bulilima District which has a total population of 85600 people.

Figtree currently has one small residential suburb called Garikai/ Hlalanikuhle which is controlled by the Bulilima Rural District Council. The suburb is located next to a police station.

Masotsha Primary School is also located in Figtree.
