= Marondera District =

Marondera District Marandellas District
- second-level administrative subdivision
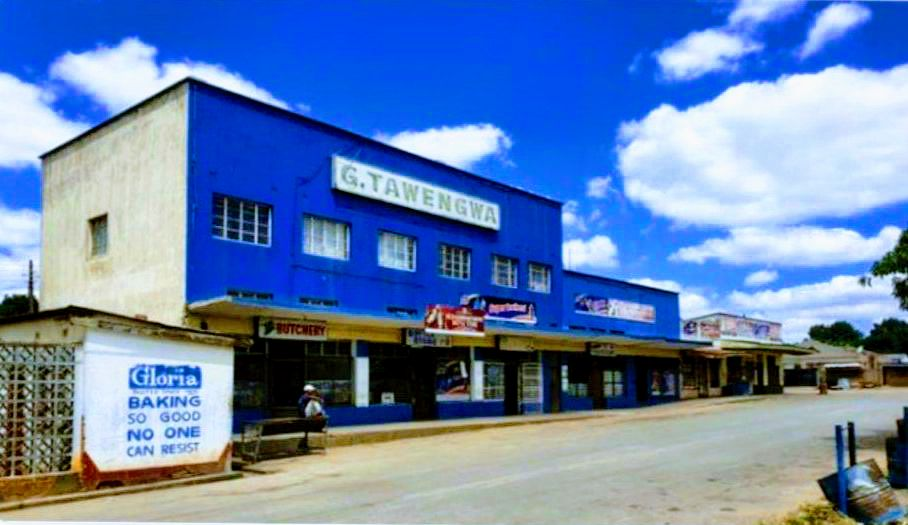
- Shopping centre in Marondera
- Interactive map of Marondera District
- Coordinates: 18°15′0″S 31°30′0″E
- Country: Zimbabwe
- Province: Mashonaland East
- District: Marondera

Population (2012)
  - Total: 199,607
- Time zone: UTC+1 (CET)
  - Summer (DST): UTC+1 (CEST)

Marondera, originally known as Marandellas, is a district of Mashonaland East Province, Zimbabwe, in southern Africa. It is located in the eastern part of Zimbabwe, and covers an unknown area. The district capital is the town of Marondera, which is also the provincial capital.

== Geography ==
Marondera District is divided into four parliamentary constituencies: Marondera East constituency, Marondera West constituency, Marondera Central constituency, and a small northern portion of Wezda North constituency (most of which is in Wedza District). Marondera Central comprises only Marondera Town. Marondera West constituency comprises the Chihota communal area and includes the business centres at Mahusekwa, Chiwanzamarara and Manyaira. Marondera East constituency comprises the Svosve communal lands, and the Rhodesclarke, Chitangazuva, Waddilove, Musi and Mukute, Surrey and Dambi Estates areas.

Rivers in the district include the Save, the Mtoromanzi, and the Nyakambiri.
