= Esimbomvu =

Coordinates: 20°24′S 28°54′E

Esimbomvu (its original name (with diacritics) is Esibomv) is a village in the province of Matabeleland South, Zimbabwe. It is located about 40 km south-east of Bulawayo just south of the Umzingwane Dam.
