= Operation Overload =

- Part of the Rhodesian Bush War (or Second Chimurenga)
Date	27 July 1974
Location	Rhodesia
Result	Rhodesian victory

Belligerents
Rhodesia	ZANLA

Commanders and leaders
(Rhodesia) Ian Smith	Unknown

Units involved
Rhodesian Army	Unknown

Strength
	Unknown

Operation Overload was a forced resettlement operation conducted by the Rhodesian Army that took place over six weeks starting on 27 July 1974. It aimed to separate civilians from the guerrillas whom they typically supported.

== Resettlement ==
Operation Overload was undertaken to block what appeared to be an advance by ZANLA insurgents from the Chiweshe Tribal Trust Land towards the Rhodesian capital of Sailsbury during early 1974. The residents of these areas had previously been subjected to collective punishment by the Rhodesian government in 1973 in a failed attempt to deter them from supporting the insurgents.

As part of the operation, all the 49,960 residents of the Chiweshe Tribal Trust Land were forced to move into 21 protected villages. The Rhodesian Army and Police transported the civilians to their new villages, where they were required to construct new homes with materials salvaged from their previous homes. All of the huts in the evacuated areas where then destroyed by the Rhodesian Security Forces. The civilians who were forced to move did not receive any compensation.

Residents of the northern part of the Chiweshe Tribal Trust Land were generally willing to move voluntarily into the protected villages as they had been intimidated by the insurgents. Many residents of the southern part of the Chiweshe Tribal Trust Land resisted the forced relocations.

The relocations were completed on 15 August 1974. All of the protected villages had inadequate sanitation facilities, which led to disease, and they were not well protected from the insurgents.

"In the short term, benefits seemed substantial," says Cilliers, "as insurgent activities were severely disrupted in Chiweshe for the following six months". The security forces immediately set about a similar operation called Overload Two in the Madziwa Tribal Trust Lands. This involved 13,500 civilians being relocated into eight protected villages.

== Aftermath ==
Although initially successful, the protected villages ultimately proved counter-productive for the security forces. Cilliers cites the "lack of emphasis on concurrent socio-economic conditions" as a negative factor, pointing out the lack of sanitation and other facilities in most of the villages, as well as the fact that they were not sufficiently guarded. Wood agrees, saying that the villages "were never adequately policed or protected and the people were not involved in their management or persuaded of their necessity." Because of the inadequate financial backing for the PVs they were not developed properly, and their locations were often too far from the fields where the villagers grew their crops.

The village administration was poor to the extent that in numerous cases ZANLA insurgents were able to use them as hiding places. "Most important of all," Wood concludes, the protected villages "took the people away from the burial sites of their ancestors, which they venerated." The PVs lasted until 1978, when they were dismantled. This combined with the effectiveness of the recently formed Selous Scouts to reduce ZANLA influence in the area and force the cadres back to the north, towards Mozambique.
