= Mazowe District =

- second-level administrative subdivision
- Interactive map of Mazowe District
- Coordinates: 17°10′0″S 31°0′0″E
- Country: Zimbabwe
- Province: Mashonaland Central
- District: Mazowe

Area
  - Total: 4,354 km^{2} (1,681 sq mi)
- Elevation: 1,217 m (3,993 ft)

Population (2022 census)
  - Total: 293,363
  - Density: 67.38/km^{2} (174.5/sq mi)
- Time zone: UTC+1 (CET)
  - Summer (DST): UTC+1 (CEST)

Mazowe District is the southernmost of seven districts of Mashonaland Central province in Zimbabwe. The district has no defined capital but has various growing small towns of Mazowe, Glendale, Concession and Nzvimbo Growth Point. It has a mixture of commercial farms and rural settlement. Of late the most part of commercial farms is taken up by the resettlement area after the land resettlement program.

Mazowe District is in region 2 of farming area where farming is the backbone of the economy. Crops such as maize, tobacco, are the main source of income with cotton and other traditional crops being farmed. Animal husbandry is also practiced.

Mazowe District has a number of ever flowing streams/rivers that from eastwards. There is Mazowe dam and several other man-made dams that makes this region be abundant in water.

Gold mining is heavily practiced in Mazowe and that has led to land degradation that needs to be attended to by land restorers.

The road network in Mazowe is comprised by one major highway from Harare that later splits into two major highways in the District making the movement of good easy and affordable.

The district bosts of the best weather in the country and it rearly receives below average rainfall. It has major tourist attractions through its Chimurenga War history. Mazowe was an integral part in the war of liberation. There are historical places like Nyota Mountains, that was the fortress of the Great African Warrior, Kadungure Mapondera. Gonhi mountains where the first gunfighting was witnessed in the 1970s.
