= Murehwa District =

Coordinates: 17°48′S 31°50′E

- Second-level administrative subdivision
- Interactive map of Murehwa District
- Country: Zimbabwe
- Province: Mashonaland East

Area
  - Land: 3,556 km^{2} (1,373 sq mi)

Population (2022 census)
  - Total: 205,440
  - Density: 57.77/km^{2} (149.6/sq mi)
- Time zone: UTC+2 (CAT)
  - Summer (DST): UTC+2 (CAT)

Murehwa District is a district of the Province Mashonaland East in Zimbabwe.
