= Gwai =

Coordinates: 19°17′S 27°39′E

Gwai is a village and forested area in the province of Matabeleland South, Zimbabwe. It is located around 135 km north-west of Bulawayo. The village is named after the local river and is derived from the Ndebele word meaning tobacco. The Gwai River Inn was a popular stop on the road between Bulawayo and Victoria Falls, but is now a shell following its destruction in a fire.

The area has a large hardwood forest known as the Gwai Forest Reserve.
