= Chihuri =

Chihuri is a Zimbabwean surname. Notable people with the surname include:

- Augustine Chihuri, a commissioner-general of the Zimbabwe Republic Police
- Kennedy Chihuri, a Zimbabwean footballer
