= Takawira =

Takawira is a Zimbabwean surname that may refer to

- Bernard Takawira (1948–1997), Zimbabwean sculptor, brother of John
- Gerald Takawira (1964–2004), Zimbabwean sculptor, son of John
- John Takawira (1938–1989), Zimbabwean sculptor, father of John
- Lazarus Takawira (1952–2021), Zimbabwean sculptor
- Leopold Takawira (1916–1970), Vice-President of the Zimbabwe African National Union
- Moffat Takadiwa (born 1983), Zimbabwean sculptor
- Vitalis Takawira (born 1972), Zimbabwean football player

== See also ==
- Takawira Rural District Council in Zimbabwe
