= Ellen Chiweshe =

- Born: 1967 (age 58–59); Wedza District, Zimbabwe
- Military career
- Allegiance: Zimbabwe
- Branch: Air Force of Zimbabwe
- Service years: 1988-present
- Rank: Air Commodore

Air Commodore Ellen Chiweshe (born 1967) is an officer of the Air Force of Zimbabwe.

Born in Wedza District, Zimbabwe, Chiweshe attended St. Anne's Goto Primary and Secondary and Mutare Girls High School before graduating from Women's University in Africa with a Master of Business Administration and an Executive Diploma in Business Management. She also graduated from the Kenya National Defence College with a Diploma in international studies and a National Defence course certification.

She was promoted to the rank of air commodore by President Robert Mugabe on 3 January 2016; the first woman to be promoted to that rank. She had previously held the rank of group captain. After her promotion she became the third highest-ranking officer in the air force.

Her promotion ceremony was presided over by Air Marshal Perrance Shiri, commander of the air force. Shiri stated "the sky is the limit. There is nothing that can stop women from attaining high posts" and that "Air Commodore Chiweshe was promoted not because of bias or favour but because of her competency".

She then became the first female commander of the Jason Ziyaphapha Moyo Air Force Base, and the second female commander of a Zimbabwe air base, in 2025.
