= Chimedza =

Chimedza is a Zimbabwean surname. Notable people with the surname include:

- Albert Chimedza, a Zimbabwean poet
- Cephas Chimedza, a Zimbabwean footballer
- Paul Chimedza, the President of the Zimbabwe Medical Association and a politician
