= Chikwanda =

Chikwanda is a surname. Notable people with the surname include:

- Alexander Chikwanda (1938–2022), Zambian politician
- Justin Chikwanda (born 1967), Zambian boxer
- Square Chikwanda (born 1972), Zimbabwean sculptor
