= Muzarabani District =

Coordinates: 15°45′S 29°20′E

- second-level administrative subdivision
- Interactive map of Muzarabani District
- Country: Zimbabwe
- Province: Mashonaland Central

Area
  - Total: 4,266 km^{2} (1,647 sq mi)

Population (2022 census)
  - Total: 134,076
  - Density: 31.43/km^{2} (81.40/sq mi)
- Time zone: UTC+1 (CET)
  - Summer (DST): UTC+1 (CEST)

Muzarabani is a district, which is relatively flat and situated along the Mozambique-Zimbabwe border in Mashonaland Central province in Zimbabwe.
