= Nyota =

Nyota is a given name. It means star in the African languages Swahili and Lingala.

It may refer to:

- Nyota Inyoka (1896–1971), French-Indian dancer and choreographer
- Nyota Ndogo, Kenyan musician
- Nyota Mulcare, Montserratian politician
- Nyota Uhura, a fictional character in the original Star Trek series
- Nyota (bonobo), a male Bonobo born at the Language Research Center at Georgia State University and used for research

Nyota also means thirst in the Shona language, a dialect spoken in Zimbabwe.
