= Rushinga District =

Rushinga District korekore
- District
- Nickname: rush
- Interactive map of Rushinga District
- Coordinates: 16°40′0″S 32°15′0″E
- Country: Zimbabwe
- Province: Mashonaland Central
- District: Rushinga

Area
  - Total: 2,328 km^{2} (899 sq mi)
- Elevation: 730 m (2,400 ft)

Population (2022 census)
  - Total: 76,876
  - Density: 33.02/km^{2} (85.53/sq mi)
- Time zone: UTC+1 (CET)
  - Summer (DST): UTC+1 (CEST)

Rushinga is one of seven districts in the Mashonaland Central province of Zimbabwe.

== See also ==
- Rushinga (Senatorial constituency)
