= Mutumba =

Mutumba is both a given name and a surname. Notable people with the name include:

- Mutumba Mainga (born 1938), Zambian historian
- Bash Mutumba, Ugandan photographer
- Martin Kayongo-Mutumba (born 1985), Swedish footballer

== See also ==
- Commune of Mutumba, commune in Burundi
