= Rusike =

Rusike is a Zimbabwean surname. Notable people with the surname include:

- Evans Rusike (born 1990), Zimbabwean football forward
- Matthew Rusike (born 1990), Zimbabwean football player
- Tafadzwa Rusike (born 1989), Zimbabwean football winger
