= Mabika =

Mabika is an African surname that may refer to:

- Dunn Mabika Hove (1959–2007), Zimbabwean military intelligence officer
- Mwadi Mabika (born 1976), Congolese-American basketball player
- Taylor Mabika, Gabonese boxer
- Yolande Mabika (born 1987), Congolese-born Brazilian judoka
