= Tafirenyika =

Tafirenyika is a Zimbabwean surname. Notable people with the surname include:

- Pride Tafirenyika, a Zimbabwean footballer
- Tracy Tafirenyika, a Zimbabwean-born Namibian journalist
