= Chiweshe =

Chiweshe is an African surname. Notable people with the surname include:

- Ellen Chiweshe, Zimbabwean Air Force officer
- George Chiweshe (born 1953), Chairperson of the Zimbabwe Electoral Commission
- Stella Chiweshe (born 1946), Zimbabwean musician
