= Mount Darwin District =

- District
- Interactive map of Mount Darwin District
- Coordinates: 16°30′S 31°45′E
- Country: Zimbabwe
- Province: Mashonaland Central
- District: Mount Darwin

Area
  - Total: 4,596 km^{2} (1,775 sq mi)
- Elevation: 832 m (2,730 ft)

Population (2022 census)
  - Total: 240,728
  - Density: 52.38/km^{2} (135.7/sq mi)
- Time zone: UTC+1 (CET)
  - Summer (DST): UTC+1 (CEST)

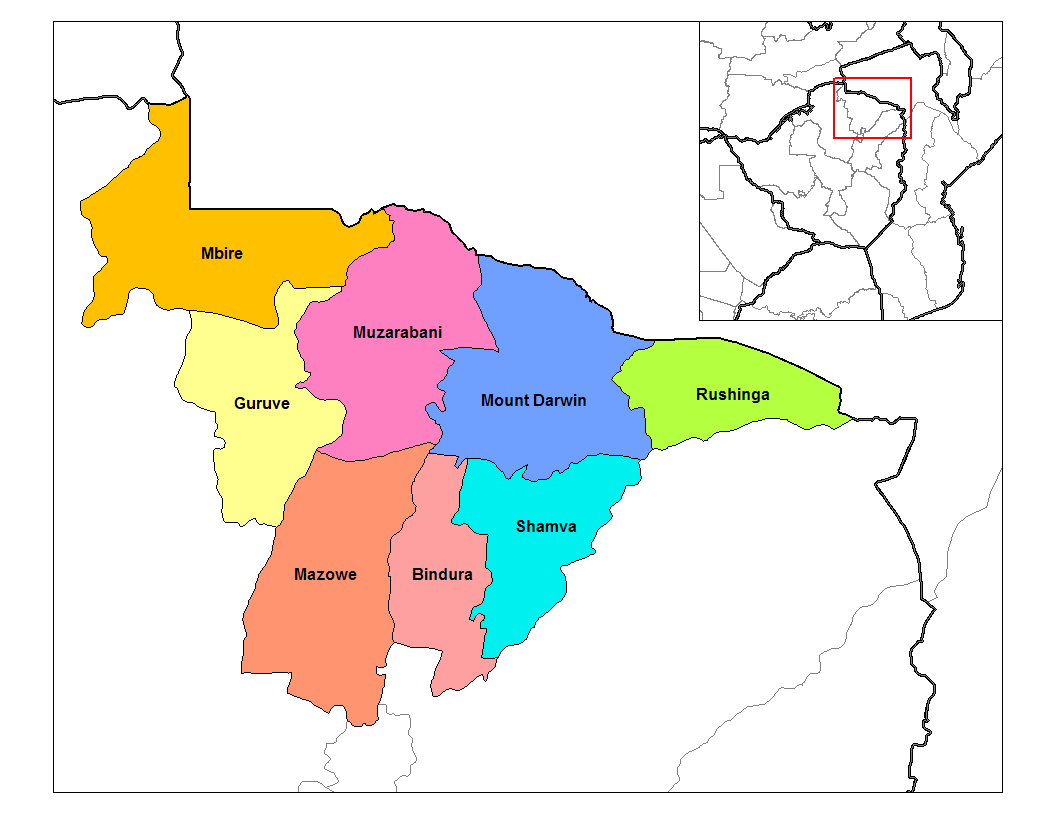
Mount Darwin among other Marshonaland districts

Mount Darwin (alternate: Darwin) is one of seven districts in the Mashonaland Central province of Zimbabwe. The district's capital is the town of Mount Darwin (Pfura). The district has a population of 240,728 inhabitants (2022 census).
