= Musani =

Musani is a Ugandan surname. Notable people with the surname include:

- Mary Musani (born 1944), Ugandan hurdler
- Richard Musani (born 1985), Ugandan businessman
- Rose Musani (born 1956), Ugandan sprinter
