= Beitbridge District =

City in Zimbabwe

Coordinates: 21°50′S 30°00′E

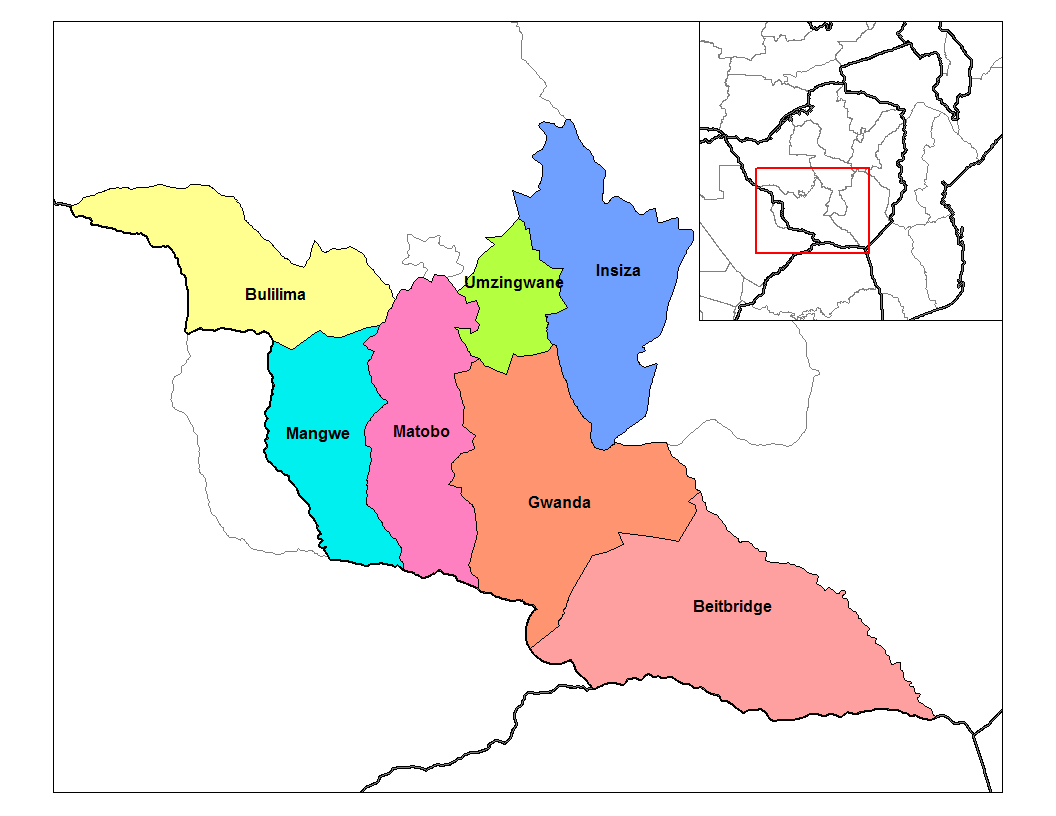
A map of the districts of Matabeleland South

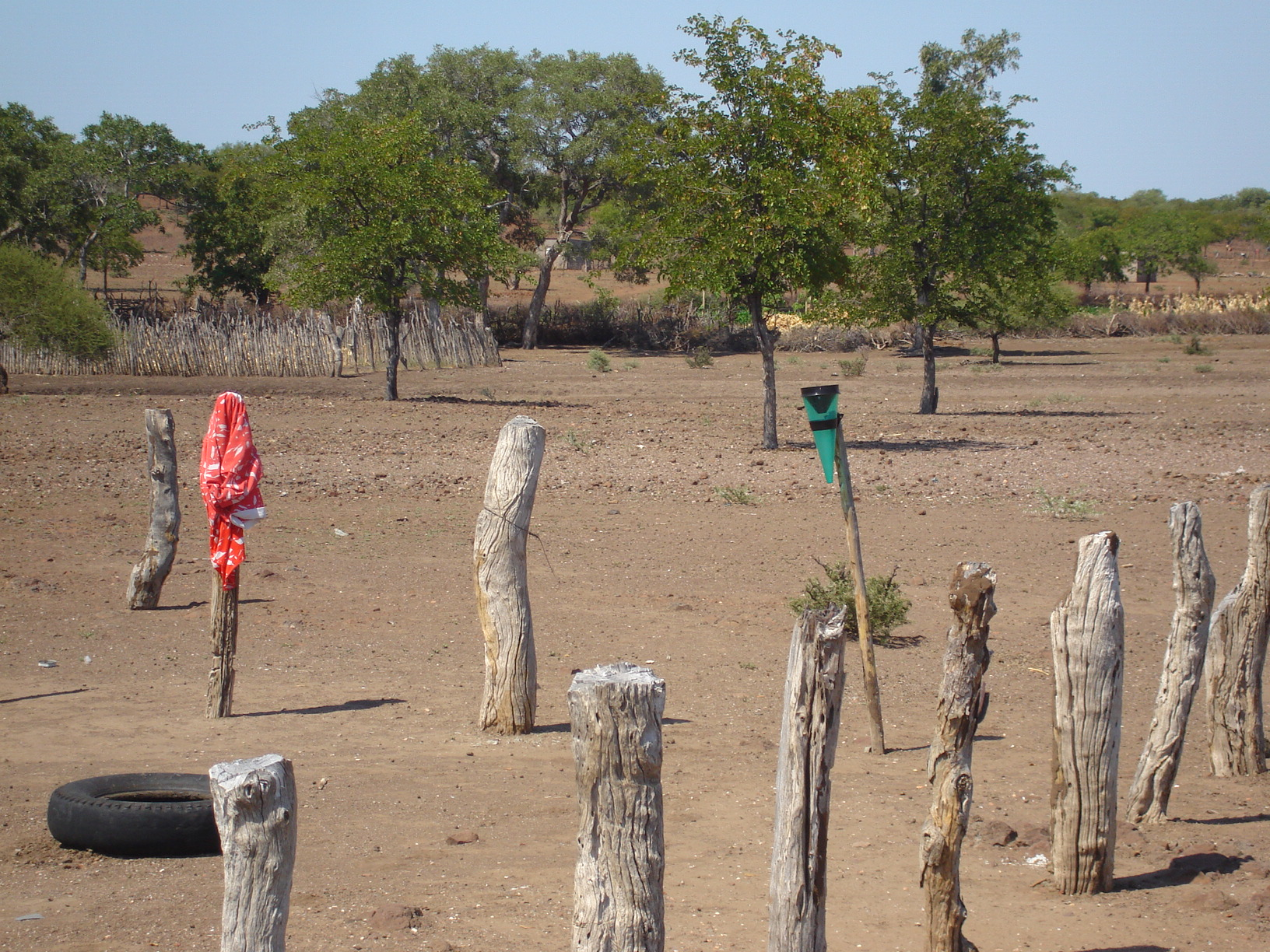
Masera area, Beitbridge.

Beitbridge is a district in Matabeleland South, Zimbabwe Situated 18 kilometers north of Musina and 548 kilometers north of Johannesburg. Beitbridge district is located in the Lowveld area. The town lies 6 km ESE of the confluence of the Bubye River and the Limpopo on the border with South Africa. It was established in 1929.

The district has a population of 94,001 people, as of 2022. An estimated 60 percent of Beitbridge's rural population is female, reflecting extensive male migration to South Africa.

The district is divided into 15 wards, namely Chipise, Dite, Chaswingo, Tongwe, Chapfuche, Mtetengwe, Masera, Shashi, Machuchuta, Dendele, Chamnangana, Majini, Lesanth, Mazunga, and Nuli/Shabwe.
