= Gwanda District =

Coordinates: 21°30′S 29°30′E

- Second-level administrative subdivision
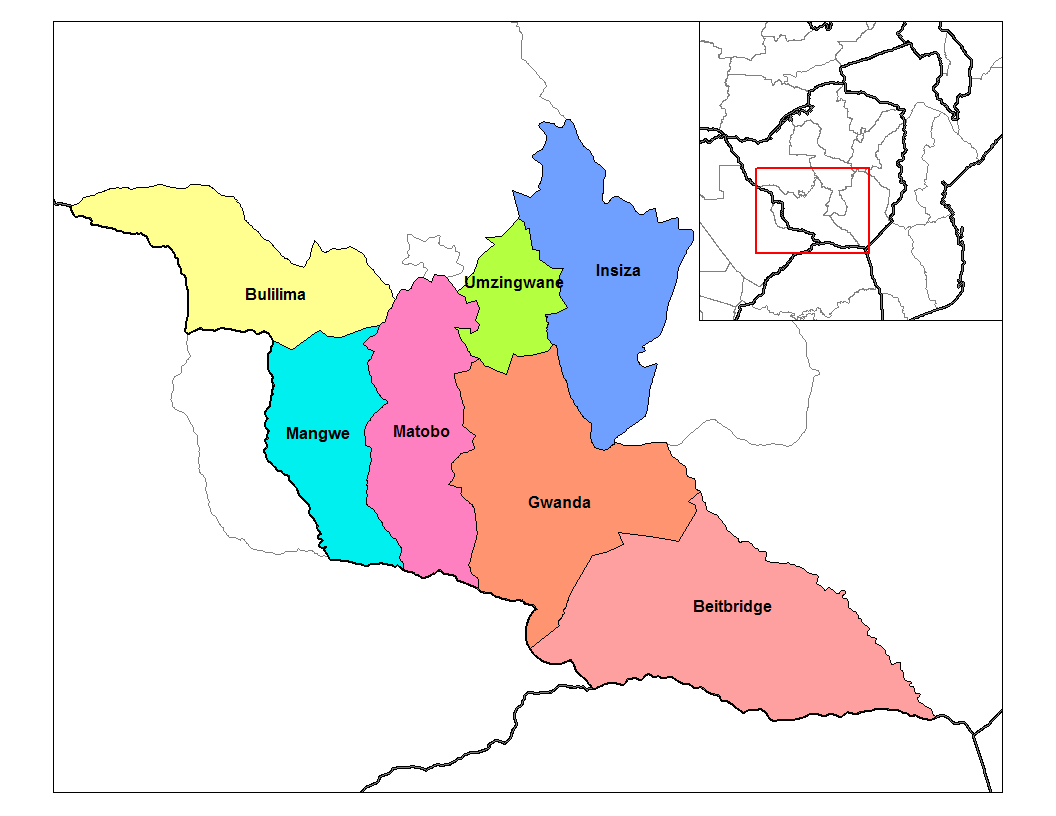
- Country: Zimbabwe
- Province: Matabeleland South

Area
  - Second-level administrative subdivision: 10,735 km^{2} (4,145 sq mi)

Population (2022 census)
  - Second-level administrative subdivision: 151,691
  - Density: 14.131/km^{2} (36.598/sq mi)
  - Urban: 27,143
- Time zone: UTC+1 (CET)
  - Summer (DST): UTC+1 (CEST)

Gwanda District is located in Matabeleland South province of Zimbabwe. Its administrative seat is Gwanda, the biggest city of the province.

The city of Gwanda has a municipal council, with 10 wards, while the remainder of the district falls under the Gwanda Rural District Council, which has 24 wards.
