= Matabeleland South Province =

Coordinates: 21°00′S 29°30′E

Matabeleland South: Dunhu reMatabeleland South (Shona); Isabelo seMatabeleland South (Northern Ndebele)
- Province
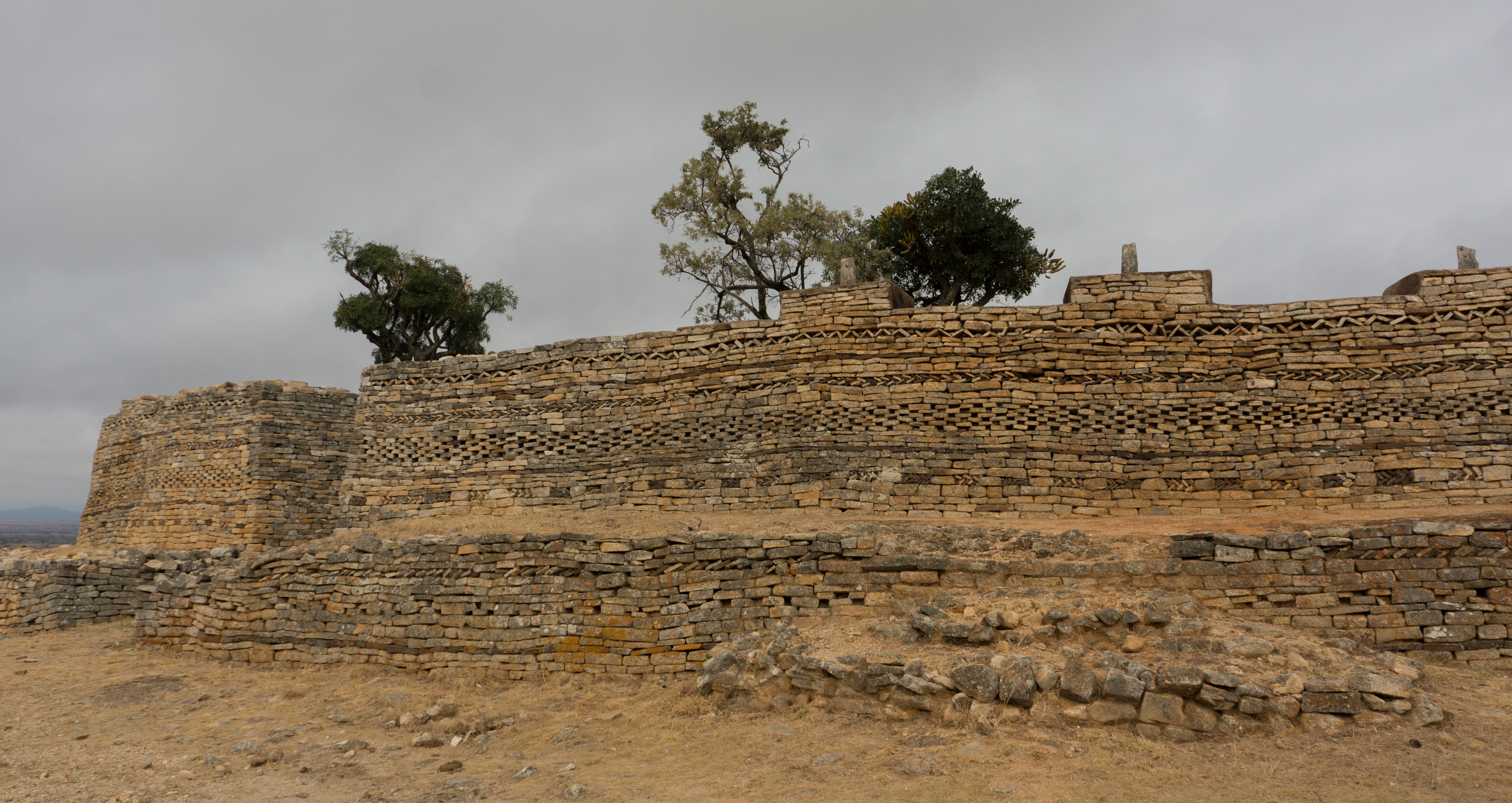
- Naletale wall ruins

- Location of Matabeleland South in Zimbabwe
- Country: Zimbabwe
- Established: 1974
- Capital: Gwanda

Government
  - Type: Provincial Government
  - Minister of State for Provincial Affairs: Albert Nguluvhe (ZANU-PF)

Area
  - Total: 54,172 km^{2} (20,916 sq mi)

Population (2022 census)
  - Total: 760,345
  - Density: 14.036/km^{2} (36.352/sq mi)
- HDI (2018): 0.537 low · 6th

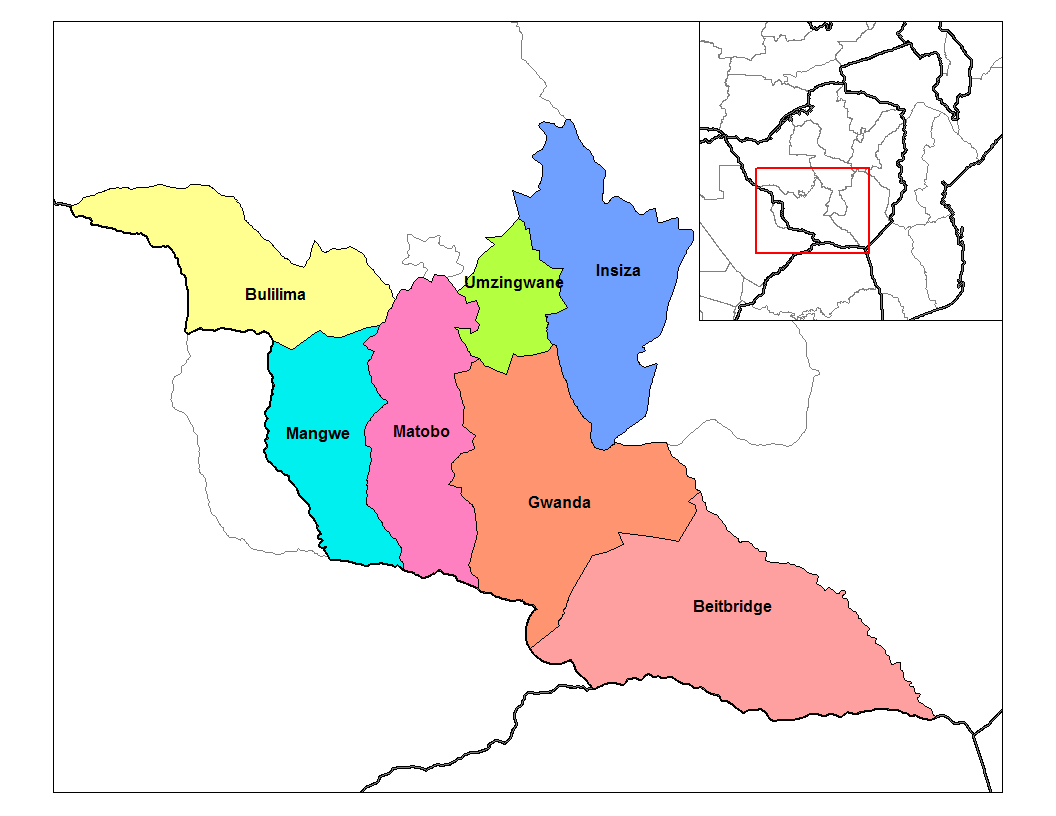
Districts of Matabeleland South

Matabeleland South is a province in southwestern Zimbabwe. With a population of 683,893 as of the 2012 Zimbabwean census. It is the country's least populated province after Matabeleland North. Matabeleland South and Matabeleland North were established in 1974, when the original Matabeleland Province was bifurcated. The province is divided into six districts. Gwanda is the capital, and Beitbridge is the province's largest town. The name "Matabeleland" is derived from Ndebele, the province's largest ethnic group.

Matabeleland South is bordered by Bulawayo and Matabeleland North to the north, Midlands to the northeast, Masvingo to the southeast, South Africa to the south, and Botswana to the west. It has an area of 54,172 square kilometres (20,916 mi^{2}), equal to 13.86% of the total area of Zimbabwe. It is the fourth-largest of the country's ten provinces in area. Matabeleland South sits on the edge of the Kalahari Desert, giving it an arid climate not hospitable to agriculture.

== Geography ==
The province sits on the edge of the Kalahari desert, hence it is arid and very dry. The province shares borders with South Africa and Botswana. As a result, there are Tswana, Sotho/Pedi, Venda, Shangani (Tsonga) and the Khoisan speaking people in the province. The other languages that are native in the province are Ndebele and Kalanga.

=== Towns and villages ===
Towns and villages in Matabeleland South include Antelope Mine, Beitbridge, Brunapeg, Colleen Bawn, Esigodini, Filabusi, Fort Rixon, Gwai, Gwanda, Kafusi, Kezi, Madlambudzi, Makhado, Maphisa, Masendu, Ndolwane, Plumtree, Shangani, Stanmore, Tshitshi, Bulu, West Nicholson, and Zezani.

== Demographics ==
Census	Population
2002	653,054
2012	683,893
2022	760,345

== Government and politics ==
=== Provincial government ===
Matabeleland South is overseen by the Minister of State for Matabeleland South Province, a de facto governor who oversees provincial affairs and sits in the House of Assembly of the Parliament of Zimbabwe. The governor is appointed by the President of Zimbabwe and is not appointed to a set term. Historically, the governor held the title Governor of Matabeleland South, but the office has since been renamed to align with the 2013 Constitution of Zimbabwe, which does not allow for provincial governors.

The current Minister of State for Matabeleland South Province is Abednico Ncube, a ZANU–PF member who was appointed by President Emmerson Mnangagwa in December 2017.

=== Districts ===
Matabeleland South Province is divided into seven districts: Beitbridge, Bulilima, Gwanda, Insiza, Mangwe, Matobo, and Umzingwane.

=== National politics ===
Presidential election results
Year	ZANU–PF	MDC / MDC–T
2018	49.40% 107,008	41.69% 90,292
2013	51.88% 81,180	37.47% 58,633
2008	37.92% 46,155	28.66% 34,885
2002	43.68% 73,369	50.20% 84,322
1996	-	-
1990	-	-

Like each of Zimbabwe's ten provinces, Matabeleland South Province is represented in the Senate by six senators, three of whom must be women. Senators are not directly elected by voters, but are instead selected by party lists via a proportional representation system. The province's current senators since the 2018 elections are Themba Mathuthu (ZANU–PF), Alma Mkwebu (ZANU–PF), Tambudzani Mohadi (ZANU–PF), Simon Khaya-Moyo (ZANU–PF), Bekithemba Mpofu (MDC Alliance), and Meliwe Phuthi (MDC Alliance).

Matabeleland South is represented by 13 Members of Parliament in the House of Assembly, Zimbabwe's lower house of Parliament. The province's current MPs since the 2018 elections are Patrick Dube, CCC Mp, Levi Mayihlome, CCC MP, Edgar Moyo, Abednico Ncube, Soul Ncube, Nqobizitha Ndlovu, Albert Nguluvhe, Dingumuzi CCC MP, Spare Sithole, and Farai Taruvinga. All are members of ZANU–PF except for Dube, who represents the MDC Alliance. Fast forward in 2023 now CCC and still under Nelson Chamisa the opposition made serious in roads and managed to wrestle 4 seats that is Mangwe- Matobo, Gwanda North, Mangwe and Beitbridge west. What surprised the whole province is that opposition won Beitbridge West for the first time dating back from 2000. Also for the first time opposition shared with ZANU PF the senate seats and women quota, but still ZANUPF managed to win the youth quota rep .

== Economy ==
Its economy is largely centered around subsistence farming and livestock farming. Droughts and a lack of economic opportunities have resulted in widespread poverty and migration out of the province.

Transport

The province has an important geographical location which can link Botswana to Malawi or South Africa to south Zambia through Bulawayo, but due to lack of investment, the old transport hub of the late 20th century lost its familiarity and use with these two countries.

== See also ==
- Matabele people
- Bulawayo
- Provinces of Zimbabwe
- Districts of Zimbabwe
