= Districts of Zimbabwe =

The Republic of Zimbabwe is broken down into 10 administrative provinces, which are divided into 64 districts and 1,970 wards.

Districts of Zimbabwe

== Bulawayo Province ==
Bulawayo district

- Bulawayo

== Harare Province ==
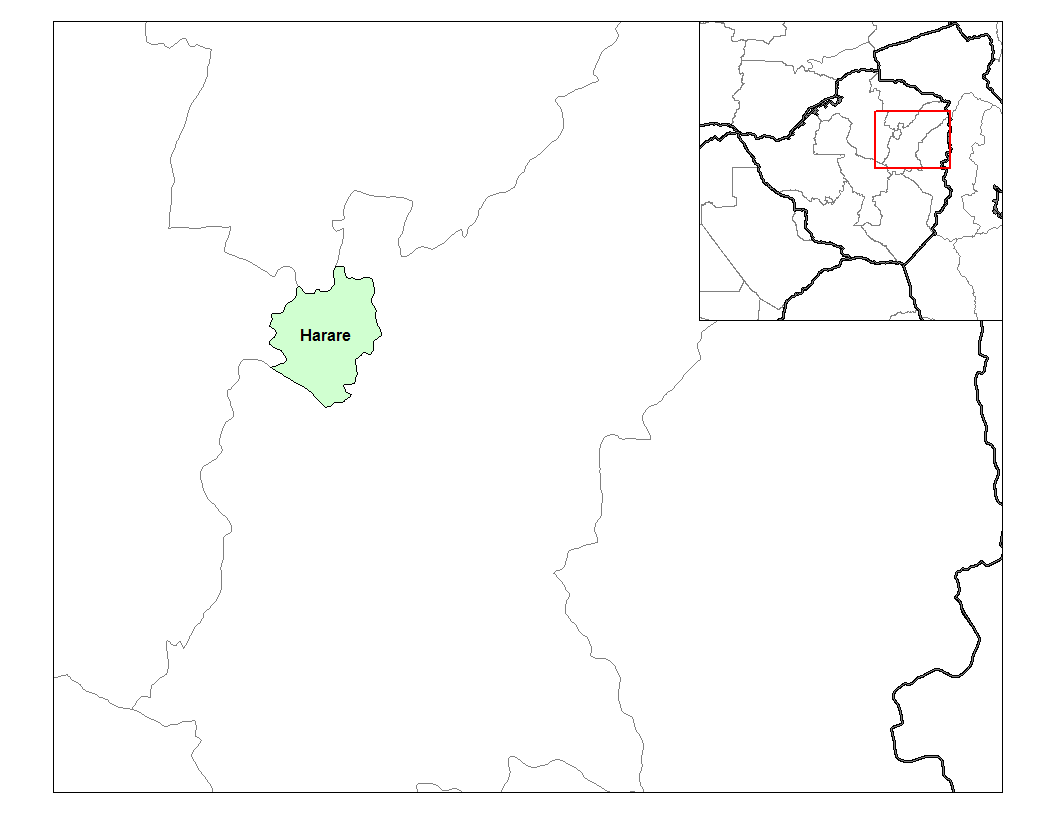
Harare district

- Harare
- Chitungwiza
- Epworth
- Glen View
- Budiriro
- Borrowdale
- Waterfalls
- Kuwadzana
- Dzivarasekwa
- Mount Pleasant
- Chispite
- Hatfield
- Hatcliffe
- Warren Park
- Melborough
- Ishehwokunze
- Mabvuku
- Zimre

== Manicaland Province ==
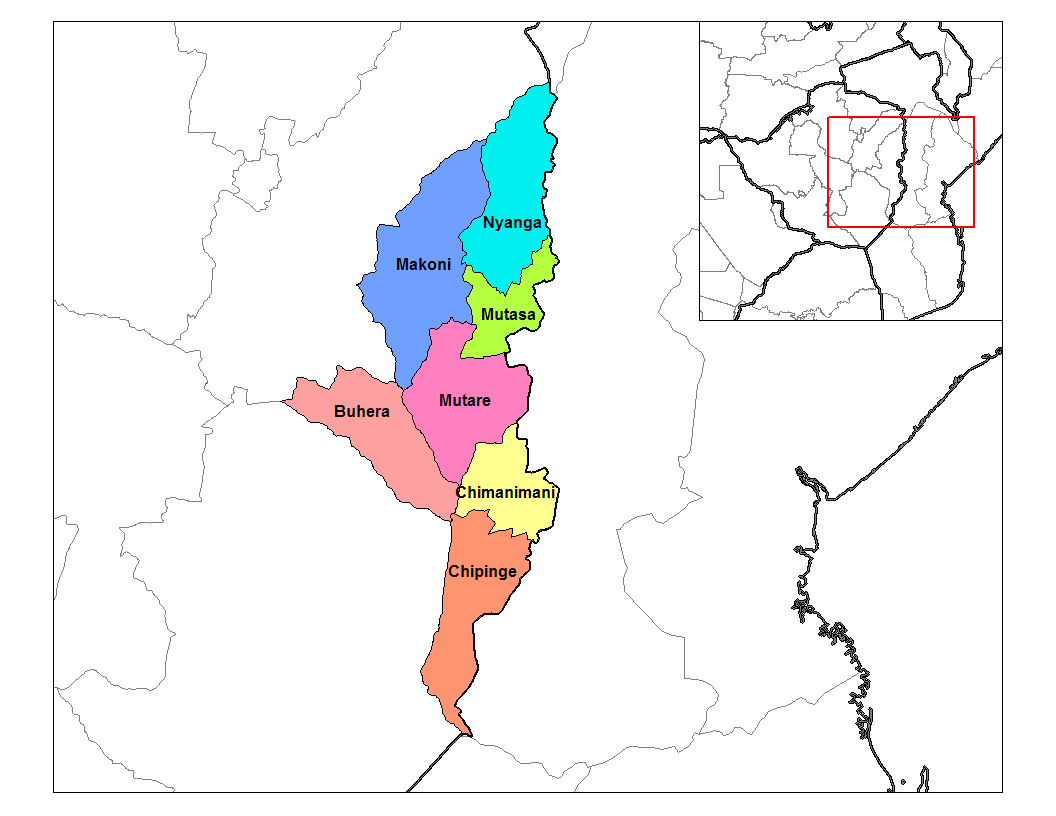
Districts of Manicaland

- Buhera
- Chimanimani
- Chipinge
- Makoni
- Mutare
- Mutasa
- Nyanga

== Mashonaland Central Province ==
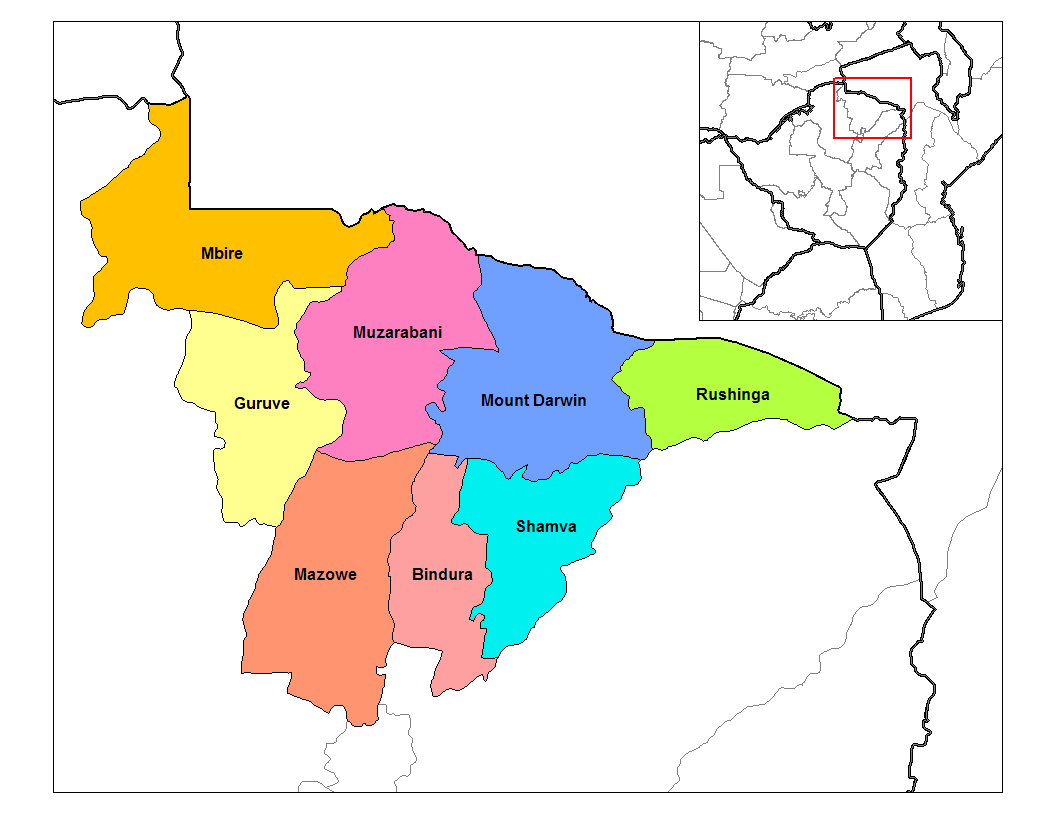
Districts of Mashonaland Central

- Bindura
- Guruve
- Mazowe
- Mbire
- Mount Darwin
- Muzarabani
- Rushinga
- Shamva

== Mashonaland East Province ==
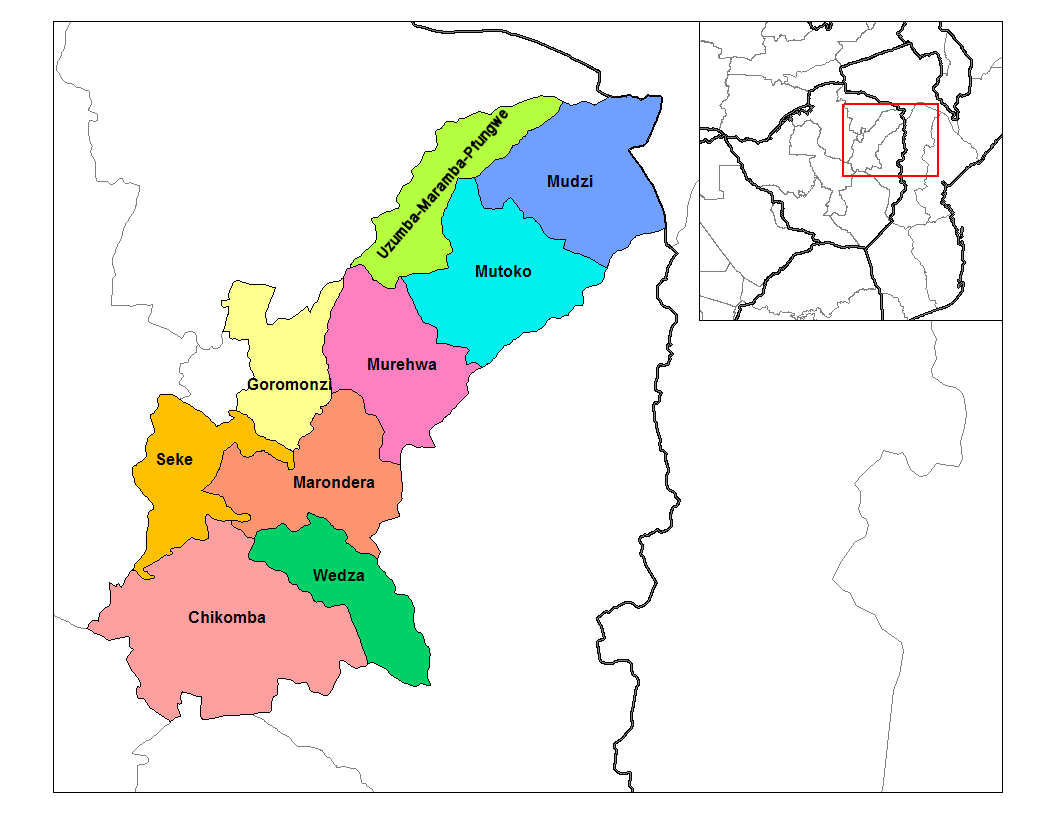
Districts of Mashonaland East

- Chikomba
- Goromonzi
- Marondera
- Mudzi
- Murehwa
- Mutoko
- Seke
- UMP (Uzumba-Maramba-Pfungwe)
- Wedza (Hwedza)

== Mashonaland West Province ==
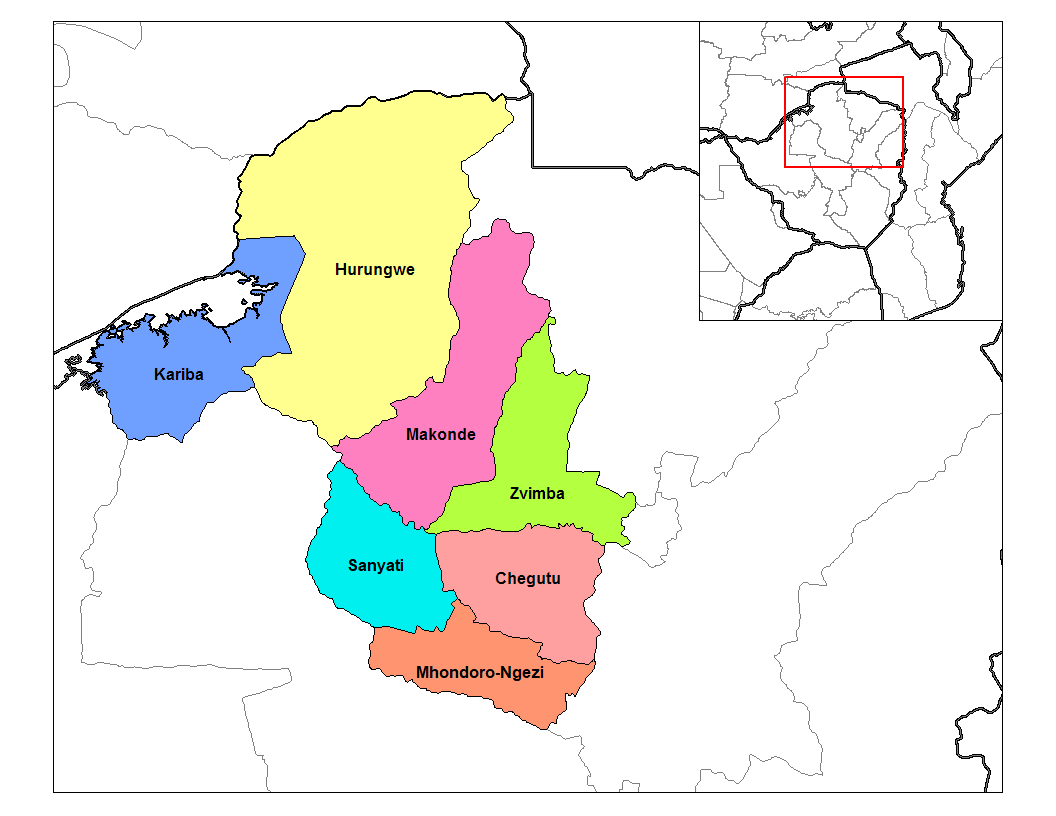
Districts of Mashonaland West

- Chegutu
- Hurungwe
- Kariba
- Makonde
- Mhondoro-Ngezi
- Sanyati
- Zvimba

== Masvingo Province ==
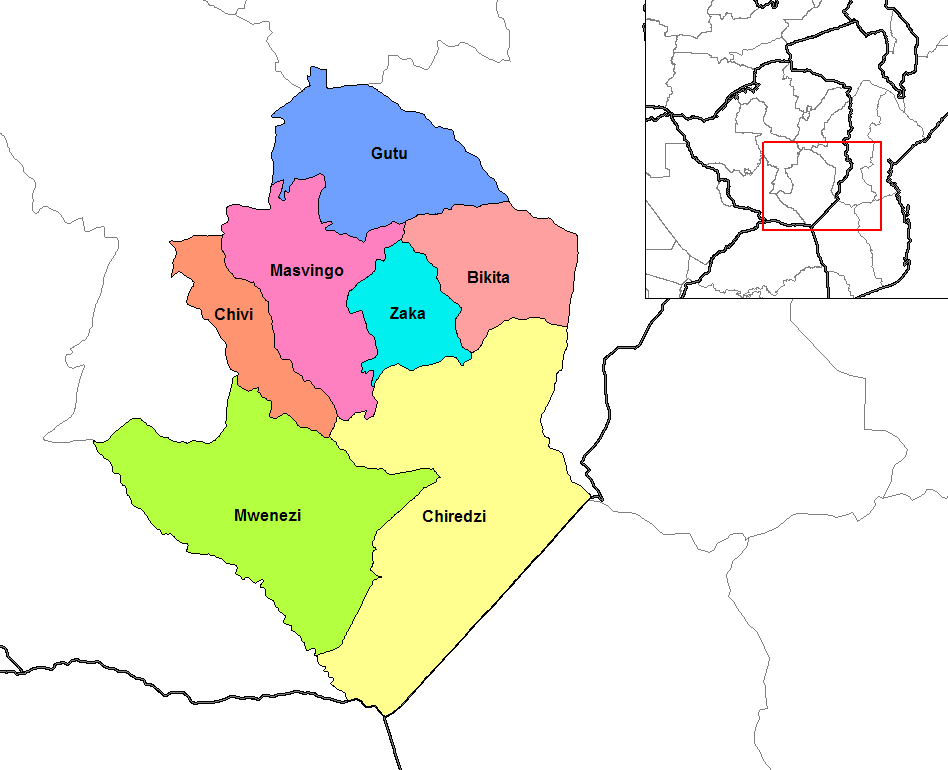
Districts of Masvingo

- Bikita
- Chiredzi
- Chivi
- Gutu
- Masvingo
- Mwenezi
- Zaka

== Matabeleland North Province ==
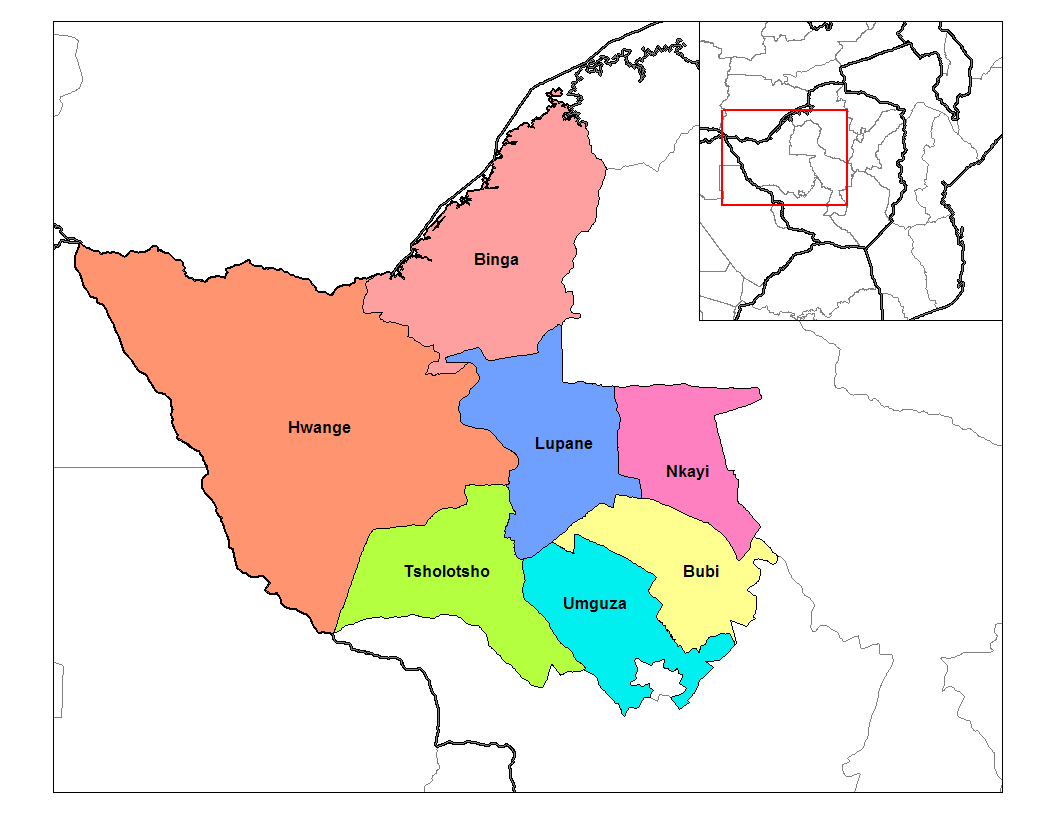
Districts of Matabeleland North

- Binga
- Bubi
- Hwange
- Lupane
- Nkayi
- Tsholotsho
- Umguza

== Matabeleland South Province ==
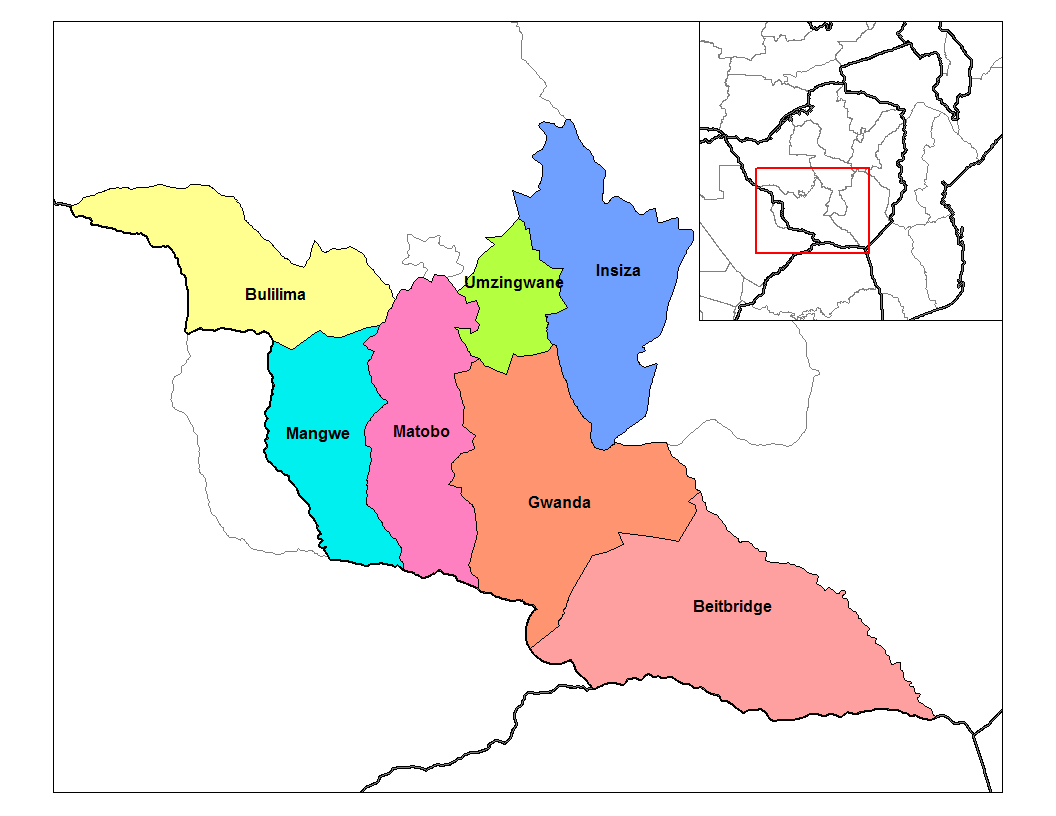
Districts of Matabeleland South

- Beitbridge
- Bulilima
- Gwanda
- Insiza
- Mangwe
- Matobo
- Umzingwane

== Midlands Province ==
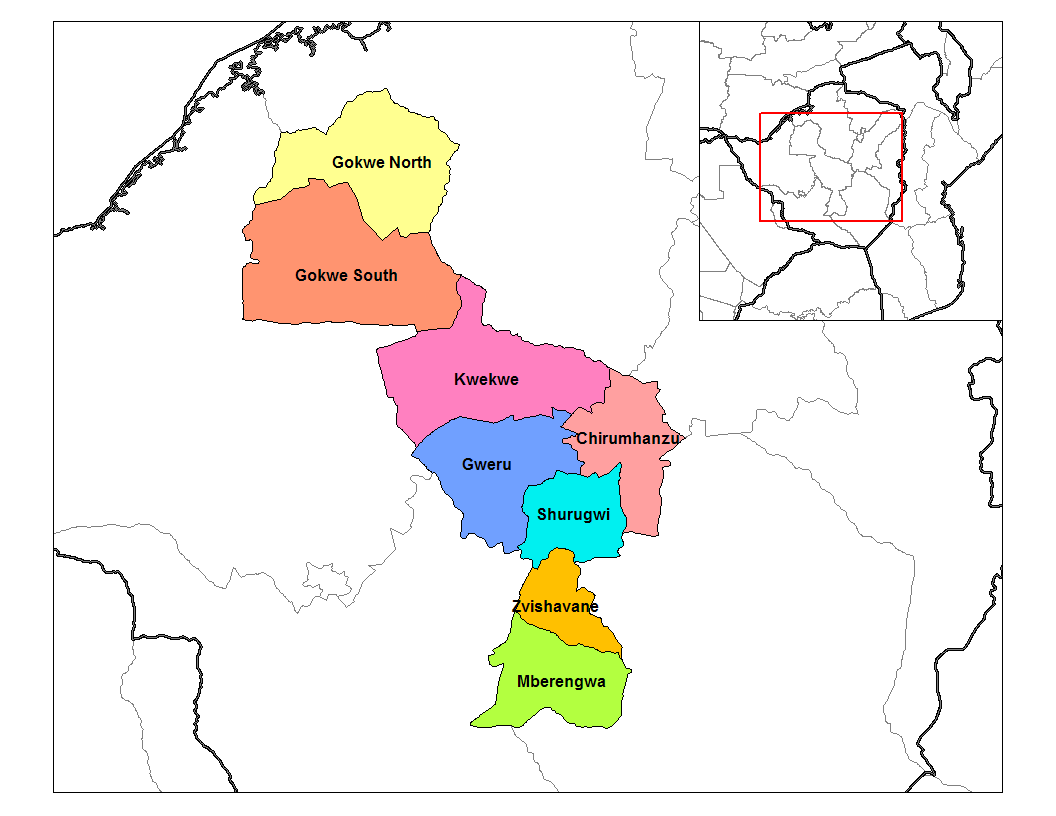
Districts of Midlands

- Chirumhanzu
- Gokwe North
- Gokwe South
- Vungu
- Kwekwe
- Mberengwa
- Shurugwi
- Zvishavane

Population by District (Zimbabwe)
District	Own	Province	Capital	Area (km²)	Population	Density (Persons/km²)
Chirumhanzu	MI-01	Midlands	Chirumhanzu	4,749	95,272	20.1
Chitungwiza	HA-01	Harare	Harare	49	371,246	7576.4
Chivi	MV-04	Masvingo	Chivi	3,543	172,979	48.8
Epworth	HA-02	Harare	Harare	35	206,368	5896.2
Gokwe North	MI-02	Midlands	Gokwe	7,268	249,723	34.4
Gokwe South	MI-03	Midlands	Gokwe	11,124	317,554	28.5
Gokwe Urban	MI-04	Midlands	Gokwe	19	33,073	1740.7
Goromonzi	ME-02	Mashonaland East	Goromonzi	2,520	386,203	153.3
Guruve	MC-03	Mashonaland Central	Guruve	2,994	153,606	51.3
Gutu	MV-05	Masvingo	Gutu	7,054	208,149	29.5
Gwanda Rural	MS-04	Matabeleland South	Gwanda	10,712	124,548	11.6
Gwanda Urban	MS-05	Matabeleland South	Gwanda	23	27,143	1180.1
Gweru Rural	MI-05	Midlands	Gweru	5,889	121,712	20.7
Gweru Urban	MI-06	Midlands	Gweru	164	161,294	983.5
Harare Rural	HA-03	Harare	Harare	195	357,863	1835.2
Harare Urban	HA-04	Harare	Harare	660	1,491,754	2260.2
Hurungwe (Karoi Rural)	MW-04	Mashonaland West	Karoi	19,843	390,897	19.7
Hwange Rural	MN-03	Matabeleland North	Hwange	26,974	69,357	2.6
Hwange Urban	MN-04	Matabeleland North	Hwange	310	40,241	129.8
Hwedza	ME-03	Mashonaland East	Hwedza	2,560	74,870	29.2
Insiza	MS-06	Matabeleland South	Insiza	8,221	122,903	14.9
Kadoma Urban	MW-05	Mashonaland West	Kadoma	254	117,381	462.1
Kariba Rural	MW-06	Mashonaland West	Kariba	8,191	45,774	5.6
Kariba Urban	MW-07	Mashonaland West	Kariba	24	27,910	1162.9
Karoi	MW-08	Mashonaland West	Karoi	17	37,564	2209.6
Kwekwe Rural	MI-07	Midlands	Kwekwe	8,748	197,062	22.5
Kwekwe Urban	MI-08	Midlands	Kwekwe	86	119,863	1393.8
Lupane	MN-05	Matabeleland North	Lupane	10,107	107,248	10.6
Makonde	MW-09	Mashonaland West	Makonde	8,564	209,960	24.5
Makoni	MA-05	Manicaland	Makoni	7,834	288,441	36.8
Mangwe Rural	MS-07	Matabeleland South	Mangwe	5,722	65,562	11.5
Mangwe Urban	MS-08	Matabeleland South	Mangwe	174	14,460	83.1
Marondera Rural	ME-04	Mashonaland East	Marondera	3,414	136,173	39.9
Marondera Urban	ME-05	Mashonaland East	Marondera	59	66,204	1122.1
Masvingo Rural	MV-06	Masvingo	Masvingo	6,849	238,103	34.8
Masvingo Urban	MV-07	Masvingo	Masvingo	72	90,286	1254.0
Matobo	MS-09	Matabeleland South	Matobo	7,245	95,694	13.2
Mazowe	MC-04	Mashonaland Central	Mazowe	4,354	293,363	67.4
Mberengwa	MI-09	Midlands	Mberengwa	5,066	208,458	41.1
Mbire	MC-05	Mashonaland Central	Mbire	4,696	83,720	17.8
Mhondoro-Ngezi	MW-10	Mashonaland West	Mhondoro	4,295	140,994	32.8
Mount Darwin	MC-06	Mashonaland Central	Pfura	4,596	240,728	52.4
Mudzi	ME-06	Mashonaland East	Mudzi	4,158	158,478	38.1
Murehwa	ME-07	Mashonaland East	Murehwa	3,556	205,440	57.8
Mutare Rural	MA-06	Manicaland	Mutare	5,523	306,760	55.5
Mutare Urban	MA-07	Manicaland	Mutare	191	224,804	1177.0
Mutasa	MA-08	Manicaland	Mutasa	2,548	197,808	77.6
Mutoko	ME-08	Mashonaland East	Mutoko	4,050	161,091	39.8
Muzarabani	MC-07	Mashonaland Central	Muzarabani	4,266	134,076	31.4
Mvurwi	MC-08	Mashonaland Central	Mvurwi	3	15,646	5215.3
Mwenezi	MV-08	Masvingo	Mwenezi	13,210	209,327	15.8
Nkayi	MN-06	Matabeleland North	Nkayi	4,831	112,471	23.3
Norton	MW-11	Mashonaland West	Norton	62	87,039	1403.9
Nyanga	MA-09	Manicaland	Nyanga	5,781	146,227	25.3
Redcliff	MI-10	Midlands	Redcliff	113	41,526	367.5
Rusape	MA-10	Manicaland	Rusape	20	37,906	1895.3
Rushinga	MC-09	Mashonaland Central	Rushinga	2,328	76,876	33.0
Ruwa	ME-09	Mashonaland East	Ruwa	40	94,078	2352.0
Sanyati	MW-12	Mashonaland West	Sanyati	4,833	139,235	28.8
Seke	ME-10	Mashonaland East	Seke	2,637	200,478	76.0
Shamva	MC-10	Mashonaland Central	Shamva	2,695	165,641	61.5
Shurugwi Rural	MI-11	Midlands	Shurugwi	3,464	98,315	28.4
Shurugwi Urban	MI-12	Midlands	Shurugwi	134	23,304	173.9
Tsholotsho	MN-07	Matabeleland North	Tsholotsho	7,745	115,782	14.9
Umguza	MN-08	Matabeleland North	Umguza	6,043	113,265	18.7
Umzingwane	MS-10	Matabeleland South	Umzingwane	2,780	71,860	25.8
Uzumba-Maramba-Pfungwe	ME-11	Mashonaland East	Murehwa	2,673	124,226	46.5
Victoria Falls	MN-09	Matabeleland North	Victoria Falls	28	35,215	1257.7
Zaka	MV-09	Masvingo	Zaka	3,126	198,889	63.6
Zvimba	MW-13	Mashonaland West	Zvimba	6,072	348,002	57.3
Zvishavane Rural	MI-13	Midlands	Zvishavane	2,476	85,035	34.3
Zvishavane Urban	MI-14	Midlands	Zvishavane	62	59,714	963.1

== See also ==
- Provinces of Zimbabwe
- Wards of Zimbabwe
