= Provinces of Zimbabwe =

- Category: Unitary state
- Location: Republic of Zimbabwe
- Number: 10 Provinces
- Populations: 665,952 (Bulawayo) – 2,427,231 (Harare Province)
- Areas: 1,710 km^{2} (659 sq mi) (Bulawayo) - 28,967 sq mi (75,025 km^{2}) (Matabeleland North)
- Government: Provincial government, National government
- Subdivisions: District

Provinces are constituent political entities of Zimbabwe. Zimbabwe currently has ten provinces, two of which are cities with provincial status. Zimbabwe is a unitary state, and its provinces exercise only the powers that the central government chooses to delegate. Provinces are divided into districts, which are divided into wards.

The Constitution of Zimbabwe delineates provincial governance and powers. After constitutional amendments in 1988, provinces were administered by a governor directly appointed by the President of Zimbabwe. Since the 2013 constitutional changes, there are technically no longer provincial governors, though in practice they remain in place as Ministers of State for Provincial Affairs. The 2013 Constitution also calls for the devolution of governmental powers and responsibilities where appropriate, though Zimbabwean opposition parties argue that the central government has yet to comply.

With the establishment of Company rule in Rhodesia in the 1890s, the country was divided into two provinces: Matabeleland in the west and Mashonaland in the east. Under British colonial rule as Southern Rhodesia, the colony was divided into five provinces. Later, the Rhodesian government expanded the number of provinces to seven: Manicaland, Matabeleland North and South, Mashonaland North and South, Midlands, and Victoria (today Masvingo). In the 1980s, Mashonaland North and South were reorganized to become three provinces (Mashonaland Central, East and West). The youngest provinces, Bulawayo and Harare, were created in 1997.

Provinces of Zimbabwe
Name	Towns and cities		Established	Population (2022)	Total area		Population density (per km²)	Location
Name	Capital	Largest	Established	Population (2022)	km²	mi²	Population density (per km²)	Location
Bulawayo	Bulawayo		1997	665,952	900	347	739.95	
Harare	Harare		1997	2,427,231	872	337	2783.53	
Manicaland	Mutare		1897	2,037,703	36,459	14,078	55.90	
Mashonaland Central	Bindura		1983	1,384,891	28,347	10,948	48.88	
Mashonaland East	Marondera		?	1,731,173	32,230	12,440	53.73	
Mashonaland West	Chinhoyi	Kadoma	1983	1,893,584	57,441	22,178	32.96	
Masvingo	Masvingo		?	1,638,528	56,566	21,850	28.97	
Matabeleland North	Lupane	Victoria Falls	1973	827,645	75,025	28,970	11.03	
Matabeleland South	Gwanda	Beitbridge	1973	760,345	54,172	20,917	14.03	
Midlands	Gweru		?	1,811,905	49,166	18,984	36.84	

== See also ==
- Districts of Zimbabwe
- Municipalities of Zimbabwe
- List of provincial governors of Zimbabwe
- List of Zimbabwean provinces by population
- List of Zimbabwean provinces by Human Development Index
- List of Zimbabwean presidential election results by province
- ISO 3166-2:ZW
- Guruuswa
