= Matibi =

Coordinates: 22°05′S 30°39′E

Matibi is a former native reserve, now known as a communal land, in Southern Zimbabwe. It is found in the northern section of Mwenezi (District), north east of Manyuchi Dam and the mighty Mwenezi River; bordered by Belingwe communals lands to the north and Maranda communal lands to the south. It is home to Neshuro, Sarahura business centers and the famous school Chegato.

It is divided into Matibi 1 and 2. The population in these communal reserves were originally moved from their ancestral lands south of the river to create large cattle and game ranches of which Nuanetsi Ranch is the largest. During the land invasions of 2000 in Zimbabwe, people from the communal lands of Matibi and nearby Maranda invaded most of the ranches, supposedly reclaiming their former ancestral land.
