= Triangle, Zimbabwe =

Triangle Tirango
- Town
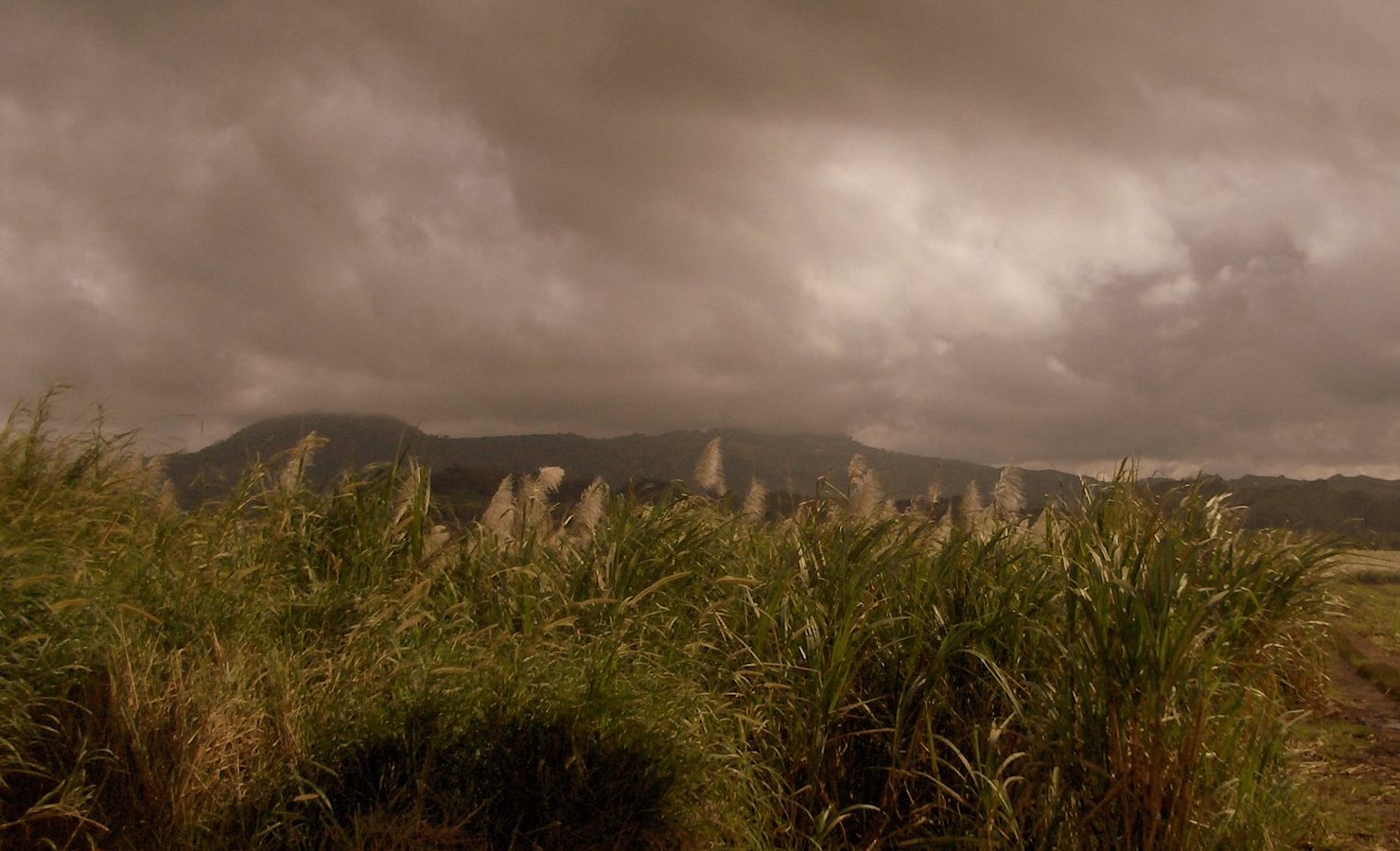
- A field of sugarcane owned by Triangle Ltd., the main land owner in the small town.
- Nickname: Kwameke
- Location in Zimbabwe
- Coordinates: 21°01′40″S 31°27′05″E
- Country: Zimbabwe
- Province: Masvingo
- District: Chiredzi
- Established: late 19th Century
- estimated
- Time zone: UTC+2 (CAT)
- Climate: Cwa
- Website: www.trianglesugar.com

Triangle is a small town in Masvingo Province, Zimbabwe, and is located 125 km south-east from Masvingo, between Ngundu Growth Point and Chiredzi. The town is located in the district of Chiredzi, one of the seven in Masvingo Province.

The town of Triangle is so named because when Murray MacDougall first tried to grow sugar cane, only three pieces of sugar cane grew, He said he could only do one thing with them and that was to make a triangle. It was the first attempt to grow sugar cane in Rhodesia now Zimbabwe.

== Background ==
The town developed around Tongaat Hulett's Triangle Estate, Zimbabwe's 2nd largest irrigation scheme, rivaling Hippo Valley Estate.

== Triangle Estate ==
In the company's fields, 13,500ha of sugar cane and are under irrigation and there is a large sugar mill on the estate. Sugar cane was first planted in the region in 1931 by Thomas Murray McDougall and was first processed in 1939. Due to the economic decline the country is going through, like at Hippo Valley, production of sugar has fallen in recent years. The decline in production has been compounded by a large body of displaced farmers who have settled on some of its productive fields, further hampering production.

At formation of the Sugar Estates, much of the labour to work the land was brought in from neighbouring Malawi and Zambia. These labourers came in to work on the sugar cane plantations as general labourers and cane cutters. As a result of intermarriages between the local Karanga, Shangaan and the plantation workers who were predominantly foreigners, this has resulted in the mix of ethnicities and cultures in Triangle and the Southern districts of Zimbabwe. The majority of the town's residents are employed by the company.

== Sports ==
First-class cricket has been played in Triangle at the well-established cricket venue located in the town. There is also a football club called Triangle United.
