= Mwenezi River =

Coordinates: 22°38′36″S 31°48′52″E

Mwenezi River Nuanetsi River
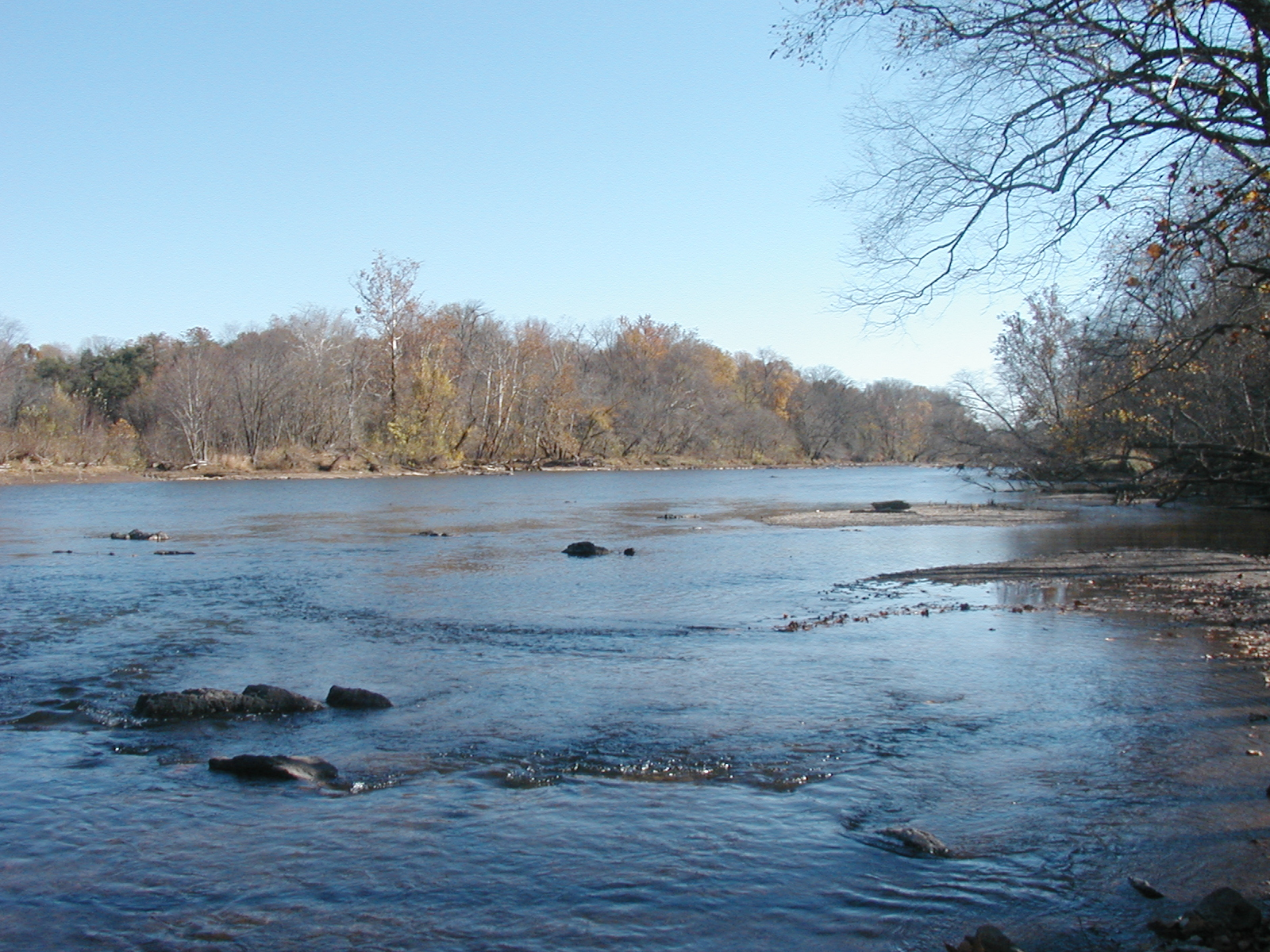
- Mwenezi River in Zimbabwe lowveld

- Location of the Mwenezi River's mouth

Location
- Country: Zimbabwe, Mozambique

Physical characteristics
- Source
  - location: Insiza District, South Central Zimbabwe
  - elevation: 1,195 m (3,921 ft)
- Mouth
  - location: Limpopo River
  - elevation: 149 m (489 ft)
- Basin size: 14,759 km^{2} (5,698 sq mi)
- Discharge
  - average: 14.34 mm/a (0.565 in/year) (unit flow)

The Mwenezi River, originally known as the Nuanetsi River, is a major tributary of the Limpopo River. The Mwenezi River starts up in south central Zimbabwe and flows south-east along what is known as the Mwenezi River Valley that bisects the district into two sectors. The river is found in both Zimbabwe and Mozambique. In Zimbabwe it has been known as the Nuanetsi or Nuanetzi River in the past, a name it retains in Mozambique.

The river flows through Gonarezhou National Park on its way to joining the mighty Limpopo River. The Mwenezi river is a major tributary and flows north–south. They do not meet in Zimbabwe, but converge to a distance of 20 kilometres (12 mi) downstream into Chicualacuala District, Mozambique. In between is the Sengwe Communal Land in Chiredzi District of Masvingo Province, mostly a flat and undulating area around 300 metres (980 ft) in elevation.

== Hydrology ==
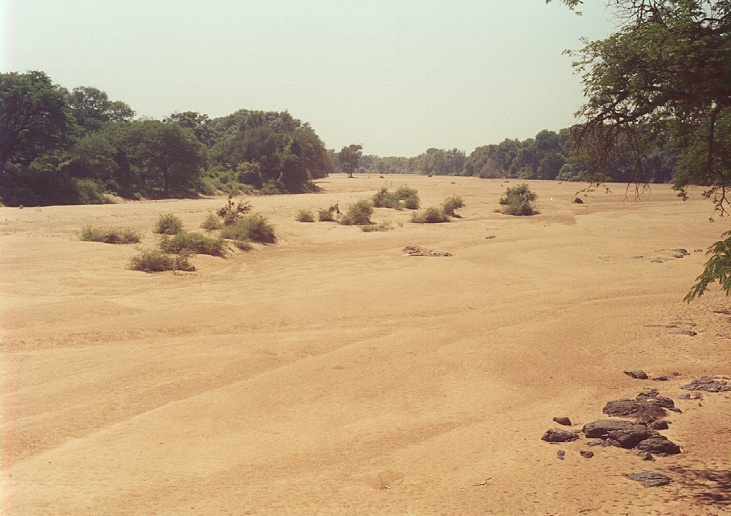
View upstream from the bridge on main Masvingo - Beitbridge road, near Rutenga.

The Mwenezi River is a river with an intermittent flow generally restricted to the months when rain takes place (November to April), with most flow recorded between December and February, except where it has been modified by dam operations. The river contributes 6.7% of the mean annual runoff of the Limpopo Basin, making it the third largest tributary to the Limpopo basin.

Its major tributaries are the Dinhe, Manyoshi, Mtedzi, Mhondi, Makugwe, Sosonye, Sovoleli, Malole, Mwele and Mushawe rivers.

== Settlements ==
The towns and settlements below are ordered from the source of the river to its mouth:

- Chegato mission
- Mwenezi village
- Mabalauta Camp, Gonarezhou National Park
- Malipati village

== Bridges and crossings ==
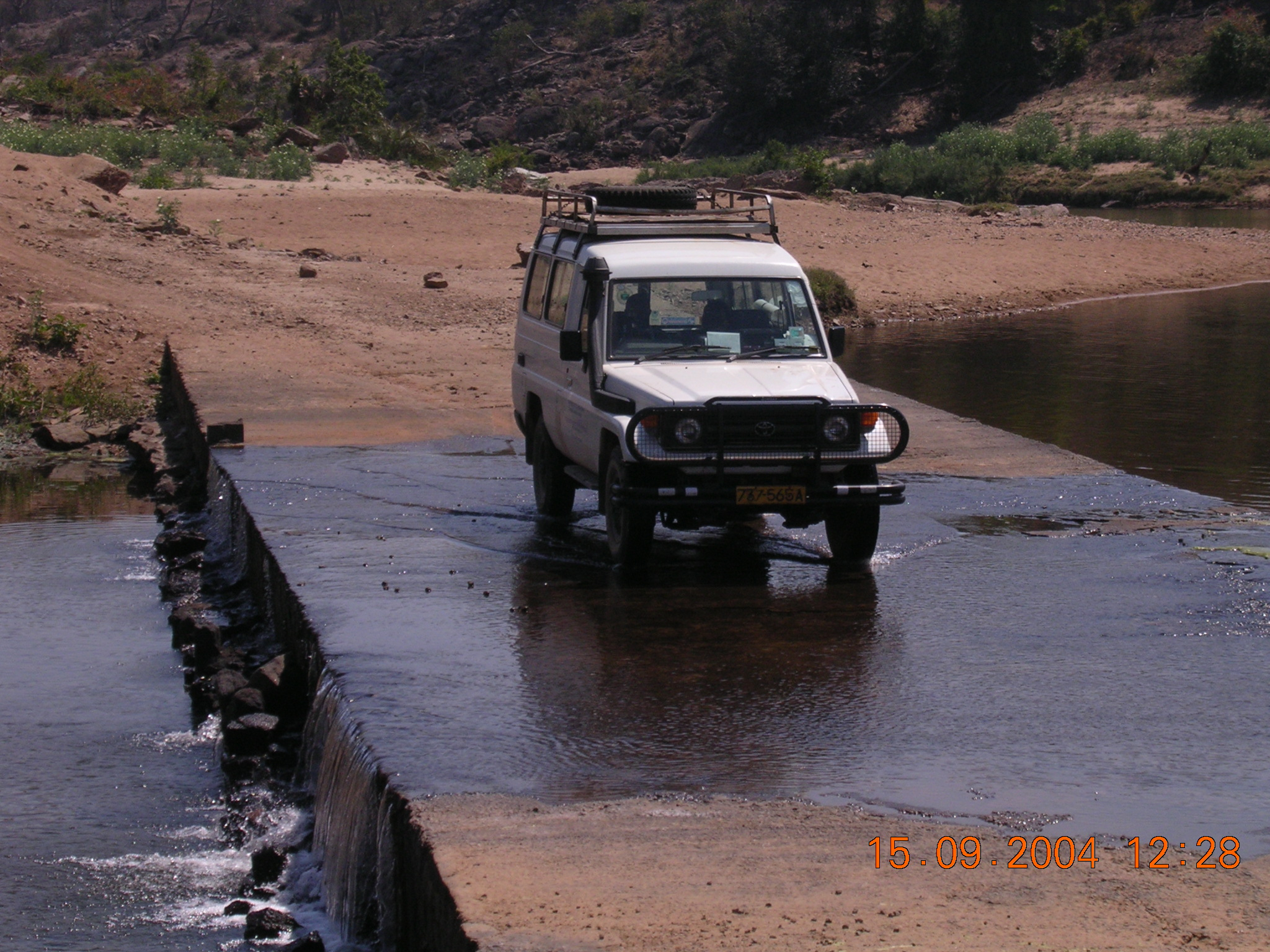
Ford (crossing) on the Mwenezi River at Mazetese, upstream of Manyuchi Dam.

There are four main bridges spanning the Mwenezi River:

- Bridge on main Masvingo - Beitbridge road, near Rutenga, also a rail bridge.
- Bridge on Chegato - Mataga road
- Bridge on Dinhe - Neshuro road
- Bridge near Malipati on road from Chikombedzi

There are also a number of fords.

== Development ==
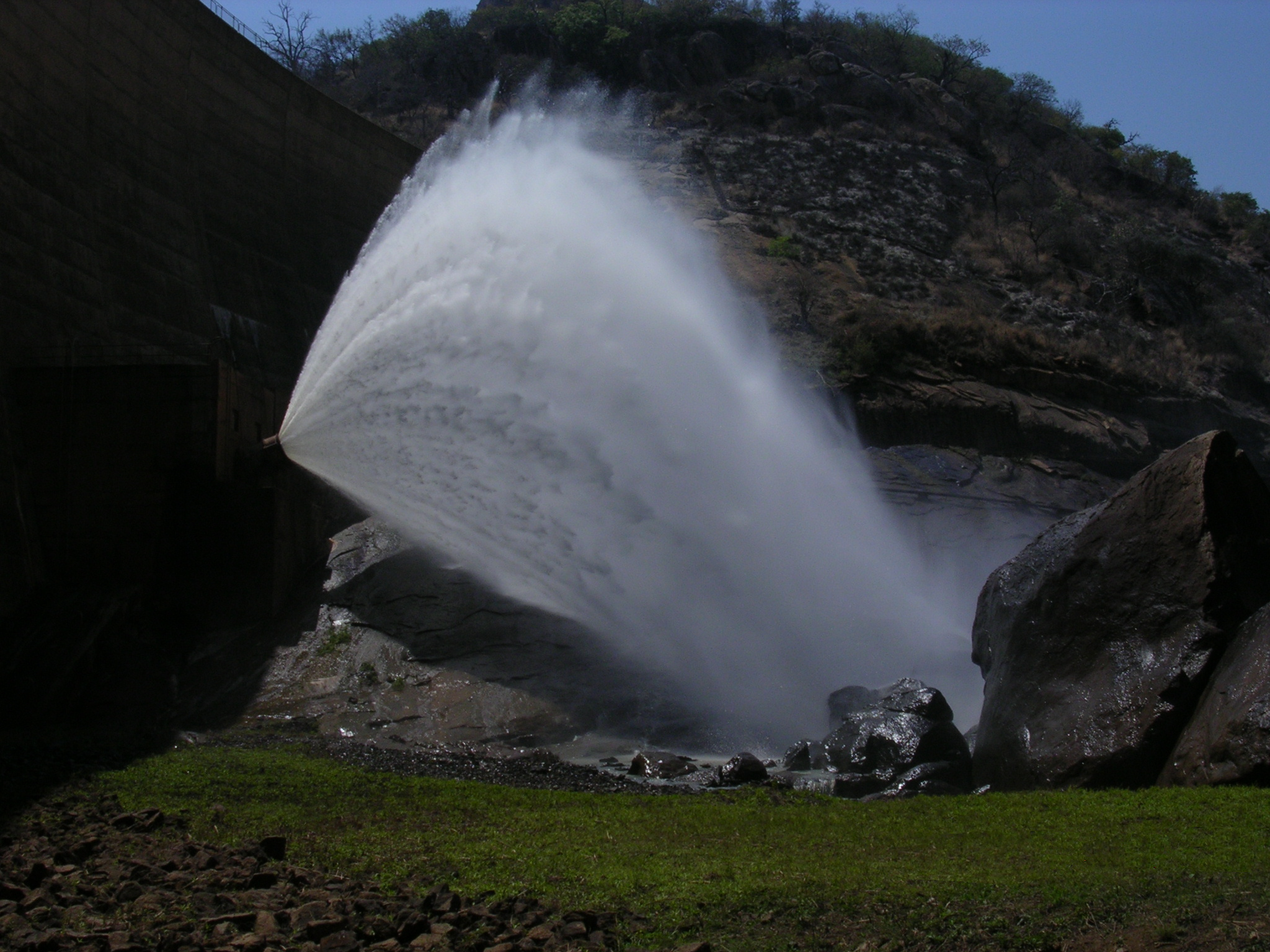
Water released from Manyuchi Dam, Mwenezi.

In addition to a number of small weirs, there is one major dam on the Mwenezi River: Manyuchi Dam in Mwenezi (District), which supplies water to Rutenga and for the irrigation of sugar cane. Water released from the Manyuchi Dam is taken up for these users at Rinette Weir.

Two additional dam sites have been identified between Manyuchi Dam and Mwenezi village, but development is not currently scheduled.

== Wildlife ==
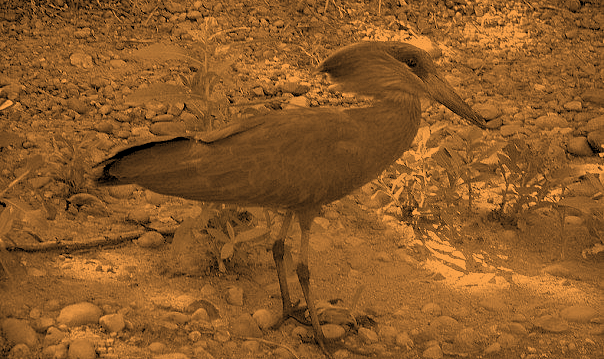
A hamerkop on the banks of the river. The locals call it 'Kondo' and there are songs about it. 2006

The river supports a diverse range of wildlife, including herons, hippos and Nile crocodiles. A number of people lose their lives to these crocodiles, as well as countless domestic animals like goats, calves and donkeys.

== See also ==
- Mushawe
- Limpopo River
- Manyuchi Dam
- Mwenezi District
