= Ronald Sengu =

Zimbabwean footballer (born 1988)

Personal information
- Date of birth: 16 April 1988 (age 38)
- Position: Defender

Senior career*
Years	Team	Apps	(Gls)
2007	Shooting Stars		
2008–2009	Lengthens		
2010–2011	CAPS United		
2012–2013	Harare City		
2014	Triangle		
2014	Chiredzi		
2015–2016	Harare City		

International career^{‡}
2008	Zimbabwe	1	(0)
- * Club domestic league appearances and goals as of 14 November 2020 ‡ National team caps and goals as of 14 November 2020

Ronald Sengu (born 16 April 1988) is a Zimbabwean football defender.
