= Alfred Nikita Mangena =

Zimbabwean politician (1943–1978)

Rodgers Alfred Nikita Mangena (16 March 1943 – 28 June 1978), born Rodgers Alfred Mangena in the Maranda area, commanded the Zimbabwe People's Revolutionary Army (ZIPRA), the militant branch of the Zimbabwe African People's Union (ZAPU), in the Rhodesian Bush War. Lookout Masuku led ZIPRA after Mangena's death in 1978. He was born of Bakae Mangena and Keorabile Ngwenya, he was a Ndebele of Swati origin(Hlubi clan), his roots trace to the first swati people of Queen Nyamazane who settled in Zimbabwe after defeating the last Mambo of the Rozvi kingdom.

In November 1975 ZAPU and the Zimbabwe African National Union formed the Zimbabwe People's Army in Mozambique. While the joint military force soon fell apart, when it successfully functioned Mangena served as the second-in-command.

Mangena led a ZIPRA uprising against ZAPU moderates in 1977 with hundreds of followers in camps in Zambia attacking ZAPU's headquarters in Lusaka. While Mangena did not intend to lead a coup against Joshua Nkomo, he wished to reassert his power over the organization's militant activities. Soon after the uprising he was assassinated.

The late Dr Nkomo loved Mangena very much and Mangena also had great respect for his leader. Even when Mangena went to Kabanga where he met his death, Dr Nkomo had told him again and again not to go. He left because he thought things were not going in the right direction. He was a hands-on commander.
