= Maranda, Zimbabwe =

Coordinates: 21°09′00″S 30°19′05″E

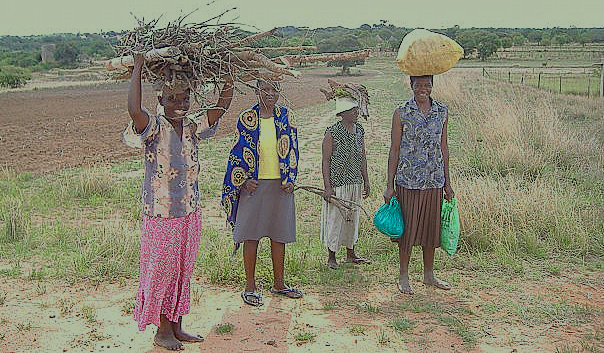
Back from gathering firewood in the forest, women in one of the villages in Maranda smile at the camera as they walk home, 2006

Maranda, locally known as "No. 1", is a small business centre on the northern edge of Mwenezi (District), Zimbabwe. It is the hometown of Dr. Love (Paul Matavire), the former popular musician and Nikita Mangena, Zimbabwe People's Revolutionary Army military leader during the Second Chimurenga war. It is a centre of trade in the district, with people coming to sell their cattle in week-long trade fairs. The centre has a clinic and government agriculture and water offices. The land is occupied by the Vapfumbi people who speak Chipfumbi of the Kalanga and Karanga family and also partly the VhaVenda people who speak Tshivenda language.

== Geography ==
Maranda is surrounded by granite mountains such as Bangwe, Rasha and Nemande. These are the source of the Mushawe River, which flows through the business centre and supplies the centre with water. The water is abstracted from the alluvial aquifer below the Mushawe River, and is generally available year-round.

Rainfall is erratic and the vegetation is savanna dominated by grasses and Mopane trees. In the days of old, the villagers used to plant millet and sorghum but these days most villagers plant maize on account of the high yields associated with it.

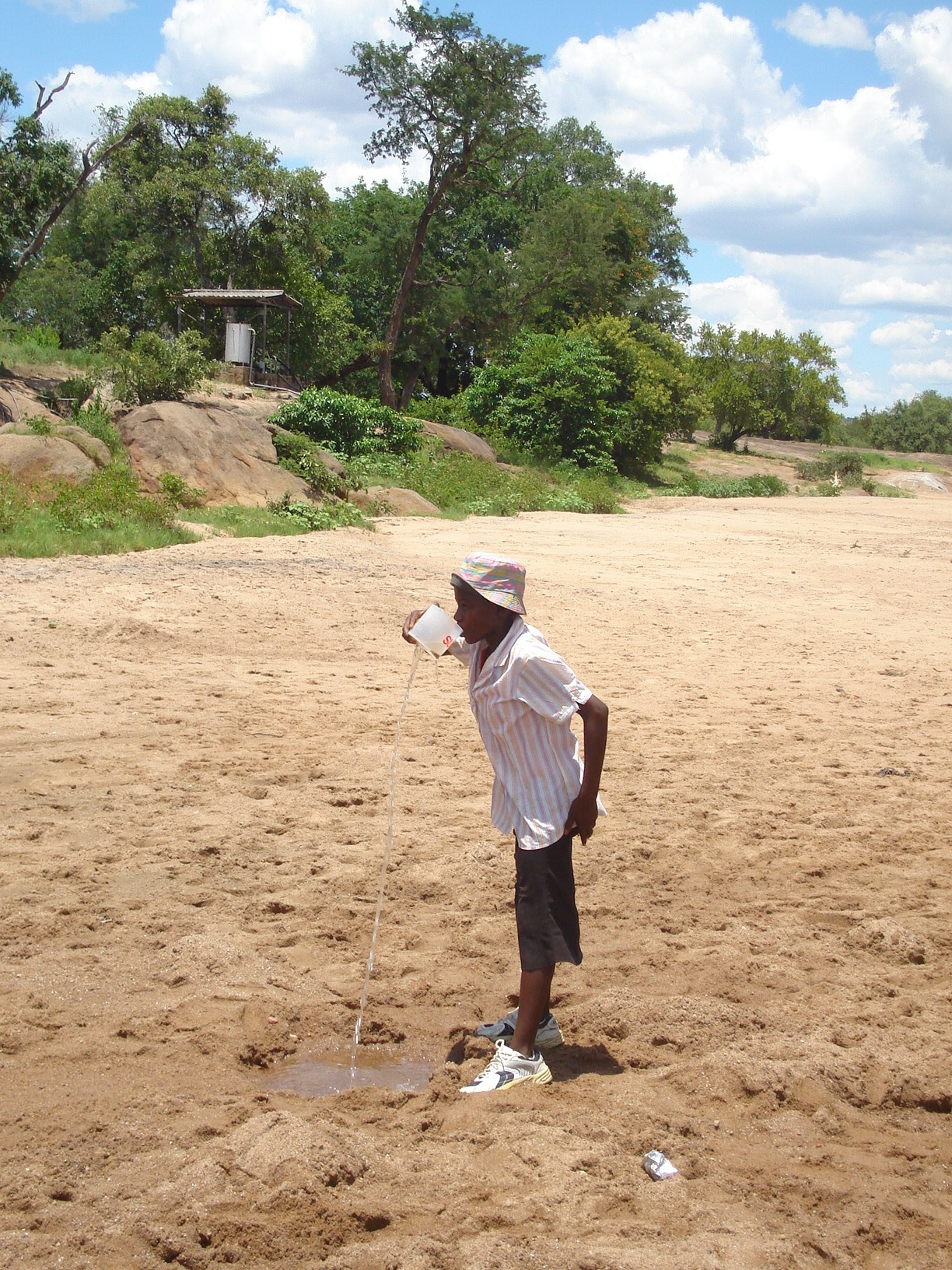
A young woman drinks water dug from the sand of the Mushawe alluvial aquifer. The pump for the Maranda water supply is in the background.

== Market ==
No. 1 is a popular destination in the district, especially during the week-long market days when residents from the surrounding villagers descend on the business centre to sell their merchandise. Most people sell their cattle, while other just come to the market to dance to sungura music from singers like Alick Macheso and Khiama Boys.

== Government and politics ==
Maranda is in ward 9, in the newly created House of Assembly seat of Mwenezi West.

== See also ==
- Mwenezi District
- Manyuchi Dam
- Mushawe River
- Mwenezi River
