= Rowan Nenzou =

Zimbabwean footballer (born 1982)

Personal information
- Date of birth: 14 December 1982 (age 43)
- Place of birth: Harare, Zimbabwe
- Position: Midfielder

Senior career*
Years	Team	Apps	(Gls)
2003	Black Rhinos		
2004–2005	Shabanie Mine		
2006–2007	Black Rhinos		
2008	Gunners		
2009	Black Rhinos		
2011	Shabanie Mine		
2012	Platinum		
2013	Hippo Valley		
2014	Chiredzi		
2014	Shabanie Mine		

International career^{‡}
2003–2005	Zimbabwe	3	(0)
- * Club domestic league appearances and goals as of 15 November 2020 ‡ National team caps and goals as of 15 November 2020

Rowan Nenzou (born 14 December 1982) is a retired Zimbabwean football midfielder.
