= Mwenezi District =

Coordinates: 21°30′S 31°00′E

Mwenezi Nuanetsi
- District
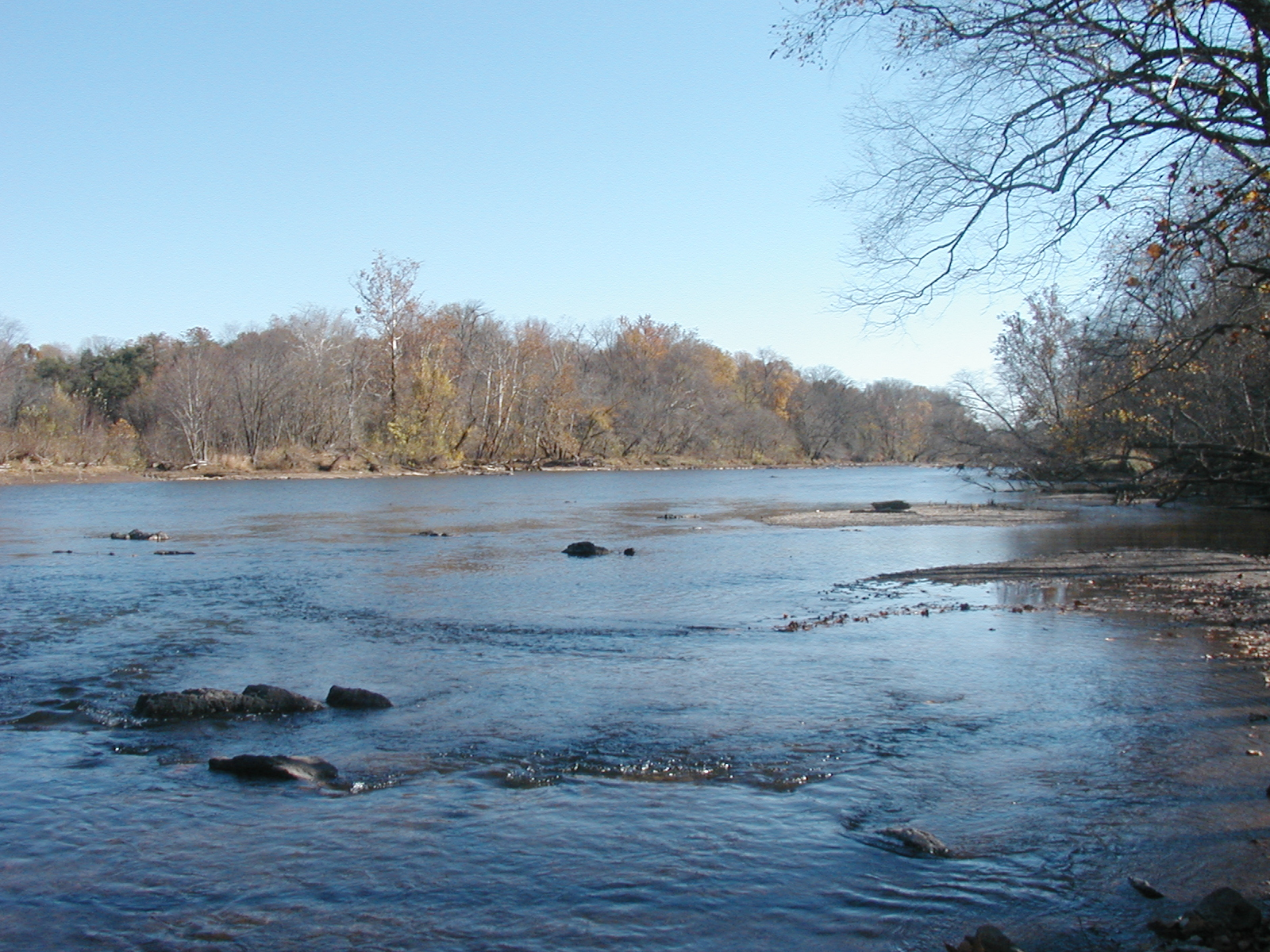
- Mwenezi River bisects the district in two on its way to join the Limpopo River in Mozambique in the south.
- Nickname: Masuture
- Motto: Zimbabwe's 2020 best District.
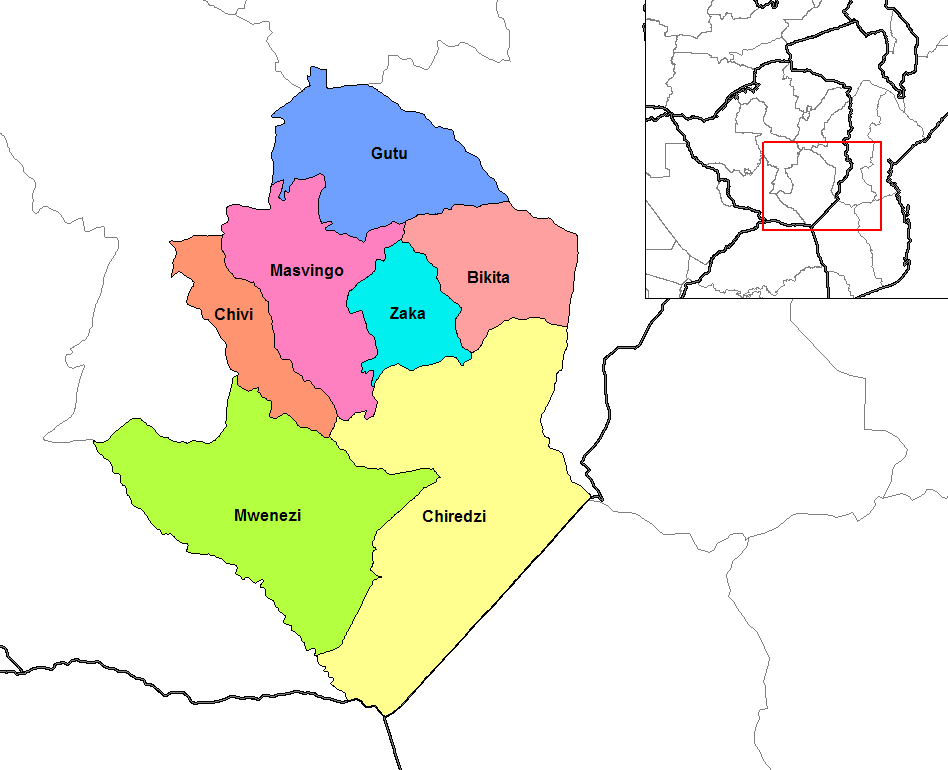
- Districts of Masvingo Province

- Masvingo Province constituency seats for the 2008 elections, showing the division of Mwenezi (District)
- Country: Zimbabwe
- Province: Masvingo
- District: Mwenezi
- Established: late 19th Century

Government
  - House of Assembly, MP: Kudakwashe Bhasikiti, (East)
  - House of Assembly, MP: Pilot Masukume (West)

Area
  - Total: 13,210 km^{2} (5,100 sq mi)

Population (2022 Census)
  - Total: 209,327
  - Density: 15.85/km^{2} (41.04/sq mi)
- Time zone: UTC+2 (CAT)

Mwenezi, originally known as Nuanetsi, is a small district situated in southern Zimbabwe. It is bisected by the Mwenezi River and the A4 highway, the main thoroughfare that connects the town of Beitbridge, on the border with South Africa, to Masvingo.

== Background ==
Mwenezi derives its name from the Mwenezi River, which provides irrigation water to the sugarcane plantations in and around the Rutenga Business Center. Although the police station is located along the highway, the main administrative offices are located at the Neshuro Business Center. The weather is hot and dry throughout the year, except during the summer when rain is frequent. In 2002, the population of the drought-prone district was estimated to be 126,000, up by 25,000 from 1992, the year of the drought.

Mwenezi lies in natural regions four and five. The district is prone to droughts and experiences low mean annual rainfall. The majority of households in Mwenezi depend on agricultural production, like livestock rearing. The small amounts of rainfall have created a desire amongst households in Mwenezi to shift more towards livestock farming, especially cattle and goats, although the majority of households indicate that they have not been able to restock since the drought of 1992.

== Education ==
As in other rural parts of the country, the schools in Mwenezi are government run, although some have historical links with missionary Christian denominations. There is one boarding school, Lundi Secondary School (run by the Free Methodist Church). The fact that all the secondary schools (other than Lundi) were established after independence, is testimony to the marginalization of the district and the "catching up" it needs to do. Though Zimbabwe has one of the highest literacy rates in Sub-Saharan Africa, in some Mwenezi communities, such as Maranda, a former designated native reserve before independence in 1980, the rate being as low as 50 percent.

=== Secondary and primary schools ===
Notable schools in Mwenezi include Lundi Secondary School, situated along the Masvingo- Beitbridge Road, Masuture secondary school situated along Masvingo-Beitbridge Road just 60 km away from Lundi Christian high school, Mabhare Secondary School, north of the Mwenezi River but close to Manyuchi Dam, Dengenya Primary School, between Mwenezi and the Mushawe River, Kuwirirana Secondary School, Guiding Star Secondary School. Masogwe Baptist Secondary that was established in 2004 by Pst Nhamo Chigohi on the Neshuro Rd, Maranda High, Hlezana Secondary, Mwenezi Government School, Budirirai Secondary School, Rufaro Secondary School, Masuture Secondary School, Makawire Primary School, Shazhaume Primary School, Pambe Primary School, Zvirikure Primary School, Sarahuro Primary School, Masongwe Primary School, Hebron High School, Neshuro Secondary School, Neshuro Primary School, Rutenga Primary School, Gegare Primary School, Matibi Primary School. However, not all villages have secondary schools. Some students, especially those from villages along the Mwenezi River, below the main wall of the Manyuchi Dam, have to walk long distances to school, about fifteen to twenty kilometers. This state of affairs discourages students from going to school, instead opting to cross the border and go to South Africa.

== Economy ==
The district's main employers are sugarcane plantations in Rutenga, Triangle and Chiredzi all connected by a railway line from Bulawayo. The cattle ranchers, before the influx of commercial farms in 2000, used to employ many people. As in most rural districts in the country, many people are also employed in the civil service mainly as teachers and nurses.

The people in the district had always trekked to the mines of South Africa. However, the number of migrant workers has increased in recent times due to the economic recession that Zimbabwe has been going through. Few young people remain in the villages across the district, preferring to take their chances in South Africa working one menial contract job after the next. The Beitbridge on the border with South Africa makes their trek easier.

In the early 2010's, fish farming projects were introduced in several major dams as a way to combat poverty in the district caused by the drought induced decline in agriculture.

In 2024, Rutenga - within Mwenezi District - became home to a new agro-processing complex for paprika and sesame, backed by Sustainable Agriculture Technology (SAT) and investors. The projects operate under PapriAfrika and SesAfrika, allowing smallholder farmers a 24.5 % share, and process up to 840 tonnes of paprika annually alongside sesame value-addition products such as oil and dehulled seeds.

=== Tourism ===
In the past, the district generated some revenue from tourism, with large numbers of tourists visiting the private game parks in the district and the nearby Manyuchi Dam.

=== Business centers ===
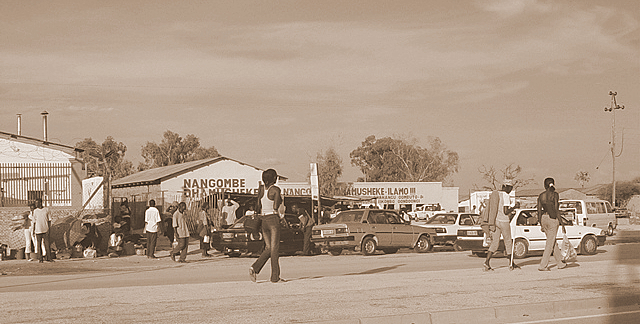
A scene at Rutenga, along the highway between Masvingo and Beitbridge, 2006

The district has many service and business centres of varying sizes and economic vibrancy. Among these, Neshuro, Sarahuru, Sengejira, Maranda and Chaoma are noteworthy. The withdrawal of government-funded grain collection and distribution facilities as part of neoliberal reforms in the 1990s and the recent (1998–2008) economic woes of the country led to the decline of these centers. However, some, like Neshuro, have continued to grow, with water and poor roads the major deterrents to investment.

== Government and politics ==
Akin to other districts in Masvingo Province, the ZANU-PF party dominates politics. Ever since the country's independence, the constituency has been represented by a ZANU-PF party member in the parliament of Zimbabwe. Isaiah Shumba was the representative for Mwenezi, winning both the 2000 and 2005 elections on the ZANU-PF ticket.

=== General elections 2008 ===
The district now sends two members to Zimbabwe's new House of Assembly. Each of the wards in the district has an elected official who works in the rural district council. The district has been a stronghold of ZANU-PF since independence in 1980, a trend that didn't change in the 2008 elections.

The district was divided into two parts, namely Mwenezi West and Mwenezi East, for the general elections of 2008. Candidates from both the Movement for Democratic Change – Tsvangirai party and ZANU-PF competed for the two constituency seats. The winners will represent the district in the House of Assembly in the parliament of Zimbabwe. Mwenezi, together with Chivi (District), will elect a member to the new Zimbabwe Senate.

==== Political violence ====
Ever since 2000, there have been sporadic reports of violence in the district, mostly perpetrated by ZANU-PF supporters and war veterans on their perceived enemies. Isiah Shumba, the former MP for Mwenezi constituency, was arrested with twelve other ZANU-PF supporters for political violence and intimidation in the run-up to the harmonized elections of 2008. He took a violent path after he had lost in the ZANU-PF primary election. He had run for the Mwenezi East seat and had lost to Kudakwashe Bhasikiti (2,793 votes) and Cletos Muchara (214 votes). Shumba was a distant third, garnering only 48 votes.

==== Mwenezi East ====
Eight wards comprise this part of the district, which includes the land north of the Mwenezi River: 2, 3, 4, 5, 6, 7, 13, and 18. Bhasikiti Kudakwashe (Zanu-PF), Murambwi Ananias (MDC Tsvangirai), and Chidyamakono Tavengwa (Independent) ran for the Mewnezi East House of Assembly seat with Bhasikiti winning with 9696 to Murambwi's 2477.

==== Mwenezi West ====
Election percentages.

There are nine wards in the district: 10, 11, 12, 14, 15, 16, and 17. Mwenezi West comprises the area that is south of the Mwenezi River, including Manyuchi Dam. Masukume Pilot (Zanu-PF) and Tedious Douglas (MDC Tsvangirai) battled for the Mwenezi West constituency. Pilot won the contest with a landslide of 12,636 to Tedeous's 1,577.

== Infrastructure development ==
=== Road network ===
The district is serviced by a network of mostly gravel roads. Apart from the shoulder-less A1 highway, all other roads in the district are of macadamized gravel roads. During the rainy season, despite the best efforts of DDF, they get washed away. Most places are accessible only by four-wheel-drive vehicles. Some of the vital bridges destroyed during Cyclone Eline in 2000 have yet to be repaired. The primary mode of transport is by donkey cart, and phone lines connect most of the business centers with the outside world.

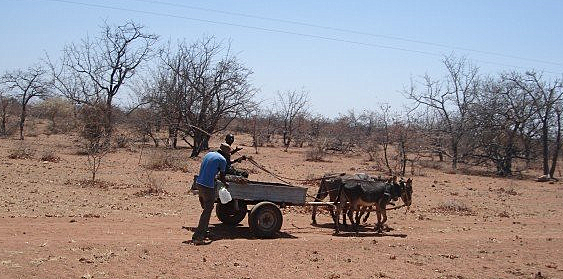
A donkey cart along the gravel roads that service the district. Most people in Mwenezi rely on donkey carts for transport.

== Health care ==
Public health care is delivered at four levels meant to function as a referral chain. The entry level includes rural health centers, rural hospitals, and urban clinics (whose services do not require an attending physician). District hospitals exist at the first referral level, provincial and general hospitals at the second referral level. The third referral level includes central and special hospitals.

Most health care facilities in the district are owned and run by the government's Ministry of Health & Child Welfare, although local communities are involved in the management of some clinics. The main referral hospital is Mwenezi District Hospital at Neshuro. Previously the Neshuro clinic, it was upgraded by the Chinese to a rural hospital in the late 1980s. The Catholic-run Matibi Mission hospital to the northwest (bordering the Mberengwa District) also acts as another referral hospital. Several poly-clinics are scattered across the district offering primary health care. In recent years, as the economy of Zimbabwe has declined, shortage of drugs and equipment at hospitals emerged, although staffing levels by the end of 2010 had improved. Communities also rely heavily on traditional medicine.

The major diseases that affect the people in the district include TB and malaria. Owing to the low rates of literacy, especially in Mwenezi West, TB remains a threat to the district as the affected usually don't finish their treatment regimes.

=== HIV/AIDS ===
The remoteness of the district from other areas has spared it from the scourge of HIV/AIDS. However, cases of the malady have been reported to be on the increase in recent years as the highly mobile youth that venture to South Africa in search of jobs gets exposed to the virus and bring it back.

== General ==
The area south of the Mwenezi River, beyond the Maranda communal lands, is dominated by some of the country's largest ranches. Nuanesti Ranch, reputed to be the largest freestanding ranch in the province, if not the whole country, is found in the district along the A1 highway between Masvingo and Beitbridge. These ranches provide basic infrastructure, from schools and clinics to roads and dip-tanks.

Since the farm invasions of early 2000, peasant farmers from the communal lands of both Matibi, north of the Mwenezi River, and those from the Maranda communal lands south of the river, invaded some of the arid ranches found in the district, changing the land use map.

== Famous People ==
Paul Matavire, the singer who sang in the Paul Matavire and the Jairos Jiri Band, created many songs before his untimely death in 2005.

== See also ==
- Masvingo
- Manyuchi Dam
- Masvingo Province
