= Paul Matavire =

- Also known as: Dr. Love
- Born: Paul Matavire; August 3, 1961
- Origin: Maranda, Mwenezi (District), Masvingo Province, Zimbabwe
- Died: October 18, 2005 (aged 44) Rutenga, Mwenezi (District), Masvingo Province, Zimbabwe
- Genres: Sungura, Jit, Rhumba.
- Occupation: Singer social worker
- Years active: 1982–2005

Paul Matavire was a blind Zimbabwean musician and songwriter born in Maranda, Mwenezi District. He rose to prominence in the 1980s when he joined the Jairos Jiri Band based in Bulawayo at the Jairos Jiri Rehabilitation Centre. He was then elected to lead the Jairo Jiri Band, as one of Zimbabwe's finest musicians to emerge after the country gained independence from Britain in 1980. He died at the age of 44, in 2005, at his farm in Rutenga, Masvingo. By the time of his death, he is believed to have been an owner of a large herd of cattle, having spent the last days of his life as a farmer.

== Music career ==
The Jairos Jiri Band are representatives of Jairos Jiri, the Disabled Musicians' Society. They were led by Matavire, who was a social worker, and had been left blind by glaucoma as a child. While his deep lyrics garnered him the nickname of Dr. Love, his songs were also known for their social commentary.

Matavire's music gained popularity due to his humor, the use of rich and deep Shona lyrics, and his willingness to tread on what many regarded sensitive societal issues. His songs touched on anything from religion to marital issues, but still retaining the humor that made it ever so popular. His hit song "Dhiyabhorosi Nyoka" stirred controversy at its release by its reference to the biblical Eve, and women in general, as the root cause of every man's troubles, while at the same time acknowledging the pivotal role women play in society. Matavire's music has remained popular even among the young in Zimbabwe years after his death. He is also remembered for his willingness to experiment with the Shona language in his songs, coining phrases that have remained part of everyday conversation among the Shona-speaking people in the country.

The JJB grew in popularity during the late 1980s, and toured abroad. Their success was interrupted by Matavire's one-year incarceration on rape charges. The band commemorated his 1991 release with the song "Back from College", which narrated his experiences in jail. The band, composed of various musicians under Matavire's leadership, released 13 albums, the latest being 2003's Zimbe Remoto.

Matavire was also known for leading a simple life. Semi-retired before his death, he balanced music with tending goats and cattle in Rutenga where he moved after 2000 when he was awarded a farm by the government. Just like his music, however, Matavire had his own fair share of controversies. These saw him serving a one-year sentence for rape in the early 1990s. At the time of his death, there were media reports of him having ejected a commercial farmer and taken over the farm, including the livestock, during Zimbabwe's controversial land reform programme. For most Zimbabweans, however, Matavire is fondly remembered for his music more than anything else.

== Albums ==
- The Sounds of The Jairos Jiri Band (Featuring Angifuni Ukwendiswa) (with Jairos Jiri Band, 1985 LP)
- J.J.B. Style (with Jairos Jiri Band, 1986 LP)
- Amatshakada (with Jairos Jiri Band, 1988 LP)
- Ethno-Rock Zimbabwe (live album of 1988 concert in Stuttgart, Germany with Jairos Jiri Band, 1989 LP)
- Matavire Mbune (with Jaios Jiri Band, 1989 LP)
- Doctor Love, Volume 2 (1990 LP)
- Back From College (1991 LP)
- Dhindindi Fulltime (Reissue of Doctor Love Volume 2, 1992 LP)
- Akanaka Akarara (with the Hit Machine, 1993 LP)
- Gakanje (with the Hit Machine, 1995 LP)
- Mapanga Muhomwe (with the Hit Machine, 1995 LP)
- Asipo Haapo (with the Hit Machine, 1996 CASS)
- Fadza Customer (with the Hit Machine, 1998 CASS)
- Govanai (1999 CASS)
- Zimbe Remoto (2003 CD)
- Gonye Remari (2004, CD)
- Paul Matavire, Vol. 3 (2005, CD)
