= Operation Motel =

Zimbabwe-Rhodesian military operation in Zambia

- Part of the Rhodesian Bush War
- Location: Zambia Operation Motel (Zambia)
- Objective: Destroy ZIPRA camp in Northern Zambia.
- Date: 23 August 1979
- Outcome: Zimbabwe-Rhodesian victory
- Casualties: Many ZIPRA camps were destroyed, and many ZIPRA guerillas were killed

Operation Motel was a Zimbabwe-Rhodesian military operation in Zambia with clandestine assistance from the South African Air Force (SAAF) during the Rhodesian Bush War. The Rhodesian Air Force planned raids against a ZIPRA camp in Northern Zambia.

== Operation ==
The operation consisted of two raids on a ZIPRA camp on 23 August 1979. The Rhodesian and South African Canberra bombers and Hawker Hunter strike aircraft took off at 09h40 for Operation Motel I with the aircraft forming over Victoria Falls before conducting a low-level bombing attack on a camp 32 km south of Solwezi in Northern Zambia.

== Aftermath ==
See also: Operation Motel II

The same formation left again for Operation Motel II at 15h30 for another attack on the same target and the aircraft returned to base with one of the SAAF Canberra bombers was damaged by friendly fire after taking shrapnel from bomb explosions.
