= Ntalale =

- Village
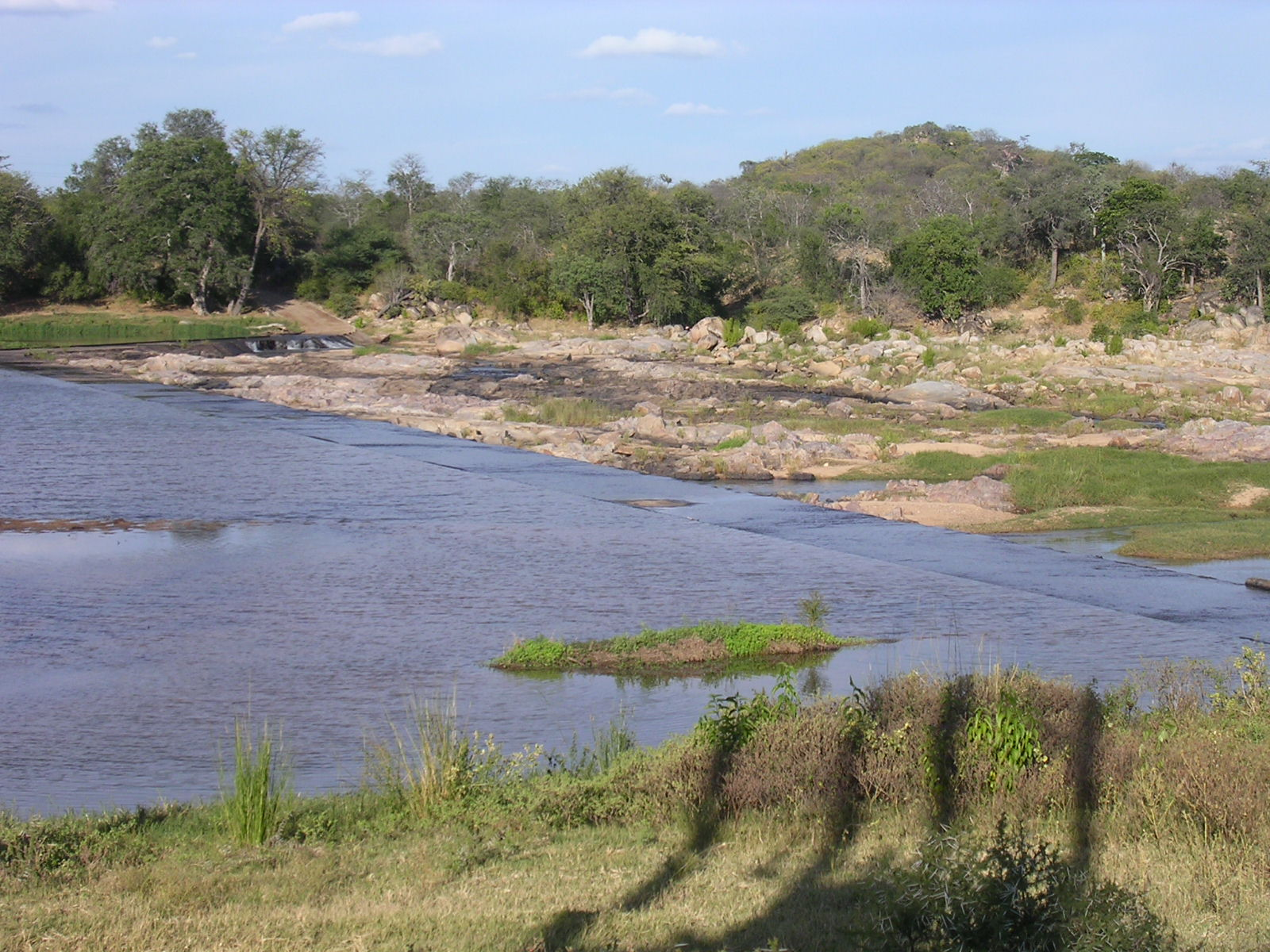
- The Ntalale causeway

- Location within Zimbabwe
- Coordinates: 21°20′52″S 28°52′42″E
- Country: Zimbabwe
- Province: Matabeleland South
- District: Gwanda District
- Time zone: UTC+2 (Central Africa Time)

Ntalale is a village in Gwanda District of Matabeleland South province in southern Zimbabwe.

There is a primary school, a secondary school, a clinic and shops at the village, and a causeway over the Thuli river east of the village.

ZIPRA soldier and intelligence officer Austin Moyo and musician and poet Lerato Ndlovu were born at Ntalale.
