= Dabengwa =

Dabengwa is a surname. Notable people with the surname include:

- Dumiso Dabengwa (1939–2019), Zimbabwean politician
- Keith Dabengwa (born 1980), Zimbabwean cricketer
