= Manjirenji Dam =

Dam in Zimbabwe

- Official name: Manjirenji Dam
- Location: Chiredzi
- Coordinates: 20.6262°S 31.6094°E
- Construction began: 1964-1967

Dam and spillways
- Type of dam: Rockfill dam with inclined clay core
- Impounds: Chiredzi River
- Height: 51 metres (167 feet)
- Length: 382 metres (1,253 feet)
- Spillways: 2
- Spillway capacity: 2 x 15.2m x 10.4m radial gates

Reservoir
- Total capacity: 284.2 million cubic metres
- Catchment area: 1536 km² (593 sq mi)
- Surface area: 2020 ha (5000 acres)
- Maximum water depth: 47 metres (154 feet)
- Discharge capacity: 2730 m³/s Max Water Depth: 47 metres

Manjirenji Dam, formerly known as Lake McDougal, lies in south eastern Zimbabwe, east of Masvingo. It was built to provide irrigation water to the farming estates on the lowveld to the southwest, around the town of Chiredzi, where the main crop has been sugar cane.

The lake and environs are protected as Manjirenji Dam Recreational Park.
