= Gonarezhou National Park =

National park in Zimbabwe

- IUCN category II (national park)
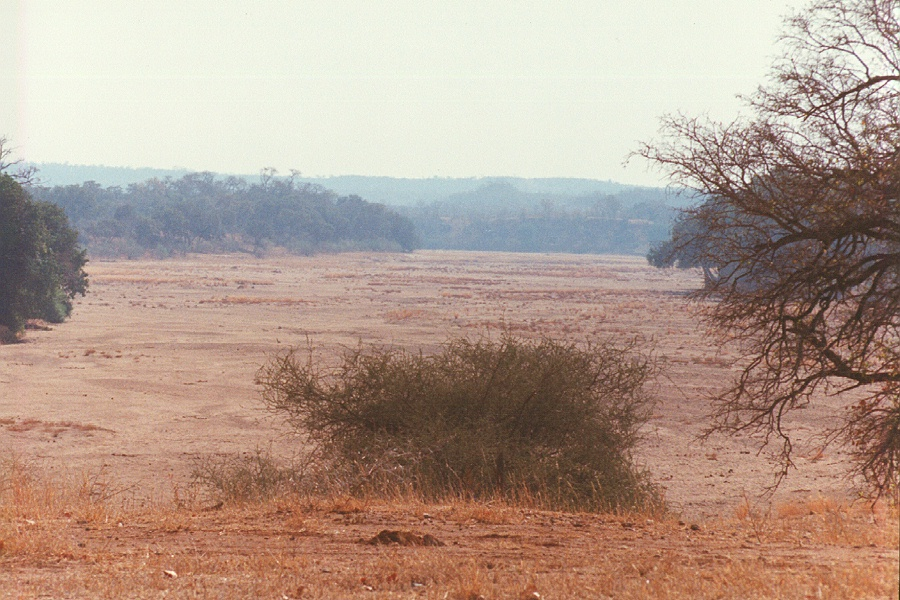
- Buffalo Bend on the Mwenezi River, Gonarezhou National Park, Zimbabwe
- Interactive map of Gonarezhou National Park
- Location: Chiredzi (District), Zimbabwe.
- Coordinates: 21°40′S 31°40′E
- Area: 5,053 km^{2} (1,951 sq mi)
- Established: 1975

Gonarezhou National Park is a national park located in southeastern Zimbabwe. It is situated in a relatively remote corner of Masvingo Province, south of Chimanimani along the Mozambique border. Owing to its vast size, rugged terrain and its location away from main tourist routes, large tracts of Gonarezhou remain pristine wilderness.

At 5,053 km^{2} (1,951 sq mi), Gonarezhou is the country's second-largest national park, after Hwange National Park. The name Gonarezhou is translated from the Shona meaning "The Place of Elephants".

Gonarezhou National Park forms part of the Great Limpopo Transfrontier Park, a peace park that links Gonarezhou with the Kruger National Park in South Africa and the Limpopo National Park in Mozambique. Animals can move freely between the three sanctuaries. The northeastern end of Gonarezhou is located within the Zambezian and mopane woodlands, while the southwestern end is located within the Southern Africa bushveld ecoregion.

== History ==
The Gonarezhou National Park was first established as a protected area in 1936 as a Game Reserve, eventually being proclaimed a National Park in 1975. The park has had a turbulent history and was closed to the public during the Rhodesian War and again during much of the Mozambique civil war but was re-opened in 1994. Between 1994 and 2007, the Gonarezhou National Park was wholly managed by the Zimbabwe Parks and Wildlife Management Authority, however the economic challenges in Zimbabwe up to 2007 meant that there was little reinvestment in infrastructure and protection of the Park. In 2007, the Zimbabwe Parks and Wildlife Management Authority entered into a financial and technical assistance model for the Gonarezhou National Park with the Frankfurt Zoological Society. This model lasted up until 2017 and focused on investing in infrastructure and the protection of the Park's resources. In March 2017, management of the Gonarezhou was handed over to the Gonarezhou Conservation Trust, a co-management partnership between the Zimbabwe Parks and Wildlife Management Authority and the Frankfurt Zoological Society. This co-management model, overseen by a board of trustees represented equally by both partners, was created to establish a platform to enhance investment into the long-term sustainability of the Park - a key feature of which being the retention of tourism funds at a Park level for direct reinvestment into the Gonarezhou.

== Features ==
The Gonarezhou National Park is one of the iconic wilderness areas of Africa, with relatively few tourists but boasting an amazing diversity of landscapes, features, and growing wildlife populations. By far, the most well-known and prominent feature of the Park is the Chilojo Cliffs, sandstone cliffs towering 180 m (590 ft) high and running for some 20 km (12 mi) along the south bank of the Runde River. Other key features in the north of the Park are the two large natural pans, Tembwahata and Machanu, formed at the junction of the Save River and Runde River. In the central and southern areas of the Park are the Naymtongwe Plateau, a remnant of the Chilojo Cliffs, the Ntambambomvu Red Hills, densely wooded hill slopes standing above the Malvernia sand beds and the Mwenezi River Valley, and the Samalema Gorge, where the Mwenezi River carves through solid igneous rock-forming a braided river gorge.

=== Fauna ===
Historically the park has been a habitat for the endangered Cape wild dog (Lycaon pictus); and in 2010 there were several sightings of wild dogs in the park. It is thought that the cross-border link to national parks in Mozambique would be the best opportunity to restore or preserve the viability of this species in adjacent national parks in South Africa and Mozambique. Other mammals that inhabit the park are savannah elephant, South African giraffe, hippopotamus, Cape buffalo, Chapman's zebra, blue wildebeest, south-central black and southern white rhinoceros, southeastern lion, African leopard, Southern cheetah, and spotted hyena.

== Accommodation and camping ==
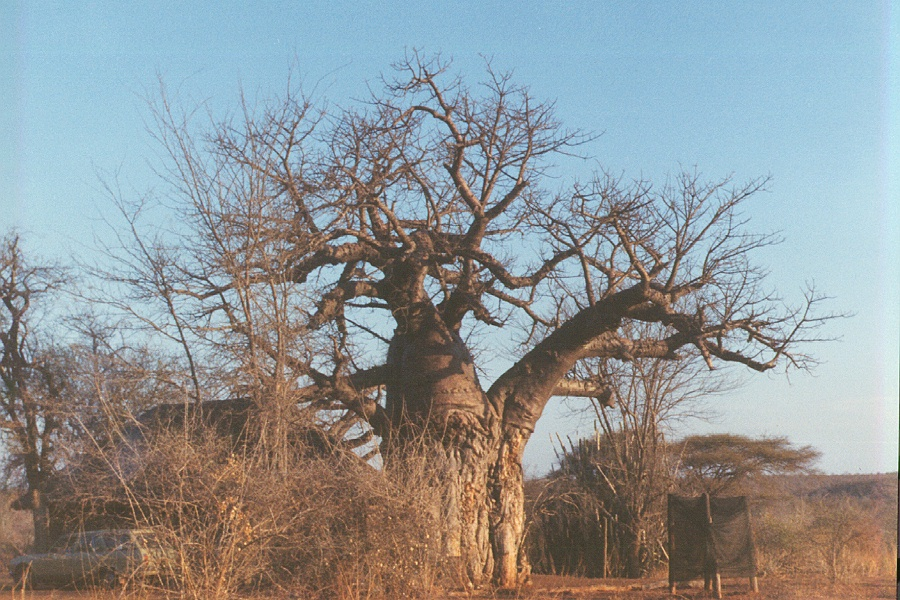
Swimuwini Rest Camp

- Swimuwini Rest Camp - managed by the National Parks and Wildlife Authority, this is self-catering accommodation on the Mwenezi River.

== Gallery ==
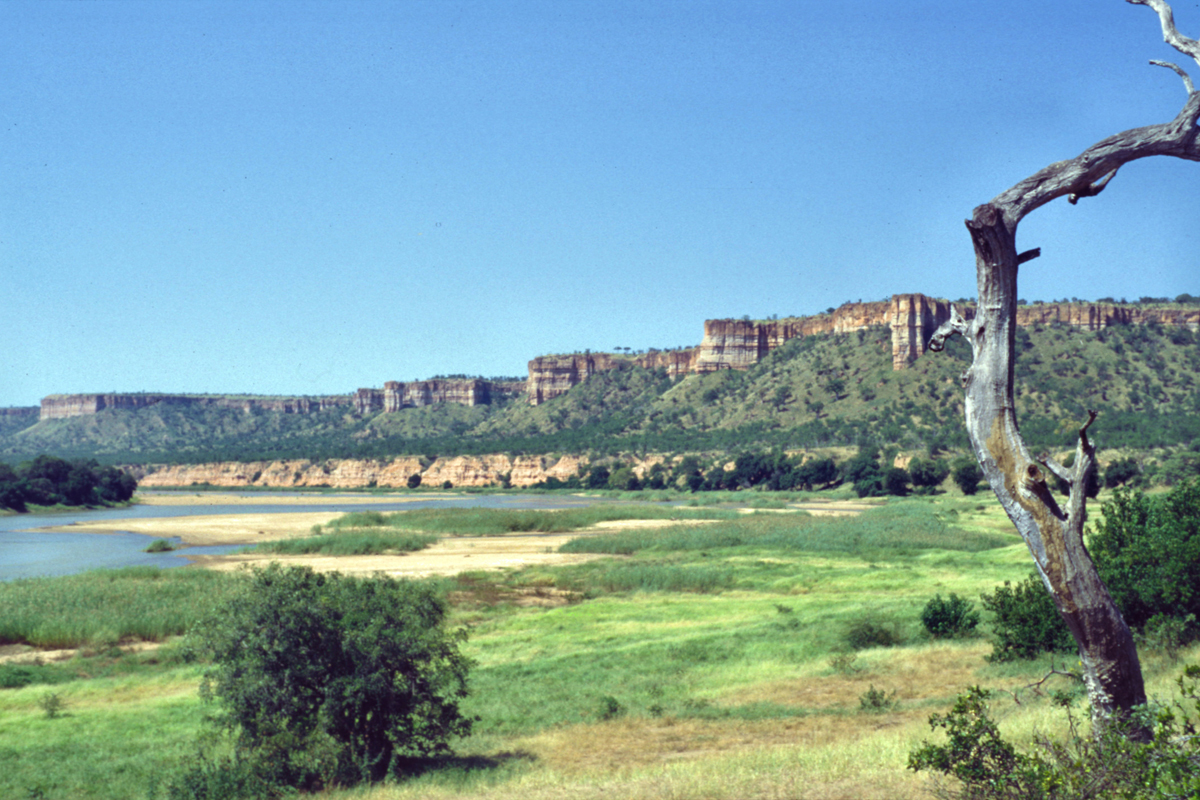
Chilojo Cliffs

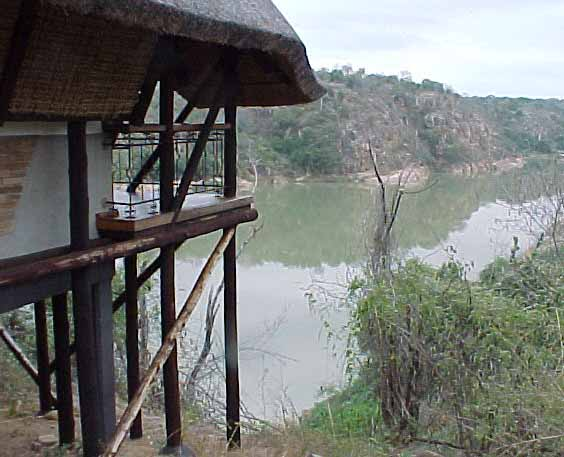
Chilo Lodge

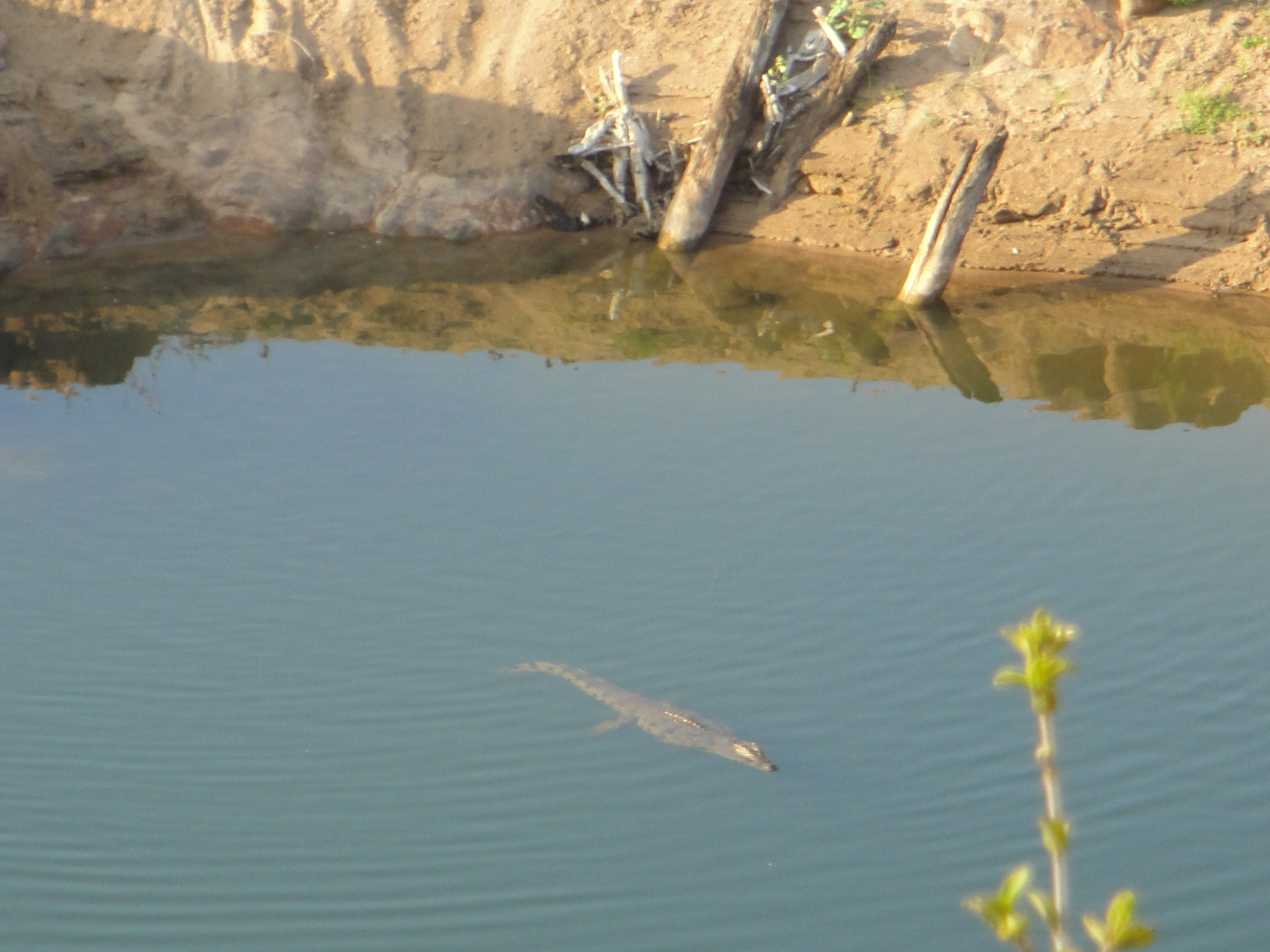
Crocodile, Makokwani Pools

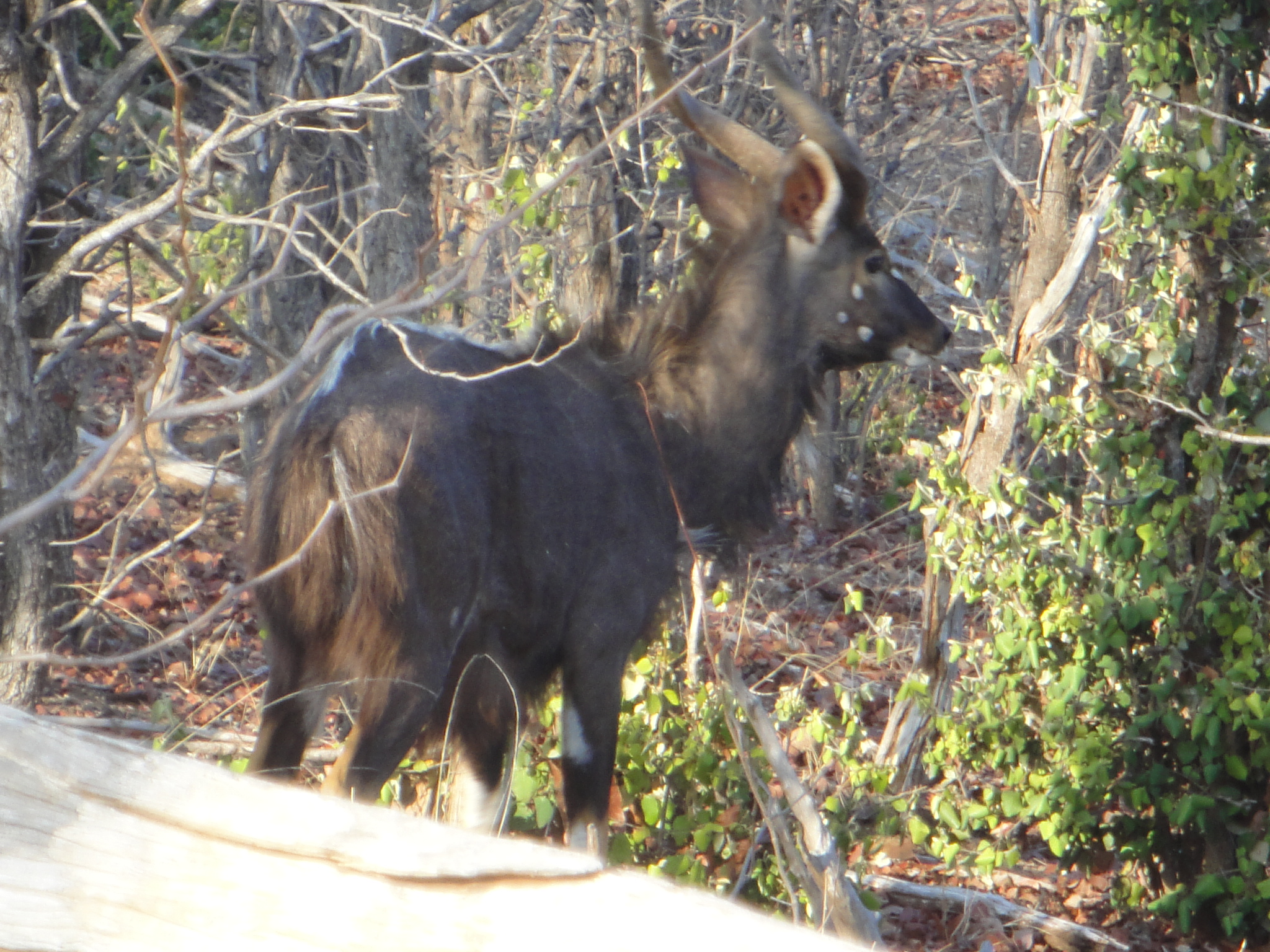
Nyala

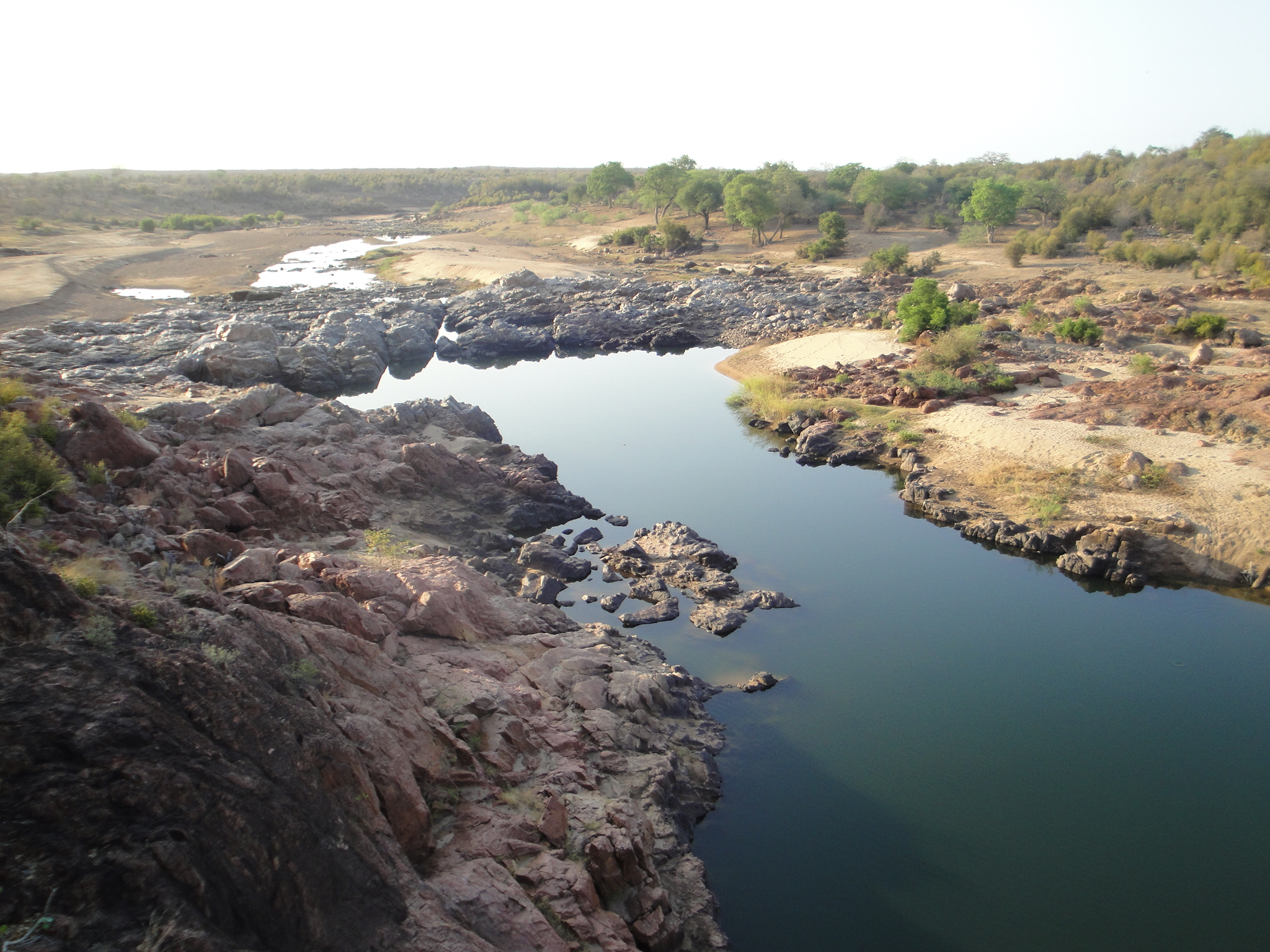
Makokwani Pools

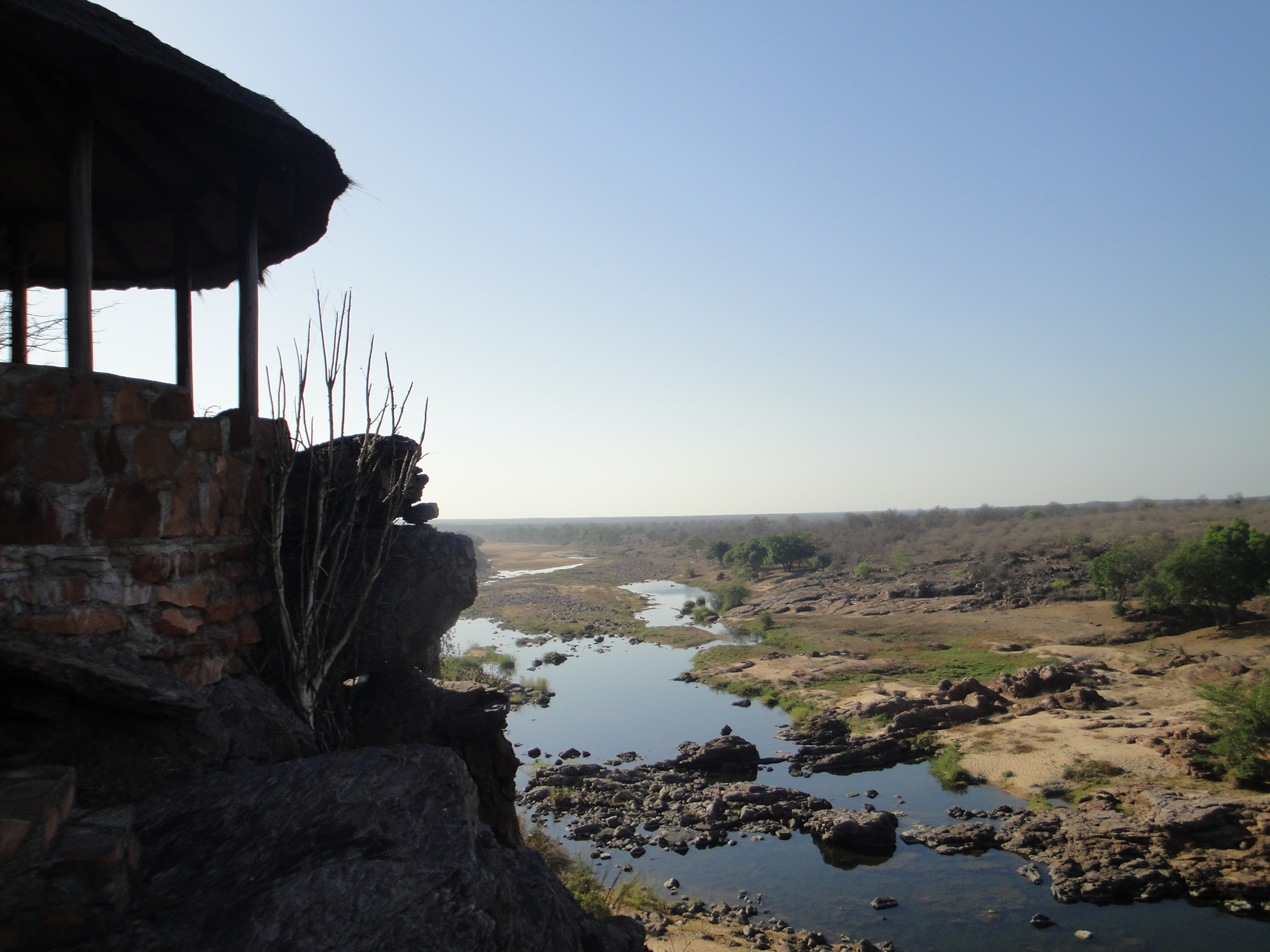
Rossi Pool and hide

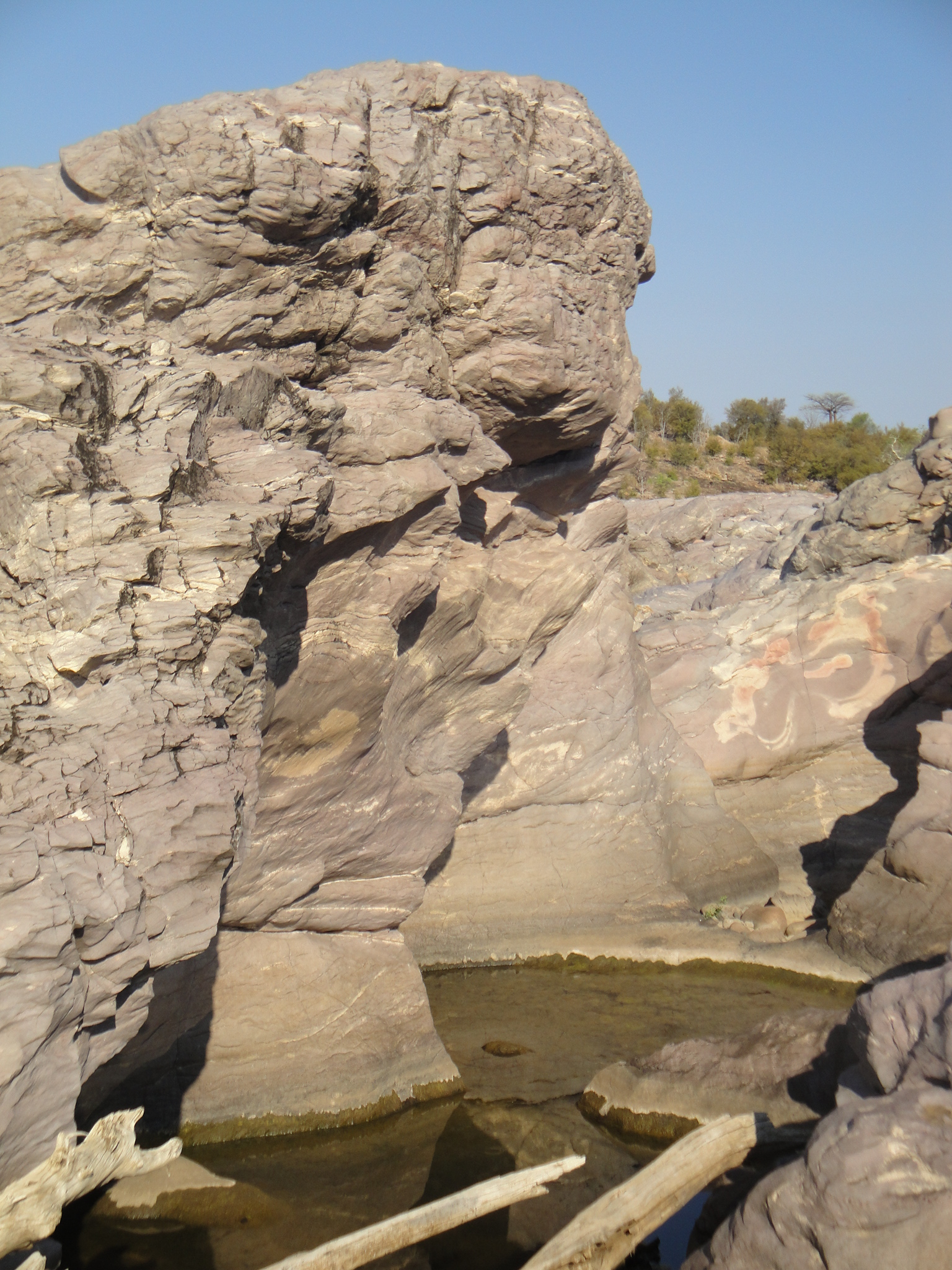
Samalena Gorge

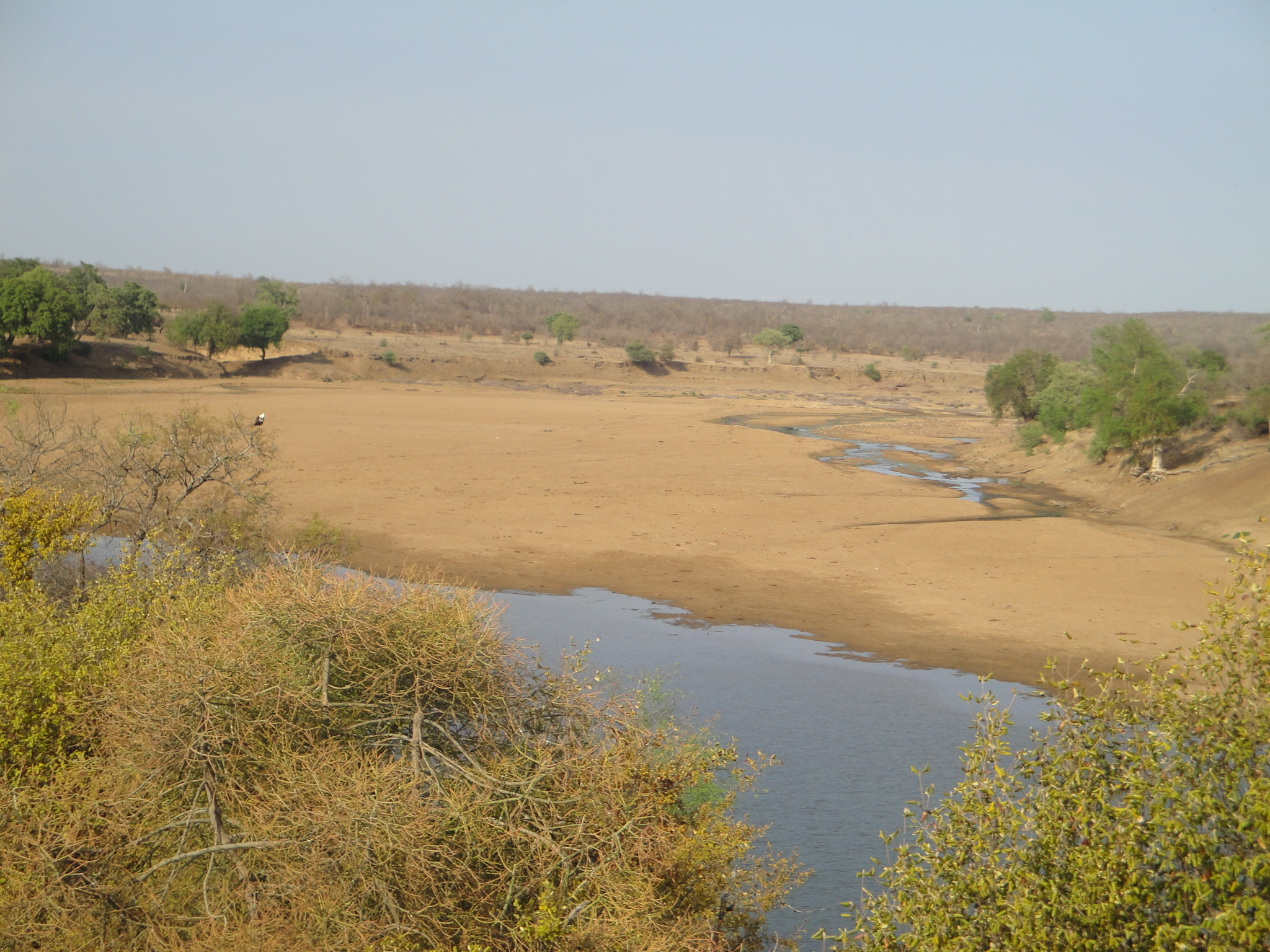
View from Wright's Tower

== See also ==
- Chiredzi District
- Chiredzi River
- Malilangwe
