= Mushawe =

Coordinates: 21°07′S 30°28′E

Mushawe River
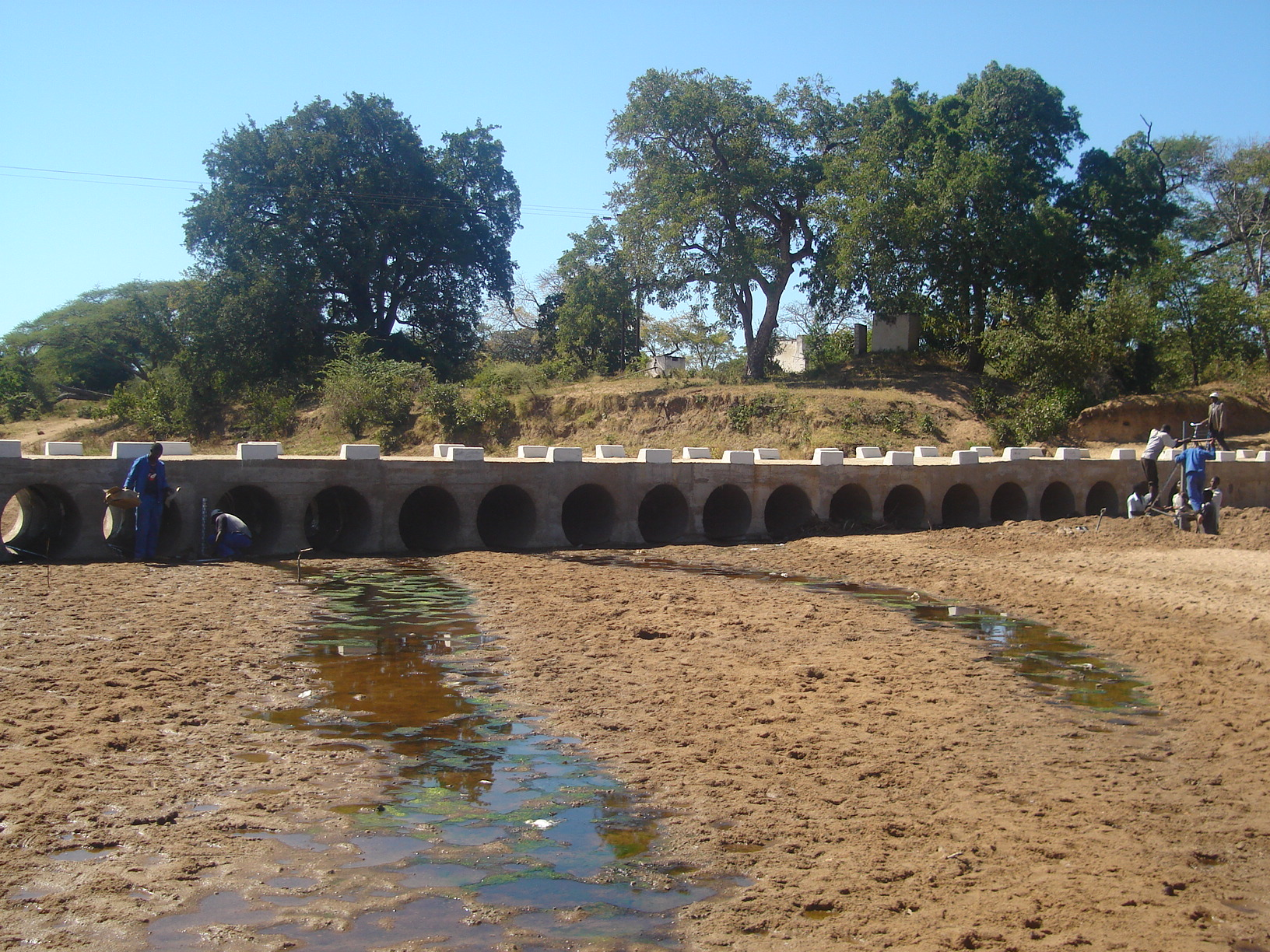
- The Mushawe River at Maranda (No. 1) Business Centre.

Location
- Country: Zimbabwe

Physical characteristics
- Source
  - location: South Central Zimbabwe
- Mouth
  - location: Mwenezi River
- Basin size: Mwenezi District

The Mushawe River (alternative spelling Mushawi River) is a right-bank tributary of the Mwenezi River in Zimbabwe. It rises in the Nemande mountain area and flows through the Maranda area to join the Mwenezi River downstream of Manyuchi Dam, Mwenezi District.

== Hydrology ==
The Mzingane River is an ephemeral river with flow generally restricted to the months when rain takes place (November to March). However, the lower Mushawe River bed forms an alluvial aquifer, which generally holds water year-round.

In places, permanent to semi-permanent pools occur, providing habitat for crocodiles.

== Development ==
The Mushawe River is dammed at Dengenya. The dam was built to supply water for irrigation but is currently full of sand. There are also some small dams on the minor tributaries of the Mushawe River. Water for Maranda (No 1) Business Centre is abstracted from the alluvial aquifer below the Mushawe River, slightly upstream of the photo shown above.
