= Austin Moyo =

Zimbabwean soldier (1957–2018)

Austin Peter Moyo (1957 – 26 August 2018), nome de guerre Madayiza, was a Zimbabwean soldier and intelligence officer, who was born in Ntalale in Gwanda District.

Moyo joined the liberation struggle as a young man in 1974, becoming a ZIPRA fighter in the Northern Front 2. He became a sniper, and trained in intelligence in Lusaka. In 1977 became the intelligence officer for the Northern Front 2 regional command. He participated in the storming of the Rhodesian garrison at Siganda in Bubi District, during which a Canberra fighter aircraft was shot down.

During the ceasefire in December 1979, following the Lancaster House Agreement, Moyo was one of the ZIPRA security officers responsible for demobilisation at the assembly points for guerrillas, working alongside officers of the Commonwealth Monitoring Force.

After independence, Moyo worked for the Central Intelligence Organisation, holding the rank of Divisional Intelligence Officer at the time of his death. He lived at Cowdray Park in Bulawayo.

Moyo was injured in a motor vehicle accident and subsequently died at Mpilo Hospital in Bulawayo. After his death, he was declared a Provincial Hero, and buried in an official funeral at Bulawayo Provincial Heroes Acre. Minister Angeline Masuku said that Moyo was "a big and respectable man, who we regarded as our elder".
