= Dumiso Dabengwa =

Zimbabwean politician (1939–2019)

President of the Zimbabwe African People's Union
- In office 2008 – 23 May 2019

Chairperson of the Supreme Council of the Coalition of Democrats
- In office 20 October 2017 – 18 April 2018

Minister of Home Affairs of Zimbabwe
- In office 1992–2000

Personal details
- Born: 6 December 1939 Southern Rhodesia
- Died: 23 May 2019 (aged 79) Nairobi, Kenya
- Party: Zimbabwe African People's Union

Dumiso Dabengwa (6 December 1939 – 23 May 2019) was a Zimbabwean politician. He served as the head of Zimbabwe People's Revolutionary Army (ZIPRA) intelligence during the Rhodesian Bush War.

== Political career ==
During the Rhodesian Bush War the white minority nicknamed him the "Black Russian" because he trained in Moscow, Russia.

From 1992 to 2000, he served in the government as Minister of Home Affairs, and in 1991 he was appointed to the chair of the Matabeleland Zambezi Water Project. From 2003 to 2010 he was placed on the United States sanctions list.

Dabengwa ran as a ZANU-PF candidate for a seat in the House of Assembly from Nkulumane in the 2000 election, but was defeated by Movement for Democratic Change (MDC) candidate Gibson Sibanda. Dabengwa said that the MDC would have won even if its candidate was a donkey. He was again defeated in the March 2005 parliamentary election. He served as a member of the ZANU-PF Politburo, but he announced his support for the opposition candidacy of Simba Makoni in the March 2008 presidential election at a press conference in Bulawayo on 1 March 2008. A spokesman for Mugabe said that Dabengwa's defection to Makoni was unimportant, claiming that Dabengwa did not command any support. It was reported that Mugabe had offered to appoint Dabengwa as Vice-President following the election as the replacement for Joseph Msika, but that Dabengwa had declined.

Following the election, although no official results were immediately announced, Dabengwa said in April 2008 that Makoni's campaign had accomplished its mission by preventing either Mugabe or Tsvangirai from winning a first round majority; he opposed holding a run-off and favored the formation of a transitional government of national unity followed by a new election. He was critical of Mugabe, saying that he was too old and should make way for younger leadership, but also criticized Tsvangirai, comparing him to former Zambian President Frederick Chiluba and saying that a Tsvangirai victory would have been celebrated by the whites.

=== Zimbabwe African People's Union ===
Dabengwa was the leader of the revived Zimbabwe African People's Union (ZAPU), which is currently separating from the unity accord of 1987.

He was a candidate of ZAPU for President of Zimbabwe during the 2013 general election. He moved out of ZANU-PF together with Benny Ncube, whom they had trained together during the armed struggle.

== Treason charges ==
In 1982 Dabengwa was charged, with Lookout Masuku and four others, of treason by the Mugabe administration. They were acquitted due to lack of evidence in 1983. On release they were redetained under emergency regulations. At this time the Gukurahundi began.

Dabengwa was released four years later.

== Post script ==
During the launch of his childhood friend Jill Baker's Book, The Horns, Dabengwa admitted that not only had he encouraged her to write this historical novel, but he was also the alter ego of her character Jabu.
