= Hippo Valley Estate =

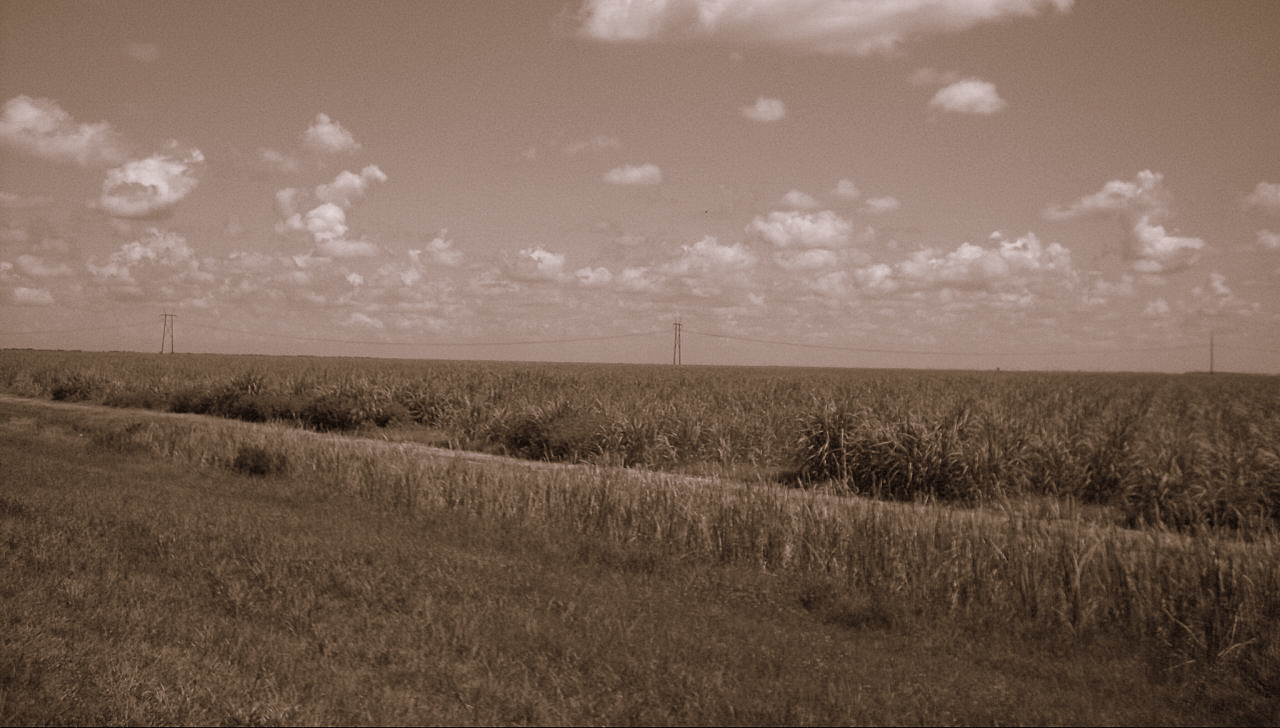
A sugarcane plantation on the Hippo Valley estate land

Hippo Valley Estate (ZSE: HIPO) is a sugar estate found near the town of Chiredzi in Chiredzi District of southeastern Zimbabwe, on the Runde River near the border with Mozambique.

== Background ==
It was established in 1956 as a citrus estate and soon it diversified with the first cane planted three years later in 1959. Canned Hippo Valley fruit was exported across southern Africa until the 1970s. In the wake of the sugar market crash in 1975, the estate initiated irrigation programs to water its sugar plantations. Today, it is the major producer of sugar and in conjunction with Triangle Estate, has a fifty:fifty holding in nearby Mkwasine Estate.

== Operations ==
The sugar plantations cover 124 square kilometres, and the company employs around 5,000 people. The Cane sugar mill of Hippo Valley Estate has a capacity of 300,000 tonnes of sugar per year, mostly raw sugar and brown sugar. It also produces molasses which is then turned into ethanol. It is a major employer of the residents of Tshovani, the lone high-density suburb in Chiredzi.

== Stock exchange ==
The company is a publicly listed company on the Zimbabwean Stock Exchange (under the ticker HIPPO). Tongaat Hulett Sugar is the largest shareholder via its wholly owned subsidiary Triangle Sugar and owns 50.35% of Hippo Valley Estates. Other shareholders include Tate & Lyle, the British agro company (10%).

== Relationship with Chiredzi ==
The company has a special relationship with the town. In addition to providing schools and healthcare facilities, it also supplies all the water used in the town. It also provides employment to the locals, thereby increasing their standard of living.

== Farm invasions ==
In 2004, parts of the estate were listed for confiscation by the government of Zimbabwe as part of its land reform project. Hippo Valley is an estate encompassed by the Triangle Estate and the Mkwasini Estate, all of them producers of sugar. With the advent of farm invasions that started in 2000, many changes have occurred to the estate as some parts of it have been taken over by peasants.
