= Lookout Masuku =

Zimbabwean Army commander (1940–1986)

Lieutenant General Lookout Khalisabantu Vumindaba Masuku (7 April 1940 – 5 April 1986) commanded the Zimbabwe People's Revolutionary Army (ZIPRA), the militant wing of the Zimbabwe African People's Union (ZAPU), during the Rhodesian Bush War. He served as the deputy commander of the Zimbabwe National Army until his arrest in 1982 for allegedly plotting to overthrow President Robert Mugabe.

== Biography ==
In 1982 Zimbabwean police arrested Masuku and Dumiso Dabengwa, the ZIPRA intelligence chief, for allegedly planning a coup d'état against then-Prime Minister Robert Mugabe. The Supreme Court found Masuku, Dabengwa, and four others not guilty in 1983, but police detained them again under emergency regulations, holding them for four years. The government released Masuku because of poor health and Vote Moyo, a ZAPU official, on 11 March 1986.

Masuku arrived in Rhodesia with Dumiso Dabengwa on 24 December 1979. Dabengwa had a meeting arranged with an informant from the country's Central Intelligence Organisation, but could not attend so sent Masuku in his stead. They judged this meeting very important, as the informant claimed that a few weeks earlier that Josiah Tongogara was killed in an ambush in Mozambique. The meeting took place in the Wimpy Bar in Salisbury (Harare), organised by "The Senator", which was his codename.

He died on 5 April 1986 at Parirenyatwa Hospital in Harare from cryptococcal meningitis. SW Radio Africa expressed doubt about the official circumstances of Masuku's death, saying it was "suspicious."

== Legacy ==
The Mugabe government later declared Masuku a national hero.

On 18 November 2017, the Government of Zimbabwe decided to honor some of the nation's prominent Liberation War Heroes by renaming some of the country's military barracks after them. Llewellin Barracks, situated on the outskirts of the city of Bulawayo, was renamed Lookout Masuku Barracks for the late ZIPRA Commander.
