= Rutenga =

Human settlement in Masvingo, Zimbabwe

Coordinates: 21°15′S 30°44′E

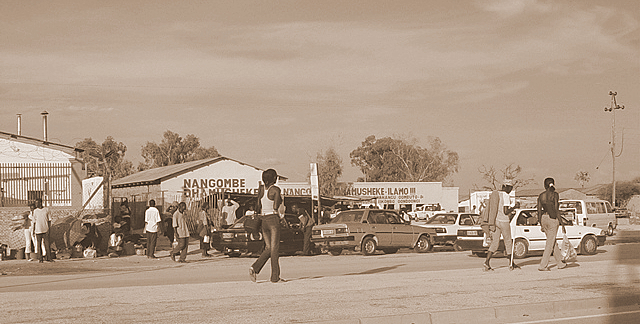
Rutenga in 2006

Rutenga is an important village in Masvingo Province in Zimbabwe. It is the de facto capital of Mwenezi District.

== Transport ==
It straddles the A4 highway between Beitbridge and Masvingo.

The village has a railway station on the Limpopo railway that connects it to Sango and Zvishavane. The same station serves as a link between the Limpopo railway and the Rutenga-Beitbridge railway.

== Economy ==
It is an important point of economic and demographic growth for southwest Zimbabwe.

Rutenga is an irrigation enclave that uses water from Manyuchi Dam to irrigate sugar estates.
