= Chiredzi River =

River in southeastern Zimbabwe

Coordinates: 21°11′33″S 31°51′44″E

The Save River basin with the Chiredzi (center bottom)

The Chiredzi River is a river in southeastern Zimbabwe. It is a tributary of the Runde River, and is dammed at Manjirenji Dam, which is recognised as an important wetland.

== See also ==
- Chiredzi
- Chiredzi District
