= Neshuro =

Coordinates: 20°57′S 30°39′E

Neshuro is an administrative centre for Mwenezi District in Masvingo Province, south-eastern Zimbabwe. It also acts as one of the largest business centres in the drought-prone district. It is the staging front base from which aid organisations like CARE International, Oxfam launch their humanitarian actives across the district.
