= Chiredzi F.C. =

Zimbabwean football club

Chiredzi
- Full name: Chiredzi Football Club
- Chairman: Tarisai Mudambanuki
- League: Zimbabwe Premier Soccer League

Chiredzi Football Club is a Zimbabwean football club based in Chiredzi. They played in the top division of Zimbabwean football, the Zimbabwe Premier Soccer League, in 2014.
