= Manyuchi Dam =

Lake Manyuchi
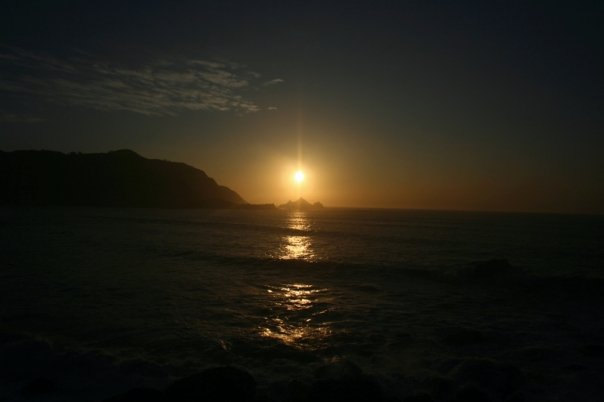
- Sunrise and dawn looking east

- Location within Zimbabwe
- Location: Mwenezi, Masvingo
- Coordinates: 21.054°S 30.370°E
- Type: Reservoir
- Primary inflows: Mwenezi River, Manyoshi, Mtedzi, Mhondi, Makugwe, Sovoleli, Malole, Mwele,
- Primary outflows: Mwenezi River
- Catchment area: Lowveld, Zvishavane, Mberengwa
- Basin countries: Zimbabwe
- Surface area: 33 km^{2} (13 sq mi)
- Max. depth: 25 m (82 ft)
- Water volume: 303,473 ML (10,717.0×10^{6} cu ft)
- Surface elevation: 600 m (2,000 ft)
- Islands: 17

Manyuchi Dam forms a reservoir on the Mwenezi River in southern Zimbabwe. It is located in the Mwenezi District. The building of the dam was financed by the Mwenezi Development Corporation. The dam was built to irrigate oil palm estates.

== History ==
The dam was built by International Construction Zimbabwe (ICZ), a division of the southern African construction giant Murray and Roberts, and was completed in 1988. The dam is located in the Mwenwezi River Valley in the middle section of the river. The area is flat and dry and semi-arid with countless dome-shaped mountains and kopjes in which troops of baboons roam at will. When it was built, a number of villages where displaced and forced to relocate by the government to distant places like the area between Ngundu and Chiredzi (District), where they suddenly found themselves labelled illegal settlers by local officials.

== Physical characteristics ==
The dam was built in a gorge that the Mwenezi River makes when passing through the mountains close to the village of Magomana. The area is dominated by mountains and kopjes. It is an arch dam with a gross head that stands at 25 m in height. The water level in the dam reached the spillway crest for the first in 1996.

== Ecology ==
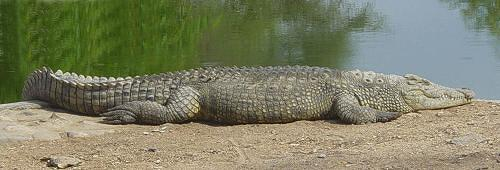
A Nile crocodile lounging in the sun on the edge of the dam

The river once boasted of hippos, but now they are gone. Instead the dam is riven with crocodiles. Nile crocodiles have killed a number of villagers fishing in the dam. There are several species of fish found in the dam, mostly in the family of tigerfish found in Lake Kariba. The dam's lifespan is under threat from the upstream dwellers, especially those in Mataga and districts in Zvishavane who till in the catchment of the dam producing silt.

== Uses ==
=== Electricity Generation ===
Zimbabwe Electricity Supply Authority (ZESA) has long had plans to generate electricity from the dam but nothing has come of it due to a shortage of funding. Studies show, however, that the water availability should make it possible to drive two 350-kilowatt turbines 6 000 hours per year, so as to generate 4.2 gigawatthours per year.

=== Irrigation ===
The Manyuchi dam in Zimbabwe was designed to irrigate an agroindustrial complex (2,000 hectares of sugar cane), 40 km downstream from the dam. The dam is to be used primarily to meet irrigation needs. The local population have tried to start irrigation projects using the water from the dam, but lack of funding has derailed their efforts, especially those in the nearby Magomana village. It was built to provide water for irrigation for both the commercial and rural irrigation schemes. To date, only the commercial farmers have benefited. None of the 3,476 hectares which were to have been irrigated for the small farmers has been developed. In 1995, at the height of a severe drought in the district and nationally, the dam was over 80 percent full and benefiting only a few large scale commercial farmers.

Lately there has been talk of Lapache Irrigation Scheme, a project funded by both the government, Triangle Sugar Ltd and a consortium of non-governmental organizations. The scheme represents the first major step towards the utilization of water from the dam to benefit local communities. Beneficiaries shall mainly be resettled farmers on the Lapache Farm.

=== Recreation ===
Previously tourists would go to the area for fishing and other activities. But these days, it is difficult to get there, the roads have been washed away, and one would need a four-wheel drive vehicle to access it.

== In popular culture ==
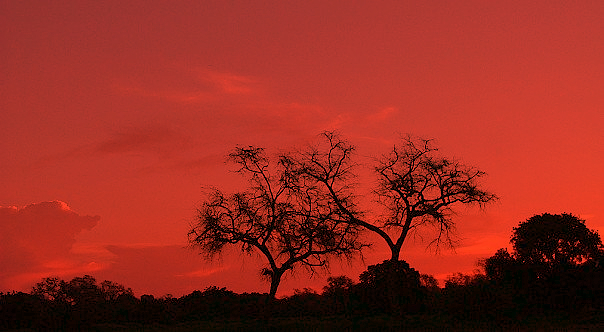
Dusk gathering fast on the dam, view of land from an island, 2006

The dam features in local folklore.

== See also ==
- Masvingo
- Beitbridge
- Maranda
- Mwenezi (District)

== Image gallery ==
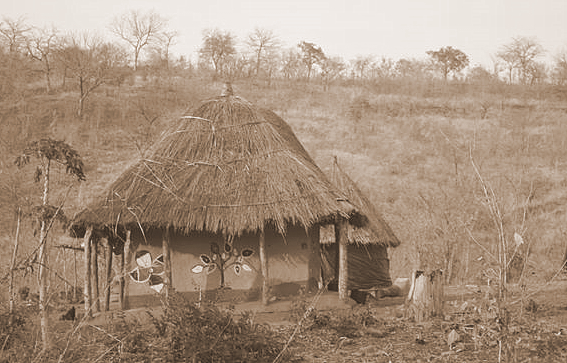
Typical village homestead in communities that live on the edge of the dam

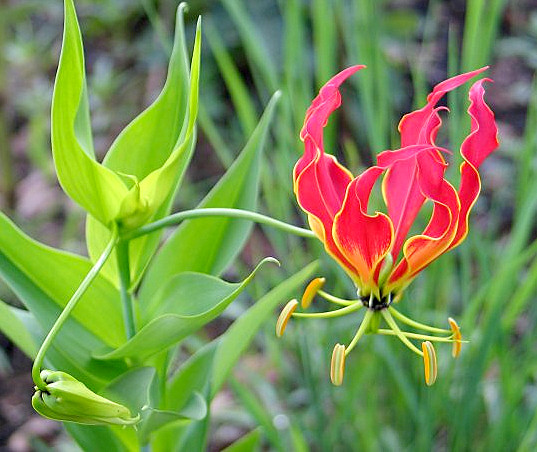
The national flower along the edges of the dam.

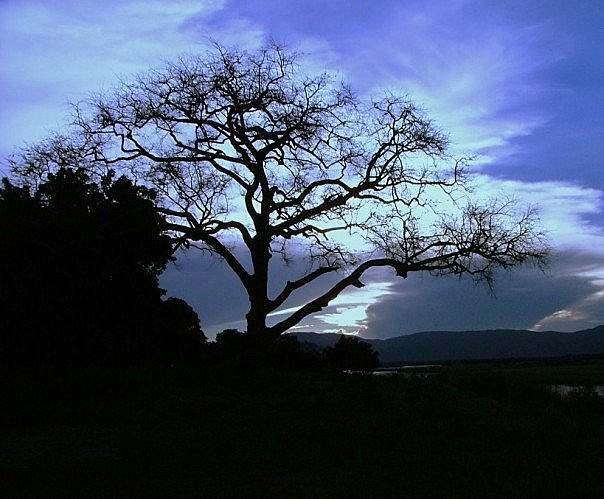
View around the dam

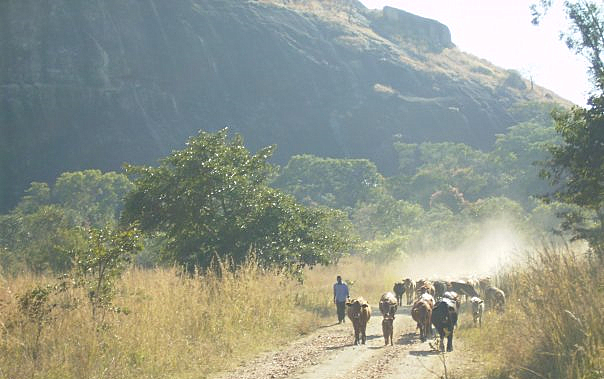
Cattle herding Duty for a boy from nearby Magomana village
