= Chiredzi =

Chiredzi north
- Town
- Coat of arms

- Location within Zimbabwe
- Coordinates: 21°02′20″S 31°40′40″E
- Country: Zimbabwe
- Province: Masvingo
- District: Chiredzi
- Established: late 1950s. 1st July 1967 Rural Council established.
- Elevation: 438 m (1,437 ft)

Population (2022 census)
  - Total: 40,100
- Time zone: UTC+2 (CAT)
- Area code: 031
- Climate: BSh
- Website: www.chiredzi.co.zw

Chiredzi is a town in Masvingo province in south-east Zimbabwe. It is located near the Runde River, which has a tributary called the 'Chiredzi'. As the administrative center for Chiredzi District, it is where both the rural and district councils are based.

== Infrastructure ==
- Chiredzi is served by a small international airport at Buffalo Range called "Buffalo Range Airport," or "BFO."
- The non-profit organization, Elias Fund, has its Zimbabwean base of operations in Chiredzi. The Mashoko / Hippo Valley Christian Mission also had headquarters in Chiredzi, from which it oversees two orphanages and a number of schools and churches throughout the province.
- The Hippo Valley Estates is located here, with its A-school and private school, that is Hippo Valley Primary school. South Eastern College is also located in Chiredzi, and serves as the only A-rated private high school in the area.
- Hippo Valley Hospital is one of a number of centers for the treatment of HIV or AIDS in the province.

== Population ==
The census of 2002 recorded the population of the town at 26,129.

== Wildlife ==
Chiredzi has Gonarezhou National Park with Malilangwe. The two places have been visited by celebrities and support tourism. They enclose the wildlife consisting of carnivorous, herbivorous and omnivorous animals, such as the red-billed quelea and Zimbabwean cheetah.

== See also ==
- Chiredzi F.C.
- Masvingo Province
