= Chiredzi District =

Chiredzi District Chiredzi
- District
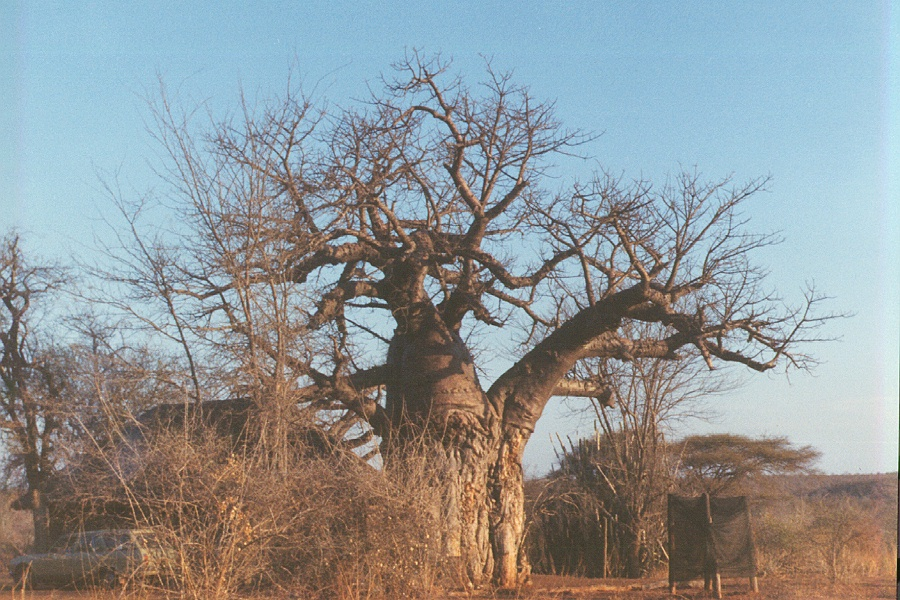
- A baobab tree in Gonarezhou national park, which is found in the district

- Chiredzi District within Zimbabwe
- Coordinates: 18°55′S 29°49′E
- Country: Zimbabwe
- Province: Masvingo
- District: Chiredzi
- Established: late 19th century

Population (2022 Census)
  - Total: 303,503
- Time zone: UTC+1 (CET)
  - Summer (DST): UTC+1 (CEST)

A district in Zimbabwe, Masvingo Province

Chiredzi found in the district, is one of a number of centers for HIV/AIDS treatment in the province. The district's Hippo Valley Hospital is one of a number of centers for HIV/AIDS treatment in the province. The district is famous for hosting Hippo Valley Estate and the nearby Mkwasine Estate, both of which specialize in sugar cane and citrus fruit production.

== Geography ==
A large chunk of the district is found in region V, although there are some parts that lie in region IV. Areas in region five are characterized by aridity and uncertain rainfall patterns. Many parts of the district are unfit for agriculture, hence in 1972 they set aside to form Gonarezhou National Park. In terms of surface area, Chiredzi is one of the largest districts in the country with over 95% of its area taken up by Gonarenzou and other conservancies like Malilangwe. With the arid climate, most people grow sorghum, a crop which is drought-tolerant and requires minimal rain to grow to maturity. The red soil found in the district is also suitable for sugarcane, and prior to the land invasions of 2000, the district was a center for sugar production for the whole country.

== Population ==
The district is sparsely populated. The Tsonga people are in the majority, and the predominant language is Xitsonga,.

== Government and politics ==
For the general elections of 2008, Chiredzi District has been divided into four sectors. Candidates from the MDC-T, MDC-M, ZANU-PF and independents would have competed for the four constituency seats available, and the winners would have represented the district in Zimbabwe's new House of Assembly. For the Chiredzi East Sector, Mafamu Dennis (PAFA), Sithole Abraham (Zanu-PF), Chingombe Samson (MDC Mtambara), Chiromo Walter (MDC Tsvangirai) were registered to contest the seat, while Tafamba Olivia (PAFA), Ndava Ronald (Zanu-PF), and Mutambu John (MDC Tsvangirai) would have contested Chiredzi North. Baloyi Alois (Zanu-PF), Zanamwe Nehemiah (MDC), Chirove Joseph (MDC Tsvangirai) vied for Chiredzi South, while Musareva Ernest (PAFA), Samson Aliginia (Zanu-PF), Mungwadzi Godfrey (Independent), Mashiri Robson (MDC Mutambara), and nickrd would have fought it out for Chiredzi West.

== See also ==
- Chiredzi River
- Gonarenzou National Park
