= Sinamatella Camp =

Rest camp in Hwange National Park, Zimbabwe

Sinamatella
- Interactive map of Sinamatella
- Location: Northern wild area, south of Hwange town and colliery, Hwange National Park
- Coordinates: 18.585807°S 26.315301°E
- Campsites: tent or caravan sites
- Residences: lodges (bungalows)
- Operated by: Zimbabwe Parks and Wildlife Management Authority
- Website: https://www.zimparks.org.zw/hwange-national-park/

Sinamatella Camp is a rest camp and area management headquarters in Hwange National Park. It is situated ontop of ridge, overlooking a river valley and forests.

The Sinamatella area has rocky hills, covered by mopane woodland, with grassy riverine habitats including dambos and ephemeral streams in the valleys between. Sinamatella was declared an Intensive Protection Zone for black rhino in 1994.

== History ==
Prior to the proclamation of the Wankie Game Reserve (later Hwange National Park), the Sinamatella area was a livestock farm of the same name, established in the 1920s, before it was formally acquired for the game reserve in the 1930s. The name is a corruption of the Nambya word namatila, referring to a bush with sticky thorns. The areas around Sinamatella that were formerly grazed continue to experience erosion problems, especially in mopane woodland around the edges of the hills.

== Camp Facilities ==
Brick-built accommodation units were built in the 1960s and 1970s. These units were taken over by a mining company that briefly commenced trial mining in the neighbouring Deka Safari Area in 2021. Some of these units have been subsequently refurbished and reopened to the public.

Tented camping sites are also available.

The Bhejane Trust, a non-governmental organization that assists with game water supply and maintenance in northern Hwange, as well as Kazuma Pan and Zambezi National Parks, has its headquarters at Sinamatella.

== Activities ==
The main activities from Sinamatella are self drive game-viewing, with access to hides at Masuma Dam and Shumba Pan. The area also has waterfowl viewing locations such as Mandavu Dam and Nichenge Salt Springs.
