= Shapi Pan =

Zimbabwean geographical site

- Shapi Pan during the rainy season
- Interactive map of Shapi Pan
- Location: Between Main Camp and Sinamatella, Hwange National Park, Zimbabwe
- Coordinates: 18.864800°S 26.587488°E
- Type: Watering hole

Shapi Pan is a waterhole or pan in Hwange National Park.

The pan is an important source of water for mammals and birds in the area, especially elephants and kudu, as well as predators such as lions.

At the time of the proclamation of Hwange as a game reserve, Shapi Pan was the furthest point reachable into the interior of the park from the headquarters at Main Camp. A ranger station, and later management unit base, were subsequently established near the pan,

In late 1967, South African Police Allouette III helicopters were stationed at Shapi during the Wankie Battles, seeking to engage Umkhonto we Sizwe (MK) fighters.

In 1972 the Shapi ranger station was the site of one of the few maneating lion attacks on humans in Zimbabwe, and a park warden was killed. The ranger station was closed and the management unit base moved closer to Main Camp after this tragedy.
