= Darwendale Recreational Park =

Protected area in Zimbabwe

- IUCN category V (protected landscape/seascape)
- Interactive map of Darwendale Recreational Park
- Location: Zvimba District, Zimbabwe
- Nearest city: Harare
- Coordinates: 17°49′6″S 30°30′18″E
- Area: 11,200 ha (28,000 acres)
- Established: 1975
- Governing body: Zimbabwe Parks and Wildlife Management Authority

Ramsar Wetland
- Designated: January 3, 2013

Darwendale Recreational Park is a protected area around Lake Manyame within the Zimbabwe Parks and Wildlife Estate.

Lake Manyame (formerly Lake Robertson) is on the Manyame River downstream of Lake Chivero, a water supply dam for Harare, and is inhabited by crocodiles and hippos, and is an Important Bird Area, notably for the high population of African fish eagles, as well as numerous waterfowl including ducks, geese, waders, gulls, cormorants, darters, herons, storks and ibises.

== Tourism ==
The park is an angling venue for species such as bass, Mozambique tilapia, and Hunyani salmon, and the shoreline has beach activities and water sports.

Self-catering lodges (bungalows) and tent or caravan sites are available for guests.
