= Main Camp =

Rest camp in Hwange National Park, Zimbabwe

- Interactive map of Main Camp
- Location: Eastern wild area, southeast of Dete, Hwange National Park
- Coordinates: 18.730653°S 26.951275°E
- Campsites: tent or caravan sites
- Residences: chalets (huts); lodges (bungalows)
- Restaurants: Waterbuck' Head
- Facilities: Petrol station
- Operated by: Zimbabwe Parks and Wildlife Management Authority
- Website: https://www.zimparks.org.zw/hwange-national-park/

Main Camp is Hwange National Park's largest rest camp and headquarters of the park, receiving around 80% of the park's visitors. It is situated on the Main Camp Vlei in the eastern section of the park.

== History ==
Prior to the proclamation of the Wankie Game Reserve (later Hwange National Park), the main camp area was a remote livestock farm and lime quarry, named Balcarres, established after the construction of the Bulawayo‐Victoria Falls railway. It was formally acquired for the game reserve in 1931, and established as the park headquarters, and has remained the park headquarters since then.

== Camp Facilities ==
Primitive overnight facilities at Main Camp established in the 1950s and were replaced by brick huts in the 1960s and 1970s. These units remain in use today, and many were refurbished in the early 2020s.

Tented camping and caravan sites are also available.

Main camp also has research facilities including a herbarium and laboratory.

== Activities ==
The main activities from Main Camp are game-viewing, either self drive or in game viewer vehicles, with access to elevated platform hides, such as at Nyamandlovu Pan, Guvalala Pan, and Makwa Pan.

The annual Zimbabwe Safari Rally has staged at Main camp since 2021.
