= Lake Chivero Recreational Park =

Protected area in Zimbabwe

- IUCN category V (protected landscape/seascape)
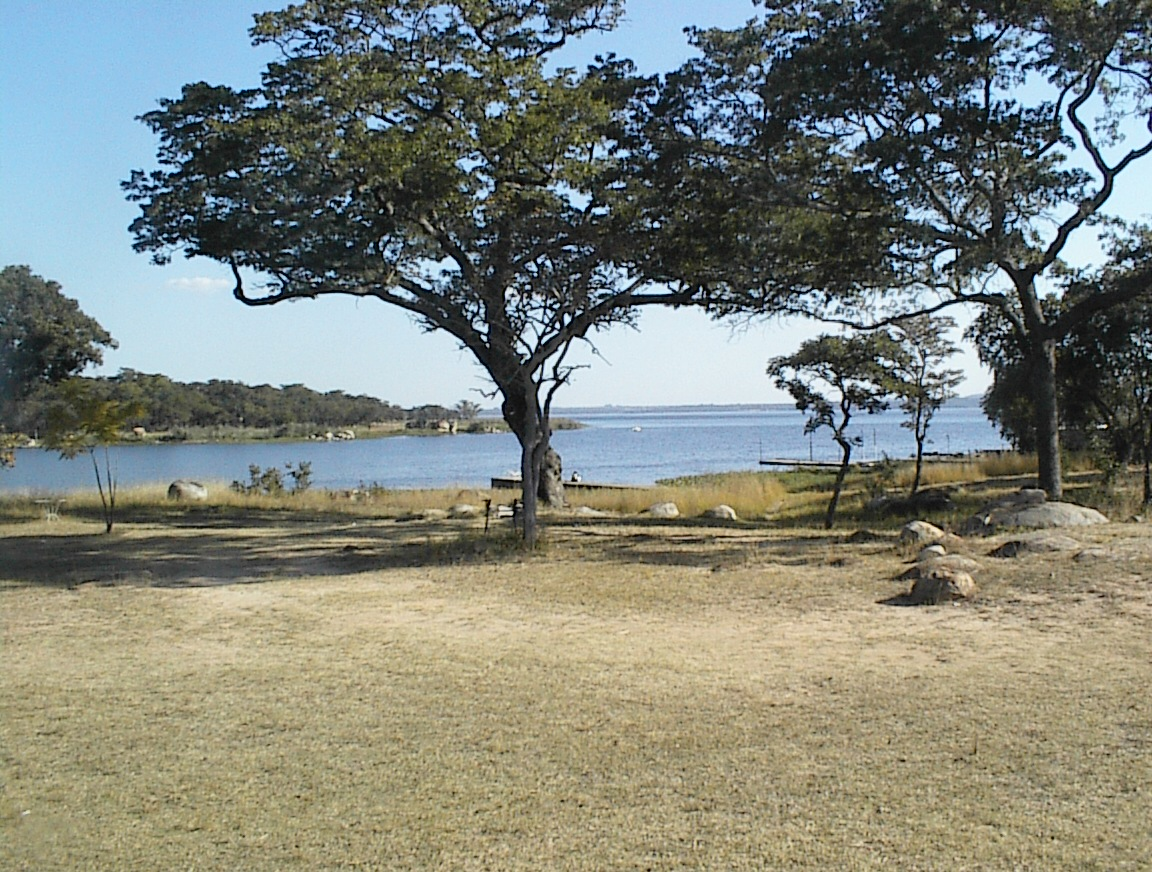
- North bank of Lake Chivero
- Interactive map of Lake Chivero Recreational Park
- Location: Zvimba District, Zimbabwe
- Nearest city: Harare
- Coordinates: 17°54′42″S 30°47′15″E
- Area: 6,100 ha (15,000 acres)
- Established: 1952
- Governing body: Zimbabwe Parks and Wildlife Management Authority

Ramsar Wetland
- Designated: January 3, 2013

Lake Chivero Recreational Park is a protected area around Lake Chivero within the Zimbabwe Parks and Wildlife Estate.

== History of the park ==
The park was proclaimed as a national park in 1952, and changed to its current status in 1975.

== Features ==
=== Flora ===
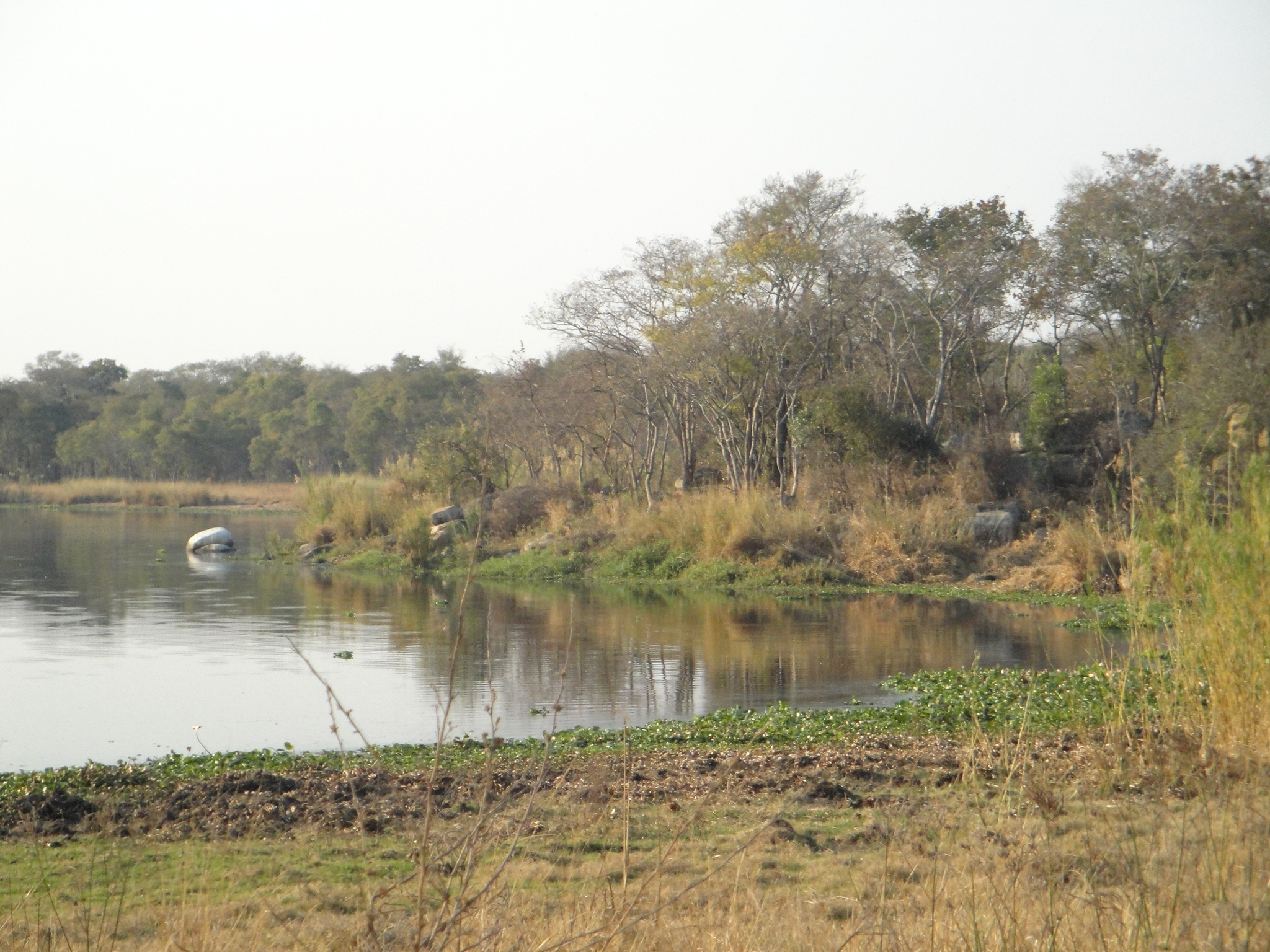
Miombo woodland bordering Lake Chivero

Typical of high veld vegetation, the park is dominated by Brachystegia/ miombo woodland. Brachystegia and Julbernardia globiflora with associated trees such as Terminalia sericea, Parinari curatellifolia and Monotes glaber creating enough food for browsers.

=== Fauna ===
The animals that are easily sighted in the park are southern white rhino, Angolan giraffe, Burchell's zebra, blue wildebeest, impala, kudu, waterbuck, tsessebe, common eland, sable, baboon, monkey, duiker, warthog, bush pig, rock hyrax, scrub hare, spring hare, bush squirrel.

The park also has a variety of nocturnals that include civet, genet, black-backed jackal, porcupine, slender white tailed mongoose, caracal, pangolin, aardvark, serval, bush baby, night ape and several other species.

Included amongst the several bird species are: South African ostrich, African openbills, barbets, bee-eaters, buzzards, coots, cormorants, doves, hamerkops, jacanas, kingfishers, grey herons, darters, Goliath herons, fish eagles, glossy starlings and lilac-breasted rollers.

=== Geography and geology ===
The western boundary of the park is the Manyame Range, a line of ironstone hills in which the dam was built. The remainder of the park is rolling granite countryside, with numerous castle koppies.

=== Archaeological, historical and cultural sites ===
There are several rock painting sites in the park, including one at Bushman's Point, which is readily accessible from a short walk.

== Accommodation and camping ==
=== South Bank (game park) ===
Facilities at Lake Chivero include lodges, chalets, caravan and picnic sites. Lake Chivero is electrified and the water is drawn from a borehole. Ail lodges and chalets are fitted with outside lighting and clean water at ail units. Lodges are self-catering units that contain bedroom units, lounge and a kitchen. Cutlery and crockery are provided. Presently lodges are only available at the South bank. There are two standard lodges, Sunbird and Stonechat lodges. These are two bed-roomed units. There are 3 exclusive lodges, one located near the tourist office and the other two 1.5 km from the tourist office. Hornbill, the lodge at the tourist office is a two bed-roomed facility. Fish Eagle and Kingfisher lodges are located on a hill 1.5 km from the tourist office. The lodges have a unique view overlooking the plain and lake below. The lodges each have two bedrooms.

There are two types of chalets. Ail chalets have external communal ablution (toilet) blocks. The single chalets are one bed-roomed facilities with a small sitting area. The next level of chalets, are the three roomed ones that boast of two bedrooms, a lounge and a kitchen.

=== North Bank ===
The Msasa caravan and camping site is situated at the North Bank which is about 29 km from Harare using a separate entrance. The facilities offer braai stands and an ablution block that includes showers both cold and hot water, firewood is also supplied at the spot.

== Tourism ==
=== Access ===
The park is accessed from the Harare-Bulawayo road.

=== Game viewing ===
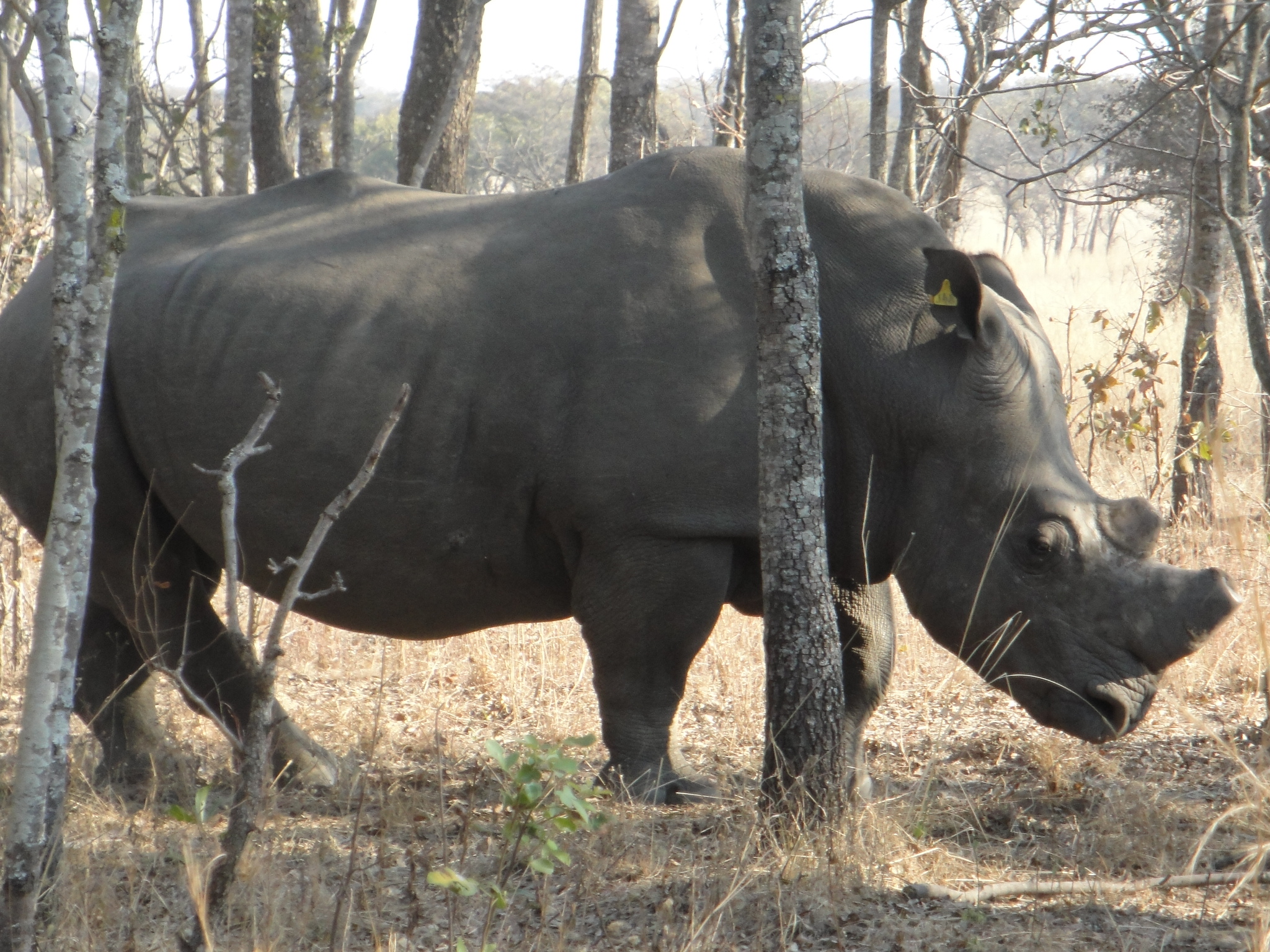
White rhino in the game park

The game park which opened in 1962 occupies around 1 867 hectares which hold a variety of game; most of which was introduced at that time from the Hwange National Park (then Wankie game reserve). Some of the game was brought in from Lake Kariba during the game rescue operation better known as "Operation Noah".

=== Hiking ===
Game walks are conducted at the tourist's chosen time but they must be booked a day before. A guide takes tourists for a walk for at least an hour but no more than five hours a day per group, unless it is an educational tour. Prior arrangement is required.

=== Horse riding ===
Horse riding is conducted every day except Mondays, which are dipping days. There are two rides which take place per day, one at 0800hrs to 0930hrs and the other at 1530hrs to 1700hrs. each ride is 11/2 hours long, ail rides are conducted under the guidance of the parks personnel. Horse rides can not be done when it is raining or promising to rain. Charges for the rides and any details on extra rides can be obtained from the tourist office.

=== Fishing ===
The main and most sought out activity at the park is fishing, which takes place all year round. There are five fishing and picnic sites.

=== Boating ===
Recreational boating is permitted on the lake and there are many private boat hire companies.

== See also ==
- Lake Chivero
- Manyame River
