= Mandavu Dam =

Dam in Hwange National Park, Zimbabwe

- Mandavu Dam, from the picnic site
- Interactive map of Mandavu Dam
- Location: Hwange National Park, Zimbabwe
- Coordinates: 18.642852°S 26.273691°E

Dam and spillways
- Impounds: Mandawi river

Mandavu Dam is a gravity dam located in the in the Sinamatella area of Hwange National Park, on the main road south of Sinamatella. The dam is used for water supply for wildlife.

The dam is inhabited by hippos and waterfowl such as knob-billed duck. It is a source of water for mammals and birds in the area, especially elephants, buffalo, impala, and zebra. In 1962 and 1963, Mandavu was the site for the release of black rhino relocated from the rising waters of the new Lake Kariba in Operation Noah.

Tourist facilities are established on the lakeshore, including a view point, picnic site for day visitors, and overnight camping site.
