= Hwali =

Coordinates: 21.694505°S 29.202979°E

Hwali Nhwali
- Village
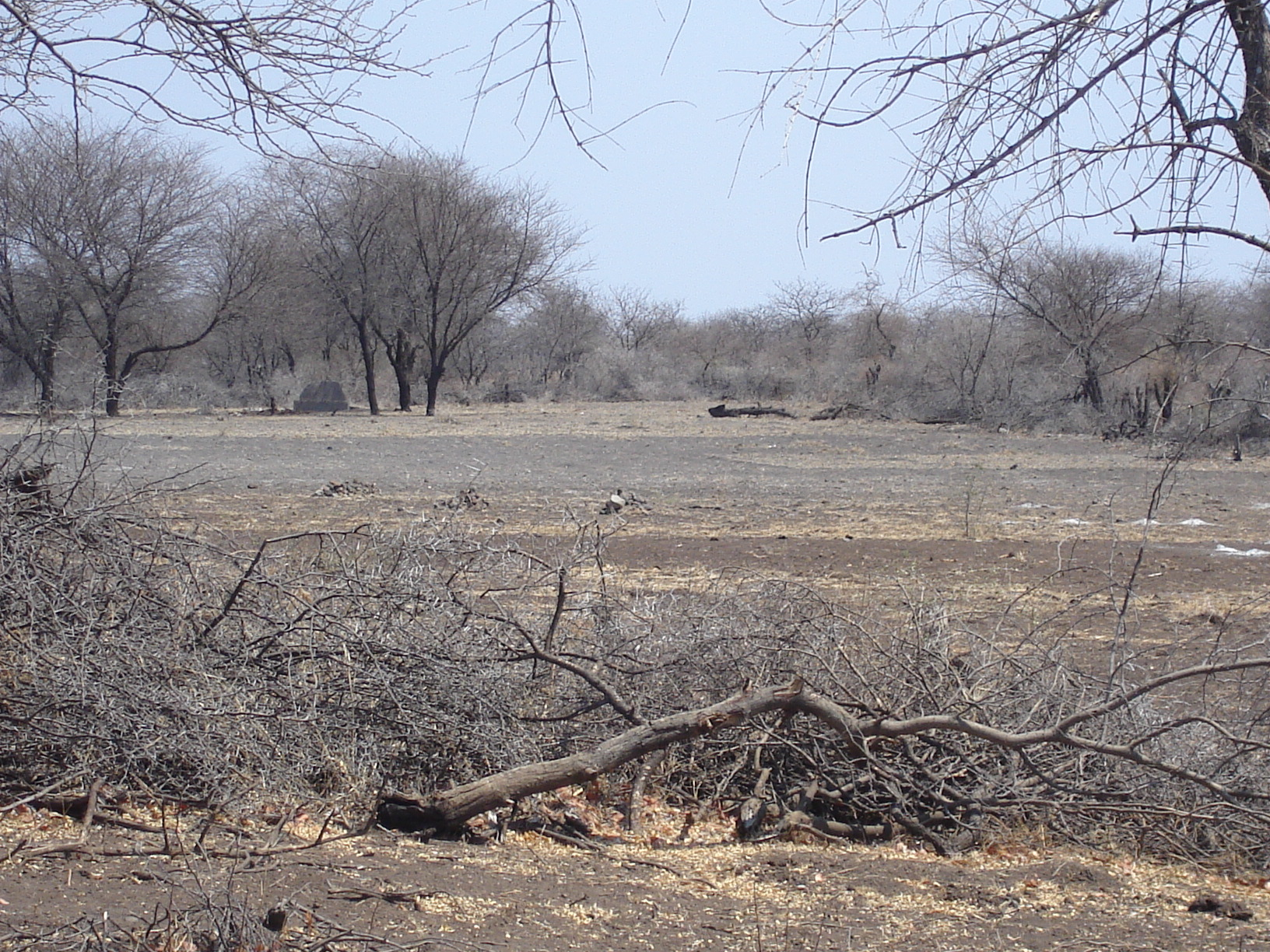
- Farmland at the end of the dry season, Hwali south
- Interactive map of Hwali
- Country: Zimbabwe
- Province: Matabeleland South
- District: Gwanda District
- Time zone: UTC+2 (Central Africa Time)

Location of Hwali

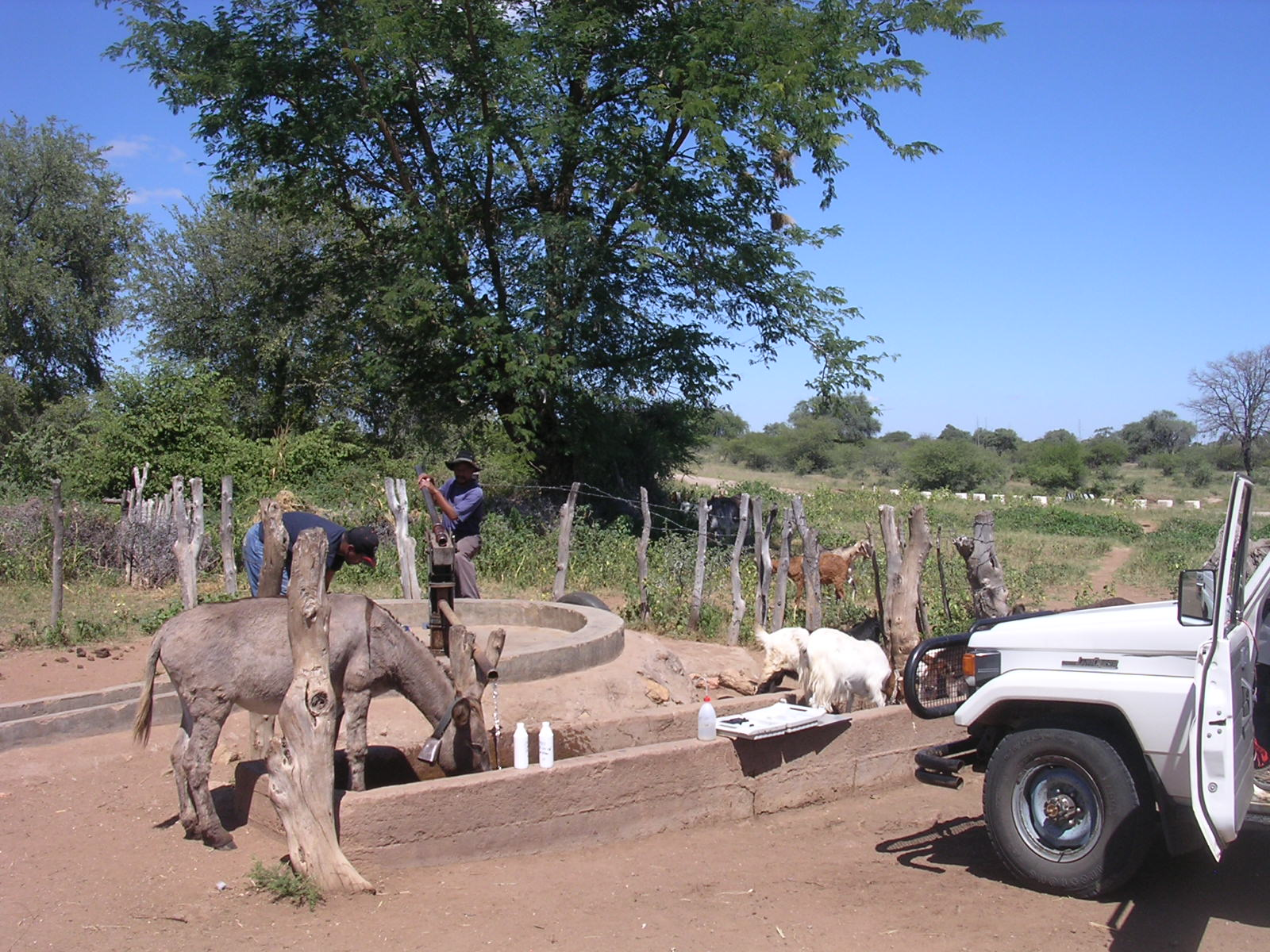
Rural scene near Hwali.

Hwali, sometimes referred to as Nhwali, is a village in Gwanda District in the province of Matabeleland South, Zimbabwe.

It is located south-east of Gwanda, approximately 111 km from Gwanda on the road to Tuli.

Hwali is the centre of the Hwali Wildlife Management Area, part of the Greater Mapungubwe Transfrontier Conservation Area.
