= Nyamandlovu Pan =

Zimbabwean geographical site

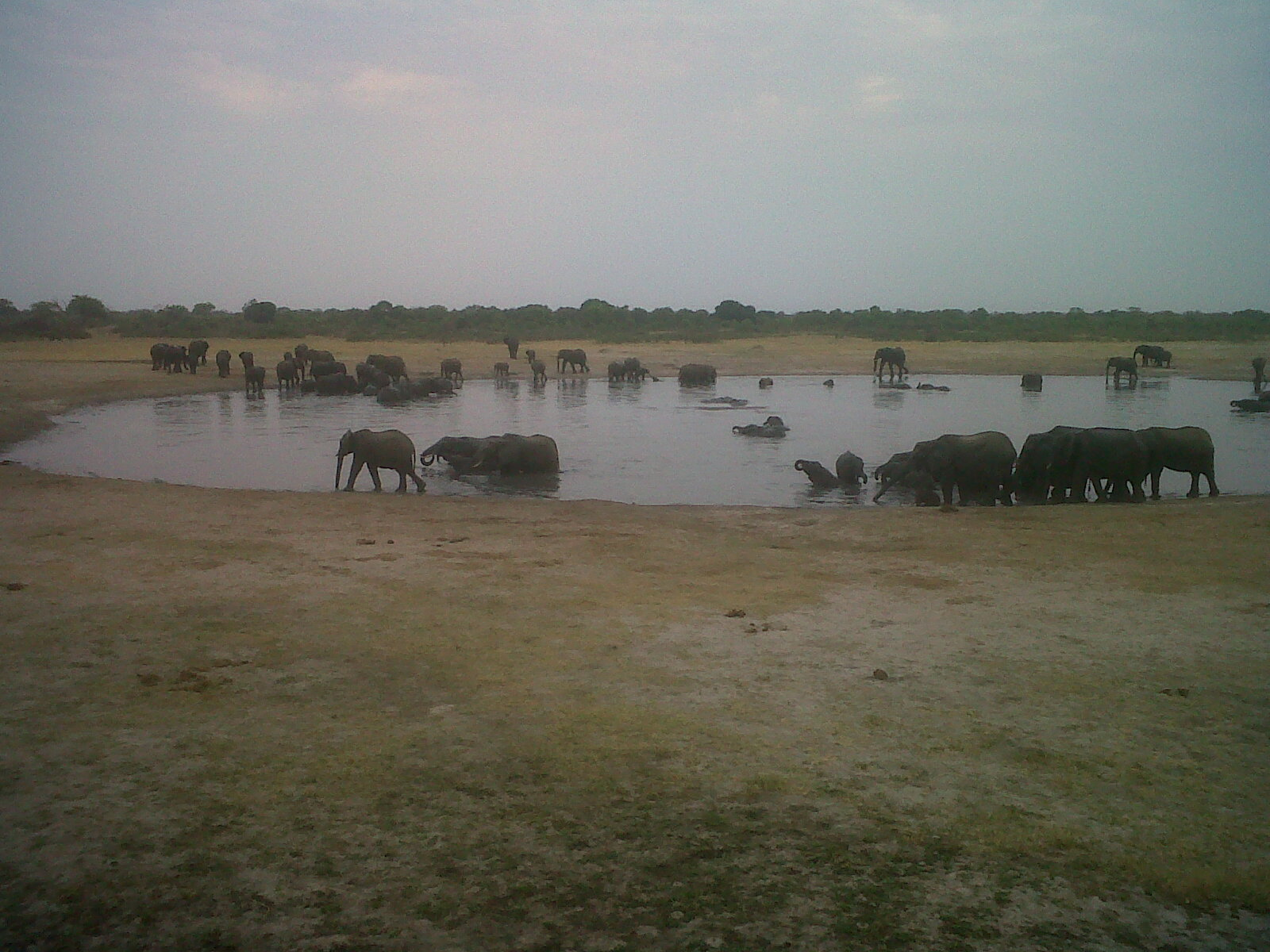
- Elephants at Nyamandlovu Pan
- Interactive map of Nyamandlovu Pan
- Location: Main Camp area, Hwange National Park, Zimbabwe
- Coordinates: 18.78333°S 26.88333°E
- Type: Watering hole
- Etymology: Meat of the elephant in Northern Ndebele
- Part of: Dom Vlei

Nyamandlovu Pan is a waterhole or pan in Hwange National Park, near Main Camp. It is the largest waterhole in the park, and a prominent tourist attrction.

The borehole supplying the pan is one of the highest yielding in the park, and the water is brackish with electroconductivity of 1.4 mS/cm.

The pan is inhabited by hippos and Nile crocodiles, and is an important source of water for mammals and birds in the area, especially elephants, impala, and zebra, as well as predators such as lions and a pack of painted dogs' home range is centred around the pan.

Tourists may view the pan from an elevated game-viewing hide, locally referred to as a platform, during daylight opening hours, and guided moonlight viewing at the full moon. The Nyamandlovu platform is the oldest in the park.
