= Tuli, Zimbabwe =

Coordinates: 21°55′S 029°12′E

Tuli
- Village
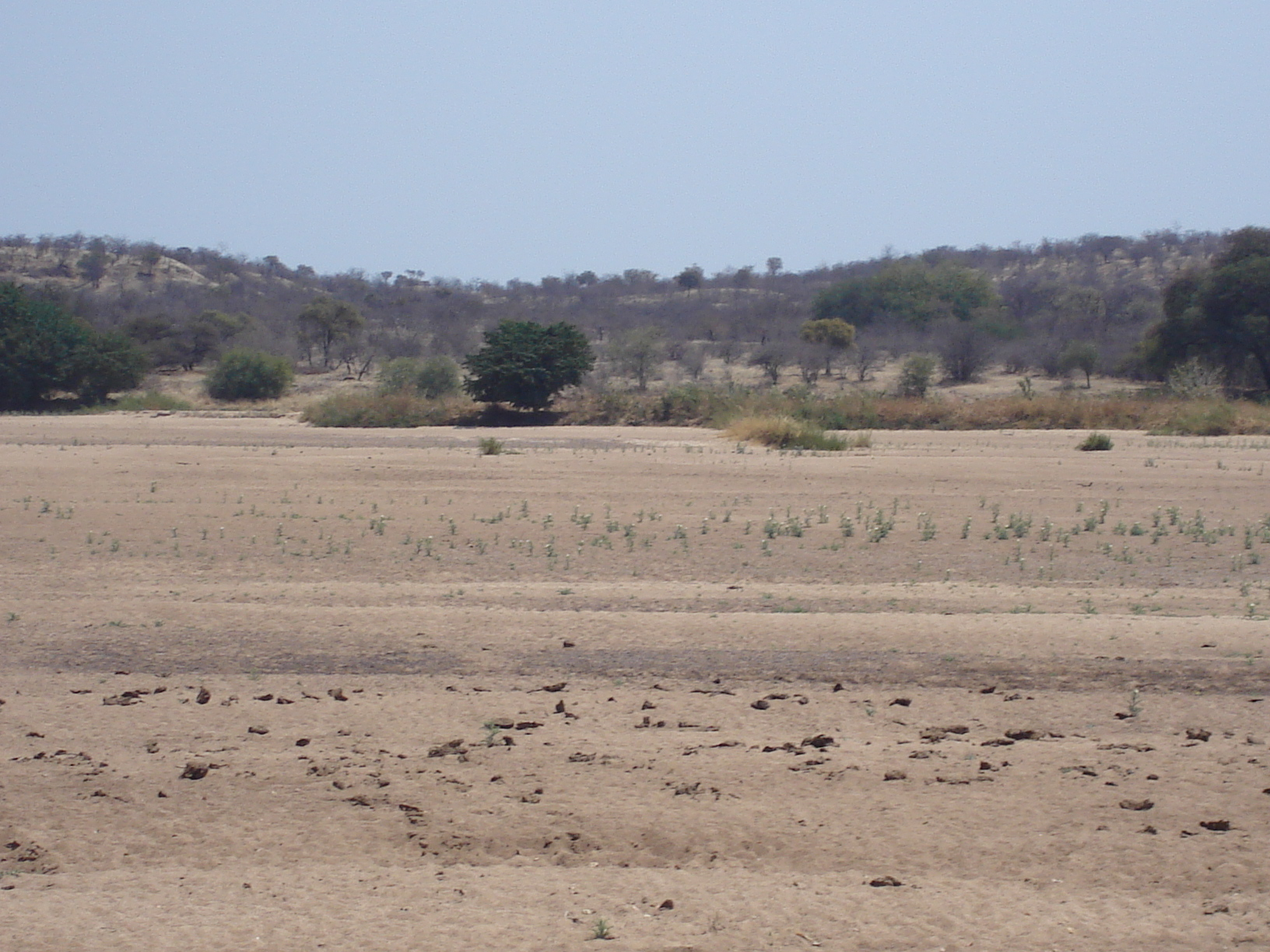
- Looking across the Shashe River near Tuli village, Zimbabwe
- Interactive map of Tuli
- Country: Zimbabwe
- Province: Matabeleland South
- District: Gwanda District
- Time zone: UTC+2 (Central Africa Time)

Location of Tuli

Tuli is a village in the province of Matabeleland South, in southwestern Zimbabwe. It is located about 90 km west of Beitbridge on the eastern bank of the Shashe River. The village grew around Fort Tuli, which was the first settlement built by the Pioneer Column in July 1890 at the place known as Selous Camp and used by Frederick Selous as a base for his hunting expeditions. The village is mainly a police post and associated housing.

The village can be accessed from Gwanda town via Guyu and Hwali, or from Beitbridge via Nottingham and Shashi Irrigation Scheme, although the latter road is in very poor condition.

== History ==
Tuli was the first point at which the pioneer column, and many subsequent expeditions entered into Matabeleland and onward north to Salisbury (now Harare), the capital of Rhodesia as the country was then known. Tuli was the first location north of the Limpopo/Shashe rivers where a 'European' style building was erected - the BSA Police Station was a wooden modular style Victorian building, brought from the UK and erected to house members of the BSA Police who monitored the river crossing just south of the building's location. Until this time a large Fort (Fort Tuli) had existed on the southern bank of the Shashe where oxen and horses were rested prior to undertaking the river crossing. In the 1970s this building was re-located from its original site and erected at the site of the old, and now obliterated, Fort Tuli. It was used to house artifacts and items of historic interest which were found by persons in the area of the old Fort.

Fort Tuli was also the launching point of the Jameson Raid into the South African Republic which contributed significantly to the start of the Second Boer War in the late 19th century.

== Tuli Circle ==
Tuli also forms the centre of a 10-mile (16 km) 'circle', the southern half of which stretches south of the Shashe River. This circle was established by the early pioneers with the agreement of local tribesmen as a no-go area for the grazing of local cattle. This preserved the grazing and helped to prevent the spread of rinderpest from the local cattle to the oxen needed for the trek north. The shape is incorporated in the international boundary between Zimbabwe and Botswana, which ceases to be the Shashe River for the section where it flows through this area and instead follows the outer rim of this circle. This is a protected area, now the Thuli Parks and Wildlife Land.
