= Lake Chivero =

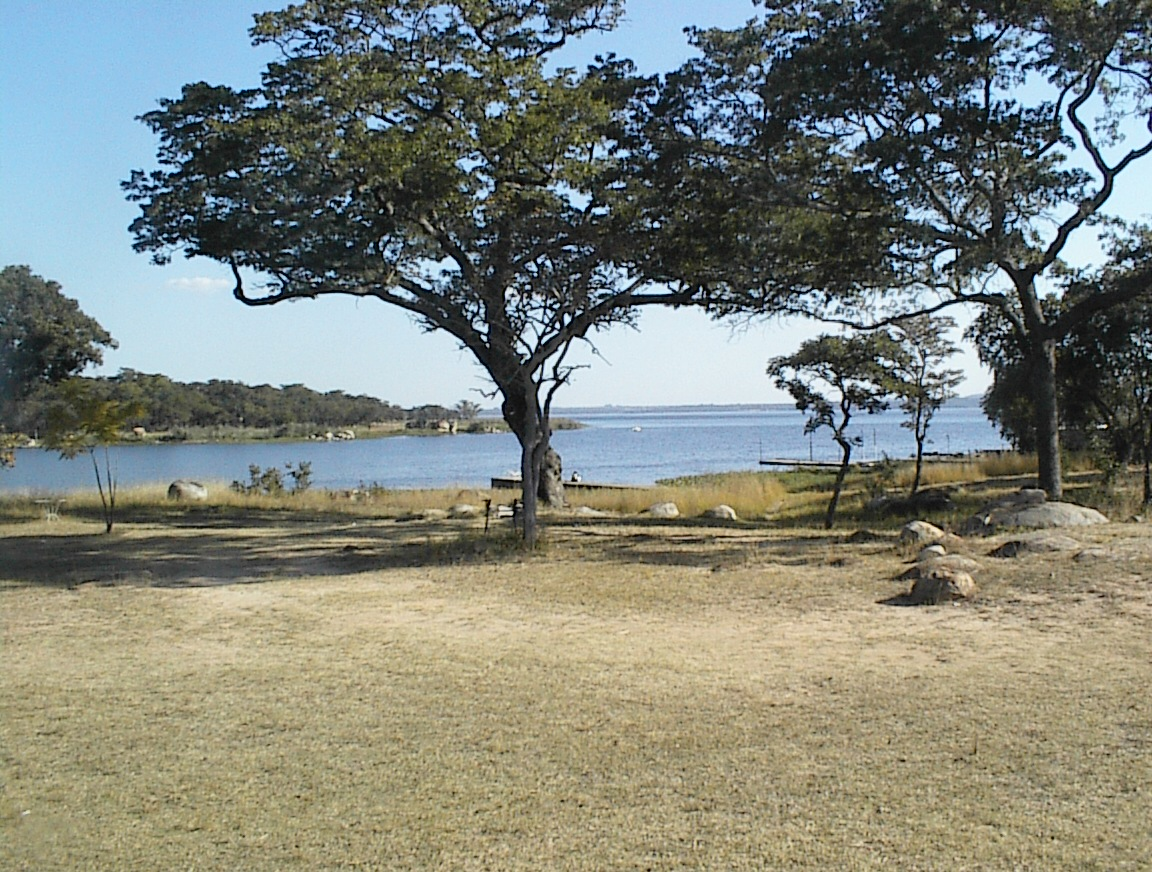
- viewed from the north bank

- Location within Zimbabwe Location within Africa
- Coordinates: 17°54′01″S 30°47′28″E
- Type: reservoir
- Primary inflows: Manyame River, Marimba River, Mukuvisi River
- Primary outflows: Manyame River
- Basin countries: Zimbabwe
- Max. width: 8 km (5.0 mi)
- Surface area: 2,632 ha (6,500 acres)
- Max. depth: 27 m (89 ft)
- Water volume: 250×10^{6} m^{3} (200,000 acre⋅ft)
- Shore length^{1}: 48 km (30 mi)

Ramsar Wetland
- Official name: Lake Chivero and Manyame
- Designated: 3 May 2013
- Reference no.: 2105
- ^{1} Shore length is not a well-defined measure.

Lake Chivero (formerly Lake McIlwaine) is a reservoir on the Manyame River in Zimbabwe.

Located southwest of Harare, it provides the main water supply for the city. The lake was constructed over two-and-a-half years and opened to the public in 1952. The dam wall is 400 metres long.

The water is also used for irrigation purposes and commercial fishing. Some of the fishes that are found in the lake include common grass carp, tigerfish, black bream, Clarias gariepinus, yellowfish, and green-headed bream.

The lake and hinterland are protected as part of Lake Chivero Recreational Park. The lake was designated a Ramsar wetland of international importance on 3 January 2013.

Remembrance Island is a small island in the reservoir.

== See also ==
- Lake Chivero Recreational Park
