= Tshakabika Hot Springs =

Zimbabwean geographical site

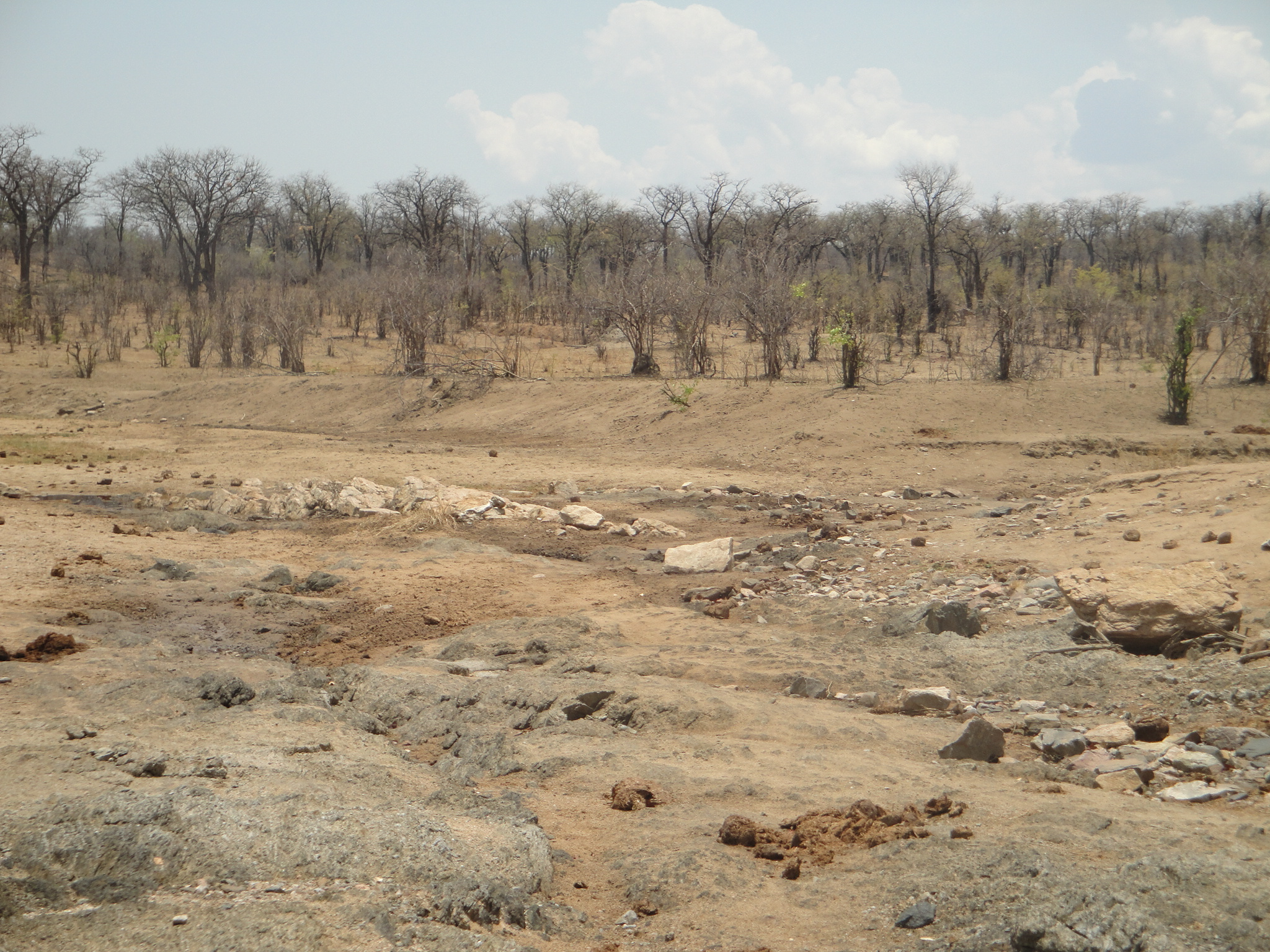
- Tshakabika Hot Springs in the dry season
- Interactive map of Tshakabika Hot Springs
- Location: Sinamatella area, Hwange National Park, Zimbabwe
- Coordinates: 18.616273°S 26.480099°E
- Type: Thermal spring
- Temperature: warm

Tshakabika Hot Springs are a group of thermal springs in the Sinamatella area of Hwange National Park, east of Sinamatella on the Mtoa road.

There are nine individual springs, where Triassic sediments of the Escarpment Grit are downthrown by a fault against Pre-Cambrian basement gneiss. Fluorite has been found at the springs.

The springs and river are a source of water for mammals and birds in the area, especially elephants, impala, and zebra, and a pack of painted dogs' home range is centred around the springs.

Accommodation at the site is available in the form of self-catering chalets and camping sites.
