= Hwange National Park =

Nature reserve in Zimbabwe

- IUCN category II (national park)
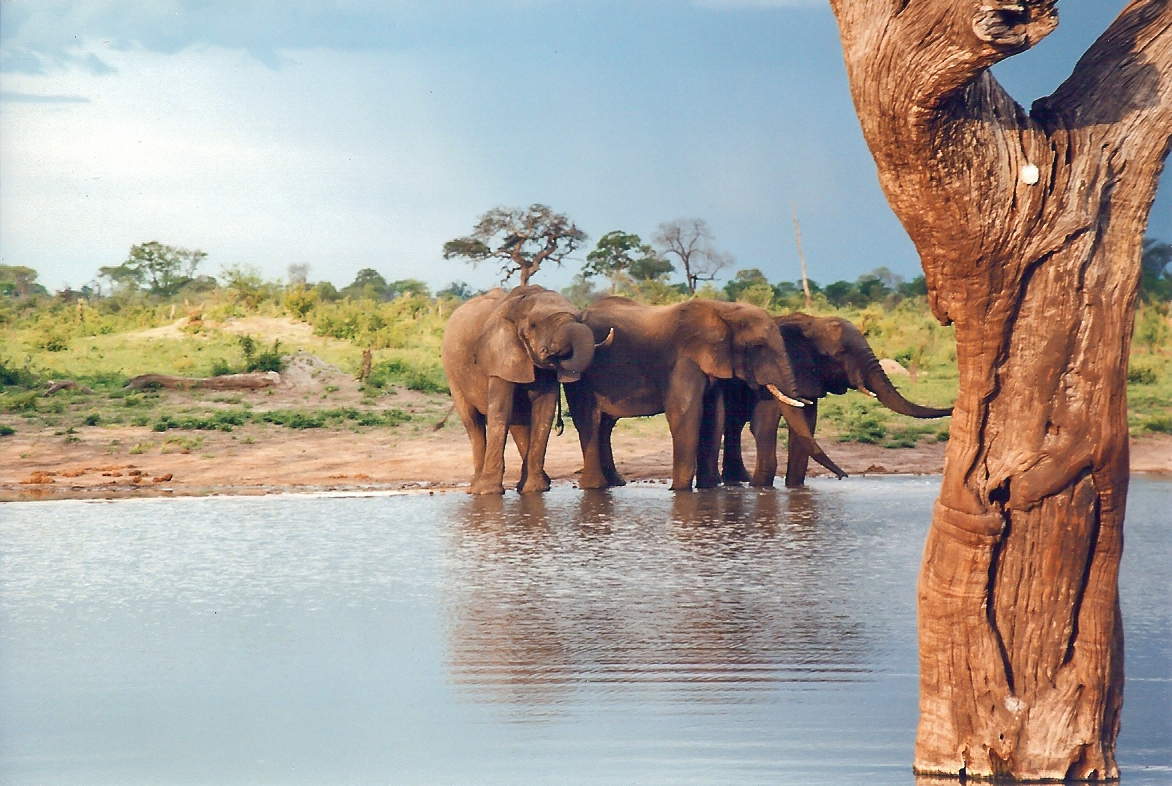
- African bush elephants in a waterhole of the park
- Interactive map of Hwange National Park
- Location: Matabeleland North, Zimbabwe
- Nearest city: Hwange
- Coordinates: 18°44′06″S 26°57′18″E
- Area: 14,651 km^{2} (5,657 sq mi)
- Established: 1928 as a Game Reserve, 1961 as a National Park
- Governing body: Zimbabwe Parks and Wildlife Management Authority

Hwange National Park, formerly Wankie Game Reserve is the largest protected area in Zimbabwe, with about 14,600 km^{2} (5,600 sq mi) in size. It was founded in 1928 and lies in the northwest of the country, between Bulawayo and Victoria Falls. The nearest town is Dete. It hosts over 100 mammal and 400 bird species.

== History ==
Hwange National Park was founded in 1928. The early reserve faced extensive problems with limited roads into the interior, poaching, and a timber concession which was only ended in 1933. In 1961 the game reserve was proclaimed a National Park.

Hwange National Park was heavily affected by the Second Chimurenga war, with the Wankie Battles fought between ZIPRA and South African Umkhonto we Sizwe (MK) fighters on the one had and Rhodesian Light Infantry troops on the other in late 1967. Much of the park was placed under martial law, and only the area in the vicinity of Main Camp and Nyamandlovu Pan open to the public for much of the 1970s. Ater the end of the war, and the independence of Zimbabwe, the park was re-opened, although the tourist road network was decreased due to deterioration during the war.

In 2011, it was incorporated into the five-nation Kavango - Zambezi Transfrontier Conservation Area through the KAZA TFCA Treaty.

== Geography ==
A grass pan (Roan Pan), during the rainy season

Hwange National Park is located in Matabeleland North Province, west of the Victoria Falls. Most of the park is underlain by Kalahari Sands. In the north-west there are basalt lava flows of the Batoka Formation, stretching from south of Bumbusi to the Botswana border. In the north-central area, from Sinamatella going eastwards, there are granites and gneisses of the Kamativi-Dete Inlier and smaller inliers of these rocks are found within the basalts in the north-west. There are a number of springs in the Sinamatella area, notably the Nichenge Salt Springs and the Tshakabika Hot Springs, and the Dolilo thermal springs in the Robins area.

The north and north-west of the park are drained by the Deka and Lukosi rivers and their tributaries, several of which are dammed as water sources, and the far south of the park is drained by the Gwabadzabuya River, a tributary of the Nata River. There are no rivers in the rest of the park, although there are fossil drainage channels in the main camp and Linkwasha areas, which form seasonal wetlands. In these areas without rivers, waterholes or pans have formed. Some of these pans, such as many of the pans in the Shumba area, are grass pans which fill with rainwater, while others, such as Ngweshla, Shakwanki, Nehimba and Shapi Pan are fed by natural groundwater seeps. Many of the pans, such as Nyamandlovu Pan and Shapi Pan are additionally supplied by water pumped from underground by park authorities, as are some of the small dams, such as Masuma Dam

Hwange National Park is accessed mainly from the north, through Mpofu Gate near Dete for the park headquarters at Main Camp, Mbala Gate south of Hwange town for Sinamatella Camp, and Nantwich Gate east of Mpandamatenga for Robins Camp. There are also a series of minor gates along the east and southeast of the park border, mainly used by park staff and concession holders.

== Archaeological, historical and cultural sites ==
People have lived in the region for tens of thousands of years, as attested by numerous archaeological sites ranging from early Stone Age to the historic era. Stone age foragers hunted and gathered in the region, leaving numerous sites with stone tools throughout today's park. They made engravings of animal hoofprints on sandstone rockshelter walls with some small rock paintings in the park's northwest. Iron-age people built large and small stone-walling sites in the park, such as the Bumbusi National Monument.

== Biodiversity ==
=== Flora ===
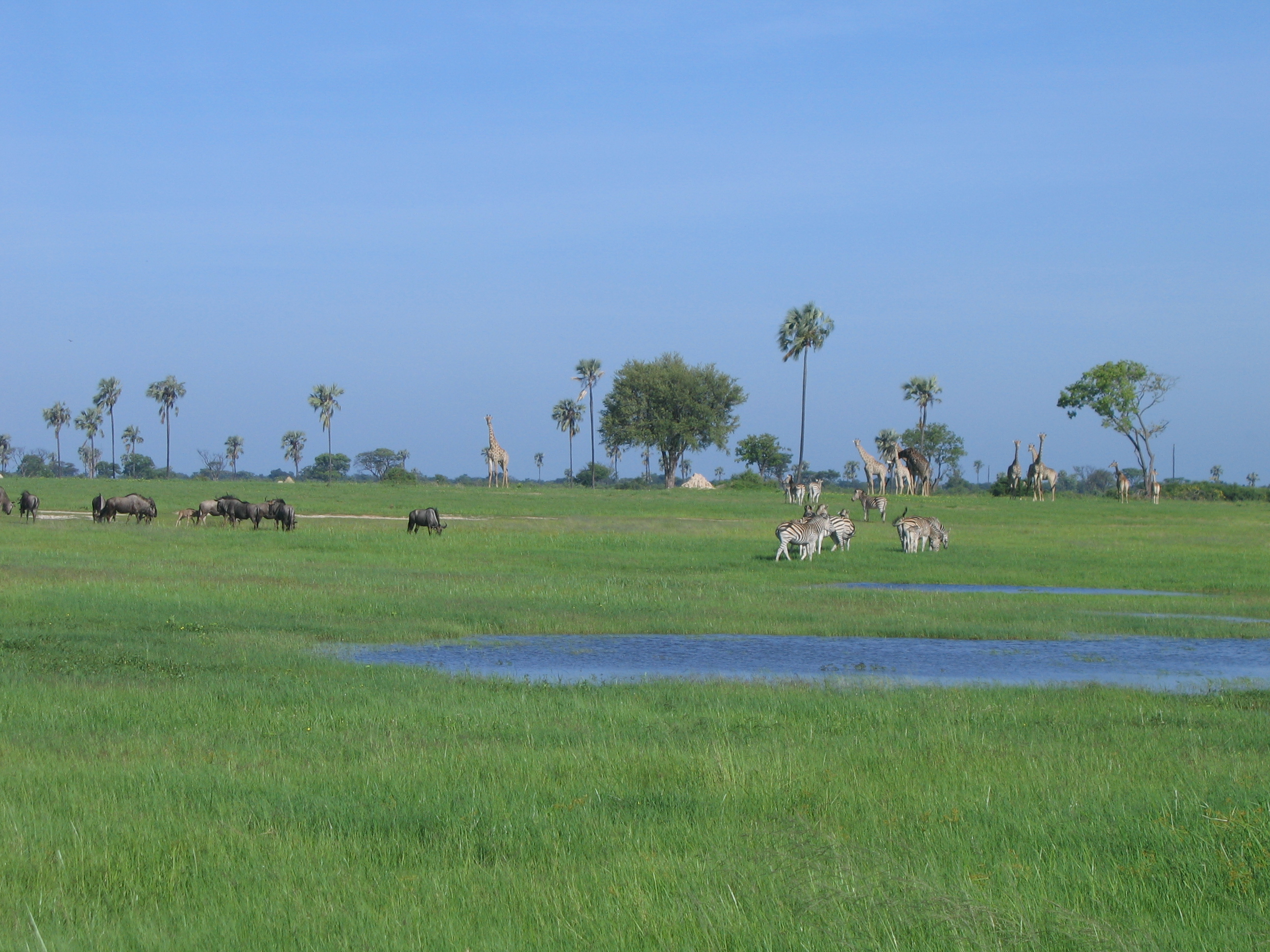
Game at a pan in a vlei or seasonal wetland

The park is close to the edge of the Kalahari desert, a region with little water and very sparse, xerophile vegetation. The Kalahari woodland is dominated by Zambezi Teak, Sand Camwood (Baphia) and Kalahari bauhinia. The north and north-west of the park are dominated by mopane woodland.

It has been argued that elephants cause changes in vegetation structure. However, results of other studies suggest that this is not the case, even with the large increases in elephant population recorded in the late 1980s.

=== Fauna ===
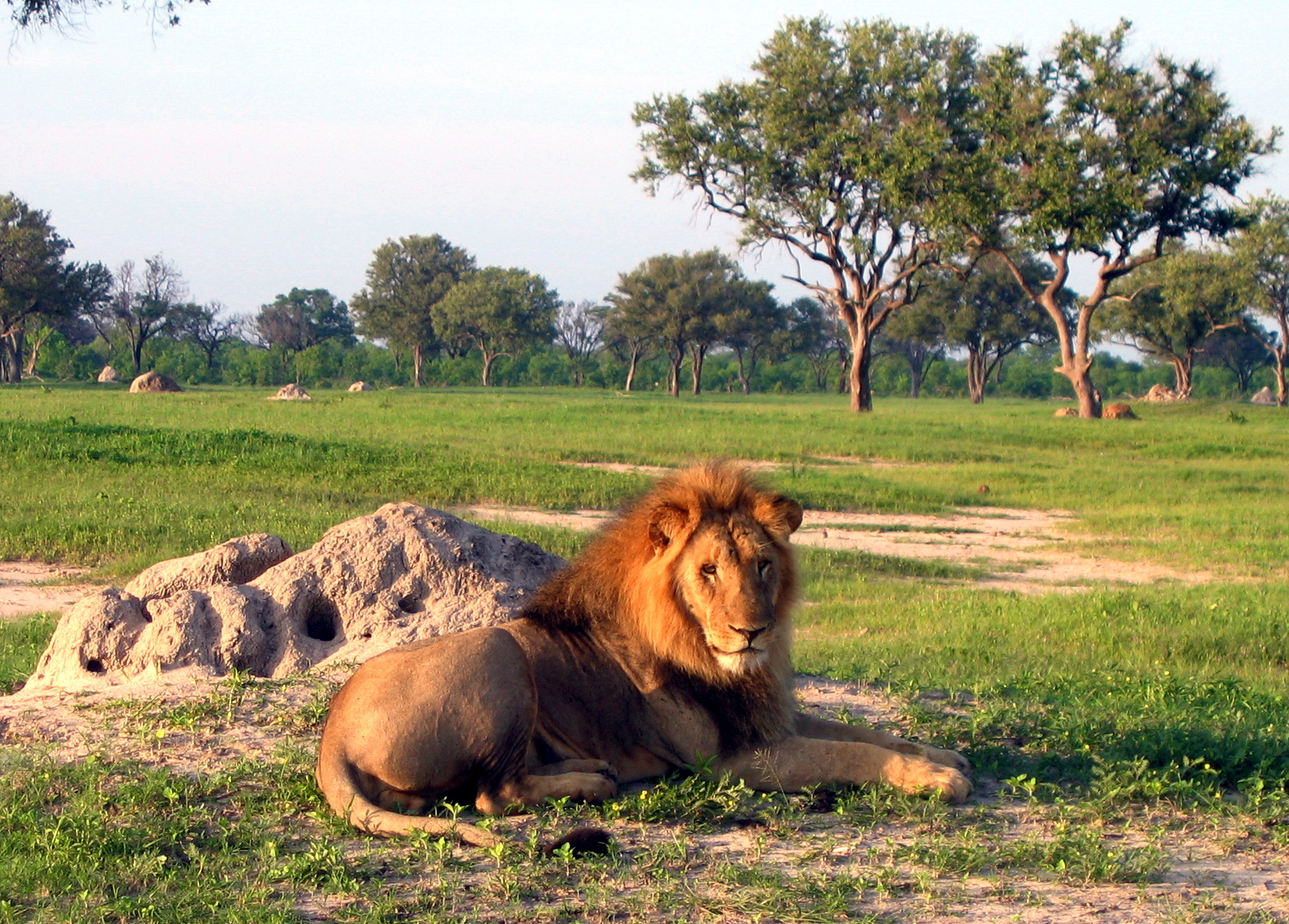
A lion resting near a termite mound

Hwange National Park hosts over 100 mammal and 400 bird species.

Grazing herbivores are more common in the east of the park with mixed feeders more common in the north of the park, which are more heavily wooded. Distribution fluctuates seasonally, with large herbivores concentrating in areas where intensive water pumping is maintained during the dry season.

The population of the African wild dog in Hwange National Park is thought to be of one of the larger surviving groups in Africa today, along with that of Kruger National Park and Selous Game Reserve.

Other major predators include the lion, whose distribution and hunting in Hwange National Park is strongly associated with the pans and waterholes. Since 2005, the protected area is considered a Lion Conservation Unit together with the Okavango Delta.

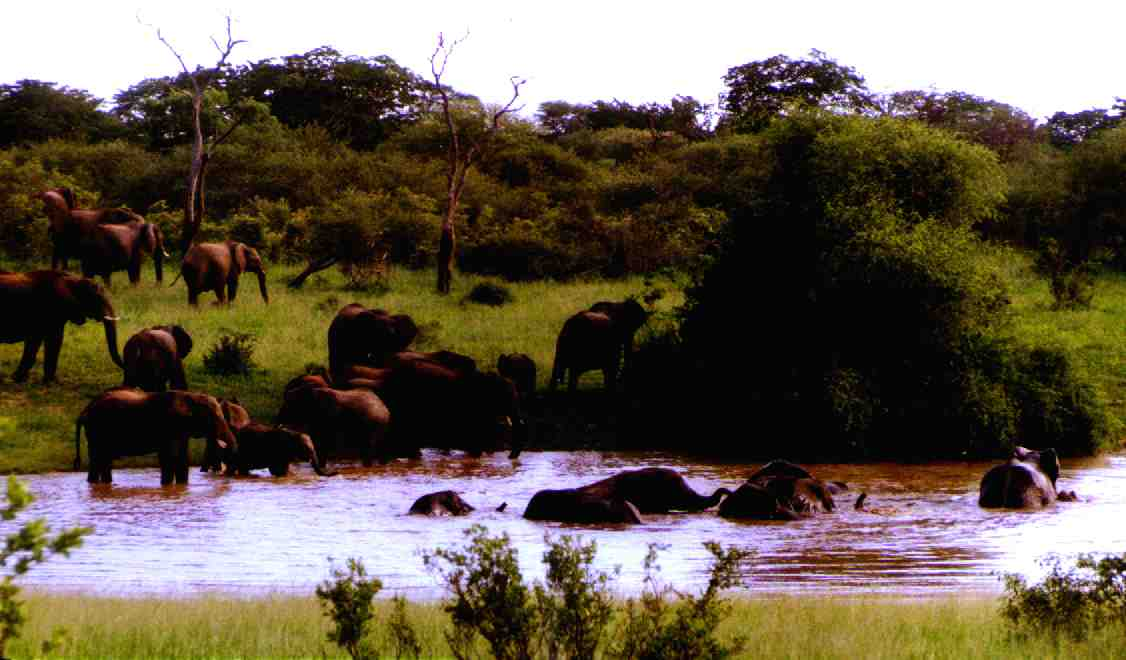
Elephant at Longone Pan

Elephants have been enormously successful in Hwange and the population has increased to far above that naturally supported by such an area. This population of elephants has put a lot of strain on the resources of the park. There has been a lot of debate on how to deal with this, with parks authorities implementing culling to reduce populations, especially during 1967 to 1986. The elephant population doubled in the five years following the end of culling in 1986.

National Parks Scientific Services co-ordinates two major conservation and research projects in the park:

- National Leopard Project, which is surveying numbers of leopard to obtain base-line data for later comparative analysis with status of leopard in consumptive (hunting) areas and Communal Land bordering the National Park.
- Painted Dog Project: The project aims to protect and increase the range and numbers of African wild dog both in Zimbabwe and elsewhere in Africa, and operates through the Painted Dog Conservation organisation in Dete.

==== Birds ====
This overview is only one indication of the diversity of birds in the park and is not a complete list.

- Yellow-billed kite
- Southern ground hornbill
- Dickinson's kestrel
- Racket-tailed roller
- Martial eagle
- Kori bustard
- Black-winged stilt
- Cape griffon
- Pearl-spotted owlet
- African hobby

== Threats ==
In October 2013, it was discovered that poachers killed a large number of African elephants with cyanide after poisoning their waterhole. Conservationists have claimed the incident to be the largest illegal killing of animals in Southern Africa in 25 years. Two aerial surveys were carried to determine the extent of the deaths, and 19 carcasses were identified in the first survey and a further 84 carcasses in the second survey.

In July 2015, Cecil, a lion who had lived on Hwange National Park for 13 years, was killed. This action spurred widespread social media coverage and a petition calling for Zimbabwe's president Robert Mugabe to outlaw big game hunting permits. Walter Palmer, the admitted killer of Cecil, had a permit and was not charged with any crime, as all his papers were in order. Authorities in Zimbabwe have said he is free to visit the country. Charges were initially laid against Theo Bronkhorst, Palmer's guide, for "failing to stop an illegal hunt" but these were later thrown out of court.

Two years after Cecil's killing, his son Xanda met a similar fate. Unlike that of his father, Xanda's killing was not termed illegal, though it did provoke outrage.

== Tourism ==
Nantwich Gate, Northern Wild Area

The platform at Guvalala Pan

Hwange has recorded between 20,000 and 40,000 visitors per year. Tourist infrastructure activities in the park are permitted according to zoning: the north and east are Wild Areas in Zimbabwe Parks and Wildlife Management Authority planning, meaning that tourist activity is permitted, and some supporting infrastructure provided. The Eastern Wild Area is the most developed part of the park, with the permanent rest camp at Main Camp, overnight camping and day visitor sites, and several semi-permanent camps operated by concession-holders. The Northern Wild Area includes the permanent Sinamatella and Robins Camps, three satellite camps, overnight camping and day visitor sites, and semi-permanent camps operated by concession-holders. Tourists may self-drive on authorised roads in the park, or go on game viewer vehicles arranged at the camps. At some places in the park, animals can be viewed at waterholes from hides. In the Eastern Wild Area, these are typically elevated wooden structures, locally referred to as platforms.

The centre and south of the park are wilderness zones, with minimum development, and limited access for guided groups. The concept of wilderness zones was developed in the early days of the park as an equivalent to the United States National Park Service's backcountry areas, adapted for the more inhospitable terrain of Hwange.
