= Thuli Parks and Wildlife Land =

Protected area in Zimbabwe

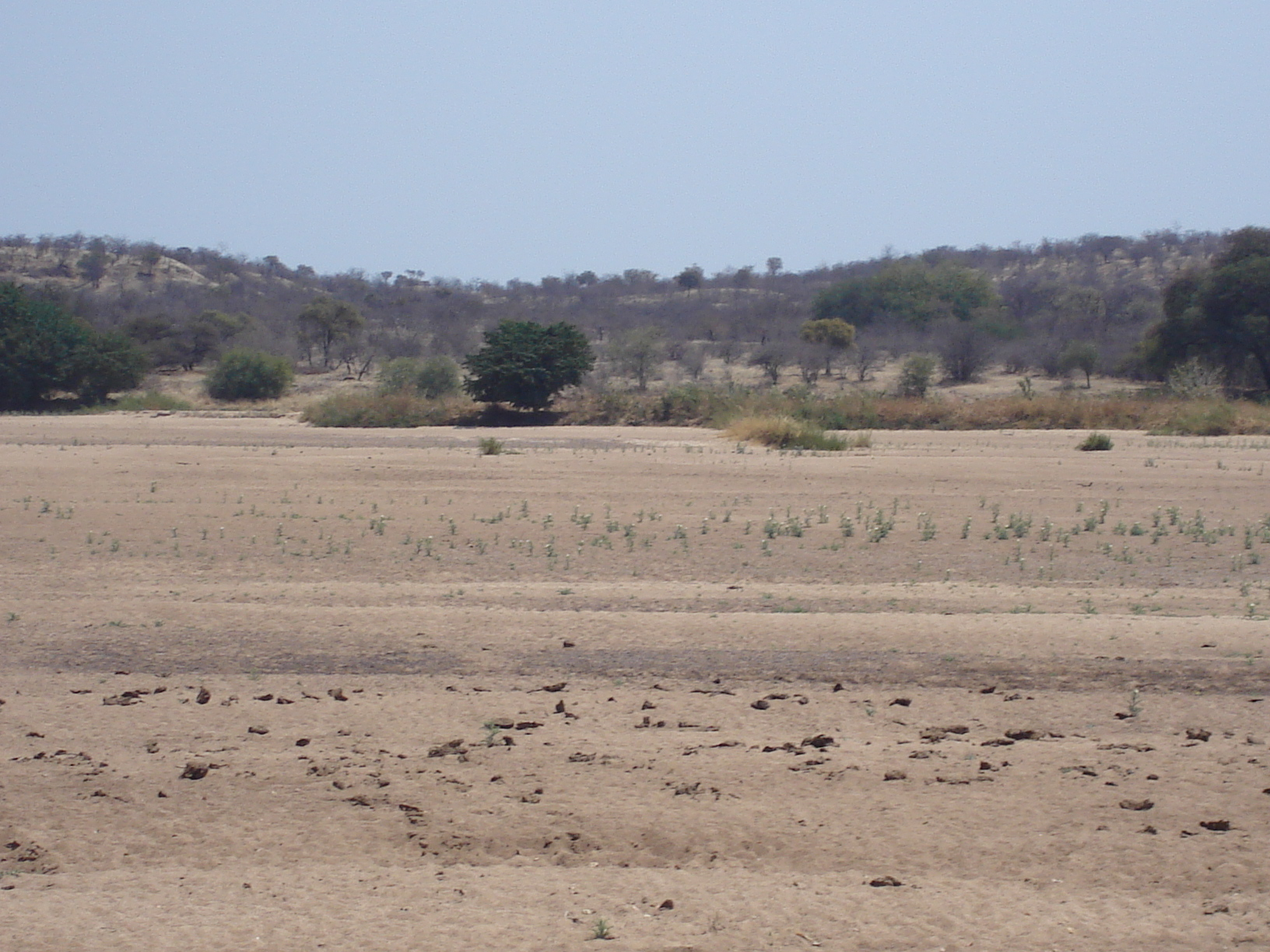
- Looking across the Shashe River into Thuli Safari Area, Zimbabwe
- Interactive map of Thuli Parks and Wildlife Land
- Location: Beitbridge (District) and Gwanda (District), Zimbabwe.
- Nearest city: Beitbridge
- Coordinates: 21°58′13″S 29°7′22″E
- Area: 416 km^{2} (161 sq mi)
- Established: 1958, Safari Area 1975
- Governing body: Zimbabwe Department of National Parks and Wildlife Management

Thuli Parks and Wildlife Land is a protected area in south-western Zimbabwe. It comprises four areas within the Zimbabwe Parks and Wildlife Estate and covers the entire west bank of the Shashe River within the Thuli Circle.

The protected area comprises the Thuli Safari Area, plus three small botanical reserves:

- Pioneer Botanical Reserve, area of 0.38 km^{2}
- South Camp Botanical Reserve, area of 0.26 km^{2}
- Tolo River Botanical Reserve, area of 0.44 km^{2}

The four reserves are administered as a single unit, by the National Parks and Wildlife authority office on the east bank of the Shashe River - just outside the protected area and immediately south of the village of Tuli.

== History of the Park ==
Thuli (Tuli) Safari Area was proclaimed in 1975 and was a controlled hunting area from 1958 until then.

Since 2006, Thuli Parks and Wildlife Land forms the core of the conservation area that Zimbabwe shall contribute to the Greater Mapungubwe Transfrontier Conservation Area.

== Features ==
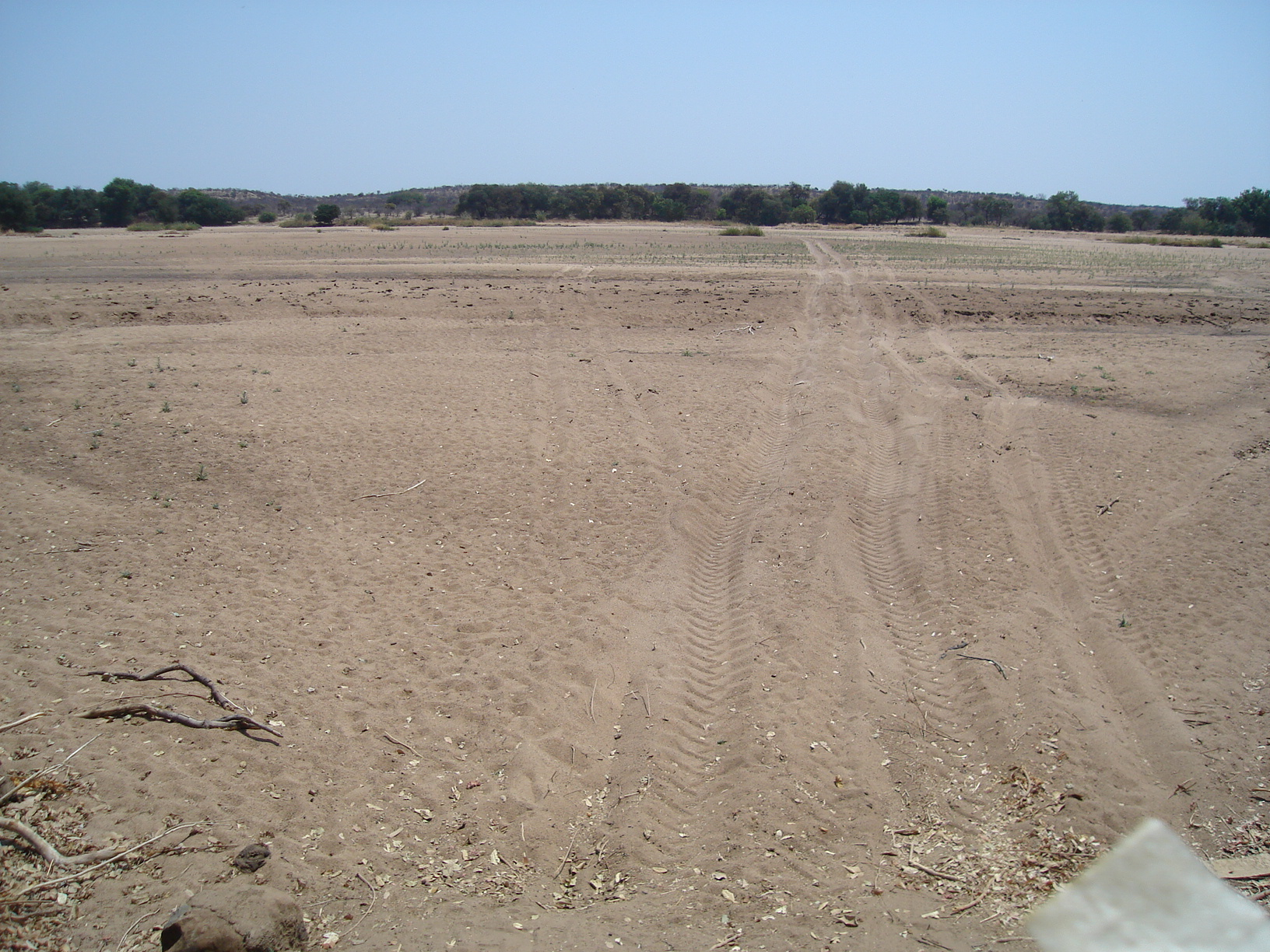
The main access point into Thuli Parks and Wildlife Land, crossing the Shashe River near the park office. Four wheel drive is required.

=== Flora and fauna ===
Most of the Thuli area is scrubland, with Mopane and combretum bush. The Shashe valley, the park's eastern border, supports riverine vegetation such as Ficus and Faidherbia.

Animal life includes African bush elephants, south-western black rhinoceros, lion, African wild dog, Cheetah and African leopard, many of which move freely between the protected area and neighbouring Botswana and South Africa.

=== Geography and geology ===
The protected area comprises a flat landscape, giving way to rugged hilly terrain near the Shashe River. The underlying bedrock is Jurassic basalt, dated at 186.3 ± 1.2 Ma. The basalts fill a NNE-trending trough with inwardly-dipping lava flows, and a well-preserved volcanic caldera.

=== Archaeological, historical and cultural sites ===
A large Fort (Fort Tuli) existed in the center of the protected area, where in the 1890s oxen and horses were rested prior to crossing the Shashe River. The fort was established by the Pioneer Column in 1890, and maintained as a supply base. In the 1970s this building was re-located to the current site, Tuli.

== Accommodation and camping ==
Camping sites exist at the head office and within the safari area. There are no hotels or self-catering accommodation.

Shashe Wilderness Camp, operated by the Wildlife and Environment Zimbabwe (formerly Zimbabwe Wildlife Society), is located just north of the park's headquarters.

== Access ==
Road access is via the village of Tuli, which can be reached from Beitbridge via Nottingham Estate, or from Gwanda via Guyu and Hwali. On each access route, much of the distance is over poor roads, and four wheel drive may be required. Four wheel drive is essentially for crossing the Shashe River to access the park. There is a dirt airstrip at Tuli.

Thuli Safari Area is currently operated through hunting concessions.
