= Nichenge Salt Springs =

Zimbabwean geographical site

- Interactive map of Nichenge Salt Springs
- Location: Sinamatella area, Hwange National Park, Zimbabwe
- Coordinates: 18.60780°S 26.26237°E
- Type: Brine spring
- Temperature: cold

Nichenge Salt Springs are a group of brine springs in the Sinamatella area of Hwange National Park, southwest of Sinamatella on the Salt Springs Loop.

There are three groups of springs, in black clay soils at the base of kopjes where Carboniferous sandstones and shales of the Lower Karoo Group are in faulted contact against Pre-Cambrian basement gneiss.

The water from the springs has a sulfurous smell, and is predominantly a sodium chloride type, with minor sulfate and magnesium. Three attempts were made to extract salt for commercial use in the early twentieth century, but these were all unsuccessful.

The springs can be accessed from two viewpoints, one on the Salt Springs Loop which drives around the edge of the springs, and the other from the main road to Sinamatella.

The springs and river are a source of water for mammals and birds in the area, especially elephants, impala, and zebra.
