= Masuma Dam, Hwange =

Dam in Hwange National Park, Zimbabwe

Masuma Dam
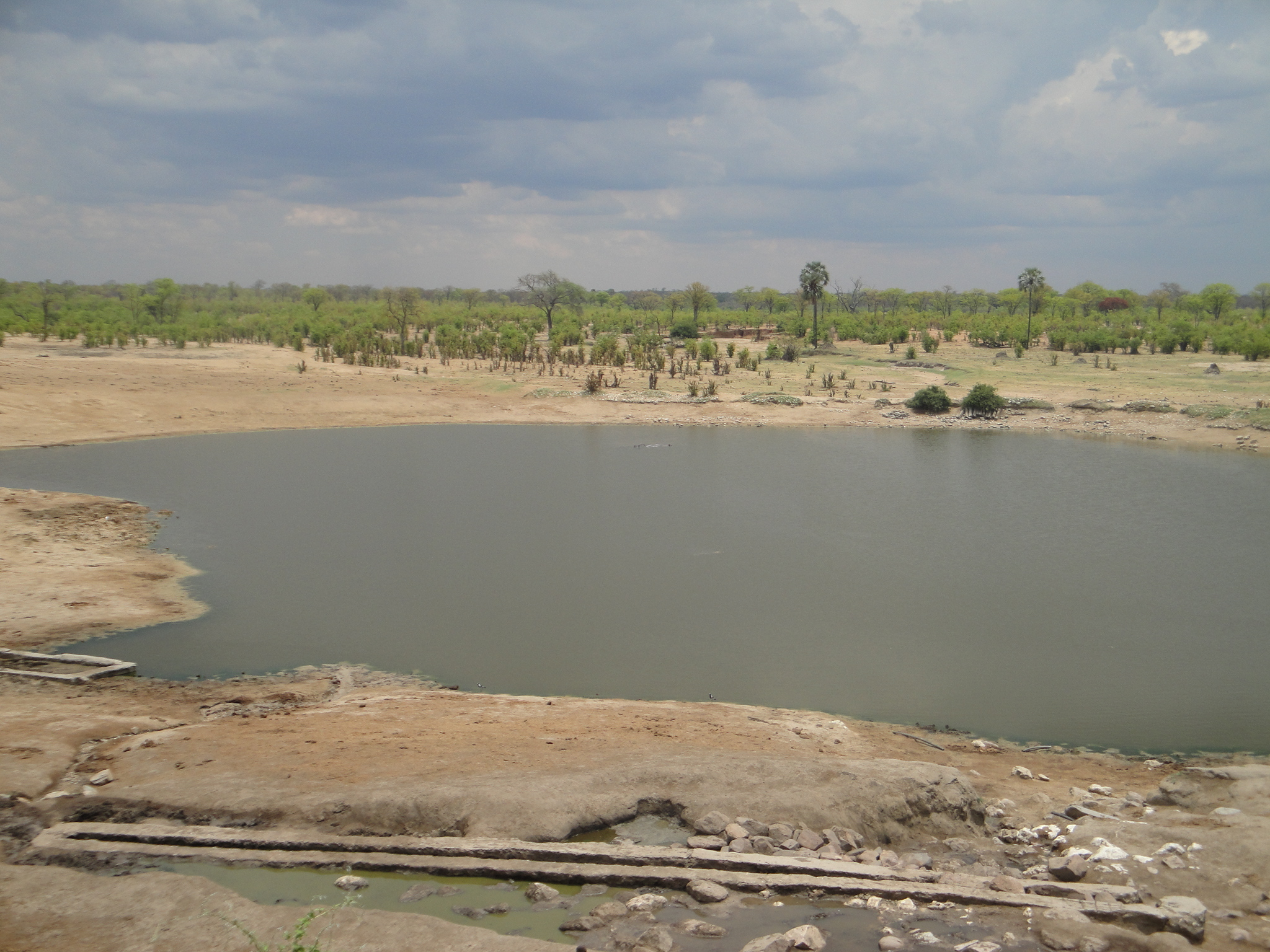
- Interactive map of Masuma Dam
- Location: Hwange National Park, Zimbabwe
- Coordinates: 18.731000°S 26.280212°E

Dam and spillways
- Impounds: Lukosi river

Entrance to the game-viewing hide, Masuma Dam

Masuma Dam is a gravity dam located in the in the Sinamatella area of Hwange National Park, south of Sinamatella on the road to Main Camp.. The dam is used for water supply for wildlife, and the water supply is supplemented by water pumped from a borehole

The dam is inhabited by hippos and Nile crocodiles, and is a source of water for mammals and birds in the area, especially elephants, impala, kudu, and buffalo.

There is an Iron Age arachaeological site in the wetland west of the dam.

Tourist facilities are established on a bluff overlooking the dam, including a game-viewing hide, picnic site for day visitors, and overnight camping site.
