= Zimbabwe Parks and Wildlife Management Authority =

Government agency of Zimbabwe

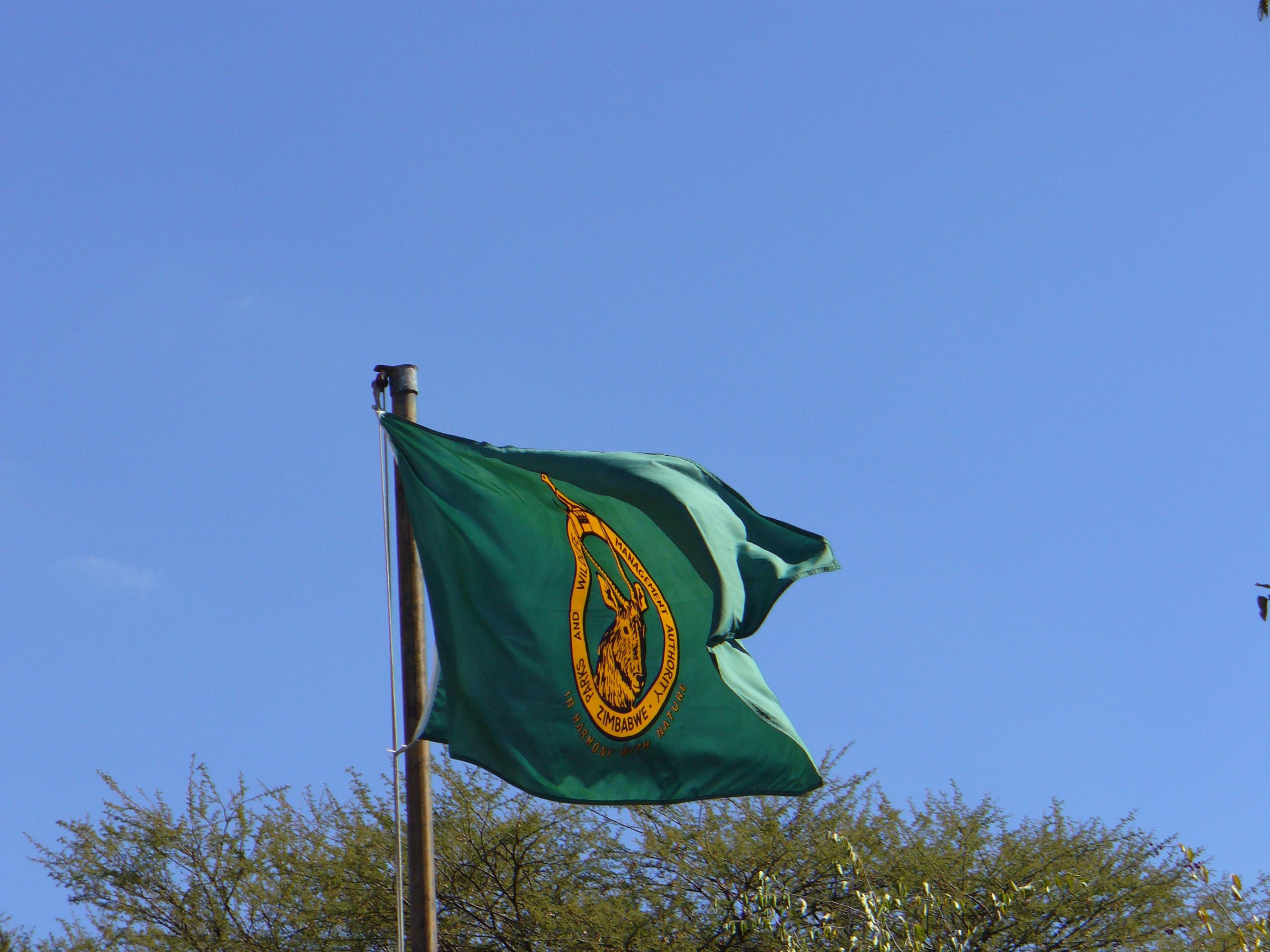
The flag of the Zimbabwe Parks and Wildlife Management Authority

Zimbabwe Parks and Wildlife Management Authority (Zimparks) is an agency of the Zimbabwe government managing national parks. Zimbabwe's game reserves are managed by the government. They were initially founded as a means of using unproductive land.

== History ==
The first proclaimed game reserve was Wankie (now Hwange), formed in 1928 and upgraded in the 1949 National Parks Act. The then-Rhodesia's game section was originally formed in 1952 as a subsidiary of the Department of Mines, Lands and Surveys. This was the nucleus that became the Department of National Parks and Wildlife Management in 1964.

The Parks and Wildlife Act of 1975 established the agency. It was a quintessential breakthrough for conservation. The attitude of people towards wildlife underwent a profound change. Under the act, ownership of wildlife passed from the state to whoever owned the land the animal lived on.

When the landowners (both communal and private) became custodians of the wildlife, a change in mindset occurred. People began to see their wildlife resources as an asset to be nurtured, ensuring their benefits continued into the future. Gradually, fence-breaking elephant and zebra were not viewed as nuisances to be eradicated; herds of impala were no longer a quick, easy meal.

Within the Parks and Wildlife Act, various levels were defined at which state-owned land was to be protected and utilised. Gone was the old Game Department that issued hunting licences which, for a nominal fee, allowed settlers to hunt wildlife in all areas but a few game reserves. A system of national parks, botanical reserves and gardens, sanctuaries, recreational parks and safari areas was set firmly in place. Since 1975, the act has been amended and refined, allowing the evolution of a dynamic wildlife-protection process.

Many African countries have since adopted this philosophy. So far-reaching was the concept of the original act that it now enshrines many aspects of grassroots conservation being implemented worldwide. Communal or traditional tribal areas and privately owned land were also categorised for different levels of utilisation.

Communal areas harbouring significant wildlife resources or bordering national parks were given Appropriate Authority status through their Rural Councils, and as a result the Communal Areas Management Programme for Indigenous Resources was born. CAMPFIRE has developed into an important conservation strategy, ensuring that significant financial earnings revert to rural communities for their benefit. This philosophy has been adopted on a pan-African basis and is slowly being implemented in Asia and South America as well.

Many of Zimbabwe's national parks, such as Victoria Falls, Mana Pools and Hwange, are renowned worldwide, though the country also has lesser-known gems such as Chizarira and Gonarezhou. Parts of the Rhodes Estate, established in Rhodes' will of 1902, were bequeathed to the nation for farming, forestry and agricultural research. This land later became part of the rocky Matobo and mountainous Nyanga National Parks.

== Current peace parks ==
- Chimanimani Transfrontier Conservation Area
- Great Limpopo Transfrontier Park
- Greater Mapungubwe Transfrontier Conservation Area

== Future peace parks ==
- Kavango - Zambezi Transfrontier Conservation Area

== Current national parks ==
- Chimanimani National Park
- Chizarira National Park
- Gonarezhou National Park
- Hwange National Park
- Kazuma Pan National Park
- Mana Pools National Park
- Matobo National Park
- Matusadona National Park
- Nyanga National Park, which incorporates Mutarazi Falls National Park
- Victoria Falls National Park
- Zambezi National Park

== Current recreational parks ==
- Bangala Dam Recreational Park
- Chinhoyi Caves Recreational Park
- Darwendale Recreational Park
- Insiza Dam Recreational Park, also known as Mayfair Dam and Lake Cunningham
- Kavira Hot Springs Recreational Park, near Mlibizi
- Lake Chivero Recreational Park (formerly McIlwaine)
- Lake Kariba Recreational Park
- Lake Mutirikwe (formerly Kyle) Recreational Park
- Manjirenji Dam Recreational Park
- Lake Matopos Recreational Park
- Mupfure (formerly Umfuli) Recreational Park
- Mzingwane Dam Recreational Park
- Ngezi Recreational Park
- Sebakwe Recreational Park
- MBIZI Recreational Park

== Current sanctuaries ==
- Chimanimani Eland Sanctuary
- Manjinji Pan Sanctuary
- Mbazhe Pan Sanctuary
- Mushandike Sanctuary
- Nyamaneche Sanctuary
- Tshabalala Sanctuary

== Current safari areas ==
- Charara Safari Area
- Chegutu Safari Area (formerly Hartley A)
- Chete Safari Area
- Chewore Safari Area
- Chipinge Safari Area
- Chirisa Safari Area
- Dande Safari Area
- Deka Safari Area
- Doma Safari Area
- Hurungwe Safari Area
- Malipati Safari Area
- Matetsi Safari Area
- Sapi Safari Area
- Sibilobilo Safari Area
- Thuli Safari Area

== Botanical gardens and reserves ==
- Bunga Forest Botanical Reserve
- Chisekera Hot Springs Botanical Reserve
- Ewanrigg Botanical Garden
- Haroni Forest Botanical Reserve
- Mazoe Botanical Reserve
- Mwari Raphia Palm Botanical Reserve
- National Botanic Garden
- Pioneer Botanical Reserve
- Rusitu Forest Botanical Reserve
- Sebakwe Acacia Karoo Botanical Reserve
- Sebakwe Great Dyke Botanical Reserve
- Sebakwe Mountain Acacia Botanical Reserve
- South Camp Botanical Reserve
- Tingwa Rafia Palm Botanical Reserve
- Tolo River Botanical Reserve
- Vumba Botanical Gardens and Reserve
