= Game viewer vehicle =

Game Viewer Vehicle
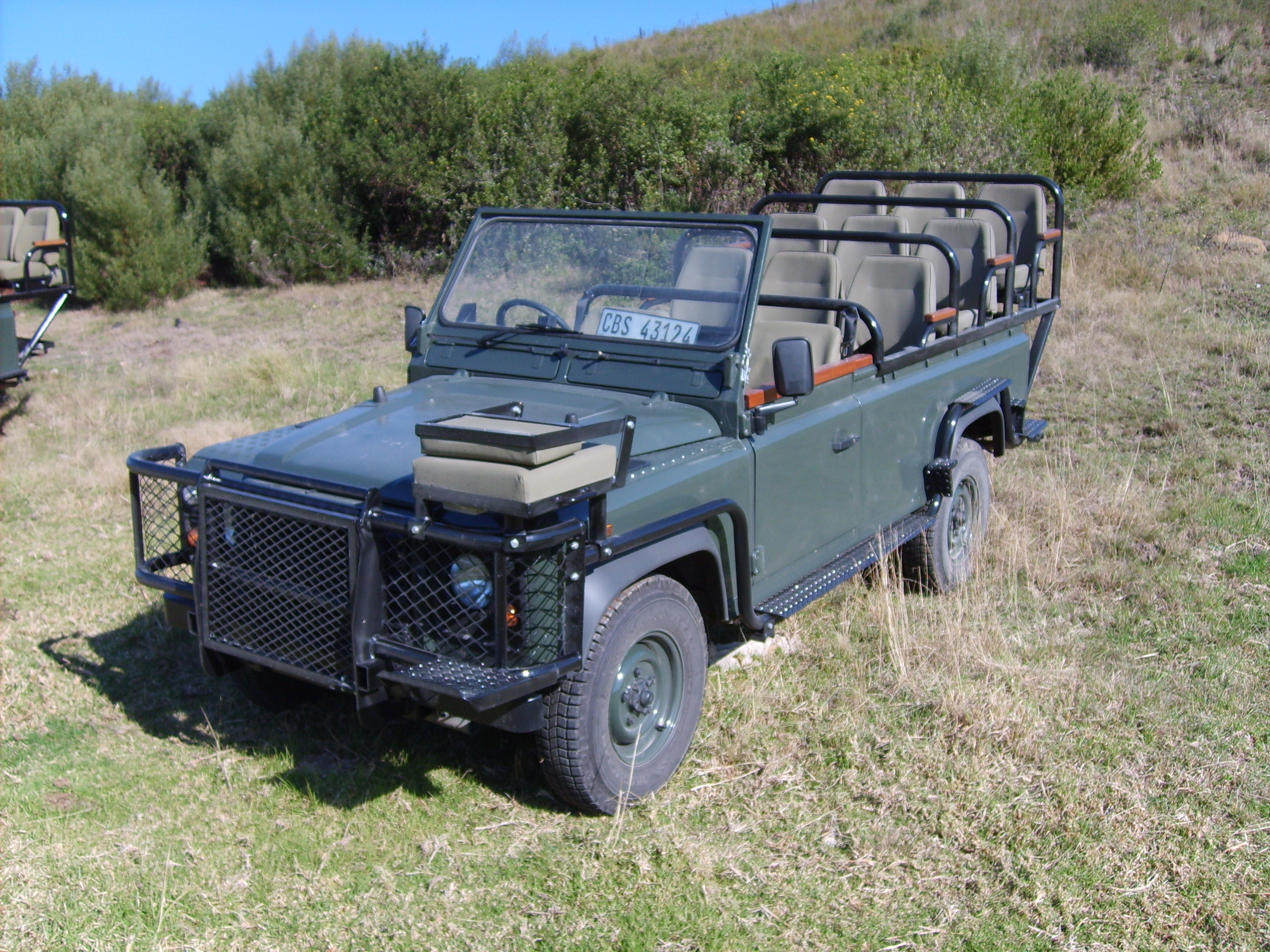

Overview
- Manufacturer: Vehicle Modification Companies

Body and chassis
- Class: Off-road vehicle

A game viewer vehicle, game viewing vehicle or safari vehicle is an off-road vehicle that is converted or modified to carry many people, seated in positions in which they can view game in game reserves. These vehicles are usually open and do not have roofs, to improve visibility and keep obstructions out of the way. These vehicles are usually four wheel drive and have a load area on the back, which when converted will house the seats.

There are many companies that make these modifications, they are either bought vehicles that have been taken to a conversion company or they are bought by the company, converted, then sold. Some vehicle manufacturers sell these vehicles ready-made.

These vehicles are usually only seen in countries where there are game reserves, usually in East and Southern Africa. Common variations of vehicles converted for game viewers are the Land Rover Defender, Toyota LandCruiser 70 Series and other common off-road vehicles. These are the ideal vehicles as they are made to carry nine passengers besides the ranger. This allows interaction and personalized attention during a game drive. The larger game lodges in the public game reserves like the Kruger National Park and Pilanesberg National Park in South Africa operate modified trucks which can seat twenty-five passengers.

== Electric safari vehicles ==
Safari companies began introducing electric safari vehicles some time in the mid 2010s. There is some discrepancy on which company and country first introduced an EV for safaris, but many high-end lodges have switched to exclusively using solar-powered vehicles, including boats. In addition to Land Rover and Toyota, Rivian manufactures EV for safaris. The lack of engine noise increases stealth and reduces local noise and air pollution.

== See also ==
- Overlanding
