= Manyame River =

Rivers in Zimbabwe

Manyame River Panhame, Hunyani
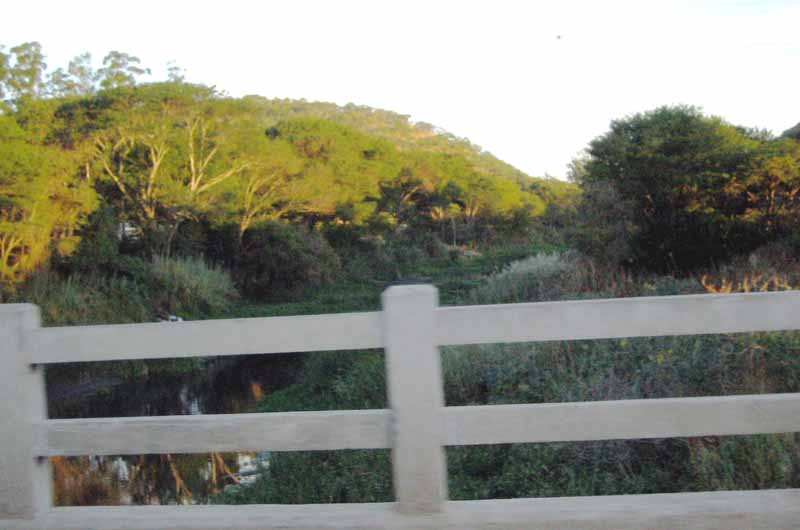

- The Hunyani (Manyame) basin

Location
- Country: Zimbabwe, Mozambique

Physical characteristics
- Source
  - elevation: 1,752 m (5,748 ft)
- Mouth: Cahora Bassa
  - coordinates: 15°42′21″S 30°39′00″E
  - elevation: 326 m (1,070 ft)

The Manyame River, also known as Panhame and formerly as Hunyani, is a river located in Zimbabwe and Mozambique, and a tributary of the Zambezi River.
