= Watering hole =

Depression which a body of water forms

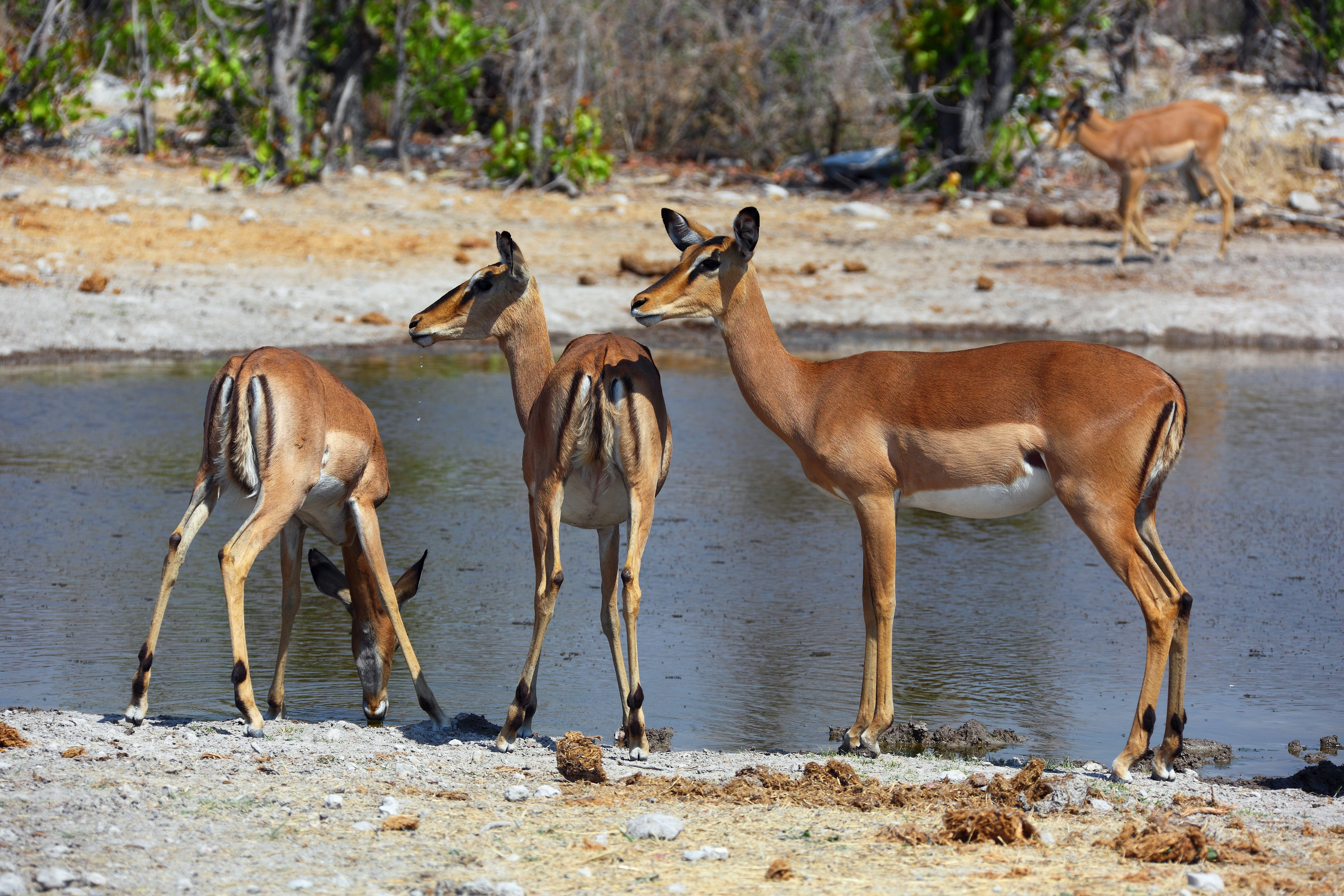
A watering hole is a natural geological depression where water collects

A watering hole or waterhole is a geological depression in which a body of water forms, usually a pond or a small lake. A watering hole is "a sunken area of land that fills with water".

Watering holes may be ephemeral or seasonal. Ephemeral rivers sometimes form waterholes in geological depressions or areas scoured by erosion, and are common in arid regions of Australia. In Australia, the term "billabong", often defined as a type of oxbow lake (an isolated crescentic pond left behind after a river loop is cut off when the river channel changes course), is also used to refer to other types of waterholes. While they exist in both wetlands and arid lands, they are of particular importance in desert areas of Australia, where they are often the only water source for native animals, people, and livestock, and provide critical habitat for a number of wildlife species. Their existence is being threatened by climate change. Desert waterholes are often found in dry hilly areas, sustained by discharge of groundwater, remaining for long periods after flood events or normal flows of rivers and creeks. Depending on the climate, they can be permanent or semi-permanent depending on climatic conditions. They are of particular importance to Indigenous Australians in desert areas, providing water to the local population as well as attracting animals which are used as food, and sustaining plants which can be used for food (bush tucker), bush medicine, tools, shelter, and clothing. They may also be of cultural significance, as places to conduct ceremonies, and are usually named and part of their jukurrpa (Dreaming) stories. Gnamma (or namma) holes are a precious source of potable water in desert areas.

Another process by which waterholes may be formed is from elephants digging up termite mounds for nutrients in the soil, repeatedly digging at the same location until a depression large enough to hold a substantial amount of water is formed.

Artificial human-made watering holes can be a common addition to geological ones, where the water source would be underground water which would be pumped to the surface. These watering holes can be used to support animals during dry seasons when natural watering waterholes are harder to find but also to help against human-wildlife conflict when animals are more desperate for water. Some of these holes can even be built large enough for the animals to bathe in, and because of the permanence of these waterholes, they can become popular spots for tourists to watch wildlife and some of them even have lodges or live streaming cameras placed nearby.

In Africa, animals often gather at waterholes to drink the water. A common misconception associated with watering holes is that, due to the common need for water, predator animals will not attack prey animals in the vicinity of the watering hole. This trope was exploited, for example, by Rudyard Kipling in The Jungle Book, which describes a "truce" at the watering hole as a plot point. In fact, it has been observed that "lions usually ambush their prey by hiding in long grass, often in close proximity to a watering hole".

One study noted that watering holes can serve as a locus of disease transmission, and observed that "all animals displayed some degree of increased watering hole use with at least one metric of decreased water availability, suggesting that drying environments may contribute to increased parasite concentration at these hotspots across species".
