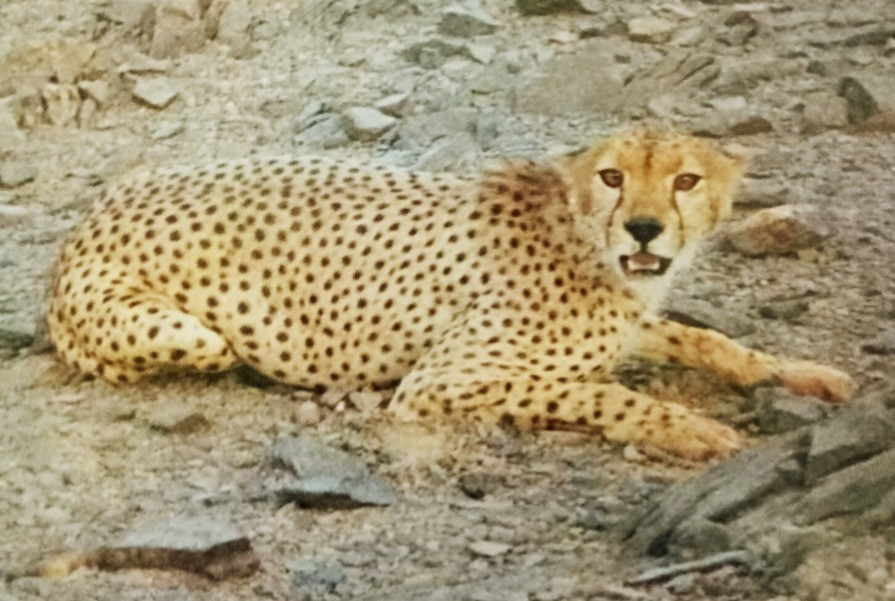
- Northwest African Cheetah, Idlès, Algeria

Conservation status
- Critically Endangered (IUCN 3.1)

Scientific classification
- Kingdom: Animalia
- Phylum: Chordata
- Class: Mammalia
- Order: Carnivora
- Family: Felidae
- Genus: Acinonyx
- Species: A. jubatus
- Subspecies: A. j. hecki

Trinomial name
- Acinonyx jubatus hecki Hilzheimer, 1913
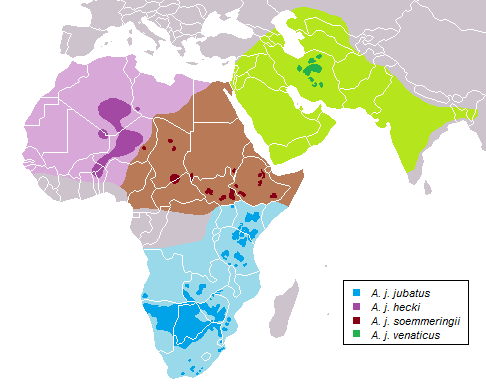
- A. j. hecki range historical today

Synonyms
- A. j. senegalensis (Blainville, 1843)

= Northwest African cheetah =

Subspecies of carnivore

The Northwest African cheetah (Acinonyx jubatus hecki), also known as the Saharan cheetah, is a cheetah subspecies living in the Sahara and the Sahel. It is listed as Critically Endangered on the IUCN Red List. In 2008, the population was suspected to number less than 250 mature individuals. It was scientifically described by Max Hilzheimer in 1913 under the scientific name Acinonyx hecki.

== Taxonomy ==
Felis jubata senegalensis was described by Henri Marie Ducrotay de Blainville in 1843 based on a cheetah from Senegal. As this name was preoccupied, it is considered synonymous with A. j. hecki.

Acinonyx hecki was the scientific name proposed in 1913 by Max Hilzheimer, who described a captive cheetah in the Berlin Zoological Garden that also originated in Senegal.

== Characteristics ==
The Northwest African cheetah is quite different in appearance from the other African cheetahs. Its coat is shorter and nearly white in color, with spots that fade from black over the spine to light brown on the legs. The face has few or even no spots, and the tear stripes (dark stripes running from the medial canthus of each eye down the side of the muzzle to the corner of the mouth) are often missing. The body shape is basically the same as that of the sub-Saharan cheetah, except that it is somewhat smaller.

== Distribution and habitat ==
This cheetah ranges in the western and central Sahara and the Sahel in small, fragmented populations. Based on data from 2007 to 2012, the cheetah population in West, Central and North Africa has been estimated at 457 individuals in an area of 1,037,322 km^{2} (400,512 sq mi), including 238 cheetahs in Central African Republic and Chad, 191 cheetahs in Algeria and Mali, and 25 cheetahs in the transboundary W, Arli, and Pendjari protected area complex in Benin, Burkina Faso and Niger.

In Niger, populations occur in the northern parts of the country in the Ténéré desert and in the southern savanna region of W National Park. Records in Togo date to the 1970s. The Saharan cheetah is thought to be regionally extinct in Morocco, Western Sahara, Senegal, Guinea, Guinea-Bissau, Sierra Leone, Côte d'Ivoire and Ghana.

In Mali, cheetahs were sighted in Adrar des Ifoghas and in the Kidal Region in the 1990s. In 2010, a cheetah was photographed in Niger's Termit Massif by a camera trap.

No cheetah was recorded in the North Province, Cameroon during a survey carried out between January 2008 and May 2010.

Between August 2008 and November 2010, four individuals were recorded by camera traps in Ahaggar National Park located in south central Algeria. A single cheetah was once again filmed and photographed by Algerian naturalists in 2020 in the same park in the Atakor volcanic field whose peaks approach a height of 3,000 m (9,800 ft).

In the 2020s, the remains of over 50 cheetah specimen were discovered in the Lauga caves in northern Saudi Arabia, including seven mummified ones. Some of the remains, which were radiocarbondated to 4,200 years ago, genetically match the Northwest African cheetah; more recent specimens genetically match the Asiatic cheetah.

== Behavior and ecology ==
In the Sahara desert, day-time temperature exceeds 40 °C (104 °F), water is scarce and rainfall irregular. Two camera trapping surveys in the Ahaggar massif revealed that cheetahs in this area exhibit several behavioral adaptations to this harsh climate: they are predominantly nocturnal and active between sunset and early mornings; they travel larger distances and occur at a lower density than cheetahs living in savannas.

The main prey of the Northwest African cheetah are antelopes which have adapted to an arid environment, such as the addax, Dorcas gazelle, rhim gazelle, and dama gazelle. It also preys on smaller mammals such as hares. Cheetahs can subsist without direct access to water, obtaining water indirectly from the blood of their prey.

== See also ==
- Northeast African cheetah
- African humid period
