= Sarah (cheetah) =

Female South African cheetah

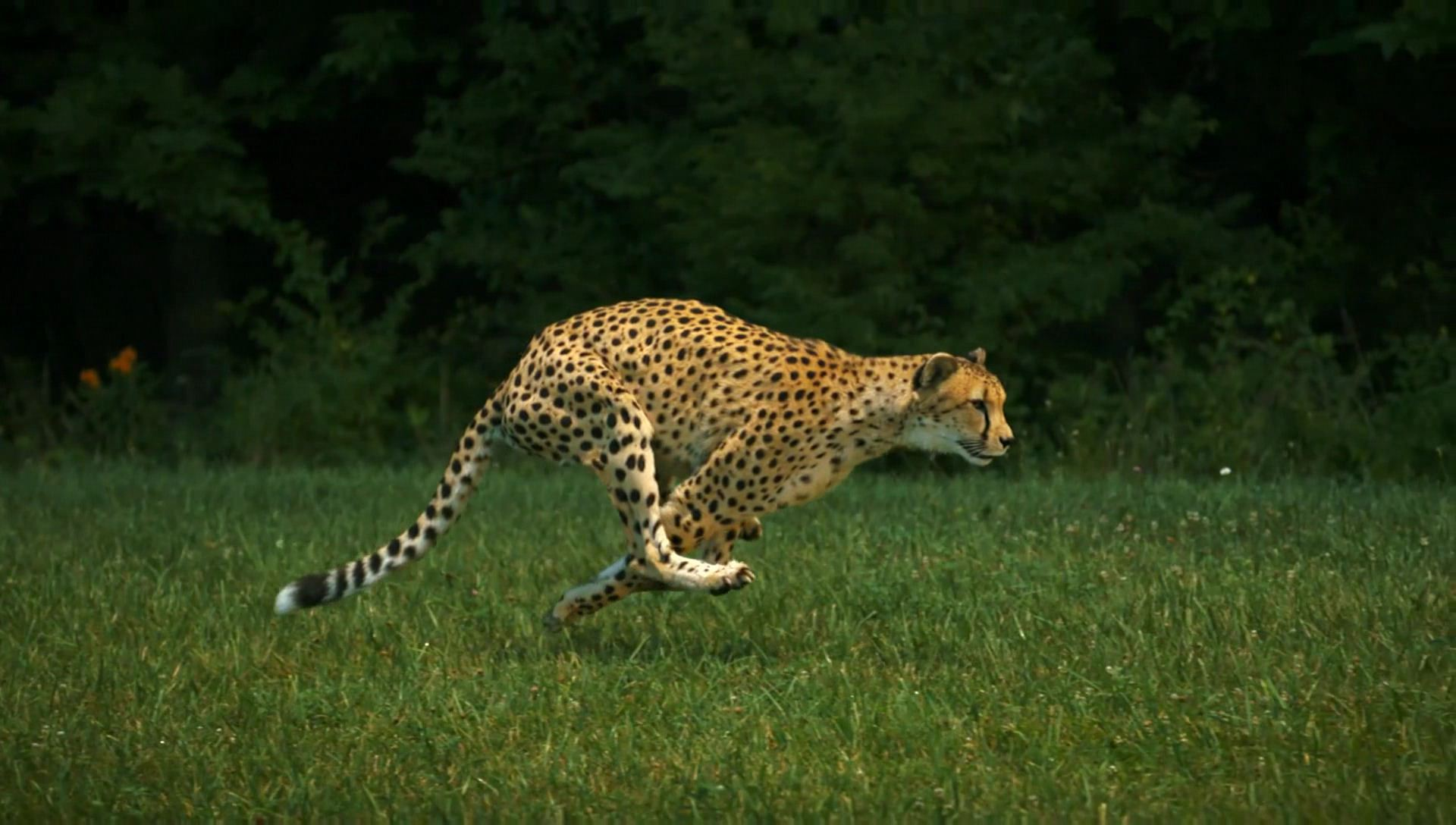
- Captured image of Sarah from a high speed video clip
- Species: Cheetah (Acinonyx jubatus)
- Sex: Female
- Born: c. 2001
- Died: January 22, 2016 (aged 14–15); Cincinnati, Ohio
- Known for: World's fastest land mammal, fastest cheetah
- Owner: Cincinnati Zoo
- Residence: Cincinnati Zoo
- Parent: Unknown
- Appearance: National Geographic magazine, National Geographic Films World's Fastest Animal

Sarah, also known as Sahara, (c. 2001–January 22, 2016) was a female South African cheetah (Acinonyx jubatus jubatus) that lived in the Cincinnati Zoo in Cincinnati, Ohio. Sarah was known as the world's fastest land mammal according to National Geographic magazine. She ran 100 meters in 5.95 seconds (more precisely, 5.9564 seconds and up to 61 miles an hour (98 km/h)) in 2012, when she was 11 years old. She died on January 22, 2016, at the supposed age of 15.

Sarah came to the Cincinnati Zoo when she was six weeks old and was raised by Cathryn Hilker, who was the founder of the Zoo's Cat Ambassador Program. Sarah was one of the first cheetah cubs to be raised with a puppy companion, who was named Alexa. Throughout her time at the zoo, Sarah had many trainers, but her favorite was the trainer who raised her, Cathryn Hilker. When it came to completing tasks, Sarah would challenge every trainer except Cathryn; they had a relationship that every trainer would want to have. Even when Sarah was retired, Cathryn visited her often.

As a cat ambassador, Sarah visited hundreds of schools over fifteen years to heighten awareness for the plight of the cheetah. She was featured in many print and online magazines and even a local zoo commercial.

Sarah and Alexa, an Anatolian shepherd, were lifelong companions. They appeared together at schools, summer shows, and on TV until Alexa retired, whereafter Sarah continued to perform solo.

Sarah greatly surpassed Usain Bolt's 100 meter time of 9.58 seconds. Kim Hubbard said that when Sarah broke the record, she looked like a "polka dotted missile."
