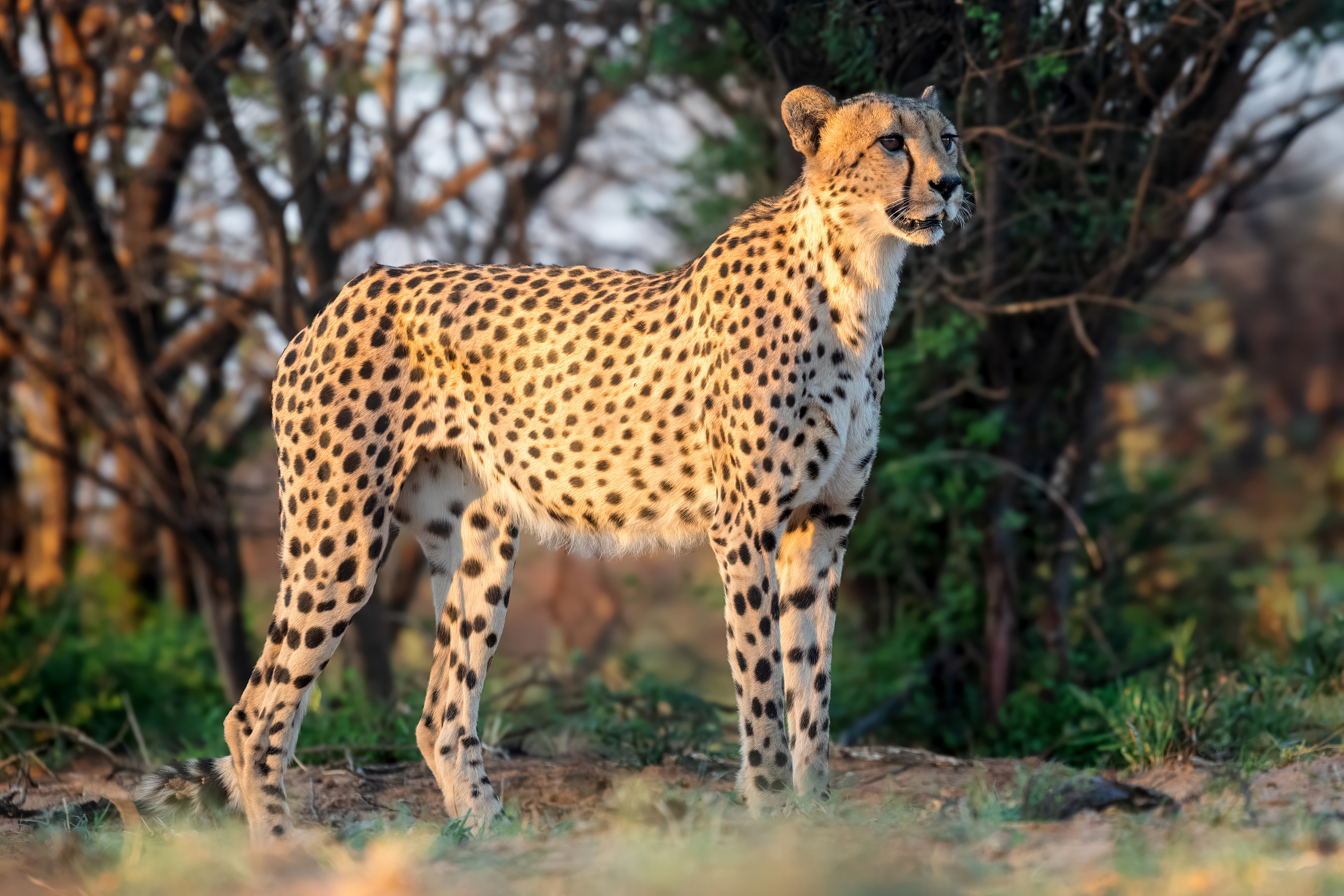
- Male cheetah in South Africa

Conservation status
- Vulnerable (IUCN 3.1)
- CITES Appendix I

Scientific classification
- Kingdom: Animalia
- Phylum: Chordata
- Class: Mammalia
- Order: Carnivora
- Family: Felidae
- Subfamily: Felinae
- Genus: Acinonyx
- Species: A. jubatus

Binomial name
- Acinonyx jubatus (Schreber, 1775)

Subspecies
- List: Southeast African cheetah (A. j. jubatus) (Schreber, 1775); Asiatic cheetah (A. j. venaticus) (Griffith, 1821); Northeast African cheetah (A. j. soemmeringii) (Fitzinger, 1855); Northwest African cheetah (A. j. hecki) (Hilzheimer, 1913)
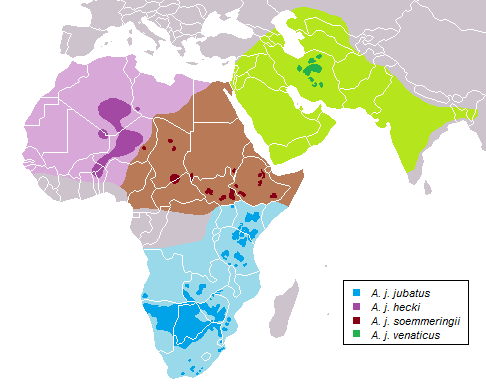
- Historic (light) and present (dark) range of cheetah subspecies

Synonyms
- List: Acinonyx venator Brookes, 1828; A. guepard Hilzheimer, 1913; A. rex Pocock, 1927; A. wagneri Hilzheimer, 1913; Cynaelurus guttatus Mivart, 1900; Cynaelurus jubata Mivart, 1900; Cynaelurus lanea Heuglin, 1861; Cynailurus jubatus Wagler, 1830; Cynailurus soemmeringii Fitzinger, 1855; Cynofelis guttata Lesson, 1842; Cynofelis jubata Lesson, 1842; Felis fearonii Smith, 1834; F. fearonis Fitzinger, 1855; F. megabalica Heuglin, 1863; F. megaballa Heuglin, 1868; Guepar jubatus Boitard, 1842; Gueparda guttata Gray, 1867; Guepardus guttata Duvernoy, 1834; Guepardus jubatus Duvernoy, 1834

= Cheetah =

Cheetah Temporal range: Pleistocene–Present

Large feline of the genus Acinonyx

The cheetah (Acinonyx jubatus) is a species of large feline and the only living member of the genus Acinonyx. The cheetah is a pursuit predator and the fastest land animal, capable of running at 93–104 km/h (58–65 mph); it has evolved for speed, having powerful hindlimb muscles and a long lumbar spine. The cheetah has a tawny to creamy white or pale buff fur that is marked with evenly spaced, solid black spots. The head is small and rounded, with a short snout and black tear-like facial streaks. It has a height of 67–94 cm (2.20–3.08 ft) at the shoulder, and the head-and-body length is between 1.1 and 1.5 m (3 ft 7 in and 4 ft 11 in). Adults weigh between 21 and 65 kg (46 and 143 lb).

The cheetah was first scientifically described in the late 18th century. Four subspecies are recognised today that are native to Africa and central Iran. An African subspecies was introduced to India in 2022. It is now distributed mainly in small, fragmented populations in northwestern, eastern and southern Africa and central Iran. It lives in a variety of habitats such as savannahs in the Serengeti, arid mountain ranges in the Sahara, and hilly desert terrain.

The cheetah lives in three main social groups: females and their cubs, male "coalitions", and solitary males. While females lead a nomadic life searching for prey in large home ranges, males are more sedentary and instead establish much smaller territories in areas with plentiful prey and access to females. The cheetah is active during the day, with peaks during dawn and dusk. It feeds on small- to medium-sized prey, mostly weighing under 40 kg (88 lb), and prefers medium-sized ungulates such as impala, springbok and Thomson's gazelles. The cheetah typically stalks and approaches its prey within 30–200 m (98–656 ft) before charging at high speed, striking down the prey with its dewclaw in full pursuit and killing it with a throat bite. It breeds throughout the year. After a gestation of nearly three months, females give birth to a litter of three or four cubs, who are weaned at around four months and are independent by around 20 months of age. Cheetah cubs are highly vulnerable to predation by other large carnivores such as lions and hyenas, who also routinely steal kills from adult cheetahs.

The cheetah is threatened by habitat loss, conflict with humans, poaching and high susceptibility to diseases. The global cheetah population was estimated at 6,517 mature individuals in 2021; it is listed as Vulnerable on the IUCN Red List. It has been widely depicted in art, literature, advertising, and animation. Although not usually considered a target of domestication, the cheetah had been tamed in ancient Egypt and trained for hunting ungulates in the Arabian Peninsula and India, and has been kept in zoos since the early 19th century.

== Etymology ==
The vernacular name "cheetah" is derived from Hindustani Urdu: چیتا and Hindi: चीता (ćītā). This in turn comes from Sanskrit: चित्रय (Chitra-ya) meaning 'variegated', 'adorned' or 'painted'.

The generic name Acinonyx probably derives from the combination of the Greek words ἀκίνητος (akī́nētos) meaning 'unmoved' or 'motionless', and ὄνυξ (ónyx) meaning 'nail' roughly meaning "immobile nails" from the cheetah's limited ability to retract its claws. A similar meaning can be obtained by the combination of the Greek prefix a– (implying a lack of) and κῑνέω (kīnéō) meaning 'to move' or 'to set in motion'.

== Taxonomy ==
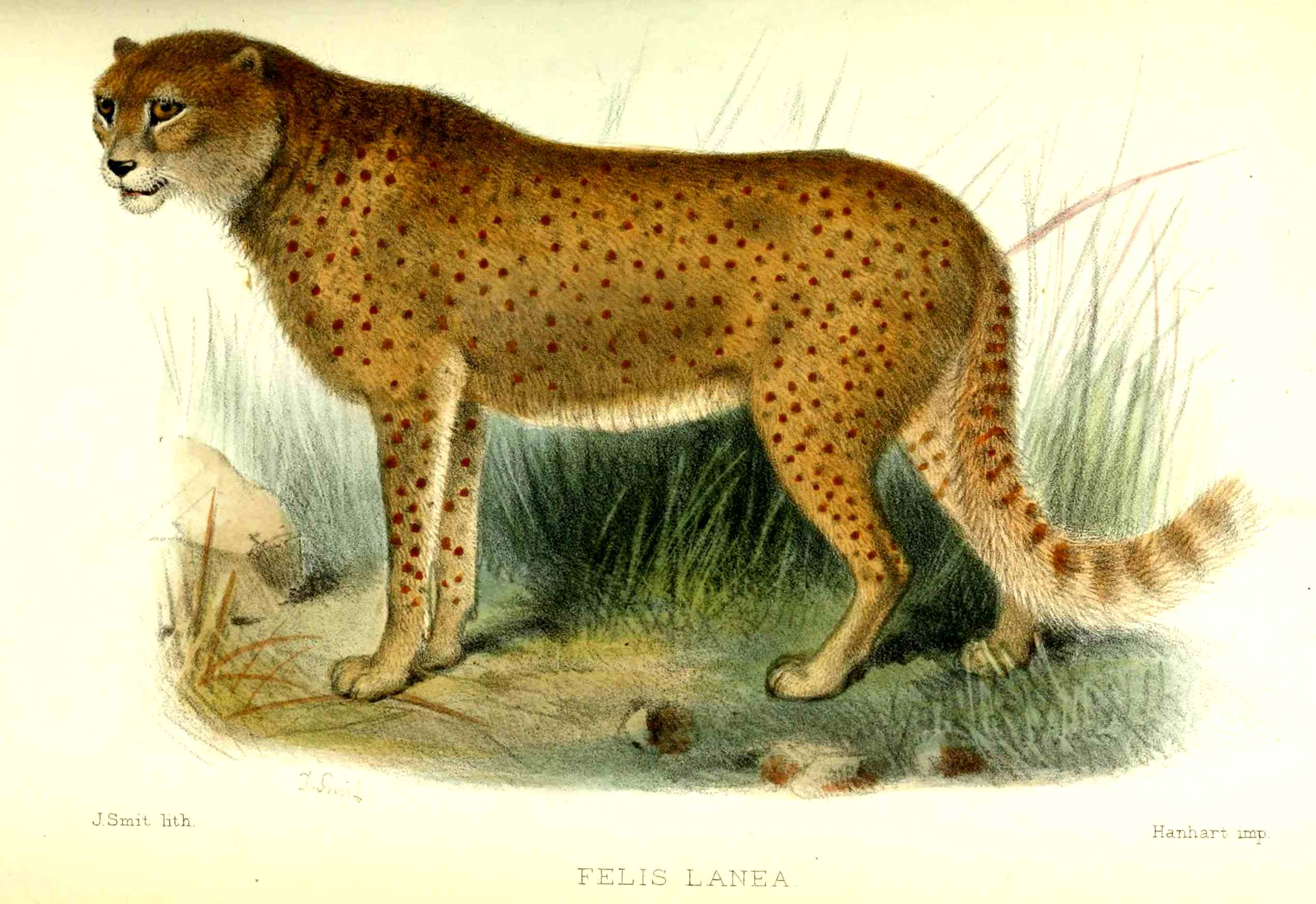
An illustration of the "woolly cheetah" (described as Felis lanea) from the Proceedings of the Zoological Society of London (1877)

In 1777, Johann Christian Daniel von Schreber described the cheetah based on a skin from the Cape of Good Hope and gave it the scientific name Felis jubatus. The specific epithet jubatus is Latin for 'crested, having a mane'.

Joshua Brookes proposed the generic name Acinonyx in 1828. In 1917, Reginald Innes Pocock placed the cheetah in a subfamily of its own, Acinonychinae, given its striking morphological resemblance to the greyhound and significant deviation from typical felid features. Several other proposed generic names such as Cynailurus and Cynofelis also allude to the similarities between the cheetah and canids. The cheetah was classified in Felinae in later taxonomic revisions.

In the 19th and 20th centuries, several cheetah zoological specimens were described; some were proposed as subspecies. A South African specimen with notably dense fur was proposed as Felis lanea by Philip Sclater in 1877 and became known as the "woolly cheetah". Its classification as a species was mostly disputed. There has been considerable confusion in the nomenclature of the cheetah and leopard (Panthera pardus) as authors often confused the two; some considered "hunting leopards" an independent species, or equal to the leopard.

=== Subspecies ===
In 1975, five cheetah subspecies were considered valid taxa: A. j. hecki, A. j. jubatus, A. j. raineyi, A. j. soemmeringii and A. j. venaticus. In 2011, a phylogeographic study found minimal genetic variation between A. j. jubatus and A. j. raineyi; only four subspecies were identified. In 2017, the Cat Classification Task Force of the IUCN Cat Specialist Group revised felid taxonomy and recognised these four subspecies as valid. Their details are tabulated below:

Subspecies	Details	Image	Range map
Southeast African cheetah (A. j. jubatus) (Schreber, 1775) syn. A. j. raineyi Heller, 1913	The nominate subspecies; it genetically diverged from the Asiatic cheetah 67,000–32,000 years ago. As of 2016, the largest population of nearly 4,000 individuals is sparsely distributed in Angola, Botswana, Kenya, Mozambique, Namibia, South Africa, Tanzania, Zimbabwe, and Zambia.	Southeast African cheetah in Masai Mara, Kenya	
Asiatic cheetah (A. j. venaticus) Griffith, 1821	This subspecies is confined to central Iran, and is the only surviving cheetah population in Asia. As of 2022, only 12 individuals were estimated to survive in Iran, nine of which are males and three of which are females.		
Northeast African cheetah (A. j. soemmeringii) Fitzinger, 1855	This subspecies occurs in the northern Central African Republic, Chad, Ethiopia and South Sudan in small and heavily fragmented populations; in 2016, the largest population of 238 individuals occurred in the northern CAR and southeastern Chad. It diverged genetically from the southeast African cheetah 72,000–16,000 years ago.	Northeast African cheetah resting on the ground in Djibouti City, Djibouti	
Northwest African cheetah (A. j. hecki) Hilzheimer, 1913	This subspecies occurs in Algeria, Benin, Burkina Faso, Mali and Niger. In 2016, the largest population of 191 individuals occurred in Adrar des Ifoghas, Ahaggar and Tassili n'Ajjer in south-central Algeria and northeastern Mali. It is listed as critically endangered on the IUCN Red List.	Northwest African cheetah resting on the ground in Idlès, Algeria	

== Phylogeny and evolution ==
- - - - Lynx lineage
        Lynx
    - - - Puma lineage
          - Acinonyx
            Cheetah
          - - Puma
              Cougar P. concolor
            - Herpailurus
              Jaguarundi H. yagouaroundi
      - - Domestic cat lineage
          Felis
        - Leopard cat lineage
          - Otocolobus
          - Prionailurus

The Puma lineage of the family Felidae, depicted along with closely related genera

The cheetah's closest relatives are the cougar (Puma concolor) and the jaguarundi (Herpailurus yagouaroundi). Together, these three species form the Puma lineage, one of the eight lineages of the extant felids; the Puma lineage genetically diverged from the rest 6.7 million years ago. The sister group of the Puma lineage is a clade of smaller Old World cats that includes the genera Felis, Otocolobus and Prionailurus.

The oldest fossils of Acinonyx, excavated in eastern and southern Africa, date to 3.5 to 3 million years ago; the earliest known specimen from South Africa is from the lowermost deposits of the Silberberg Grotto (Sterkfontein). Though incomplete, these fossils indicate forms larger but less cursorial than the modern cheetah. The first occurrence of the modern species A. jubatus in Africa may come from Cooper's D, a site in South Africa dating back to 1.5 to 1.4 million years ago, during the Calabrian stage. Cheetah-like cats are known from as late as 10,000 years ago from the Old World. The giant cheetah (A. pardinensis), significantly larger and slower compared to the modern cheetah, occurred in Eurasia and eastern and southern Africa in the Villafranchian period roughly 3.8 to 1.9 million years ago. In the Middle Pleistocene, a smaller species of Acinonyx, A. intermedius, also assigned to as a subspecies of A. pardinensis, ranged from Europe to China.

Miracinonyx, colloquially known as the American cheetah, was once regarded as a subgenus of Acinonyx by the American paleontologist Daniel B. Adams in 1979. He proposed that the cheetah originated from North America and migrated to Africa and Eurasia based on its proposed close relationship with Miracinonyx. In 1990, American paleontologist Blaire Van Valkenburgh and colleagues reassigned Miracinonyx as a distinct genus, and contended that the similarities between Miracinonyx and Acinonyx may have instead been a result of convergent evolution (independent evolution of analogous traits under similar environmental pressures). In 2026, American geneticist Molly Cassatt-Johnstone and colleagues examined the mitochondrial and nuclear genomes of M. trumani, and found that its closest living relative is the cougar.

The three species of the Puma lineage may have had a common ancestor during the Miocene, roughly 8.25 million years ago. Some suggest that North American cheetahs possibly migrated to Asia via the Bering Strait, then dispersed southward to Africa through Eurasia at least 100,000 years ago; other authors have expressed doubt over the occurrence of cheetah-like cats in North America, and instead suppose the modern cheetah to have evolved from Asian populations that eventually spread to Africa. The cheetah is thought to have experienced two population bottlenecks that greatly decreased the genetic variability in populations; one occurred about 100,000 years ago that has been correlated to migration from North America to Asia, and the second 10,000–12,000 years ago in Africa, possibly as part of the Late Pleistocene extinction event.

== Genetics ==
The diploid number of chromosomes in the cheetah is 38, the same as in most other felids. The cheetah was the first felid observed to have unusually low genetic variability among individuals, which has led to poor breeding in captivity, increased spermatozoal defects, high juvenile mortality and increased susceptibility to diseases and infections. A prominent instance was the deadly feline coronavirus outbreak in the cheetah breeding facility at Wildlife Safari in Winston, Oregon in 1983 which had a mortality rate of 60%, higher than that recorded for previous epizootics of feline infectious peritonitis in any felid. The remarkable homogeneity in cheetah genes has been demonstrated by experiments involving the major histocompatibility complex (MHC); unless the MHC genes are highly homogeneous in a population, skin grafts exchanged between a pair of unrelated individuals would be rejected. Skin grafts exchanged between unrelated cheetahs are accepted well and heal, as if their genetic makeup were the same.

The low genetic diversity is thought to have been created by two population bottlenecks from about 100,000 years and about 12,000 years ago, respectively. The resultant level of genetic variation is around 0.1–4% of average living species, lower than that of Tasmanian devils, Virunga gorillas, Amur tigers, and even highly inbred domestic cats and dogs.

=== King cheetah ===
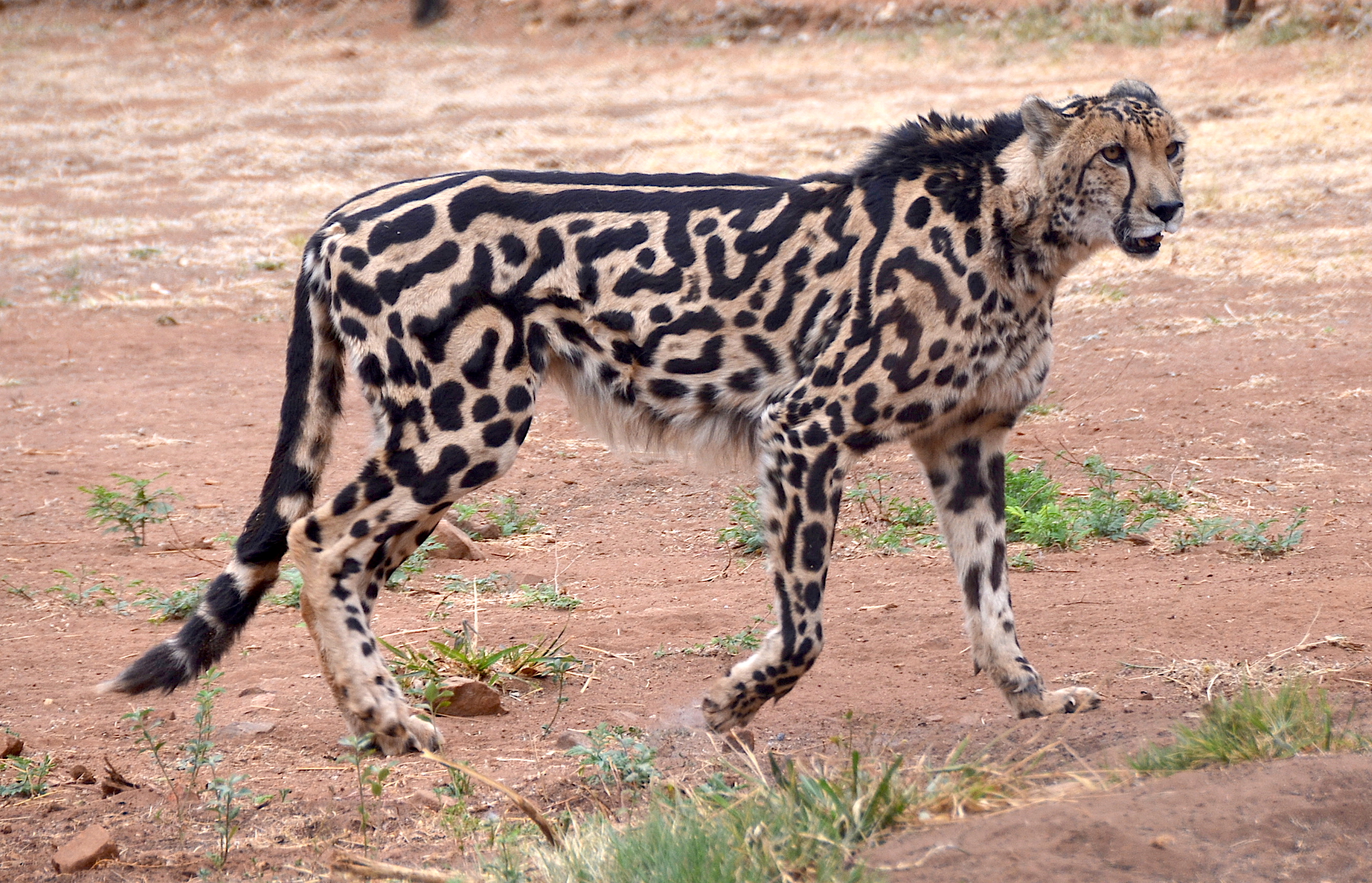
King cheetah

The king cheetah has large, blotchy spots and three dark, wide stripes extending from the neck to the tail; it is a rare mutation. In Manicaland, Zimbabwe, it was known as nsuifisi and thought to be a cross between a leopard and a hyena. In 1926, a cheetah-like animal was shot near Harare, which according to the hunter's lore had thick fur like a snow leopard and spots that merged to form stripes; he therefore suggested that it could have been a cross between a leopard and a cheetah. More similar individuals were observed that had non-retractile claws like the cheetah.

In 1927, Pocock described these individuals as a new species by the name of Acinonyx rex ("king cheetah"). However, in the absence of proof to support his claim, he withdrew his proposal in 1939. Abel Chapman considered it a colour morph of the normally spotted cheetah. Since 1927, the king cheetah has been reported five more times in the wild in Zimbabwe, Botswana and northern Transvaal Province; one was photographed in 1975.

In 1981, two female cheetahs that had mated with a wild male from Transvaal at the De Wildt Cheetah and Wildlife Centre gave birth to one king cheetah each; subsequently, more king cheetahs were born at the centre. In 2012, the cause of this coat pattern was found to be a mutation in the gene for transmembrane aminopeptidase (Taqpep), the same gene responsible for the striped "mackerel" versus blotchy "classic" pattern seen in tabby cats. The appearance is caused by reinforcement of a recessive allele; hence if two mating cheetahs are heterozygous genetic carriers of the mutated allele, a quarter of their offspring can be expected to be king cheetahs.

== Characteristics ==
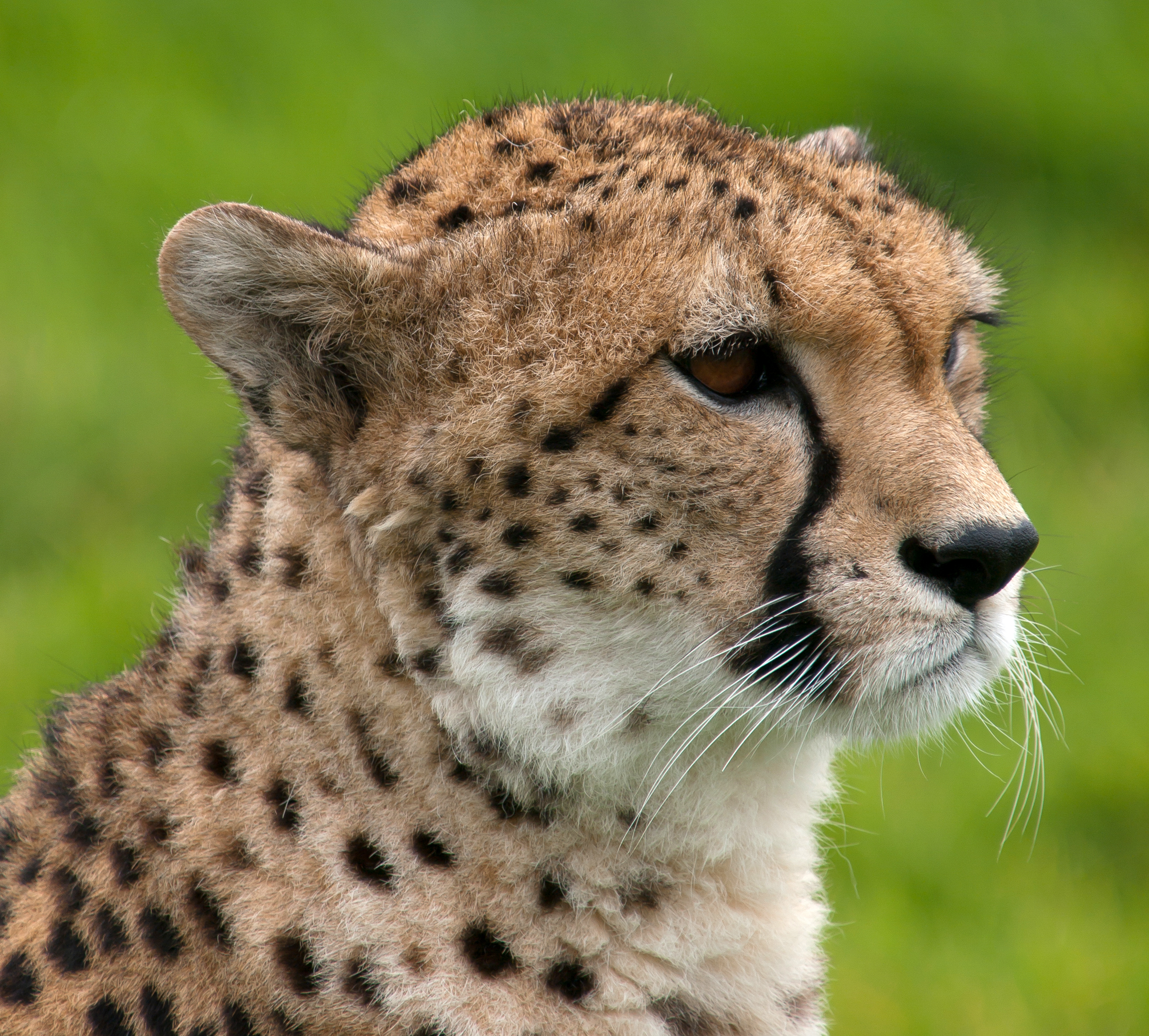
Cheetah portrait showing black "tear marks" running from the corners of the eyes down the side of the nose

The cheetah is a slim-bodied, spotted cat characterised by a small, streamlined head, a short snout, black tear-like facial streaks, a deep chest, long limbs and a long tail. Its slim, canid-like form is highly adapted for running, and contrasts sharply with the bulky body of the Panthera genus members and cougars. Cheetahs typically reach 67–94 cm (2.20–3.08 ft) at the shoulder and the head-and-body length is between 1.1 and 1.5 m (3 ft 7 in and 4 ft 11 in). The weight can vary with age, health, location, sex and subspecies; adults typically range between 21 and 65 kg (46 and 143 lb). Cubs born in the wild weigh 150–300 g (5.3–10.6 oz) at birth, while those born in captivity tend to be larger and weigh around 500 g (18 oz). The cheetah is sexually dimorphic; females are smaller than males in average. Studies differ significantly on morphological variations among the subspecies.

The cheetah's coat is typically tawny to creamy white or pale buff, but darker in the mid-back portion. The chin, throat and underparts of the legs and the belly are white and devoid of markings. The rest of the body is covered with around 2,000 evenly spaced, oval or round solid black spots, each measuring roughly 3–5 cm (1.2–2.0 in). Each cheetah has a distinct pattern of spots which can be used to identify unique individuals. Besides the clearly visible spots, there are other faint, irregular black marks on the coat. Newly born cubs are covered in fur with an unclear pattern of spots that gives them a dark appearance—pale white above and nearly black on the underside. The hair is mostly short and often coarse, but the chest and the belly are covered in soft fur; the fur of king cheetahs has been reported to be silky. There is a short, rough mane, covering at least 8 cm (3.1 in) along the neck and the shoulders; this feature is more prominent in males. The mane starts out as a cape of long, loose blue to grey hair in juveniles. Melanistic cheetahs are rare and have been seen in Zambia and Zimbabwe. In 1877–1878, two partially albino specimens from South Africa were described. A tabby cheetah was photographed in Kenya in 2012.

Saharan cheetahs have canid-like slim faces. The ears are small, short and rounded; they are tawny at the base and on the edges and marked with black patches on the back. The eyes are set high and have round pupils. The pronounced tear streaks are unique to the cheetah and originate from the corners of the eyes and run down the nose to the mouth. The role of these streaks is not well understood, they may protect the eyes from the sun's glare or could be used to define facial expressions. The whiskers, shorter and fewer than those of other felids, are fine and inconspicuous. The long tail, with a bushy white tuft at the end, measures 60–80 cm (24–31 in). While the first two-thirds of the tail are covered in spots, the final third is marked with four to six dark rings or stripes.

Although similar at first glance, the leopard has rosettes instead of spots and does not have tear streaks. The serval also resembles the cheetah, but its spots fuse to form stripes on the back.

=== Internal anatomy ===
Cheetah anatomy

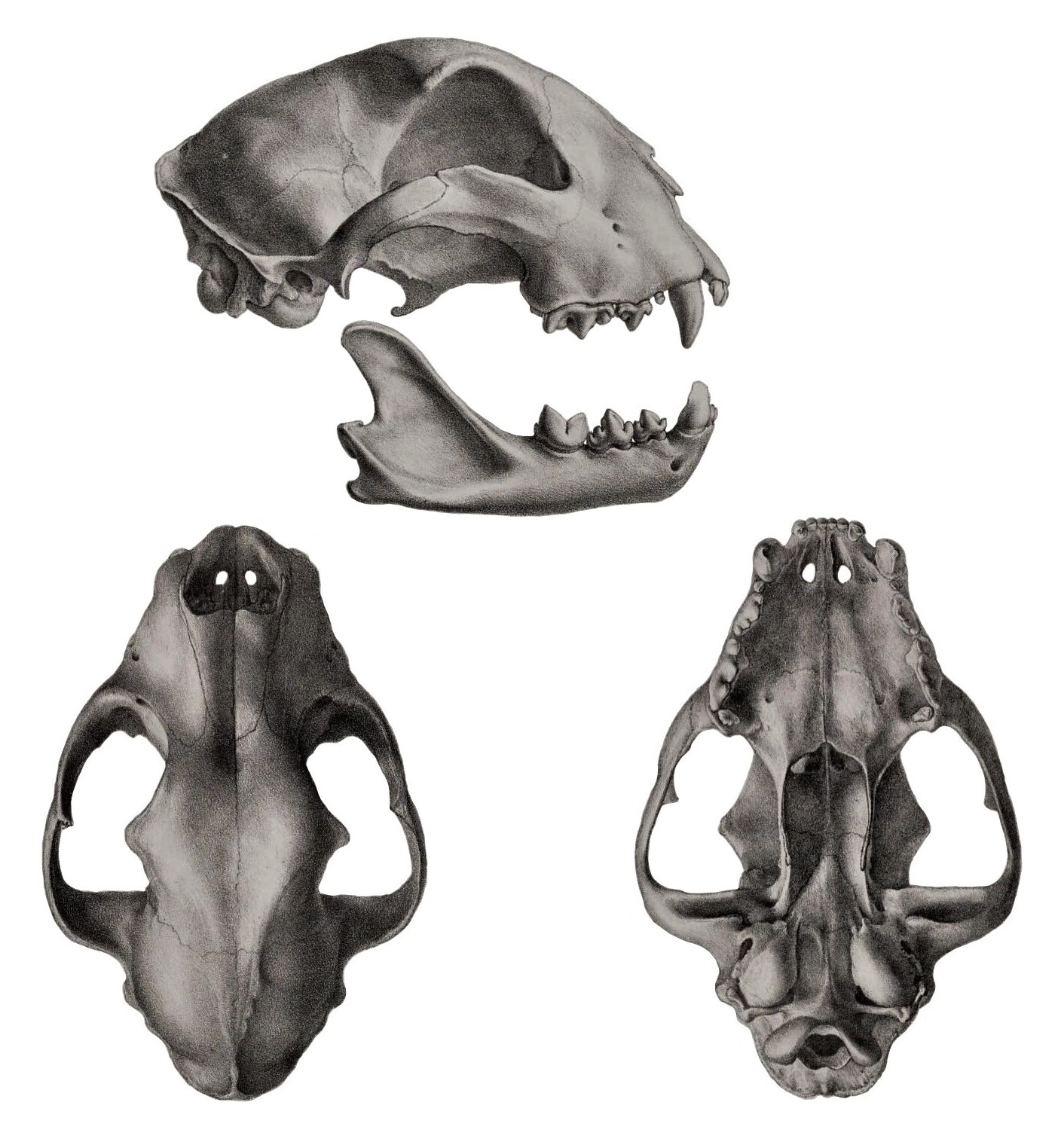
Cheetah skull

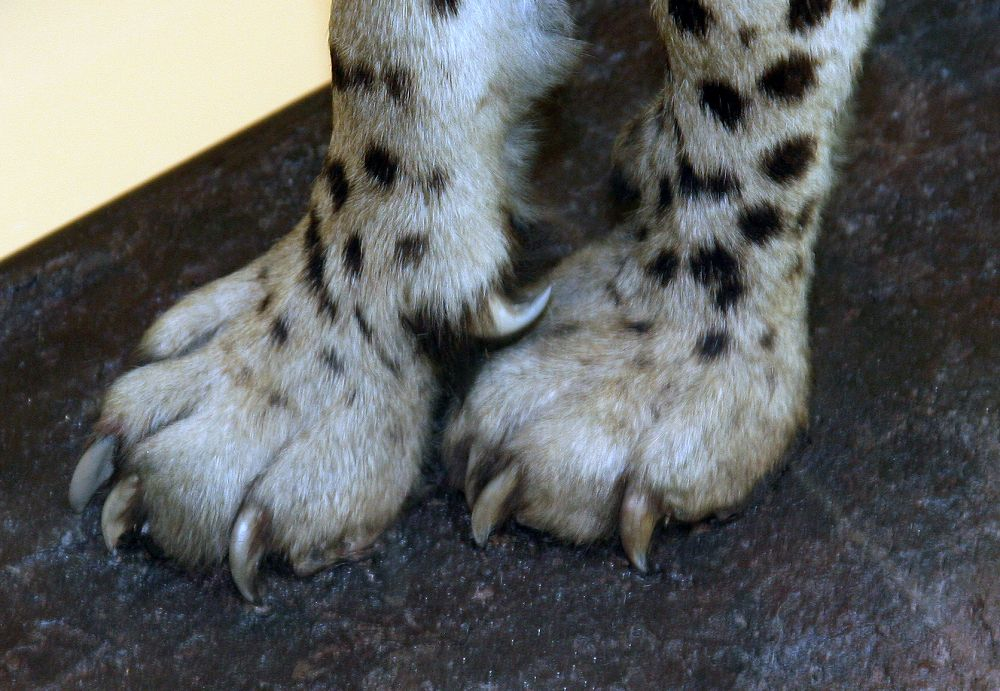
The blunt claws and the sharp, curved dewclaw

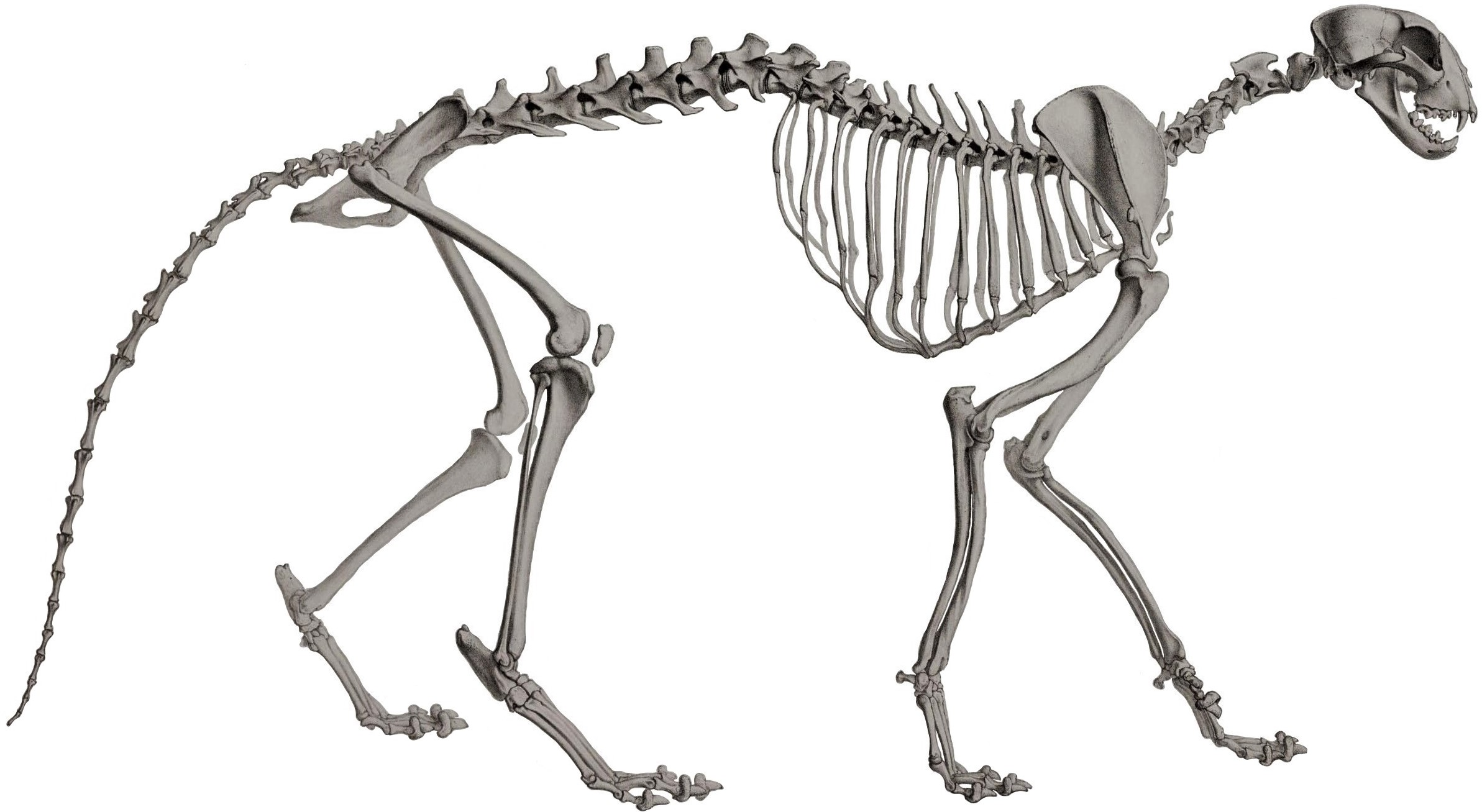
Cheetah skeleton

The cheetah has a physiology specialised for sprinting; its thigh muscles are 50% heavier than predicted for quadrupedal mammals of the same body mass, while those of a lion or tiger closes to what is predicted for their body mass. It has a concentration of type IIx muscle fibers of 50.1% in the hindlimbs, 40% in the neck and trunk, and 36% in the forelimbs. Betz cells in primary motor cortex are exceptionally large for its brain mass and would be to innervate more type IIx muscle fibers and larger locomotor muscles. The cheetah cannot utilise oxygen at the same level as other mammals; its mitochondrial volume represents only 3.7% of the total volume of the muscle fibers, compared to 6.5–10.7% in dogs and ponies.

The cheetah has the largest frontal sinuses among felids, which may help it to cool the air that it breathes. The average temperature of a few cheetahs measured after hunts is 38.6 °C (101.5 °F), suggesting that intense physical activity does not cause overheating.

The slightly curved claws are shorter and straighter than those of other cats, lack a protective sheath and are partly retractile. The limited retraction of claws may result from the earlier truncation of the development of the cheetah's middle phalanx bone. The claws are blunt due to lack of protection. But the large and strongly curved dewclaw is sharp. It has larger elbow extensor muscles than those of a brown bear of their same size.

The extension of its stride comes mainly from the flexion of the spine before the feet strike the ground during air suspension phases. Its flexed trunk length represents only 67% of its extended trunk length, compared to 80–90% of a horse. The cheetah lumbar region is the longest among carnivore mammals, accounting for half of the combined length of its spine's thoracic and lumbar regions.

The cheetah's tail does not serve as counterbalance, as it represents only 2% of its body mass, thereby not providing significant moment of inertia. The cheetah's tail serves as a rudder, as the thick fur increases its effective area by 40%, thereby increasing aerodynamic drag. The tail performs rotational movements that could reach angular velocities of 17–22 radians per second and angles of 90°.

The roughly triangular skull has light, narrow bones, and the sagittal crest is poorly developed, possibly to reduce weight and enhance speed. The mouth can not be opened as widely as in other cats given the shorter length of muscles between the jaw and the skull.

The cheetah has 30 teeth; the dental formula is 3.1.3.13.1.2.1. The small, conical canines are used to bite the throat and suffocate the prey. The cheetah jaws generate the highest bite force in canine teeth among felids at 689 Newtons, when all skulls are scaled to the same surface area of 1.42×10^{5} mm^{2} and all muscles generate the same force of 871 Newtons; cheetah jaws can distribute the mechanical stress efficiently. Its canines have no diastema behind them when the jaws close, as the top and bottom cheek teeth show extensive overlap. The cheetah has relatively elongated and blade-like shape carnassial teeth, with reduced lingual cusps, which is thought to be an adaptation to quickly consume the flesh of prey before larger predators arrive.

=== Speed and acceleration ===
Documentary video filmed at 1200 frames per second showing the movement of Sarah, the fastest recorded cheetah, over a set run

The cheetah is the fastest land animal, capable of overtaking pronghorns and fast antelopes, even when they have a 137 m (449 ft) head start. Cheetahs can easily outrun greyhounds in a race. A popular figure of 114 km/h (71 mph) has been discredited due to a faulty measurement method. The highest reliably reported running speed is 104 km/h (65 mph). A speed of 100.1 km/h (62.2 mph) also has been reliably reported. An 11 year old cheetah from the Cincinnati Zoo was measured at a speed of 98 km/h (61 mph).

Cheetahs equipped with GPS collars hunted at speeds lower than the highest speeds attained; the average running speed recorded during hunts was 54 km/h (34 mph), while the highest speed recorded was 93 km/h (58 mph). The cheetah uses its maximum running speed only to close the distance with the prey in a straight line, then it follows closely during 3–4 twists in zigzag that the prey makes trying to escape. The speeds of more than 100 km/h (62 mph) attained by the cheetah are greater than those achieved typically by the pronghorn and fast antelopes at 80 km/h (50 mph). But the cheetah has an exceptional acceleration, from 0 to 97 km/h (0 to 60 mph) in less than 3 seconds. For comparison, polo horses can go from 0 to 36 km/h (0 to 22 mph) in 3.6 seconds.

One stride of a galloping cheetah measures 4 to 7 m (13 to 23 ft); the stride length and the number of jumps increases with speed. The movements of the vertebral column can add as much as 76 cm (2.49 ft) to the stride length. It has been estimated that a cheetah at full speed could take 4 strides per second. During more than half the duration of the sprint, the cheetah has all four limbs in the air, increasing the stride length.

== Distribution and habitat ==
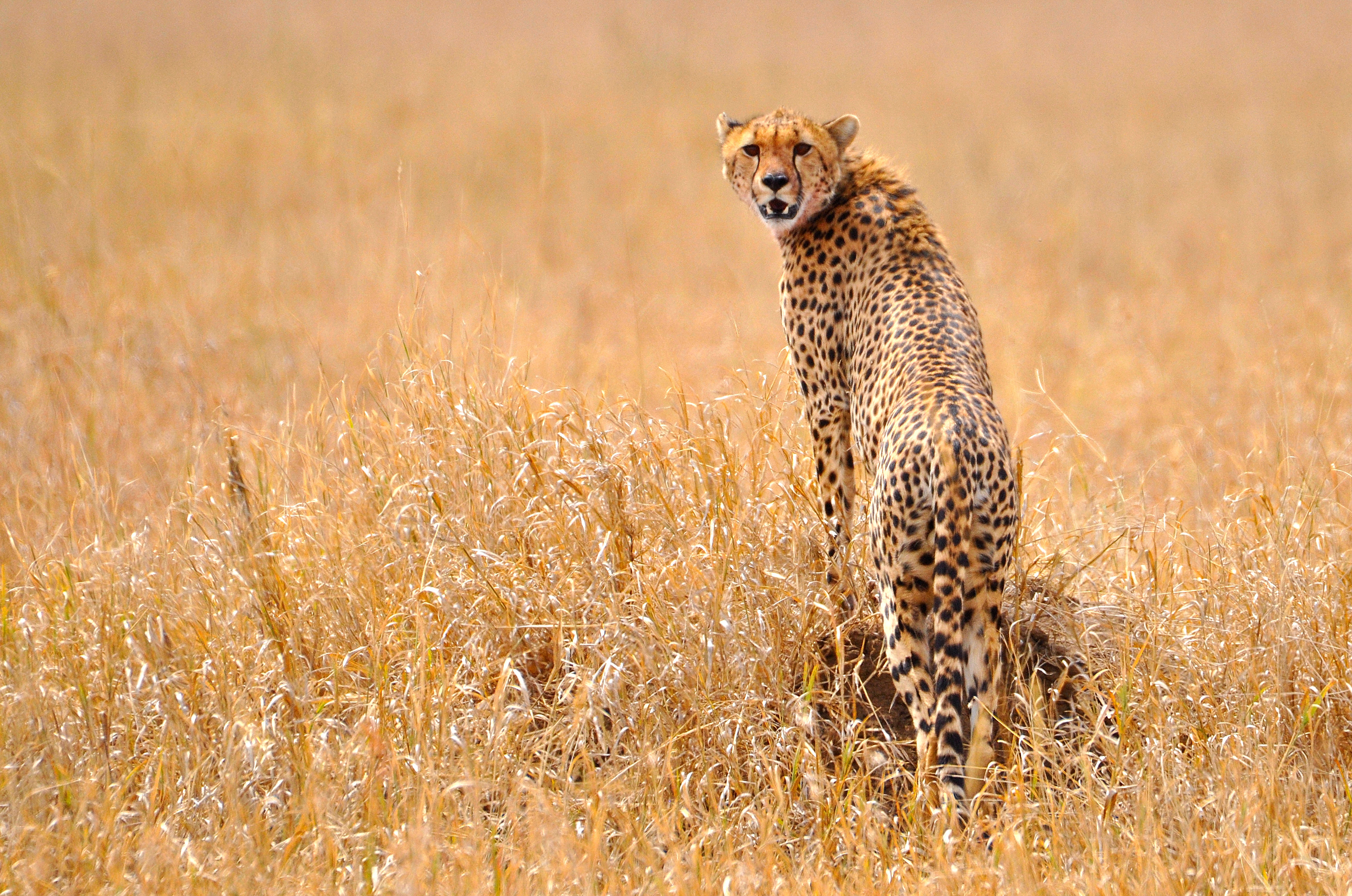
A cheetah standing on a rock in the grasslands of the Serengeti

In eastern and southern Africa, the cheetah occurs mostly in savannas like the Kalahari and Serengeti. In central, northern and western Africa, it inhabits arid mountain ranges and valleys; in the harsh climate of the Sahara, it prefers high mountains, which receive more rainfall than the surrounding desert. The vegetation and water resources in these mountains support antelopes. In Iran, it occurs in hilly terrain of deserts at elevations up to 2,000–3,000 m (6,600–9,800 ft), where annual precipitation is generally below 100 mm (3.9 in); the primary vegetation in these areas is thinly distributed shrubs, less than 1 m (3 ft 3 in) tall.

The cheetah inhabits a variety of ecosystems and appears to be less selective in habitat choice than other felids; it prefers areas with greater availability of prey, good visibility and minimal chances of encountering larger predators. It seldom occurs in tropical forests. It has been reported at the elevation of 4,000 m (13,000 ft). An open area with some cover, such as diffused bushes, is probably ideal for the cheetah because it needs to stalk and pursue its prey over a distance. This also minimises the risk of encountering larger carnivores. The cheetah tends to occur in low densities typically between 0.3 and 3.0 adults per 100 km^{2} (39 sq mi); these values are 10–30% of those reported for leopards and lions.

=== Historical range ===
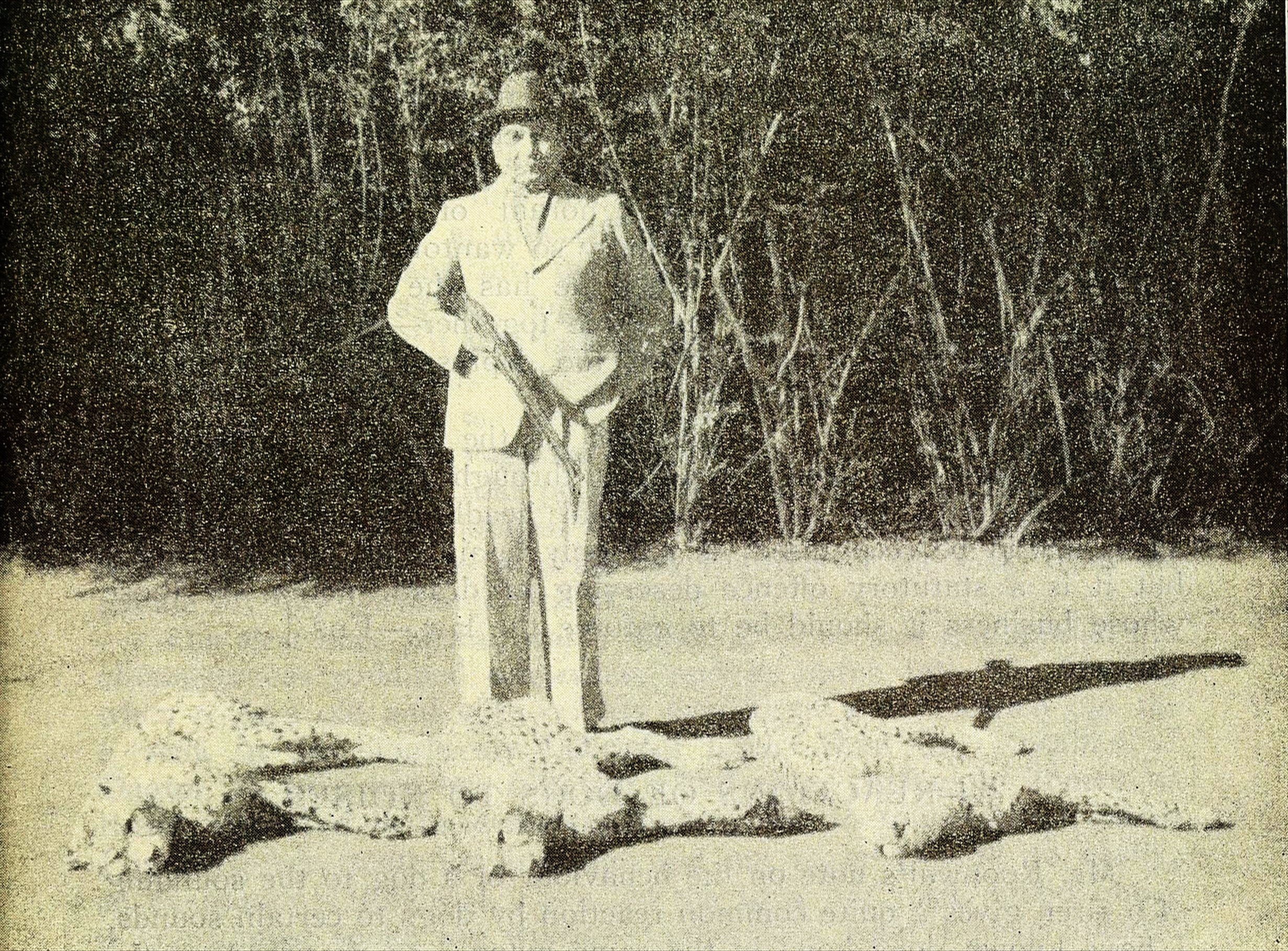
Three of the last wild cheetahs in India were shot in 1947 by Maharaja Ramanuj Pratap Singh Deo of Surguja.

In prehistoric times, the cheetah was distributed throughout Africa, Western and Central Asia. Today the cheetah has been extirpated in most of its historical range; the numbers of the Asiatic cheetah had begun plummeting since the late 1800s, long before the other subspecies started their decline. As of 2017, cheetahs occur in just nine per cent of their erstwhile range in Africa, mostly in unprotected areas. Until the mid-20th century, the cheetah ranged across vast stretches in Asia, from the Arabian Peninsula in the west to the Indian subcontinent in the east, and as far north as the Aral and Caspian Seas. A few centuries ago the cheetah was abundant in India, and its range coincided with the distribution of major prey like the blackbuck. However, its numbers in India plummeted from the 19th century onward; the last three wild individuals were killed by Maharaja Ramanuj Pratap Singh of Surguja in 1947. The last confirmed sighting in India was of a cheetah that drowned in a well near Hyderabad in 1957.

The cheetah's range in the Soviet Union encompassed the "desert plains of Middle Asia and southern Kazakhstan and the eastern Trans-Caucasus". During the Middle Ages, the cheetah ranged as far as western Georgia and probably survived in the Kura-Aras lowland and central Aras River valley until the 18th century, though it went extinct in the region following the decline of goitered gazelles and due to human persecution. By the mid-20th century, the cheetah was reportedly "still quite extensively if sparsely distributed throughout the region west of the Amu Darya and Aral Sea, but has been vanishing very rapidly".

In Iraq, cheetahs were reported from Basra in the 1920s. In Iran there were around 400 cheetahs before World War II, distributed across deserts and steppes to the east and the borderlands with Iraq to the west; the numbers were falling because of a decline in prey. Conservation efforts in the 1950s stabilised the population, but prey species declined again in the wake of the Iranian Revolution after 1979 and the Iran–Iraq War, leading to a significant contraction of the cheetah's historical range in the region.

In 1975, the cheetah population was estimated at 15,000 individuals throughout Sub-Saharan Africa, following the first survey in this region by Norman Myers. The range covered most of eastern and southern Africa, except for the desert region on the western coast of modern-day Angola and Namibia. In the following years, cheetah populations across the region have become smaller and more fragmented as the natural habitat has been modified significantly. Cheetah mummies dating back to 4223–127 YBP have been found in a cave system in Saudi Arabia.

=== Present distribution ===
The cheetah occurs mostly in eastern and southern Africa; its presence in Asia is limited to the central deserts of Iran, though there have been unconfirmed reports of sightings in Afghanistan, Iraq and Pakistan in the last few decades. The global population of cheetahs was estimated at nearly 7,100 mature individuals in 2016. The Iranian population appears to have decreased from 60 to 100 individuals in 2007 to 43 in 2016, distributed in three subpopulations over less than 150,000 km^{2} (58,000 sq mi) in Iran's central plateau. The largest population of nearly 4,000 individuals is sparsely distributed over Angola, Botswana, Mozambique, Namibia, South Africa and Zambia. Another population in Kenya and Tanzania comprises about 1,000 individuals. All other cheetahs occur in small, fragmented groups of less than 100 individuals each. Populations are thought to be declining.

== Behaviour and ecology ==
=== Communication ===
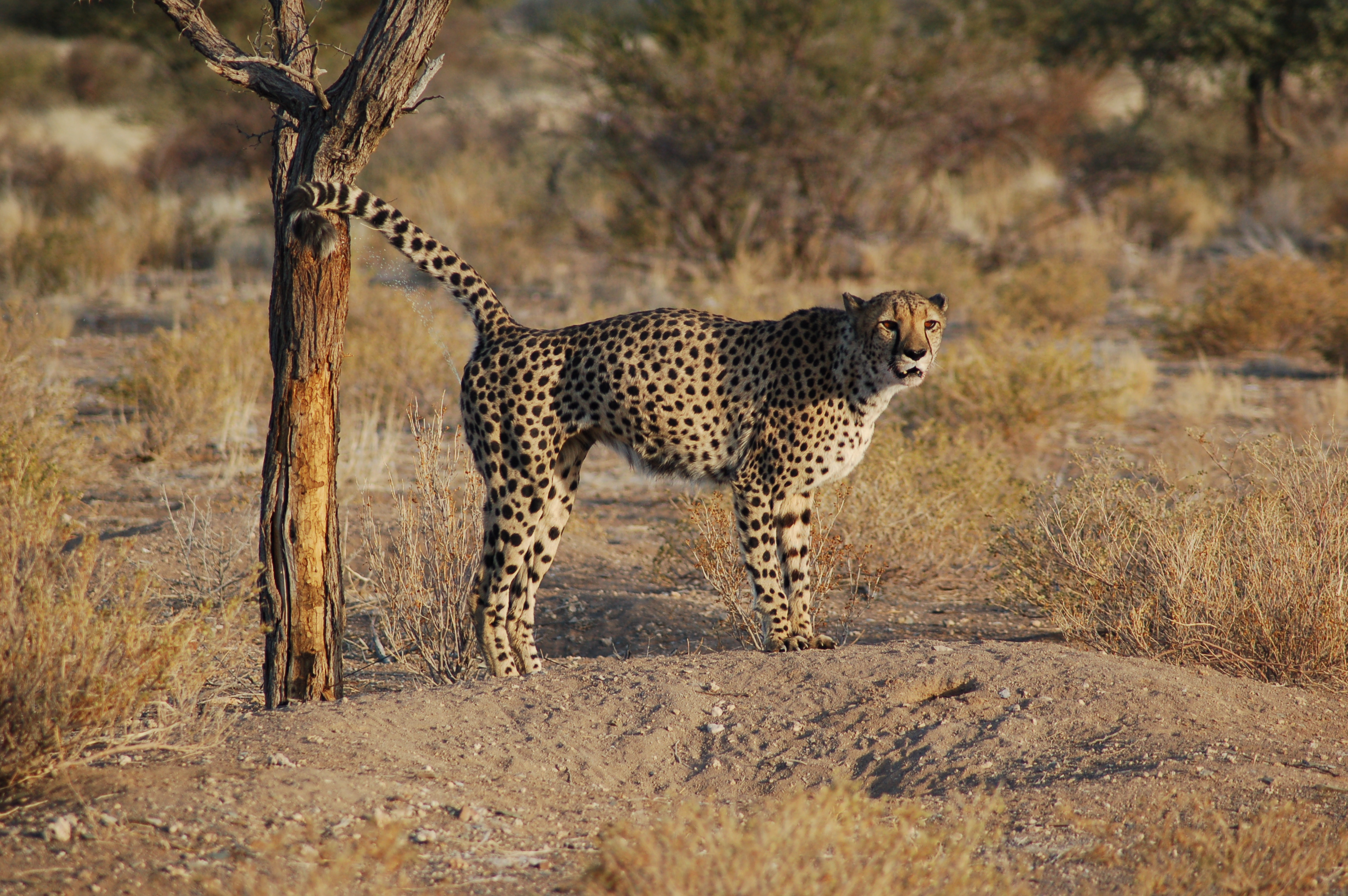
Male scent marking his territory

Calls of cheetahs: purr, hiss, growl, churr, meow, chirp, howl

The cheetah is a vocal cat with a broad repertoire of calls and sounds; the acoustic features and the use of many of these have been studied in detail. The way vocalisations are produced have some differences compared to the domestic cat, such as cheetah exhalations are louder. Listed below are some commonly recorded vocalisations observed in cheetahs:

- Chirping: A chirp (or a "stutter-bark") is an intense bird-like call and lasts less than a second. Cheetahs chirp when they are excited, for instance, when gathered around a kill. Other uses include summoning concealed or lost cubs by the mother, or as a greeting or courtship between adults. The cheetah's chirp is similar to the soft roar of the lion, and its churr as the latter's loud roar. A similar but louder call ('yelp') can be heard from up to 2 km (1.2 mi) away; this call is typically used by mothers to locate lost cubs, or by cubs to find their mothers and siblings.
- Churring or churtling: A churr is a shrill, staccato call that can last up to two seconds. Churring and chirping have been noted for their similarity to the soft and loud roars of the lion. It is produced in similar context as chirping, but a study of feeding cheetahs found chirping to be much more common.
- Purring: Similar to purring in domestic cats but much louder, it is produced when the cheetah is content, and as a form of greeting or when licking one another. It involves continuous sound production alternating between egressive and ingressive airstreams.
- Agonistic sounds: These include bleating, coughing, growling, hissing, meowing and moaning (or yowling). A bleat indicates distress, for instance when a cheetah confronts a predator that has stolen its kill. Growls, hisses and moans are accompanied by multiple, strong hits on the ground with the front paw, during which the cheetah may retreat by a few metres. A meow, though a versatile call, is typically associated with discomfort or irritation.
- Other vocalisations: Individuals can make a gurgling noise as part of a close, amicable interaction. A "nyam nyam" sound may be produced while eating. Apart from chirping, mothers can use a repeated "ihn ihn" is to gather cubs, and a "prr prr" is to guide them on a journey. A low-pitched alarm call is used to warn the cubs to stand still. Bickering cubs can let out a "whirr"—the pitch rises with the intensity of the quarrel and ends on a harsh note.

Another major means of communication is by scent; the male often raises his tail and spray urine on elevated landmarks such as a tree trunks, stumps or rocks; other cheetahs sniff these landmarks and repeat the ritual. Females also show marking behaviour but less prominently than males. Females in oestrus show maximum urine-marking, and their excrement can attract males from far off. In Botswana, cheetahs are frequently captured by ranchers to protect livestock by setting up traps in traditional marking spots; the calls of the trapped cheetah can attract more cheetahs to the place. Camera traps at scent-marking sites in north-central Namibia documented that cheetahs defecate on marking sites much more frequently than leopards. Touch and visual cues are other ways of signalling, and social meetings involve mutual sniffing of the mouth, anus and genitals. Individuals groom one another, lick each other's faces and rub cheeks. However, they seldom lean on or rub their flanks against each other. The tear streaks on the face can sharply define expressions at close range. Mothers probably use the alternate light and dark rings on the tail to signal their cubs to follow them.

=== Social organisation ===
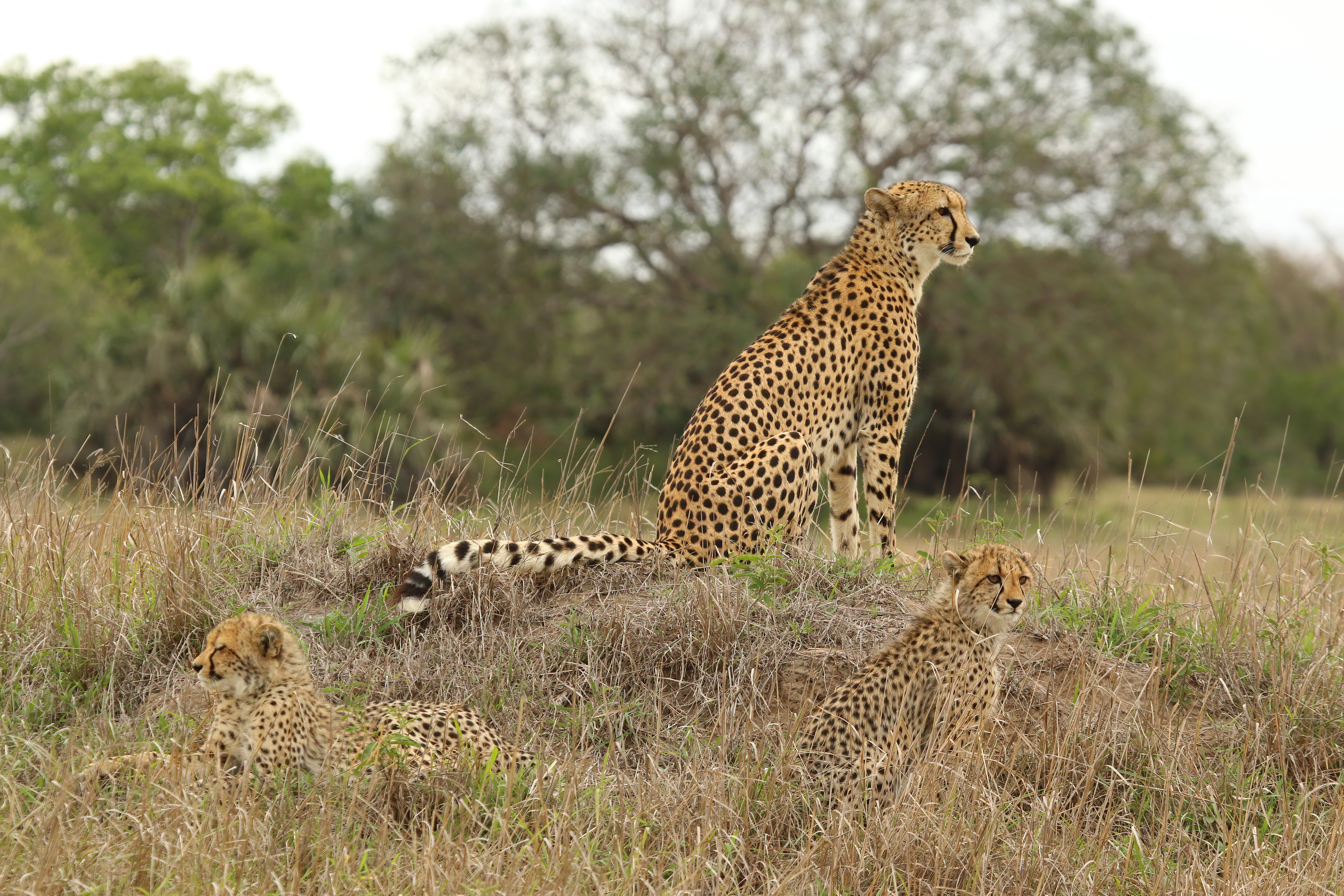
Female with her cubs in Phinda Private Game Reserve

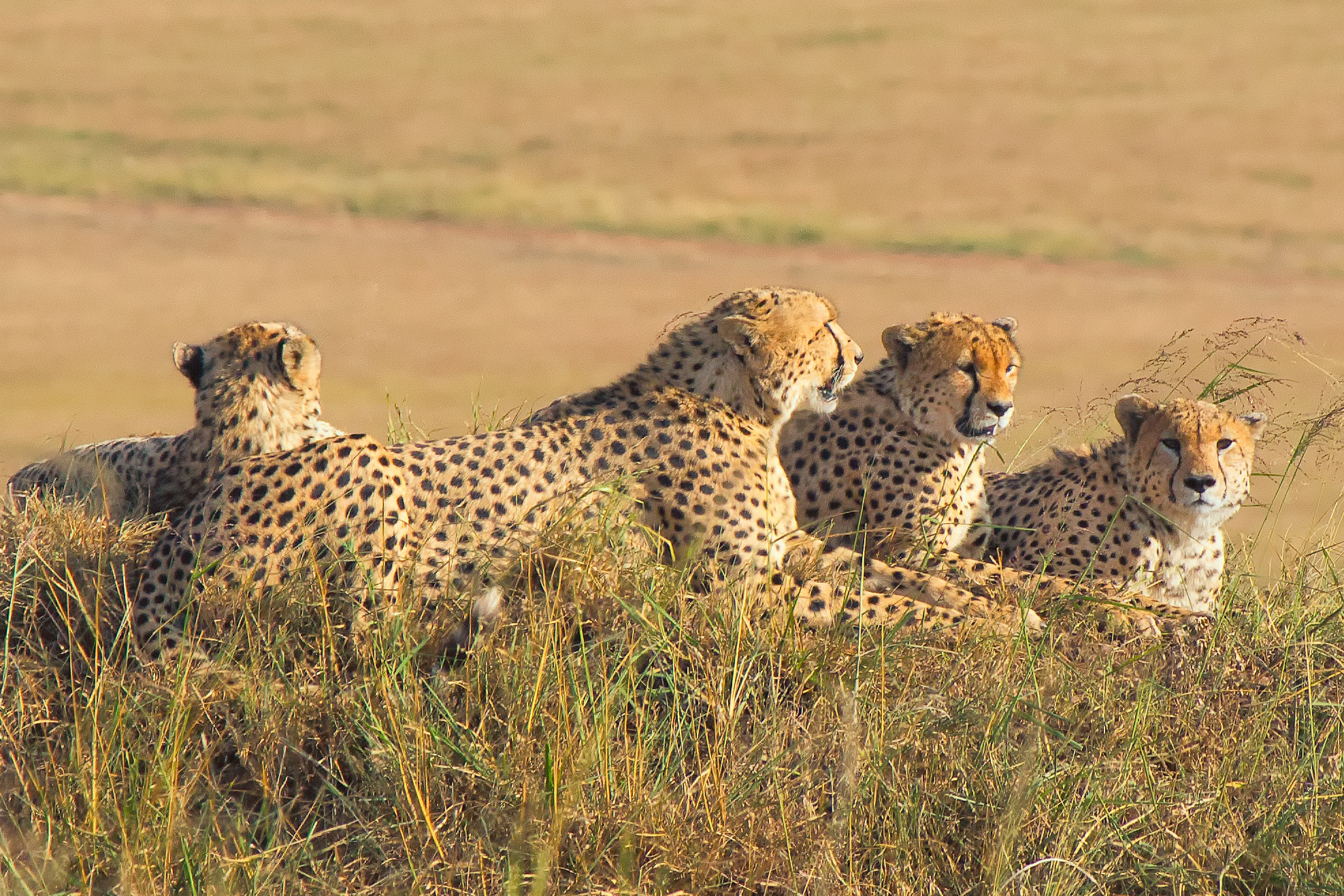
A group of males in Maasai Mara

The cheetah has a flexible and complex social structure and tends to be more gregarious than other cat species. Individuals typically avoid one another but are generally amicable; males may fight over territories or access to females in oestrus, and on rare occasions such fights can result in severe injury and death. Females are not social and have minimal interaction with other individuals, barring the interaction with males when they enter their territories or during the mating season. Some females, generally mother and offspring or siblings, may rest beside one another during the day. Females tend to lead a solitary life or live with offspring in undefended home ranges; young females often stay close to their mothers for life but young males leave their mother's range to live elsewhere. Some males are territorial, and group together for life, forming coalitions that collectively defend a territory which ensures maximum access to females—this is unlike the behaviour of the male lion who mates with a particular group (pride) of females. In most cases, a coalition will consist of brothers born in the same litter who stayed together after weaning, but biologically unrelated males are often allowed into the group; in the Serengeti, 30% of members in coalitions are unrelated males. If a cub is the only male in a litter, he will typically join an existing group, or form a small group of solitary males with two or three other lone males who may or may not be territorial. In the Kalahari Desert around 40% of the males live in solitude.

Males in a coalition are affectionate toward each other, grooming mutually and calling out if any member is lost; unrelated males may face some aversion in their initial days in the group. All males in the coalition typically have equal access to kills when the group hunts together, and possibly also to females who may enter their territory. A coalition generally has a greater chance of encountering and acquiring females for mating; however, its large membership demands greater resources than do solitary males. A 1987 study showed that solitary and grouped males have a nearly equal chance of coming across females, but the males in coalitions are notably healthier and have better chances of survival than their solitary counterparts. Male cheetahs seem to be more tolerant to cubs that are not their offspring than other felids, and supposed evidence of infanticide is considered circumstantial.

=== Activity pattern ===
The cheetah is mainly diurnal and most active from dawn until noon, with activity tapering off throughout the day and increasing briefly at dusk. Its diurnal tendency helps to avoid larger predators in areas where they are sympatric, such as in the Okavango Delta. However, daily variations in the temporal activity has been observed and correlate with temperature fluctuations; the cheetahs is more active at dusk during extreme temperatures. In areas where the cheetah is the major predator, its activity tends to increase at night, such as in farmlands in Botswana and Namibia, highly arid regions such as the Sahara, where daytime temperatures can reach 43 °C (109 °F). The lunar cycle can also influence the cheetah's routine, and activity increases on moonlit nights. Cheetah groups rest in grassy clearings after dusk, and often inspect their vicinity at observation points such as elevations to check for prey or larger carnivores; even while resting, they take turns at keeping a lookout.

=== Home range ===
Female cheetahs tend to use larger home ranges than males. Females typically disperse over large areas in pursuit of prey, but are less nomadic and roam in a smaller area if prey availability in the area is high. The size of their home range depends on the distribution of prey in a region. In central Namibia, where most prey species are sparsely distributed, home ranges are 554–7,063 km^{2} (214–2,727 sq mi), whereas home ranges in the woodlands of Phinda Game Reserve are 34–157 km^{2} (13–61 sq mi) in size. Cheetahs can travel long stretches overland in search of food; a study in the Kalahari Desert recorded an average displacement of nearly 11 km (6.8 mi) every day and walking speeds ranged between 2.5 and 3.8 km/h (1.6 and 2.4 mph).

Males are generally less nomadic than females; often males in coalitions and sometimes solitary males staying far from coalitions establish home ranges. Whether males settle in territories or disperse over large areas forming home ranges depends primarily on the movements of females. Territoriality is preferred only if females tend to be more sedentary, which is more feasible in areas with plenty of prey. Some males, called floaters, switch between territoriality and nomadism depending on the availability of females. A 1987 study showed territoriality depended on the size and age of males and the membership of the coalition. The ranges of floaters averaged 777 km^{2} (300 sq mi) in the Serengeti to 1,464 km^{2} (565 sq mi) in central Namibia. Territories in Kruger National Park were much smaller. A coalition of three males occupied a territory of 126 km^{2} (49 sq mi), and the territory of a solitary male measured 195 km^{2} (75 sq mi). When a female enters a territory, the males surround her; if she tries to escape, the males bite or snap at her. Generally, the female can not escape on her own; the males themselves leave after they lose interest in her. They may smell the spot she was sitting or lying on to determine if she was in oestrus.

=== Reproduction and life cycle ===
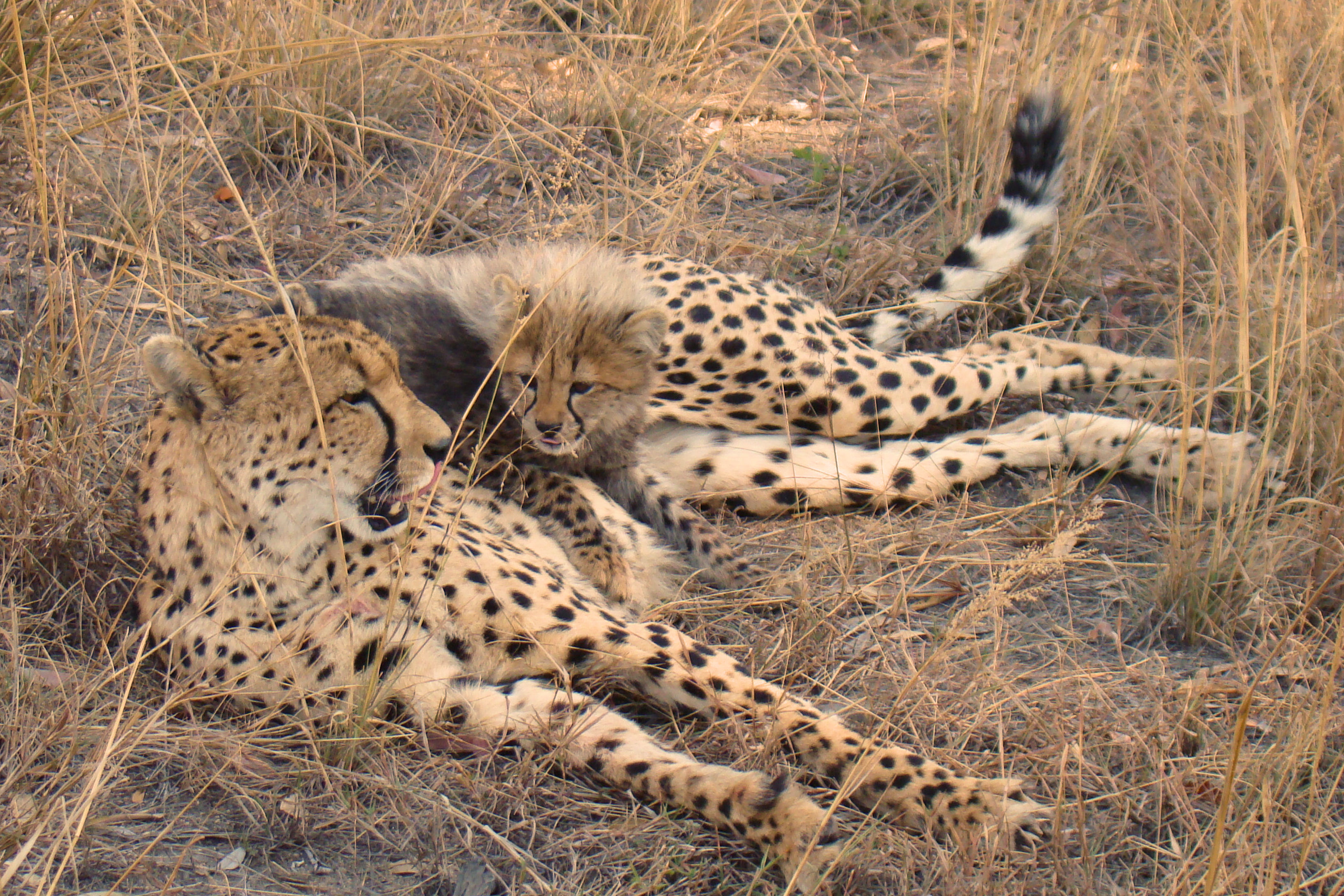
Cub with mother

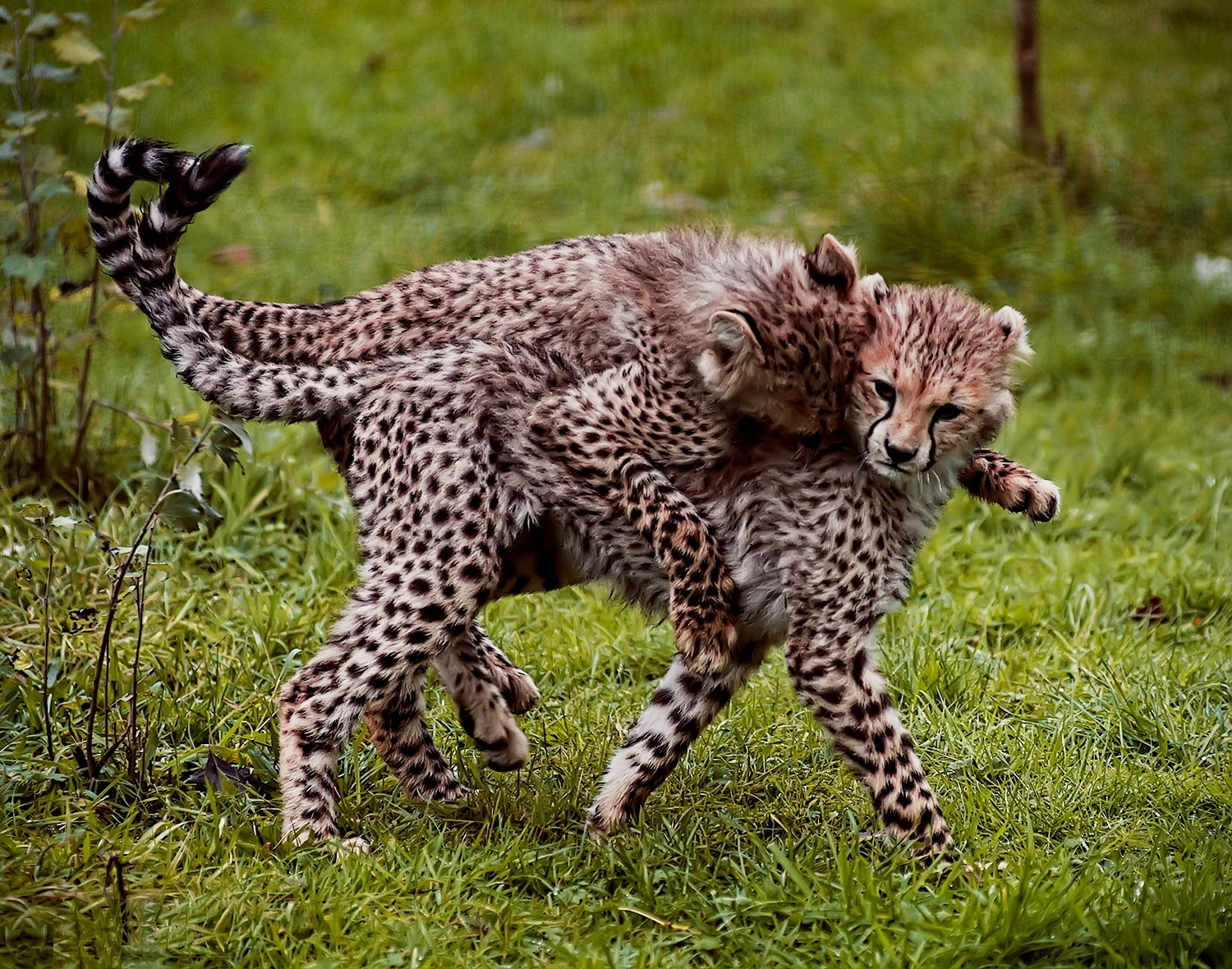
Two older cubs playing

The cheetah breeds throughout the year; females are polyestrous and induced ovulators with an estrous cycle of 12 days on average that can vary from three days to a month. They have their first litter at two to three years of age and can conceive again after 17 to 20 months from giving birth, or even sooner if a whole litter is lost. Males can breed at less than two years of age in captivity, but this may be delayed in the wild until the male acquires a territory. A 2007 study showed that females who gave birth to more litters early in their life often died younger, indicating a trade-off between longevity and yearly reproductive success.

Urine-marking in males can become more pronounced when a female in their vicinity comes into estrus. Males, sometimes even those in coalitions, fight among one another to secure access to the female. Often one male will eventually win dominance over the others and mate with the female, though a female can mate with different males. Mating begins with the male approaching the female, who lies down on the ground; individuals often chirp, purr or yelp at this time. No courtship behaviour is observed; the male immediately secures hold of the female's nape, and copulation takes place. The pair then ignore each other, but meet and copulate a few more times three to five times a day for the next two to three days before finally parting ways.

After a gestation of nearly three months, a litter of up six to eight cubs is born. Though those of three to four cubs are more common. Cheetahs' litters tend to be larger than those of most of felid species. Births take place at 20–25 minute intervals in a sheltered place such as thick vegetation. The eyes are shut at birth, and open in four to 11 days. Newborn cubs might spit a lot and make soft churring noises; they start walking by two weeks. Their nape, shoulders and back are thickly covered with long bluish-grey hair, called a mantle, which gives them a mohawk-type appearance; this fur is shed as the cheetah grows older. A study suggested that this mane gives a cheetah cub the appearance of a honey badger, and could act as camouflage from attacks by these badgers or predators that tend to avoid them.

Mothers keep their cubs hidden in dense vegetation for the first two months and nurse in the early morning. The mother is extremely vigilant at this stage; she stays within 1 km (0.62 mi) of the lair, frequently visits her cubs, moves them every five to six days, and remains with them after dark. Despite trying to make minimal noise, she cannot generally defend her litter from predators. Predators are the main cause of death for cubs; of the total deaths, 58.3% were due to predators in the Serengeti, and 88.9% were in the Kgalagadi Transfrontier Park. Deaths also occur from starvation if their mothers abandon them, fires, or pneumonia because of exposure to bad weather. Generation length of the cheetah is six years. The overall juvenile survival rate for cheetahs is 35.7% in the Kgalagadi Transfrontier Park and 34.3% in the Kalahari Desert, compared to a juvenile survival rate of 37% for leopards in the Sabi Sand Game Reserve; high juvenile mortality appears to be a natural part of population dynamics among predators.

Cubs start coming out of the lair at two months of age, trailing after their mother wherever she goes. At this point the mother nurses less and brings solid food to the cubs; they retreat away from the carcass in fear initially, but gradually start eating it. The cubs might purr as the mother licks them clean after the meal. Weaning occurs at four to six months. To train her cubs in hunting, the mother will catch and let go of live prey in front of her cubs. Cubs' play behaviour includes chasing, crouching, pouncing and wrestling; there is plenty of agility, and attacks are seldom lethal. Playing can improve catching skills in cubs, though the ability to crouch and hide may not develop remarkably.

Cubs as young as six months try to capture small prey like hares and young gazelles. However, they may have to wait until as long as 15 months of age to make a successful kill on their own. At around 20 months, offspring become independent; mothers might have conceived again by then. Siblings may remain together for a few more months before parting ways. While females stay close to their mothers, males move farther off. The lifespan of wild cheetahs is 14 to 15 years for females, and their reproductive cycle typically ends by 12 years of age; males generally live as long as ten years.

=== Diet and hunting ===
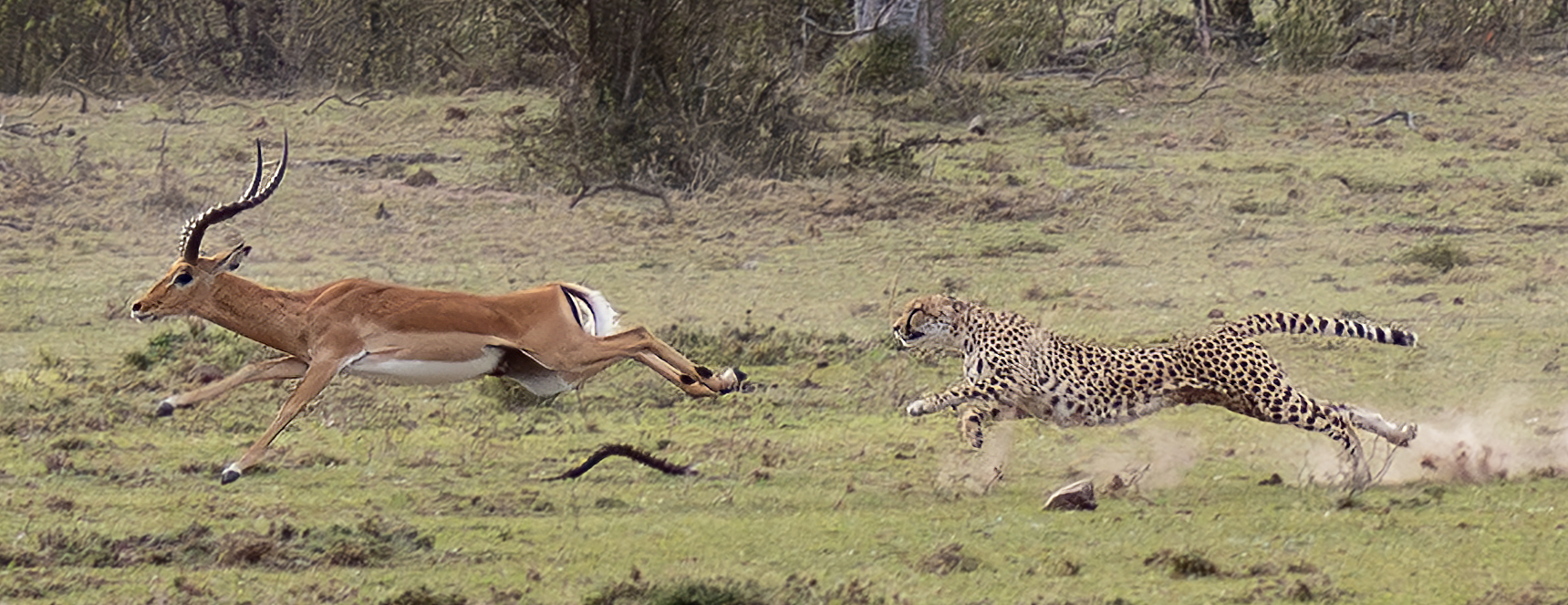
A cheetah in pursuit of an impala

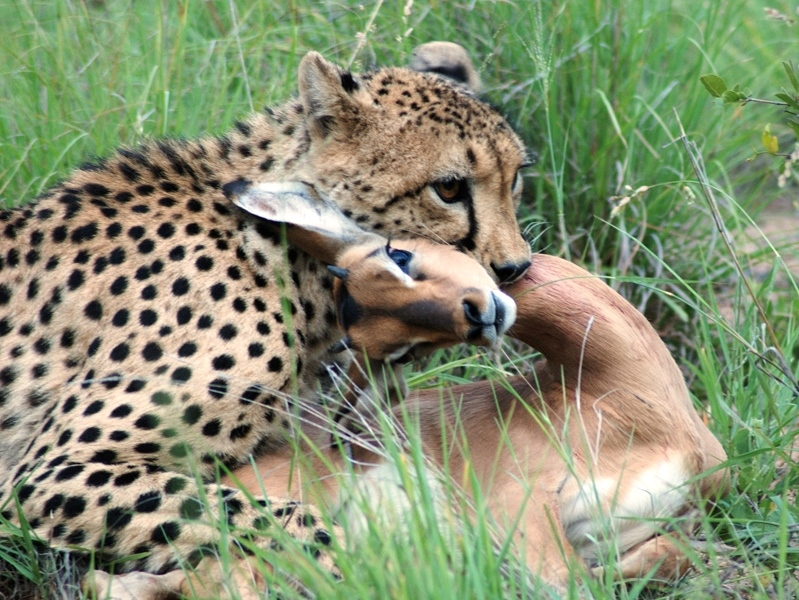
A cheetah strangling an impala by a throat bite

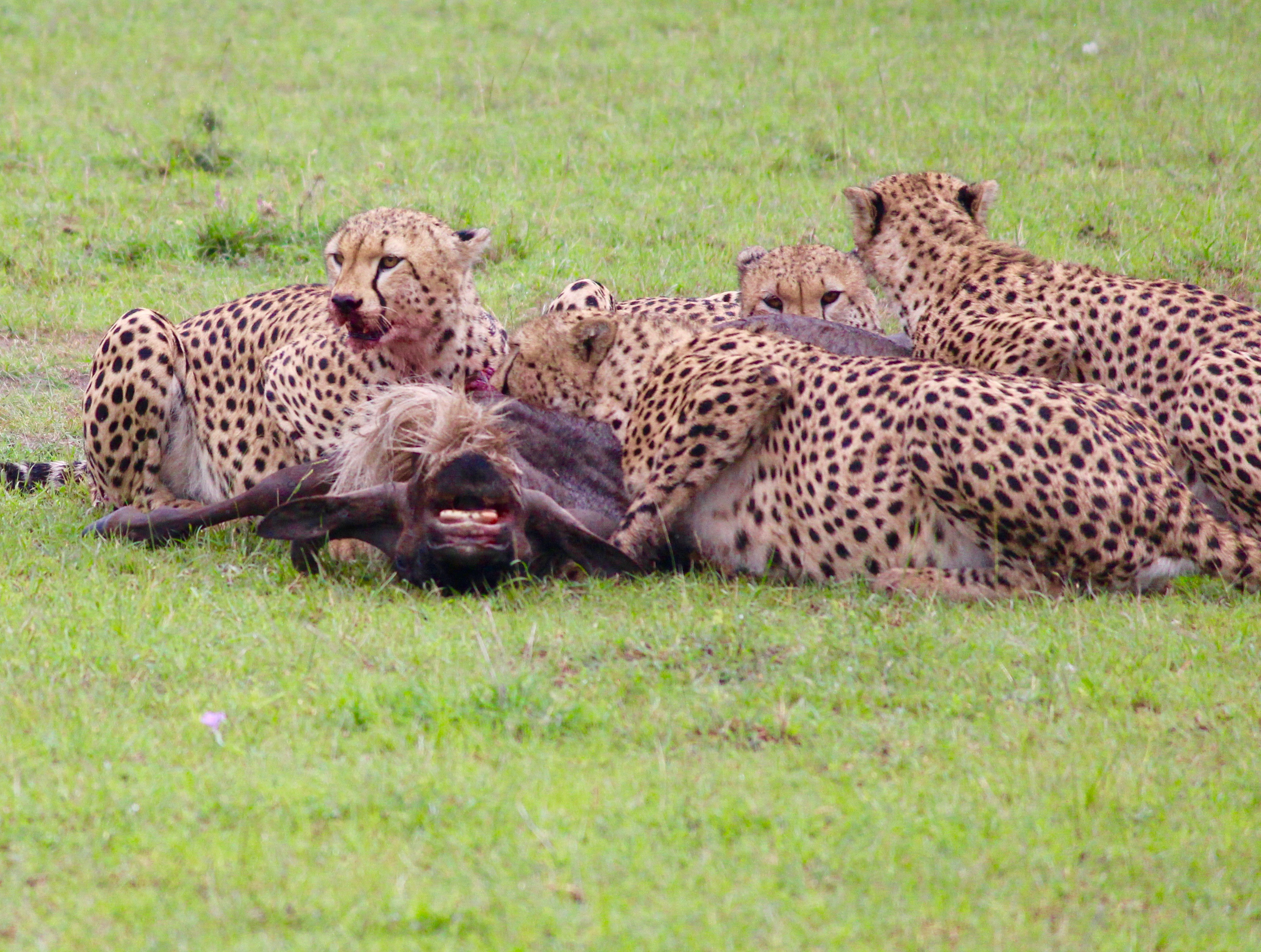
A group of cheetahs feeding on a kill

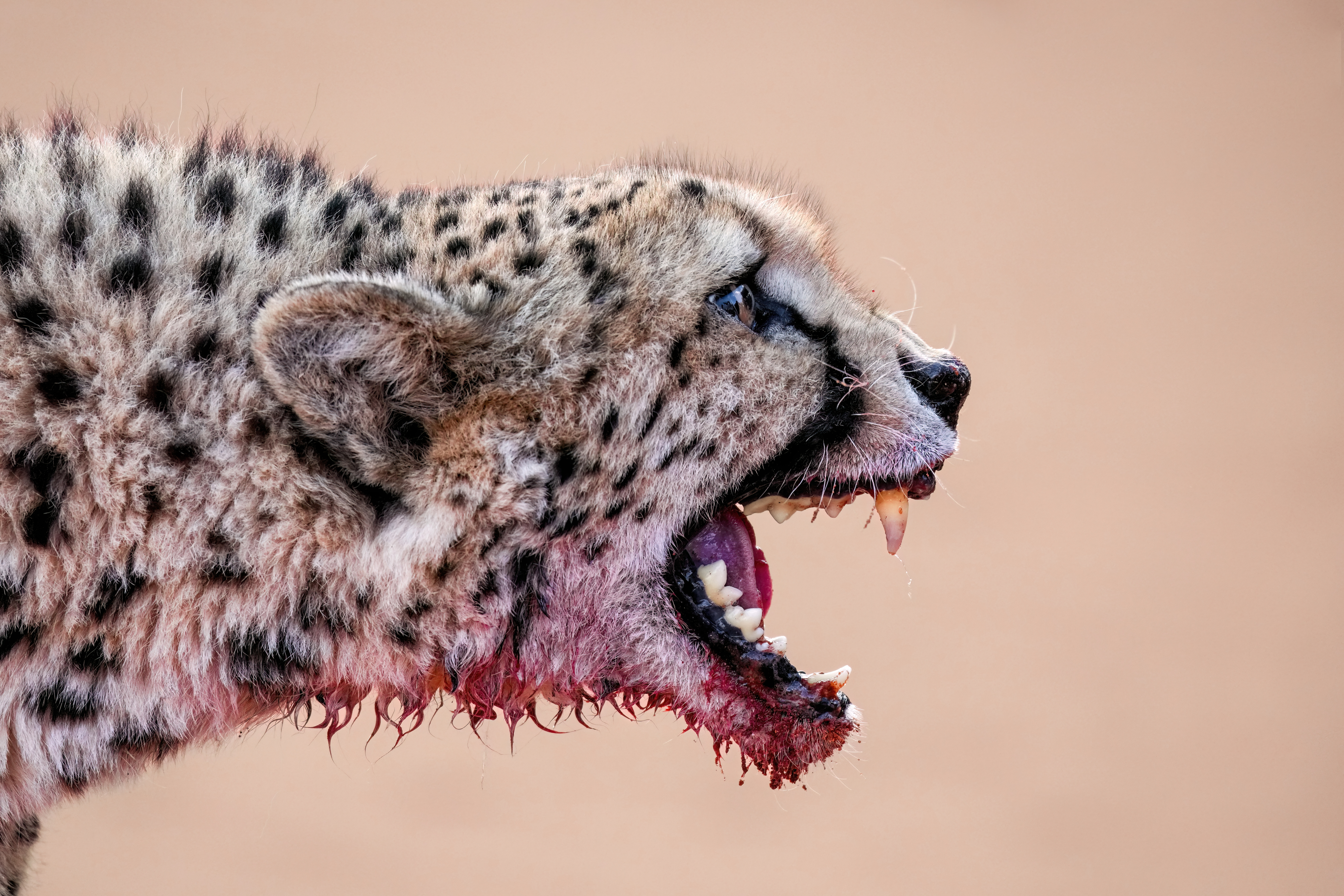
Cheetah hissing after a meal

The cheetah is a carnivore that hunts small to medium prey weighing 20 to 60 kg (44 to 132 lb), but mostly less than 40 kg (88 lb). Its primary prey are medium-sized ungulates. They are the major component of diet in certain areas, such as Dama and Dorcas gazelles in the Sahara, impala in the eastern and southern African woodlands, springbok in the arid savannas to the south and Thomson's gazelle in the Serengeti. Smaller antelopes like the common duiker are frequent prey in the southern Kalahari. Larger ungulates are typically avoided, though nyala, whose males weigh around 120 kg (260 lb), were found to be the major prey in a study in the Phinda Game Reserve. In Namibia cheetahs are the major predators of livestock. In Kruger National Park there are exceptional records of two giraffe calves and two cape buffalo calves hunted by cheetahs. The diet of the Asiatic cheetah consists of chinkara, desert hare, goitered gazelle, urial, wild goats, and livestock; in India cheetahs used to prey mostly on blackbuck.

Prey preferences and hunting success vary with the age, sex, number of cheetahs involved in the hunt, and the vigilance of the prey. Generally, only male coalitions or mother with cubs try to kill larger prey; mothers with cubs look out for larger prey more frequently. Individuals on the periphery of the prey herd are common targets; vigilant prey which react quickly on seeing a cheetah are not preferred.

The cheetah is one of the most iconic pursuit predators, hunting primarily throughout the day, sometimes with peaks at dawn and dusk and avoiding larger predators like the mainly nocturnal lion. Cheetahs in the Sahara, and Maasai Mara in Kenya, hunt after sunset to escape high temperatures. Cheetahs use their vision to hunt; they keep a lookout for prey from resting sites or low branches. The cheetah can close without hiding within 60–70 m (200–230 ft) of the prey, before sprinting for them. Alternatively the cheetah can stalk in cover and close to within 30m. A stalking cheetah assumes a partially crouched posture, with the head lower than the shoulders; it moves slowly and remains still at times. In areas of minimal cover, the cheetah may approach within 200 m (660 ft) of the prey and start the chase. A cheetah can give up if it is detected early. A chase lasts 37.9 seconds on average. In a 2013 study, the length of chases averaged 173 m (568 ft), and the longest run measured 559 m (1,834 ft). To strike down its prey, the cheetah use the well developed and sharp dewclaws of their forepaws to hook the limbs or rump of the prey in full pursuit, and thus disrupt its balance and cause it to fall, allowing the cheetah to pounce on it. Such a fall during a high-speed chase may cause the prey to collapse hard enough to break its limbs.

Once the cheetah has overtaken its prey, it follows closely behind as the prey makes 3–4 zigzag twists in an attempt to escape; if the prey has not escaped by then, it is captured. To kill large prey, the cheetah squeezes their throats with its jaws, strangling them, and maintains its clamp for 5 minutes, which is when the prey stops struggling. A bite on the nape of the neck or the skull suffices to kill small prey. Cheetahs have a general hunting success rate of 25–40%. Once the hunt is over, cheetahs drag their kill near a bush or under a tree. When there is no cover, they move its kill for an average of 64.5 m (212 ft) from the kill site; one individual dragged a kill for 712 m (2,336 ft). Like other cats, a cheetah is exhausted after killing their prey and rests beside the kill, panting for 20–30 minutes, while a lion rest for 15–40 minutes. Meanwhile, cheetahs nearby, who did not take part in the hunt, might feed on the kill immediately. Groups of cheetah consume the kill peacefully, though minor noises and snapping may be observed. Cheetahs can consume large quantities of food; a cheetah at the Etosha National Park, Namibia, was found to consume as much as 10 kg (22 lb) within two hours. However, on a daily basis, a cheetah feeds on around 4 kg (8.8 lb) of meat. Mothers with cubs remain cautious even as they eat, pausing to look around for predators who may steal the kill.

The cheetahs moves its head from side to side so the blade-like shape carnassial teeth tear the flesh, which it can then swallow without chewing. It typically begins with the hindquarters where the tissue is soft, and then progresses toward the abdomen and the spine. It chews ribs on at the ends, but does not tear the limbs apart while eating. Unless the prey is very small, it leaves the skeleton almost intact. It loses 9–14% of its kills to larger and stronger predators. Unlike the African wild dog, the cheetah can cope with a 25% loss of kills, needing to spend only 4 hours per day to hunting to recover the energy wasted; due to its high speed, short duration pursuit strategy, it is energetically flexible. Males and single females spend more time eating as quickly as possible after kill its prey, while mothers with cubs spend more time watching their surroundings while their cubs eat. A few cases of cheetahs scavenging carcasses they did not hunt have been observed, including an incident of a mother and her three 15-month cubs stealing a kill of a lone spotted hyena.

The cheetah appears to have a higher hunting success rate than other predators; in the Serengeti, its success rate for hunting Thomson gazelles is 70%, whereas for the African wild dog it is 57%, for the spotted hyena 33%, and for the lion 26%. In the Okavango delta, its success rate for hunting impalas is 26%, but of the African wild dog only 15.5%. In Kruger National Park, its success rate for hunting impalas is 20.7% whereas that of the leopard is 16%.

=== Competition ===
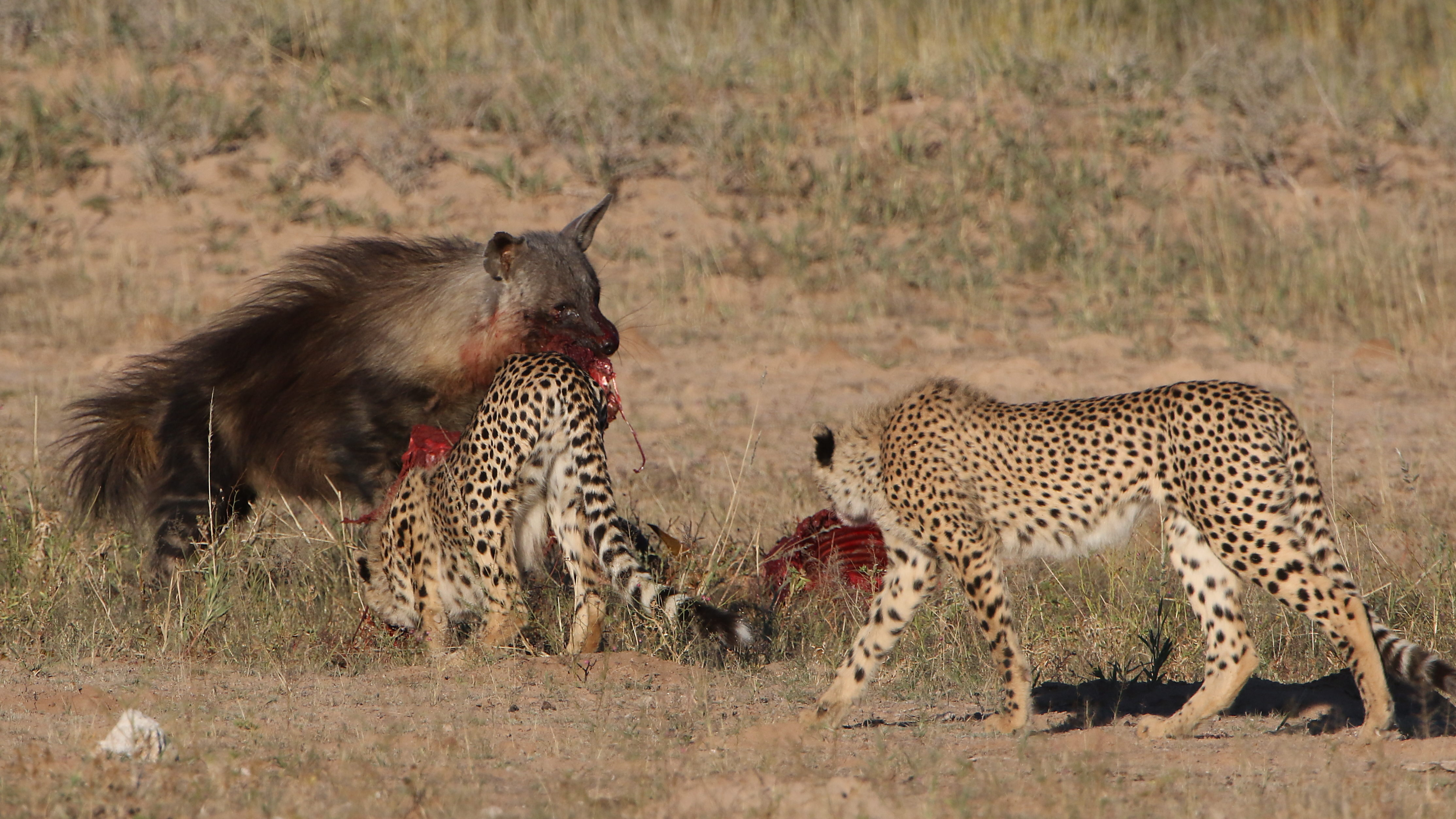
Cheetahs losing their kill to a brown hyena

Larger carnivores can kill cheetahs and steal their kills. Cheetahs sometimes attempt to protect their kills from larger carnivores by making threatening vocalizations and lunges, and cheetah mothers have been observed to drive off leopards threatening their cubs. Large male cheetahs chase leopards for considerable distances.

In the Serengeti, cheetahs lose about 4% of their kills to spotted hyenas. In north-central Namibia, 34% of scent marking sites were shared by cheetahs and leopards, though they avoid interacting with each other by marking at different times, with cheetahs visiting such sites at night, while leopards do so in the morning. Unlike the African wild dog, cheetah population density in an area remains stable when lion population density increases, despite the risk of juvenile mortality; cheetahs only avoids lion visible presence, but not avoids regions inhabited by lions. One case of a black-backed jackal distracting preys so a cheetah can catch it is known.

In Iran, cheetahs compete with leopards for chinkara, bezoar ibex and urial. In the Bafq Protected Area, cheetahs avoided leopards by moving to lower elevations, though one cheetah was killed by a leopard during the study period.

== Threats ==
The cheetah is threatened by several factors, like habitat loss and fragmentation of populations. Habitat loss is caused mainly by the introduction of commercial land use, such as agriculture and industry. It is further aggravated by ecological degradation, like woody plant encroachment, which is common in southern Africa. Moreover, the species apparently requires a sizeable area to live in as indicated by its low population densities. Shortage of prey and conflict with other species such as humans and large carnivores are other major threats. The cheetah appears to be less capable of coexisting with humans than the leopard. With 76% of its range consisting of unprotected land, the cheetah is often targeted by farmers and pastoralists who attempt to protect their livestock, especially in Namibia. Illegal wildlife trade and trafficking is another problem in some places (like Ethiopia). Some tribes, like the Maasai people in Tanzania, have been reported to use cheetah skins in ceremonies. Roadkill is a threat in areas where roads have been constructed in natural habitats or through protected areas; roadkilled cheetahs were found in Kalmand, Touran National Park and Bafq in Iran. The reduced genetic variability makes cheetahs more vulnerable to diseases; however, the threat posed by infectious diseases may be minor, given the low population density and hence a reduced chance of infection.

== Conservation ==
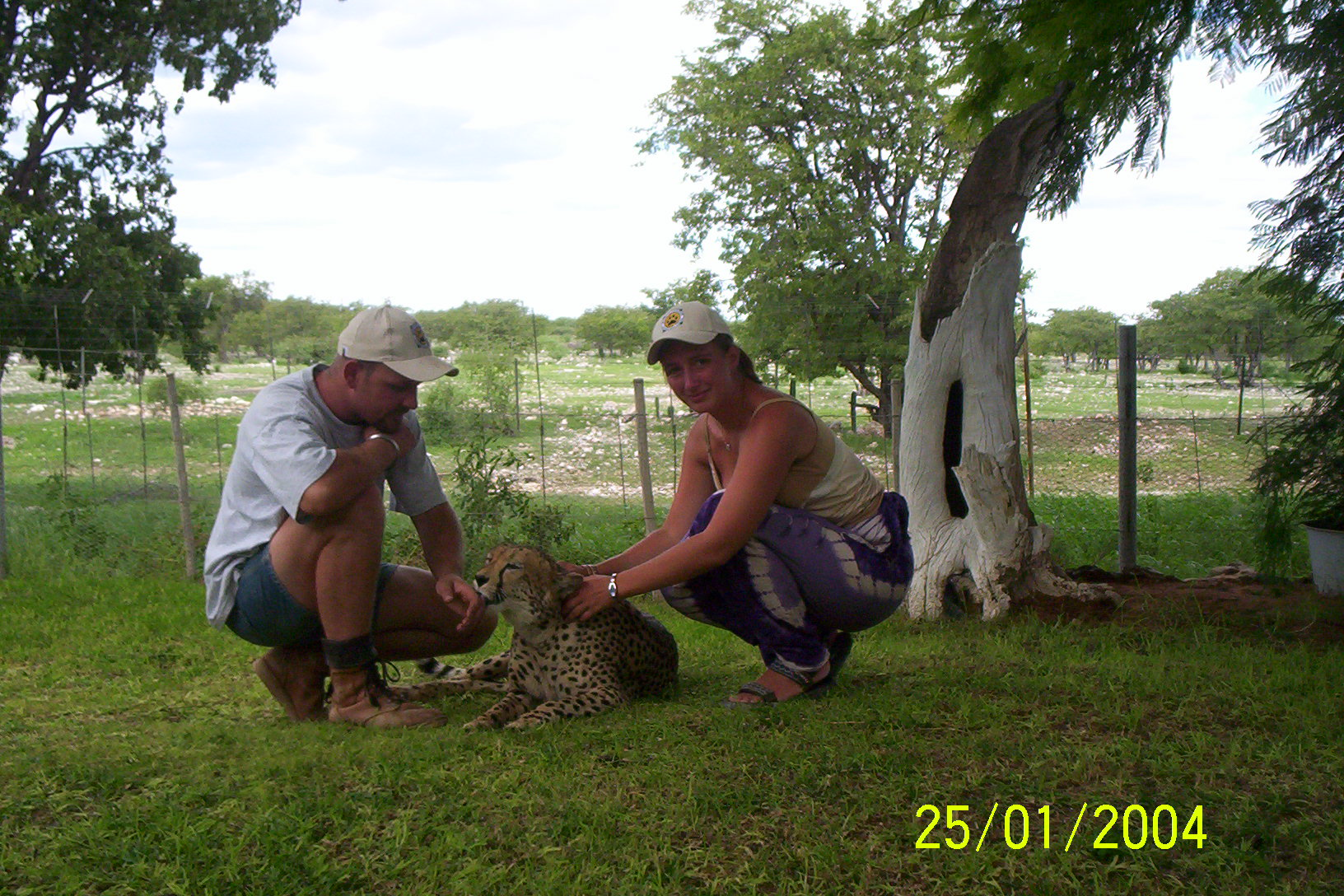
Cheetah Conservation

The cheetah has been classified as Vulnerable on the IUCN Red List; it is listed under Appendix I of the Convention on the Conservation of Migratory Species of Wild Animals and Appendix I of the Convention on International Trade in Endangered Species. The Endangered Species Act enlists the cheetah as Endangered.

=== In Africa ===
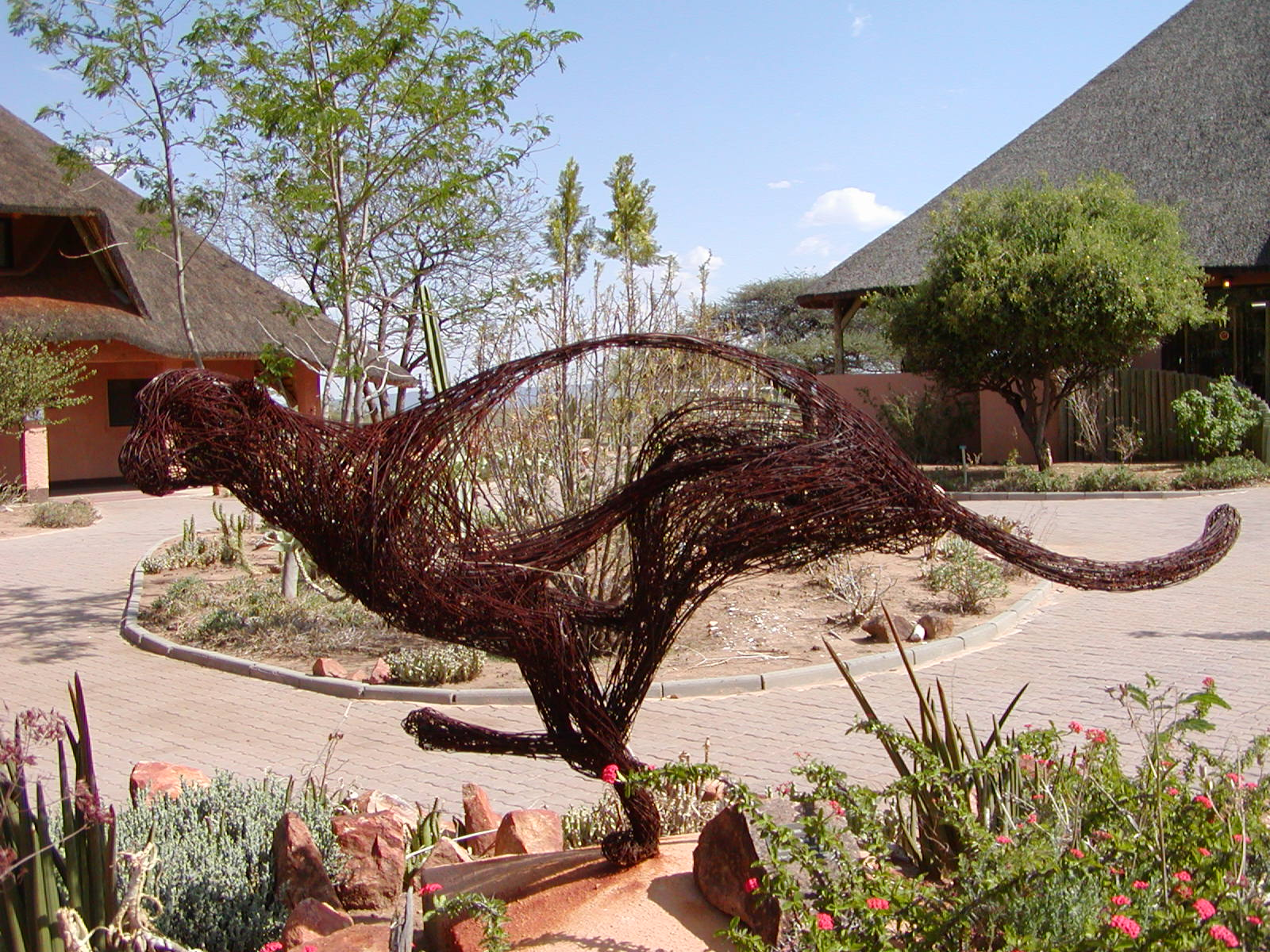
The Cheetah Conservation Fund's Field and Research Centre in Otjiwarongo

Until the 1970s, cheetahs and other carnivores were frequently killed to protect livestock in Africa. Gradually the understanding of cheetah ecology increased and their falling numbers became a matter of concern. The De Wildt Cheetah and Wildlife Centre was set up in 1971 in South Africa to provide care for wild cheetahs regularly trapped or injured by Namibian farmers. By 1987, the first major research project to outline cheetah conservation strategies was underway. The Cheetah Conservation Fund, founded in 1990 in Namibia, put efforts into field research and education about cheetahs on the global platform. It runs a cheetah genetics laboratory, the only one of its kind, in Otjiwarongo; "Bushblok" is an initiative to restore habitat systematically through targeted bush thinning and biomass utilisation. Several more cheetah-specific conservation programmes have since been established, like Cheetah Outreach in South Africa.

The Global Cheetah Action Plan Workshop in 2002 laid emphasis on the need for a range-wide survey of wild cheetahs to demarcate areas for conservation efforts and on creating awareness through training programs. The Range Wide Conservation Program for Cheetah and African Wild Dogs began in 2007 as a joint initiative of the IUCN Cat and Canid Specialist Groups, the Wildlife Conservation Society and the Zoological Society of London. National conservation plans have been developed for several African countries. In 2014, the CITES Standing Committee recognised the cheetah as a "species of priority" in its strategies in northeastern Africa to counter wildlife trafficking.

The cheetah was reintroduced in Malawi in 2017.

=== In Asia ===
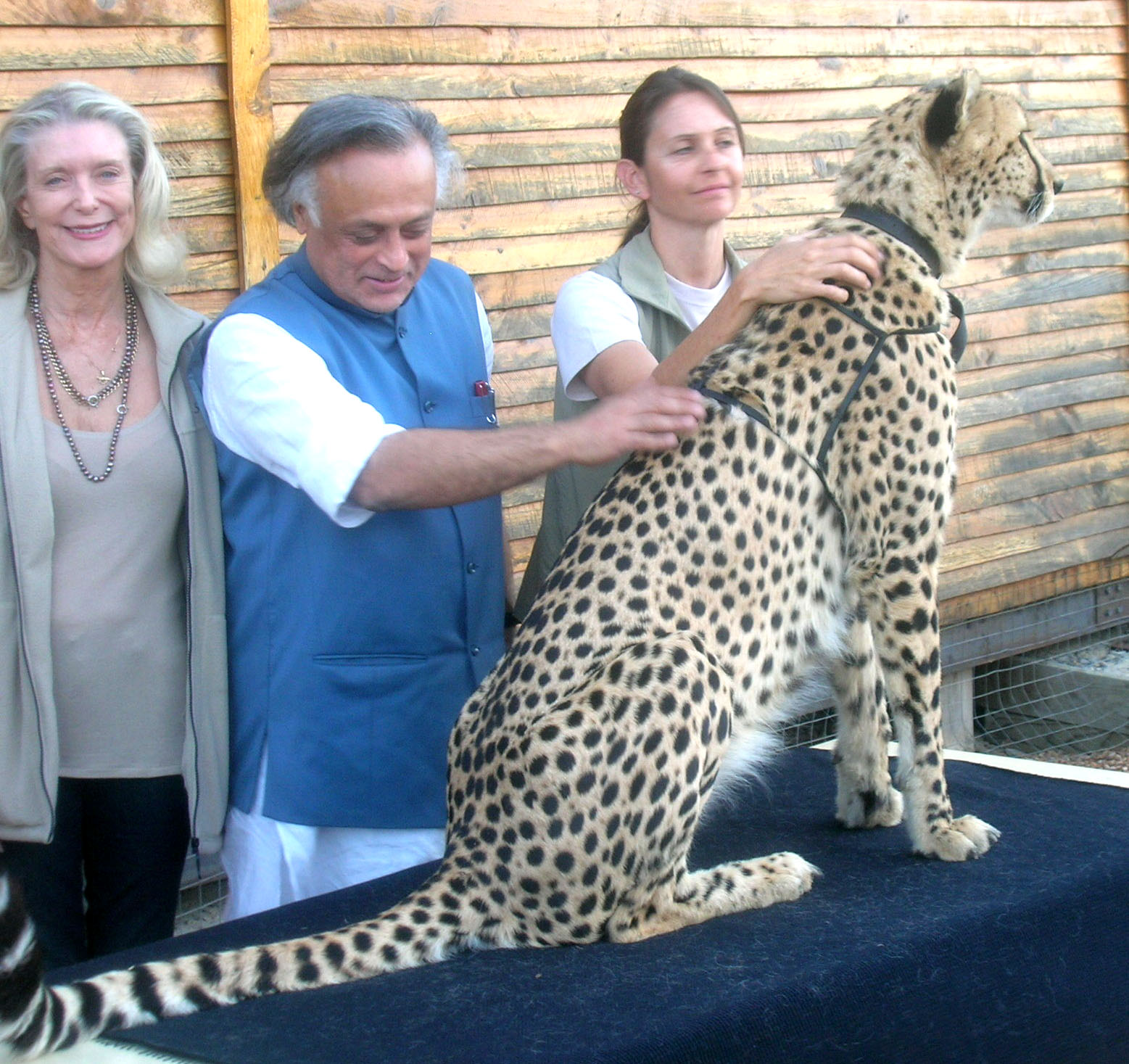
Jairam Ramesh at the Cheetah Outreach Centre near Cape Town in 2010, during his visit to discuss cheetah translocation from South Africa to India

In 2001, the Iranian government collaborated with the CCF, the IUCN, Panthera Corporation, United Nations Development Programme and the Wildlife Conservation Society on the Conservation of Asiatic Cheetah Project (CACP) to protect the natural habitat of the Asiatic cheetah and its prey. In 2004, the Iranian Centre for Sustainable Development (CENESTA) conducted an international workshop to discuss conservation plans with local stakeholders. Iran declared 31 August as National Cheetah Day in 2006. The Iranian Cheetah Strategic Planning meet in 2010 formulated a five-year conservation plan for Asiatic cheetahs. The CACP Phase II was implemented in 2009, and the third phase was drafted in 2018.

During the early 2000s, scientists from the Centre for Cellular and Molecular Biology proposed a plan to clone Asiatic cheetahs from Iran for reintroduction in India, but Iran denied the proposal. In September 2009, the Minister of Environment and Forests assigned the Wildlife Trust of India and the Wildlife Institute of India with examining the potential of importing African cheetahs to India. Kuno Wildlife Sanctuary and Nauradehi Wildlife Sanctuary were suggested as reintroduction sites for the cheetah because of the high prey density. However, plans for reintroduction were stalled in May 2012 by the Supreme Court of India because of a political dispute and concerns over introducing a non-native species to the country. Opponents stated the plan was "not a case of intentional movement of an organism into a part of its native range". On 28 January 2020, the Supreme Court allowed the central government to introduce cheetahs to a suitable habitat in India on an experimental basis to see if they can adapt to it. In 2020, India signed a memorandum of understanding with Namibia as part of Project Cheetah. In July 2022, it was announced that eight cheetahs would be transferred from Namibia to India in August. The eight cheetahs were released into Kuno National Park on 17 September 2022. Since their introduction, they gave birth to 17 cubs. However, by September 2024, eight adult cheetahs and four cubs already died.

On 17 September 2026, on completion of four years of Project Cheetah, the cheetah population was reportedly 52 individuals; four cubs were born at Kuno National Park the very next day making the revised population 56.

== In culture ==
=== Taming ===
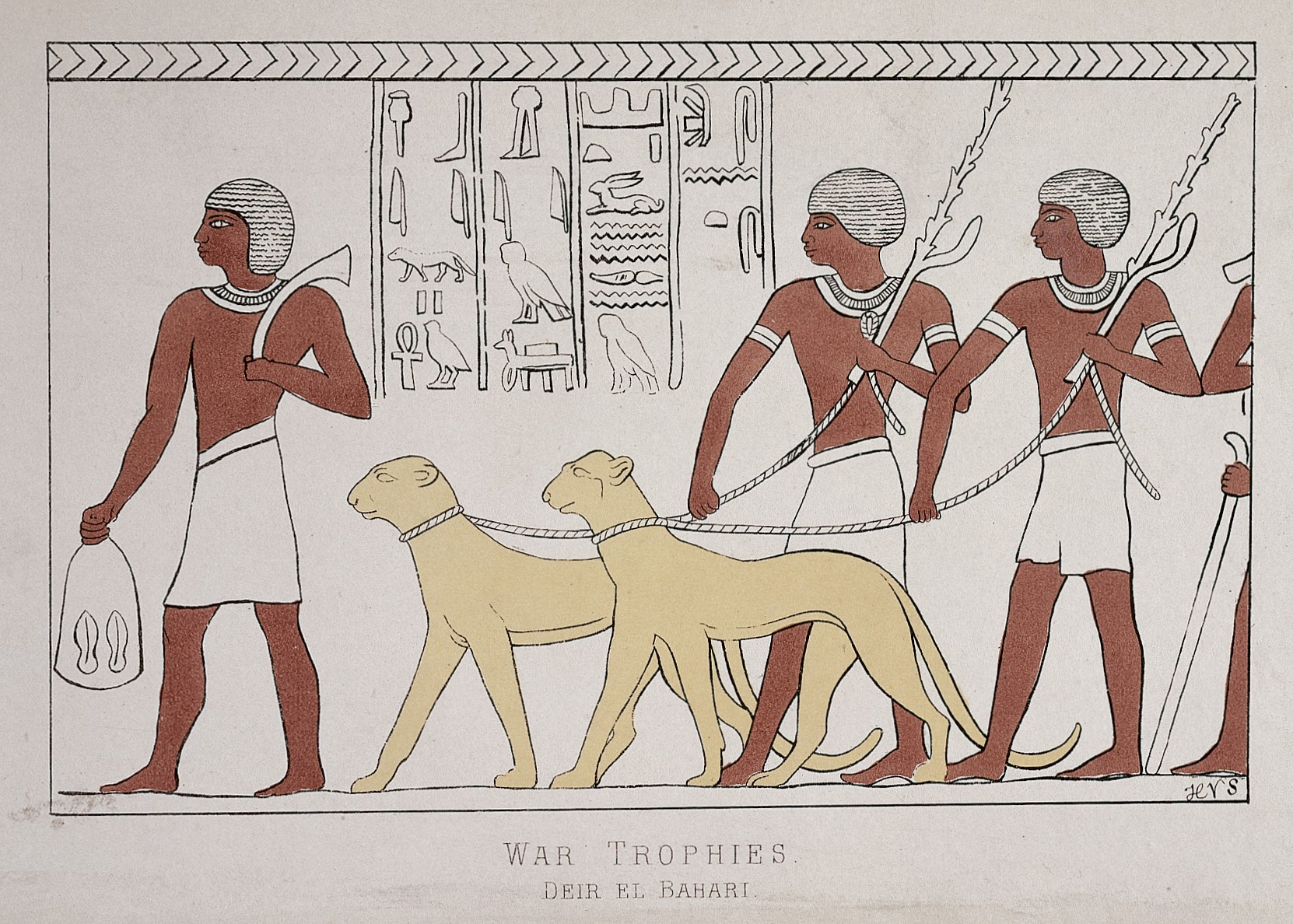
A hieroglyph from Deir el-Bahari depicting leashed cheetahs ("panthers")

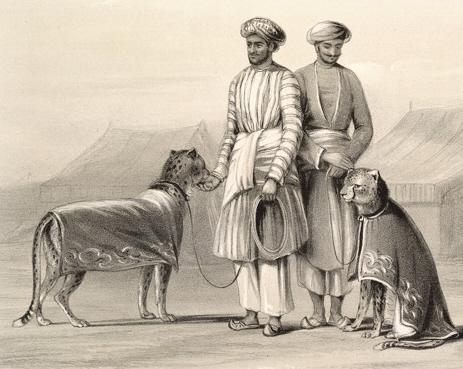
Sketch of cheetahs belonging to the Nawab of Oudh with attendants (1844)

In the past, the cheetah was often called "hunting leopard" because it could be tamed and used for coursing. The cheetah has been tamed since antiquity by the nobility. The earliest known depictions of the cheetah are from the Chauvet Cave in France, dating back to 32,000–26,000 BC. According to historians such as Heinz Friederichs and Burchard Brentjes, the cheetah was first tamed in Sumer and this gradually spread out to central and northern Africa, from where it reached India. The evidence for this is mainly pictorial; for instance, a Sumerian seal dating back to c. 3000 BC, featuring a long-legged leashed animal has fueled speculation that the cheetah was first tamed in Sumer. However, Thomas Allsen argues that the depicted animal might be a large dog. Other historians, such as Frederick Zeuner, have opined that ancient Egyptians were the first to tame the cheetah, from where it gradually spread into central Asia, Iran and India.

In comparison, theories of the cheetah's taming in Egypt are stronger and include timelines proposed on this basis. Mafdet, one of the ancient Egyptian deities worshiped during the First Dynasty (3100–2900 BC), was sometimes depicted as a cheetah. Ancient Egyptians believed the spirits of deceased pharaohs were taken away by cheetahs. Reliefs in the Deir el-Bahari temple complex tell of an expedition by Egyptians to the Land of Punt during the reign of Hatshepsut (1507–1458 BC) that fetched, among other things, animals called "panthers". During the New Kingdom (16th to 11th centuries BC), cheetahs were common pets for royalty, who adorned them with ornate collars and leashes. Rock carvings depicting cheetahs dating back to 2000–6000 years ago have been found in Twyfelfontein, Namibia; little else has been discovered in connection to the taming of cheetahs (or other cats) in southern Africa.

Hunting cheetahs are known in pre-Islamic Arabic art from Yemen. Hunting with cheetahs became prevalent toward the seventh century AD. In the Middle East, the cheetah would accompany the nobility to hunts in a special seat on the back of the saddle. Taming was an elaborate process and could take a year to complete. The Romans may have referred to the cheetah as the leopardos (λεοπάρδος) or leontopardos (λεοντόπαρδος), believing it to be a hybrid between a leopard and a lion because of the mantle seen in cheetah cubs and the difficulty of breeding them in captivity. A Roman hunting cheetah is depicted in a 4th-century mosaic from Lod, Israel. Cheetahs continued to be used into the Byzantine period of the Roman Empire, with "hunting leopards" being mentioned in the Cynegetica (283/284 AD).

The Mughal ruler Akbar the Great (1556–1605 AD) is said to have kept as many as 1000 khasa (imperial) cheetahs. His son Jahangir wrote in his memoirs, Tuzk-e-Jahangiri, that only one of them gave birth. Mughal rulers trained cheetahs and caracals in a similar way as the western Asians, and used them to hunt game, especially blackbuck. The rampant hunting severely affected the populations of wild animals in India; by 1927, cheetahs had to be imported from Africa.

=== In arts ===
In eastern Asia, records are confusing as regional names for the leopard and the cheetah may be used interchangeably. The earliest depiction of cheetahs from eastern Asia dates back to the Tang dynasty in the 7th to 10th centuries AD; paintings depict tethered cheetahs and cheetahs mounted on horses. Chinese emperors would use cheetahs and caracals as gifts. In the 13th and 14th centuries, the Yuan rulers bought numerous cheetahs from the western parts of the empire and from Muslim merchants. According to the Ming Shilu, the subsequent Ming dynasty (14th to 17th centuries) continued this practice. Tomb figurines from the Mongol empire, dating back to the reign of Kublai Khan (1260–1294 AD), represent cheetahs on horseback.

According to theologian Philip Schaff, the "leopard" mentioned in Habakkuk 1:8 could actually be a cheetah.

The cheetah has been widely portrayed in a variety of artistic works. In Bacchus and Ariadne, an oil painting by the 16th-century Italian painter Titian, the chariot of the Greek god Dionysus (Bacchus) is depicted as being drawn by two cheetahs. The cheetahs in the painting were previously considered to be leopards. In 1764, English painter George Stubbs commemorated the gifting of a cheetah to King George III by the English Governor of Madras, Sir George Pigot in his painting Cheetah with Two Indian Attendants and a Stag. The painting depicts a cheetah, hooded and collared by two Indian servants, along with a stag it was supposed to prey upon. The 1896 painting The Caress by the 19th-century Belgian symbolist painter Fernand Khnopff is a representation of the myth of Oedipus and the Sphinx and portrays a creature with a woman's head and a cheetah's body.

=== In captivity ===
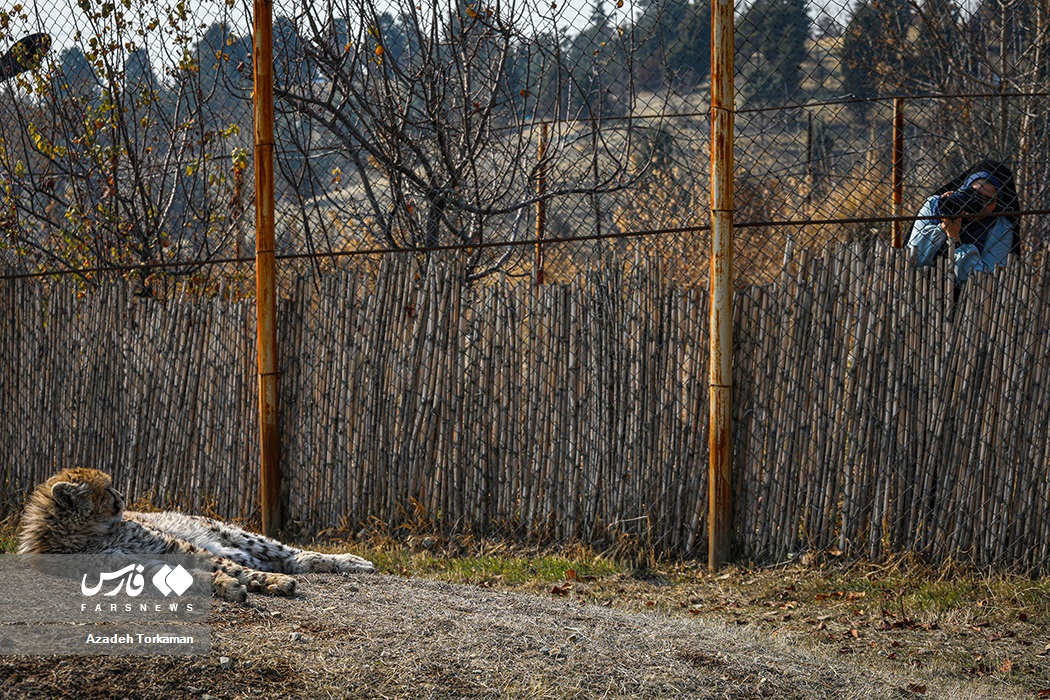
Cheetah in Pardisan Park

The first cheetah was brought to a zoo in 1829 at the Zoological Society of London. Early captive cheetahs showed a high mortality rate, with an average lifespan of 3–4 years. After trade of wild cheetahs was delimited by the enforcement of CITES in 1975, more efforts were put into breeding in captivity; in 2014 the number of captive cheetahs worldwide was estimated at 1,730 individuals, with 87% born in captivity.

As of 1985, cheetah cub mortality was generally lower with 24% than the average of 33% for 17 carnivore mammals, including 9 felids; cheetah cub mortality was the second lowest among felids. Cubs died due to stillbirths, birth defects, maternal neglect, and diseases. As of 2014, 23% of the captive cheetahs worldwide died under one year of age, mostly within a month of birth. Compared to other felids, cheetahs need specialised care because of their higher vulnerability to stress-induced diseases; this has been attributed to their low genetic variability and factors of captive life. Common diseases of cheetahs include feline herpesvirus, feline infectious peritonitis, gastroenteritis, glomerulosclerosis, leukoencephalopathy, myelopathy, nephrosclerosis and veno-occlusive disease. High density of cheetahs in a place, closeness to other large carnivores in enclosures, improper handling, exposure to public and frequent movement between zoos can be sources of stress for cheetahs. Recommended management practices for cheetahs include spacious and ample access to outdoors, stress minimisation by exercise and limited handling, and following proper hand-rearing protocols (especially for pregnant females).

Wild cheetahs are far more successful breeders than captive cheetahs; this has also been linked to increased stress levels in captive individuals. In a study in the Serengeti, females had a 95% success rate in breeding, compared to 20% recorded for North American captive cheetahs in another study. In November 2017, a cheetah gave birth to eight cubs at the Saint Louis Zoo, setting a record for the most births recorded by the Association of Zoos and Aquariums. Chances of successful mating in captive males can be improved by replicating social groups such as coalitions observed in the wild.

=== Attacks on humans ===
There are no documented records of wild cheetahs attacking and killing people. However, there have been a few instances of captive cheetahs mauling people. In 2007, a cheetah in a Belgian zoo killed a woman who had sneaked into its enclosure outside of visiting hours. In 2017, a captive cheetah attacked a three-year-old boy on a farm in Philippolis, South Africa; he died from his injuries, despite being airlifted to a hospital.

== See also ==
- List of largest cats
