= Max Hilzheimer =

German zoologist

Otto Jacob Max Hilzheimer (15 November 1877, Kehnert - 10 January 1946, Berlin-Charlottenburg) was a German zoologist who specialized in the mammals and was a pioneer of conservation in Berlin. He was also an expert on domestic animals in antiquity.

Max was born to Alfred and Johanna née Pringsheim (Max's uncle Nathaniel Pringsheim was a botanist). Max studied zoology at Strasbourg and Munich and worked under Richard Hertwig with a doctoral thesis on the Hypopharynx of Hymenoptera. In 1904 he was in southern France at the Laboratoire Russe de Zoologie von Villefranche-sur-Mer. He worked at the Strasbourg Museum and habilitated from the Technical University, Stuttgart in 1907. Hilzheimer was a co-founder of the German Society for Mammalogy in 1926 along with Hermann Pohle and Kurt Ohnesorge. He was also a pioneer conservationist who established a nature conservation unit in Berlin in March, 1927. This would later become the Berlin Commission for Natural Heritage Management with him as the first commissioner. He was also a director at the Märkisches Museum until January 1936. In 1935, his German citizenship was withdrawn due to his Jewish background and he was removed from all positions in 1936. His position was taken by Johannes Karl Wilhelm Klose (1880-1963). He married Walburga Münzhuber, from a Catholic family, in 1907, and it was through her efforts that he survived the Nazi period. He lived in seclusion and died in 1946.

Hilzheimer was an expert on the antiquity of the breeds of dog, sheep and horse.
