= Limpopo (disambiguation) =

Limpopo is a province in South Africa.

Limpopo may also refer to:

- Limpopo National Park, a wildlife conservation park in Mozambique
- Limpopo River, a river in southern Africa
- Limpopo (cricket team), a former first-class cricket team in Limpopo, South Africa
- 1490 Limpopo, an asteroid named for the Limpopo River
- Red Elvises or Limpopo, a Russian-American folk rock band from California
- "Limpopo", a 2013 single by KCee

== See also ==
- Great Limpopo Transfrontier Park, a peace park in the process of being formed between Mozambique, South Africa and Zimbabwe.
