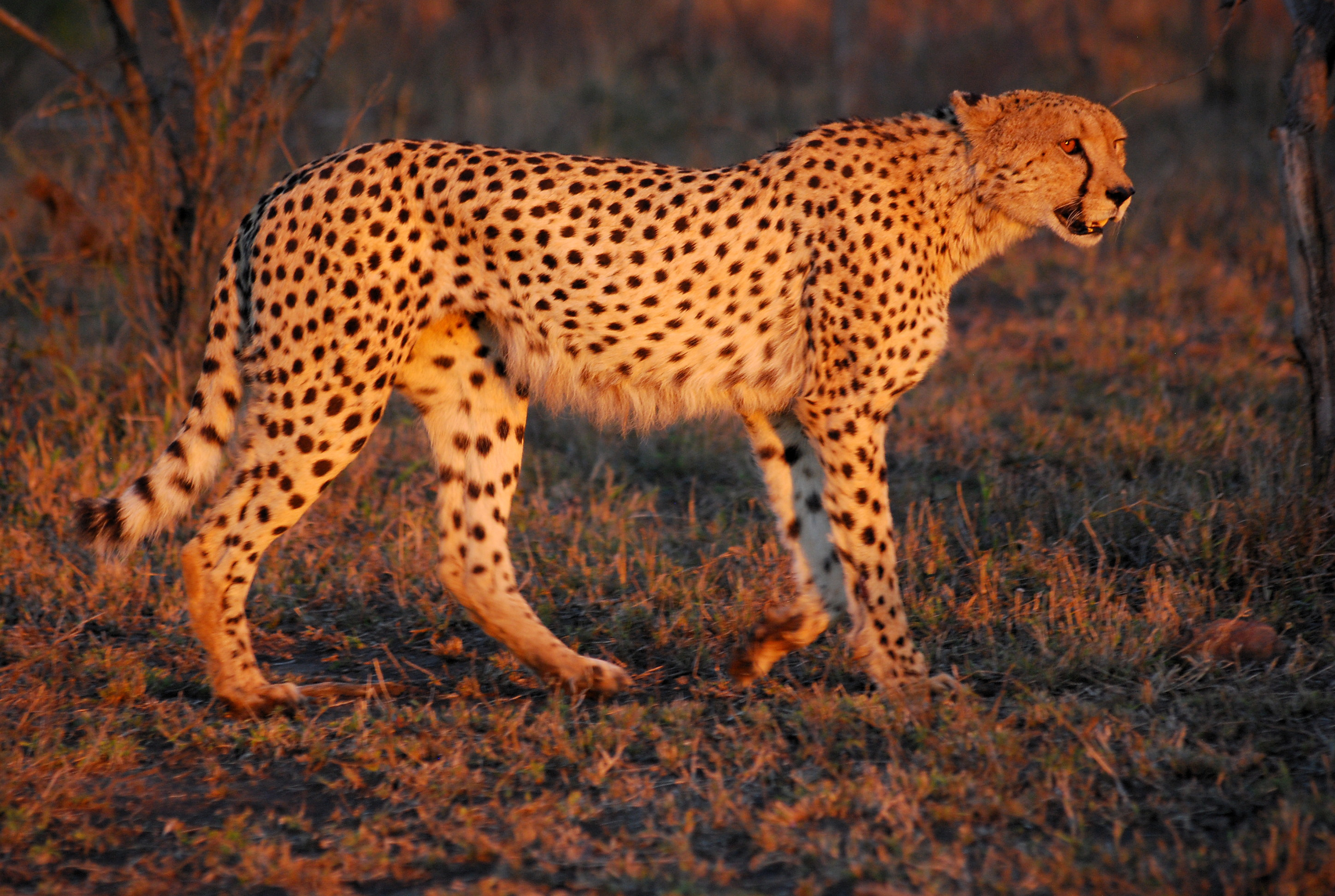
- A cheetah at the Hluhluwe–iMfolozi Park, South Africa

Scientific classification
- Kingdom: Animalia
- Phylum: Chordata
- Class: Mammalia
- Order: Carnivora
- Family: Felidae
- Genus: Acinonyx
- Species: A. jubatus
- Subspecies: A. j. jubatus

Trinomial name
- Acinonyx jubatus jubatus (Schreber, 1775)
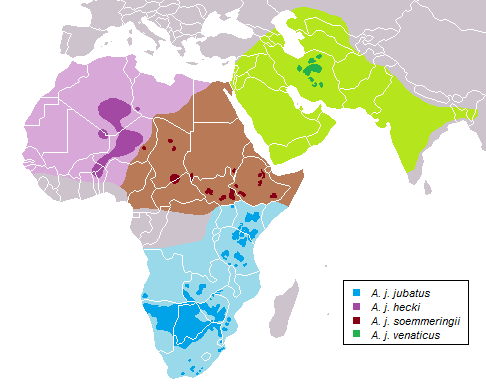
- A. j. jubatus range (blue)

Synonyms
- A. j. guttata (Hermann, 1804); A. j. fearsoni (Smith, 1834); A. j. fearonis (Fitzinger, 1869); A. j. lanea (Sclater, 1877); A. j. obergi (Hilzheimer, 1913); A. j. ngorongorensis (Hilzheimer, 1913); A. j. raineyi (Heller, 1913); A. j. velox (Heller, 1913); A. j. rex (Pocock, 1927)

= Southeast African cheetah =

Subspecies of carnivore

The Southeast African cheetah (Acinonyx jubatus jubatus) is the nominate cheetah subspecies native to East and Southern Africa. It lives mainly in the Kalahari Basin and deserts of the Kalahari, the savannahs of Okavango Delta, and the grasslands of the Transvaal region in South Africa. In Namibia, it lives in farmlands.

== Taxonomy ==
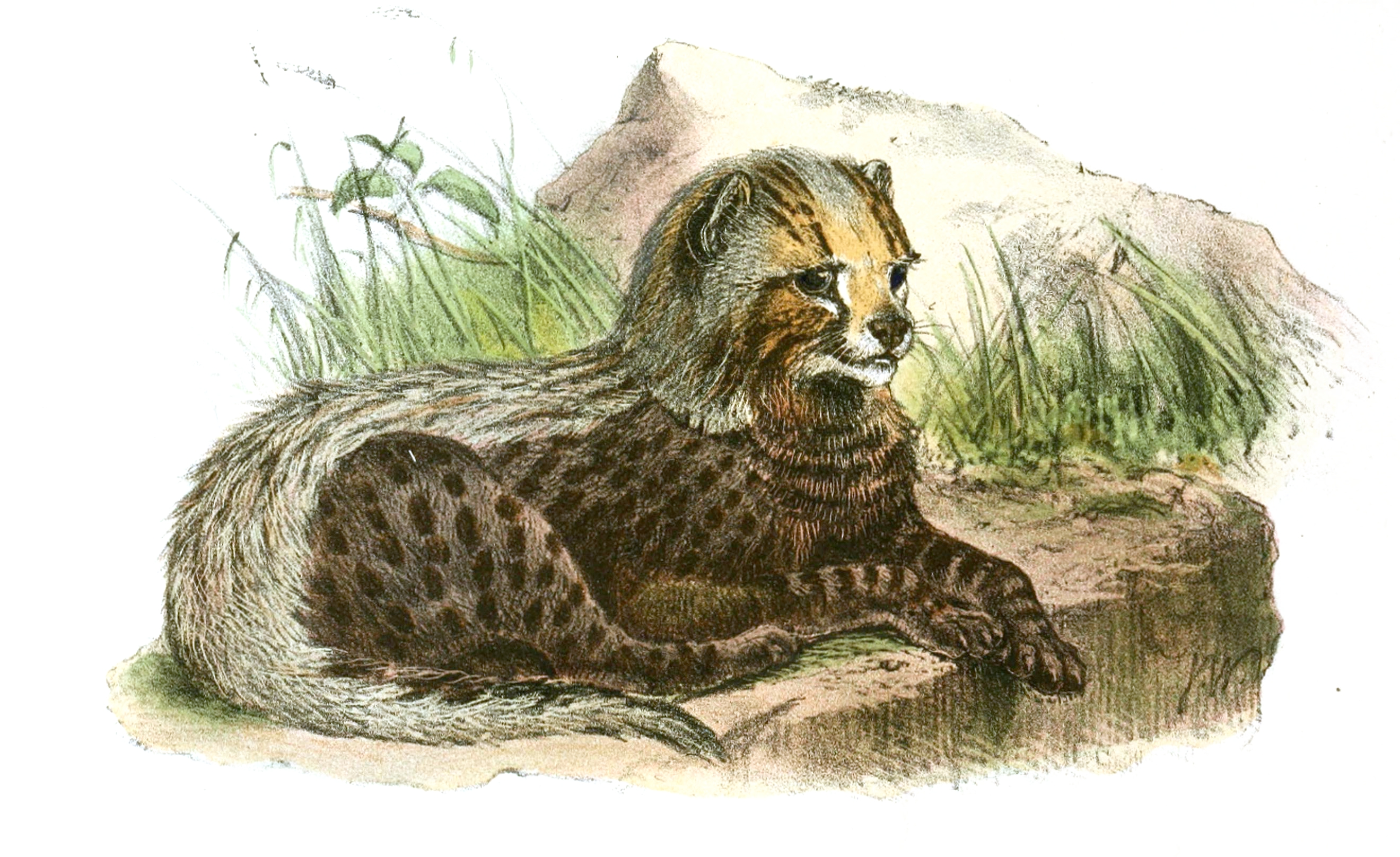
An illustration of a cheetah cub (Acinonyx jubatus guttata) by Joseph Wolf in the Proceedings of the Zoological Society of London, 1867

The Southern African cheetah was first described by German naturalist Johann Christian Daniel von Schreber in his book Die Säugethiere in Abbildungen nach der Natur mit Beschreibungen (The Mammals illustrated as in Nature with Descriptions), published in 1775. Schreber described the species on the basis of a specimen from the Cape of Good Hope. It is therefore the nominate subspecies. Subpopulations have been called "South African cheetah" and "Namibian cheetah."

Following Schreber's description, other naturalists and zoologists also described cheetah specimens from many parts of Southern and East Africa that today are all considered synonyms of A. j. jubatus:

- Felis guttata proposed in 1804 by Johann Hermann;
- Felis fearonii proposed in 1834 by Andrew Smith;
- Felis lanea proposed in 1877 by Philip Sclater;
- Acinonyx jubatus obergi proposed in 1913 by Max Hilzheimer;
- Acinonyx jubatus ngorongorensis proposed in 1913 by Hilzheimer on basis of a specimen from Ngorongoro, German East Africa;
- Acinonyx jubatus velox proposed in 1913 by Edmund Heller on basis of a cheetah that was shot by Kermit Roosevelt in June 1909 in the Kenyan highlands.
- Acinonyx rex proposed in 1927 by Reginald Innes Pocock on basis of a specimen from the Umvukwe Range in Rhodesia.

In 2005, the authors of Mammal Species of the World grouped A. j. guttata, A. j. lanea, A. j. obergi, and A. j. rex under A j. jubatus, whilst recognizing A. j. raineyi and A. j. velox as valid taxa and considering P. l. ngorongorensis as synonymous with raineyi.

In 2017, the Cat Classification Task Force of the Cat Specialist Group subsumed all cheetah populations from most parts of Eastern and Southern Africa into A. j. jubatus, thus making it the most widespread subspecies in the continent.

== Evolutionary history ==
From the early Pleistocene, the earliest African cheetah fossils have been found in the lower beds of the Olduvai Gorge site in northern Tanzania, although cheetah fossils in Southern Africa were found to be 3.5 to 3.0 million years old. The Southeast African cheetah is the second-oldest subspecies.

Cheetahs from Africa and Asia were previously considered genetically identical to each other. DNA research and analysis started in the early 1990s and showed that the Southern and East African cheetahs are indeed separate subspecies.

Until September 2009, the Asiatic cheetah was thought to be identical to African cheetahs. Stephen J. O'Brien from the Laboratory of Genomic Diversity of the National Cancer Institute was of the opinion that they have been separated from each other for only 5,000 years, which is not enough time to be classified as distinct subspecies.

In early 2011, results of phylogeographic analysis of 94 cheetah samples from museum collections, wild and captive specimens, revealed that Southeast African and Asiatic cheetahs are genetically distinct, and probably diverged between 32,000 and 67,000 years ago. The mitochondrial DNA data indicate that the cheetah samples from East Africa had no common haplotype with samples from Southern Africa, although one haplotype present in cheetah samples from Tanzania and Kenya clustered with samples from South Africa. The population in East Africa might have derived from a relatively recent recolonization event. The divergence between the cheetah populations in Southern, East and Northern Africa occurred between 6,700 and 32,400 years ago.

== Genetics ==
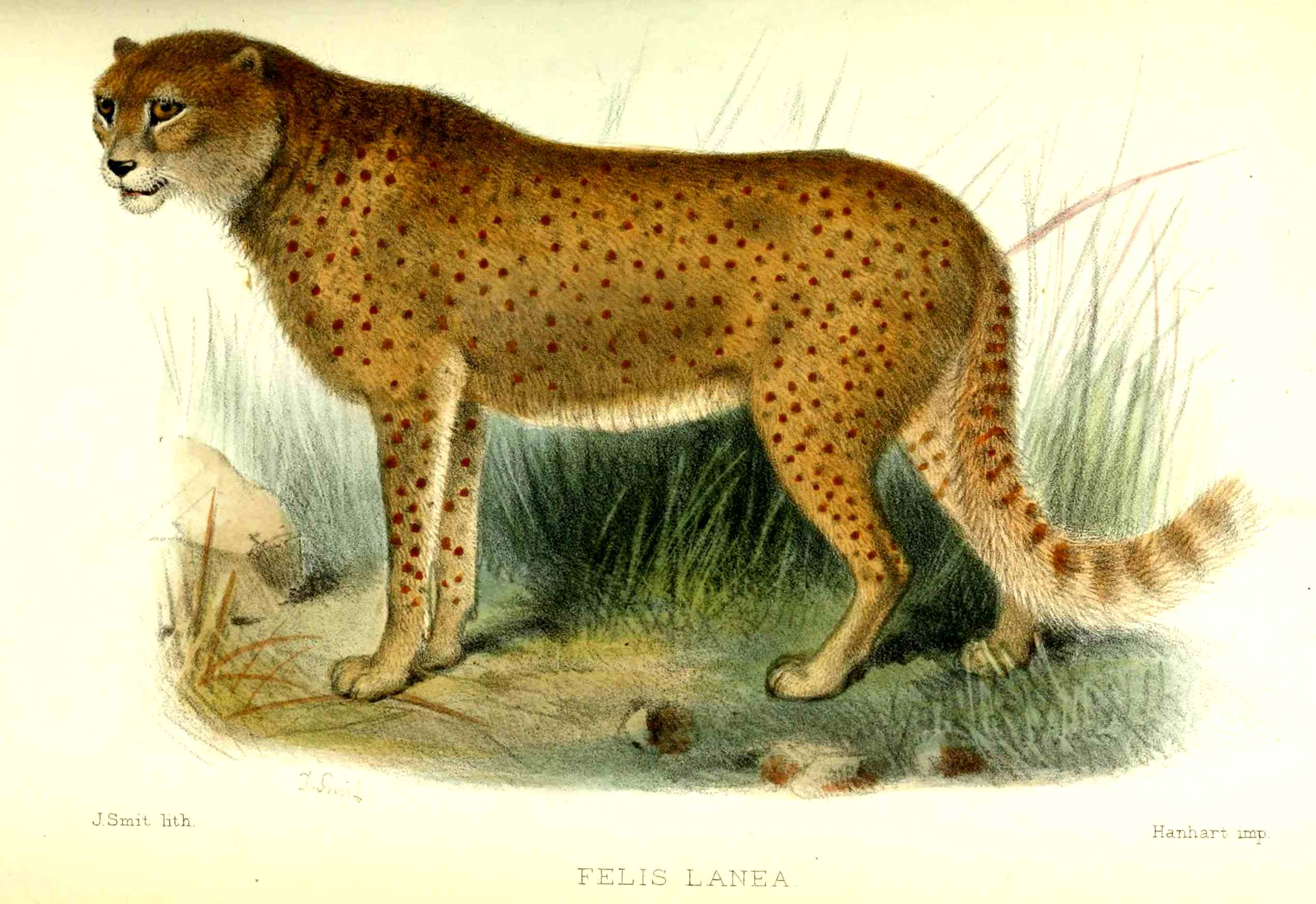
An illustration of the woolly cheetah by Joseph Smit in the Proceedings of the Zoological Society of London, 1877

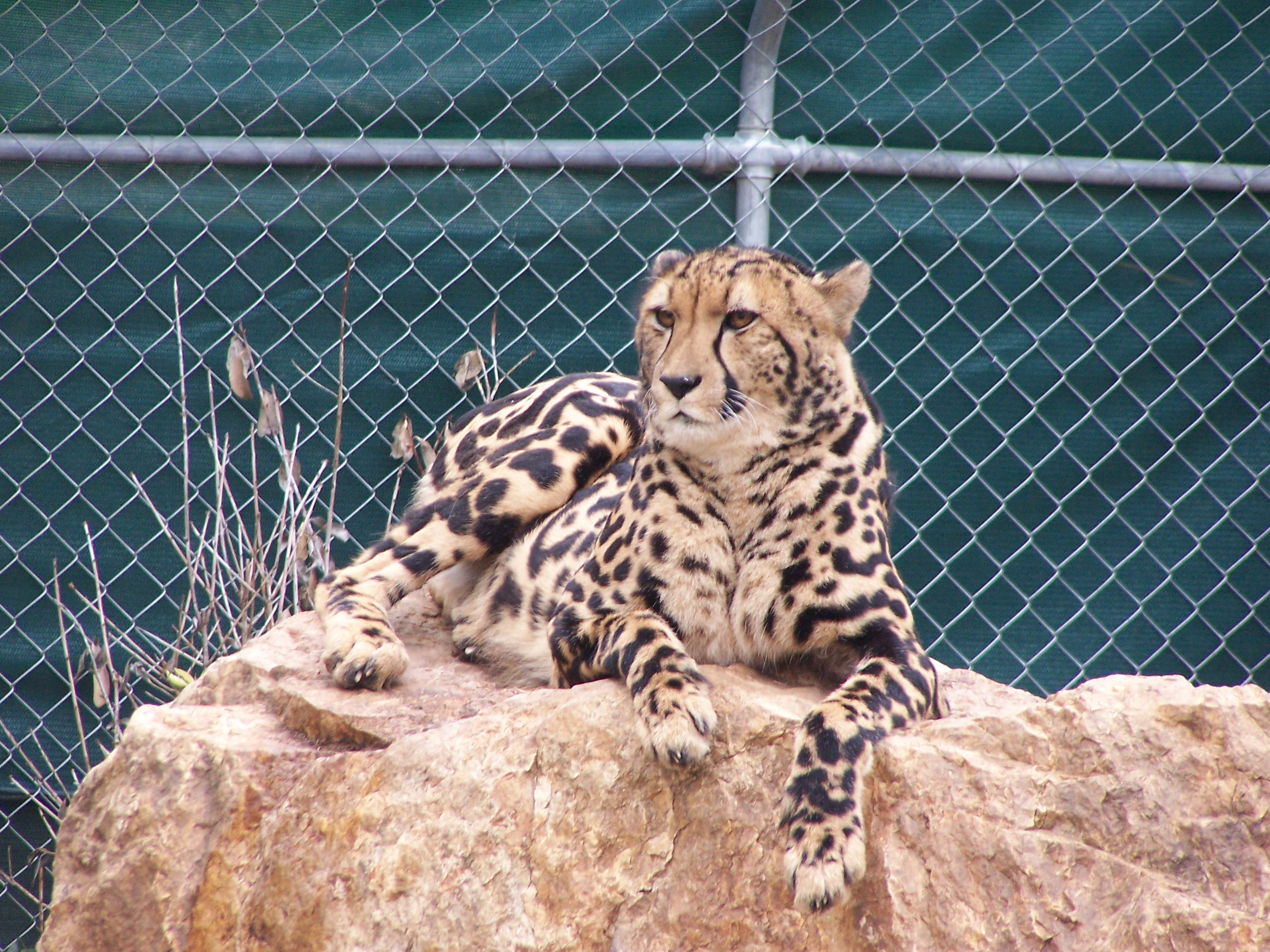
A captive king cheetah

Historically, cheetahs were thought to be genetically homogeneous. In 2011, results of a phylogeographic study revealed that the Asiatic cheetah and cheetah populations in Africa are genetically distinct and separated between 32,000 and 67,000 years ago.

The woolly cheetah was discovered in the late 19th century by English zoologist Philip Sclater. It was considered a separate species of cheetah that had a thicker body and longer and denser fur. Several specimens were obtained. These creatures may be the same species as the present-day cheetah, but with a genetic disposition to long fur. In 1877, Sclater, of the Zoological Society of London, wrote of a recent acquisition by the zoo. In 1878, a second woolly cheetah was reported as a preserved specimen in the South African Museum. Both the London and South African specimens had come from Beaufort West. In 1884, a third skin was obtained from the same area, though this had more distinct spots and was a little smaller. By the late 1880s, the trophy hunters had eliminated the woolly cheetahs; from the number and locality of specimens, this variant seems to have evolved very recently (generations rather than millennia); perhaps all those animals (it seems only a handful are known at best) were the offspring of a single couple born around 1875, or maybe one more generation. The woolly cheetah has, in any case, vanished.

The king cheetah was considered a different species in 1927 by naturalist Reginald Innes Pocock. It was found to be a mutation caused by a recessive gene. The king cheetah is a rare variant of the Southern cheetah, first discovered in southern Rhodesia in 1925. A king cheetah was first found in South Africa in 1940 and in Botswana in 1942. However, in 1981, king cheetahs were shown to have never been a different species, as king cheetahs were born from regular parents at the De Wildt Cheetah and Wildlife Centre in South Africa, and another king cheetah were born from two female cheetahs having mated with a wild-caught male cheetah from the Transvaal Province, and more king cheetahs were born later at the De Wildt Cheetah Centre. The king cheetahs are found in South Africa, Zimbabwe, and Botswana. In 2012, the cause of this alternative coat pattern was found to be a mutation in the gene for transmembrane aminopeptidase Q (Taqpep), the same gene responsible for the striped "mackerel" versus blotched "classic" patterning seen in tabby cats.

The cheetah also has melanism as one of its rare color morphs. A melanistic cheetah in Zambia was seen by Vesey Fitzgerald in the company of a spotted cheetah.

== Characteristics ==
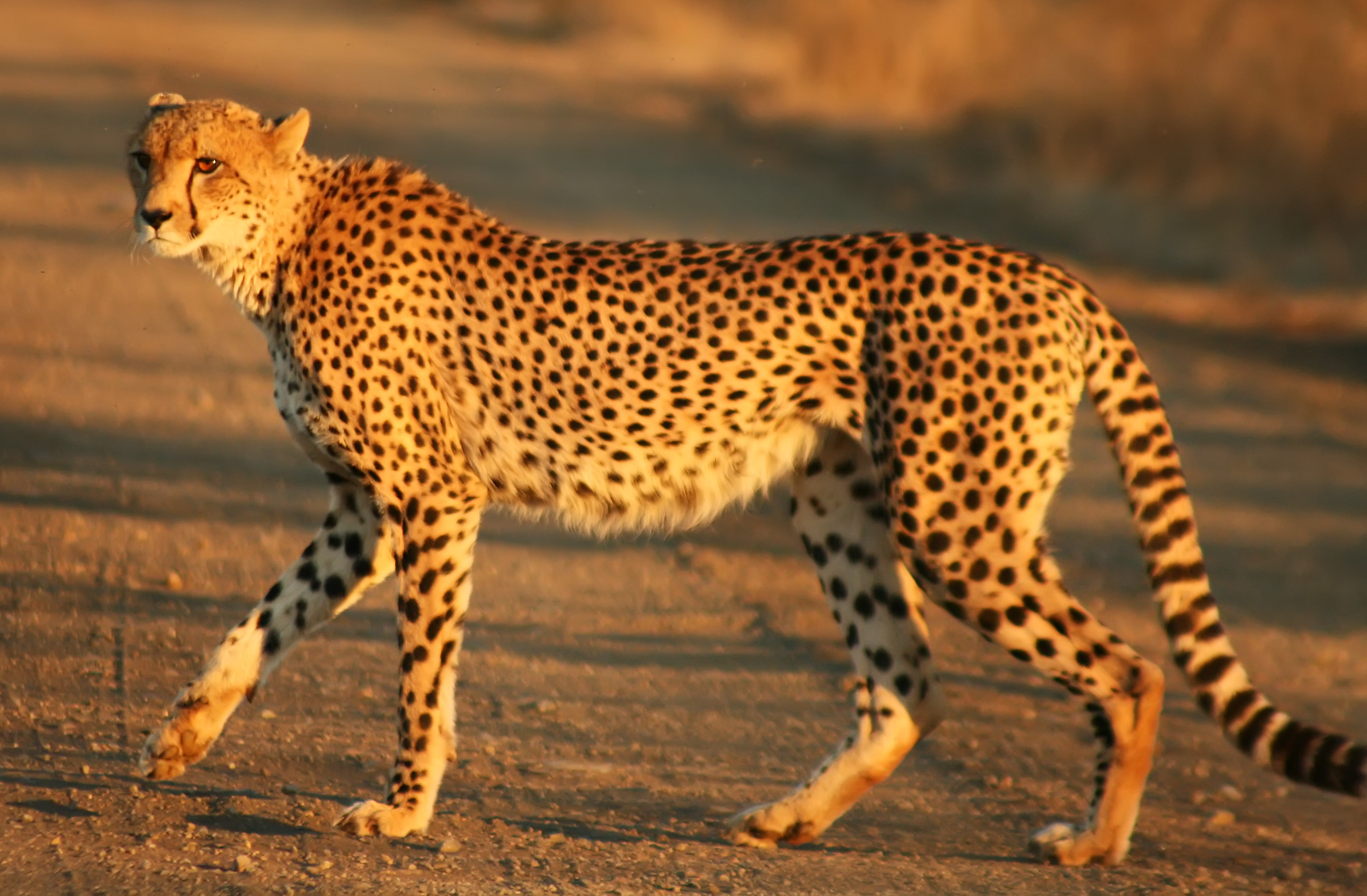
A cheetah in Kruger National Park, South Africa

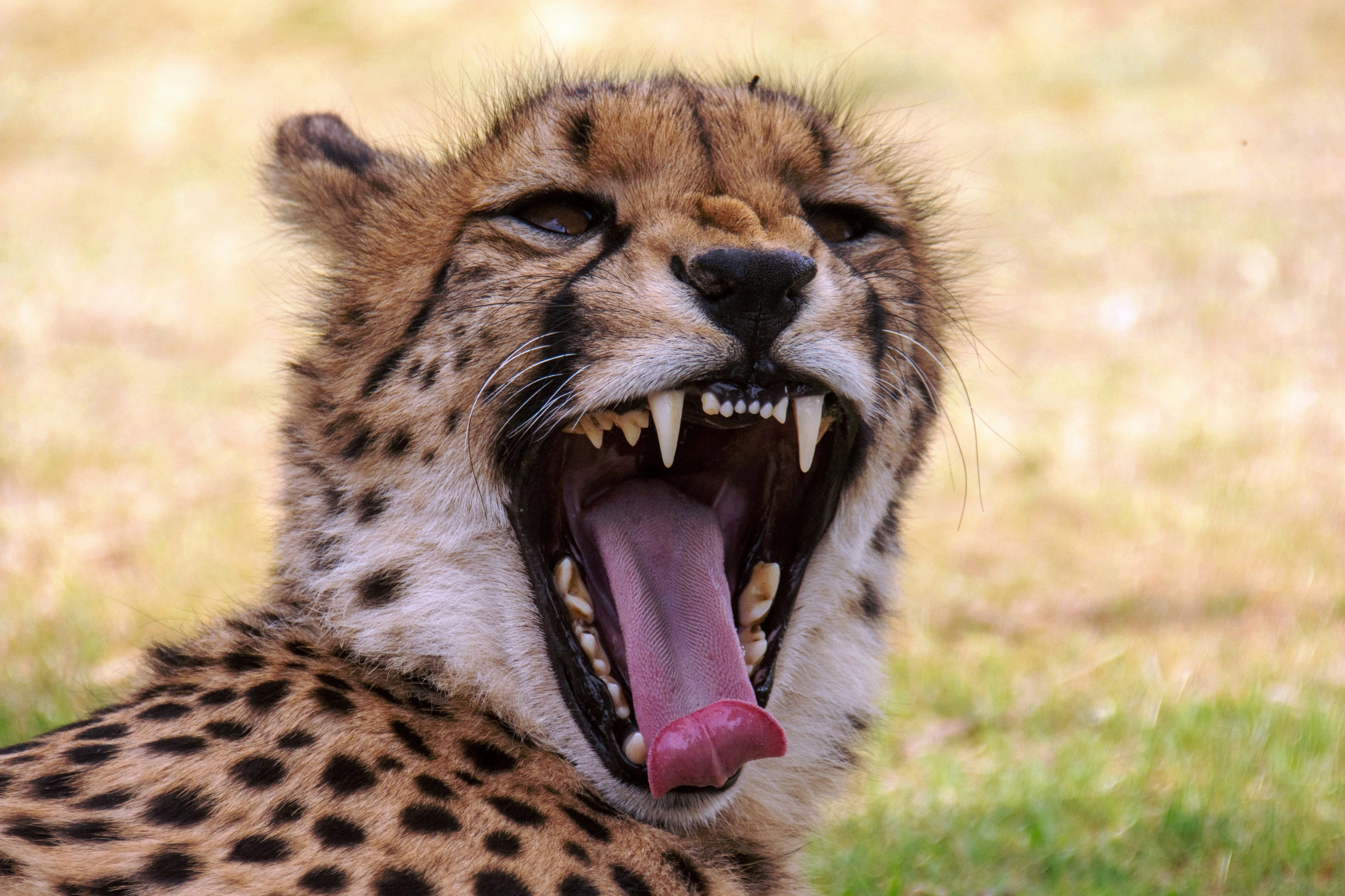
Teeth and tongue of a cheetah

The cheetah is a medium-sized cat. An adult male cheetah's total size can measure from 168 to 213 cm (66 to 84 in) and 162 to 200 cm (64 to 79 in) for females. Adult cheetahs are 70 to 90 cm (28 to 35 in) tall at the shoulder. Males are slightly taller than females and have slightly bigger heads with wider incisors and longer mandibles.

Measurements taken of wild cheetahs in Namibia indicate that the females range in head-and-body length from 113 to 140 cm (44 to 55 in) with 59.5 to 73.0 cm (23.4 to 28.7 in) long tails, and weigh between 21.0 and 63.0 kg (46.3 and 138.9 lb); males range in head-and-body length from 113 to 136 cm (44 to 54 in) with 60 to 84 cm (24 to 33 in) long tails, and weigh between 28.5 and 65.0 kg (62.8 and 143.3 lb).

The cheetah has a bright yellow or sometimes a golden coat, and its fur is slightly thicker than that of other subspecies. The white underside is very distinct, especially on the neck and breast, and it has less spotting on its belly. The spots on the face are more pronounced, and as a whole its spots seem more dense than those of most other subspecies. The tear marks are notably thicker at the corners of the mouth, and almost all of them have distinct brown mustache markings. Like the Asiatic cheetah, it is known to have fur behind its tail and have both white and black tips at the end of its tail. However, the cheetah may also have only a black tip at the end of its tail.

== Distribution and habitat ==
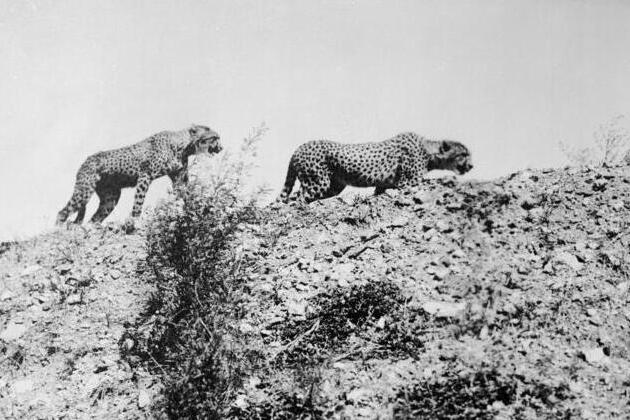
The Southeast African cheetah was one of the most widespread animals. These two cheetahs were photographed at southwestern South Africa between 1906 and 1918.

The Southeast African cheetah usually lives on grasslands, savannahs, scrub forests, and arid environments such as deserts and semidesert steppes. These cheetahs can be found in open fields, where they chase and hunt herbivorous mammals such as antelopes at a very high speed. In South Africa, the cheetah also prefers woodlands (in Kruger National Park), shrublands, high mountains, mountainous grasslands, and montane areas where favorable prey are mostly available.

The Southeast African cheetah is currently the most common subspecies and was widespread everywhere in southern to central Africa, ranging from South Africa to the southern Democratic Republic of the Congo (Katanga Province) and southern Tanzania. Its range is now greatly reduced, and it occurs in an area of 1,223,388 km^{2} (472,353 sq mi), 22% of its original range.

In the past, less than 10,000 cheetahs were hunted in Namibian farmlands. Previously estimated at mere 2,000 individuals since the 1990s, as of 2015, over 3,500 cheetahs live in Namibia today. The country maintains the largest population of wild cheetahs worldwide. About 90–95% of the cheetahs live on Namibian farmlands; others live in the Kalahari Basin, the coastal deserts of Namib and Kaokoveld, and the central to northeastern region of the country. Although Namibian cheetahs are mostly found outside of protected areas, they also live in Naankuse Wildlife Sanctuary, Namib-Naukluft National Park, and Bwabwata National Park. The cheetahs are rather uncommon in Etosha National Park and in Palmwag.

With an approximate population of 2,000 cheetahs as of 2016, Botswana has the second-largest population of cheetahs. They are mostly found in arid habitats of the Central Kalahari, Mokolodi Nature Reserve, and Kgalagadi Transfrontier Park (known as Gemsbok National Park in Botswana) in the south, and in the southwest and also in the northern region of the country that holds the largest prey base, such as in Okavango Delta, Chobe National Park, and Moremi Game Reserve. Khutse Game Reserve is also known to contain a high abundance of suitable prey base for cheetahs, such as springboks, gemsboks, and wildebeests. Cheetahs are rarely found in eastern Botswana and at the Zimbabwean border.

In South Africa, cheetahs live in the Limpopo, Mpumalanga, North West, and Northern Cape Provinces. After conservation efforts throughout the years, cheetahs have been reintroduced in the eastern, western, and southern parts, and recently in the Free State province of the country. Over 90% of the cheetah population is found outside protected areas such as game reserves and in farmlands. More than 412 cheetahs are in Kruger National Park, subpopulations of 300 to 350 in parks and reserves, and 400 to 500 free-roaming on farmlands in the Limpopo and North West Province, although the Kgalagadi Transfrontier Park is the stronghold for cheetahs. Kruger and Kalahari Gemsbok National Parks hold the largest populations; they are home to roughly 42% of South Africa's cheetahs. Cheetahs had not always been common in South Africa. As of now, the country contains the third-largest population of cheetahs after years of conservation actions and reintroductions into the wild. In 2016, it is estimated that about 1,500 adult cheetahs live in the wild.

The population of cheetahs has decreased dramatically in Zimbabwe, from about a thousand to 400, as of 2007. Currently, the Zimbabwean population is estimated at 165 individuals. Prior the population decline, cheetahs were more widespread in Zimbabwe, and its population had excellent growth rate, in which over 1,500 individuals thrived. Back in 1973, an estimated 400 cheetahs lived in Zimbabwe and had increased to 470 in 1987. Afterwards, in 1991, a total population of 1,391 cheetahs was found by the Zimbabwe Department of Parks and Wildlife Management, whilst in 1996, a population of 728 cheetahs lived on commercial farmlands alone. In 1999, a minimum total population of 1,520 was estimated, in which over 1,200 of these cheetahs lived on commercial farmlands, while 320 were found in national parks. A year later, several reports questioned whether the Zimbabwean cheetahs were stable or decreasing, but the population was increasing at the time. However, cheetahs are known to be highly threatened in farmlands, in which between 1999 and 2007, 80% of the population of Zimbabwean cheetahs living in private farmlands fell into massive decline due to human-cheetah conflict, reduced from over a thousand to less than 400 as of 2007. About 100 cheetahs were killed by livestock farmers in Zimbabwe's lowveld per year. Following years later, about 150 to 170 adult cheetahs are found there, and the human-cheetah conflict is no longer a major threat to the species. Most of the Zimbabwean cheetahs live in protected areas today. Cheetahs are mainly found in the southern to central regions. Isolated populations are found in northwestern Zimbabwe, such as Victoria Falls, Matetsi, and Kazuma Pan, also near the Mozambican border. Hwange National Park, the largest reserve with an area of 14,650 km^{2} (5,660 sq mi), is the main stronghold for the Zimbabwean cheetahs. Cheetahs also live in Matobo National Park. The cheetahs of the Zambezi Valley are nearly extinct, as only three individuals remain in Matusadona National Park and 9 in the Mana Pools National Park. Twenty-nine remain in the Zimbabwean lowveld, most of which live in Gonarezhou National Park, private reserves (Bubye, Save, Malilangwe, Nuanetsi), and at the Chilojo Cliffs.

In Zambia, cheetahs are mostly spotted at Matamene Camp of Liuwa Plain National Park in the Western Province. The national park is part of the Kavango–Zambezi Transfrontier Conservation Area. They are also present at the 5,000 km^{2} (1,900 sq mi) Kafue National Park, near the Kafue River and at the 22,400 km^{2} (8,600 sq mi) Sioma Ngwezi National Park (the second-largest park in Africa) in the southwest corner of Zambia. About 100 cheetahs live in the country.

In 2007, between 50 and 90 cheetahs were estimated to survive in Mozambique, where the species inhabits grasslands, savannahs, and mixed Acacia and mopane woodlands. Most habitats consist of wetlands and rivers. Historically, it was widespread in the country, but by 1975, the population had declined to about 200 individuals due to intense poaching during the Mozambican Civil War. Camera traps set up in 2004 and 2011 revealed constant presence of cheetahs, other predators and herbivores in Mozambique's conservation areas in Great Limpopo Transfrontier Park. Around 35 cheetahs live in Limpopo National Park. Cheetahs are also present in Zinave National Park and Banhine National Park, which are part of the Great Limpopo Transfrontier Park.

Apart from the central and northern regions, the now-rare cheetah lived in southern Tanzania. It ranged close to the Zambia/Malawi borders in the southwest to the southeasternmost part of the country. These cheetahs are found at Mpanga-Kipengere Game Reserve and the Uwanda Game Reserve. Whether or not they are extinct in Selous Game Reserve is unknown.

The indigenous population of cheetahs was extinct in Eswatini. In 1997, three cheetahs have been reintroduced into the Hlane Royal National Park, the largest (30,000 ha (300 km^{2})) protected area of Eswatini.

The cheetah was once thought to be extinct in Angola, but in 2010 two adult male cheetahs were spotted in the 16,000 km^{2} (6,200 sq mi) Iona National Park. It was the first time cheetahs had been sighted in the wild in Angola in 30 years. This protected area provides suitable habitat for the cheetah, as it has a large, open savannah where springbok and oryx occur.

In the 1980s, cheetahs occurred in three protected areas, namely Kasungu National Park, Nyika National Park and Vwaza Marsh Game Reserve, also at the Zambian border in the west. In 2007, the small cheetah population was considered locally extinct due to loss of suitable habitat and lack of prey.

=== Former range ===
In the early 20th century, African cheetahs were widespread across the continent, until they lost most of their range and disappeared from 23 countries. Cheetahs are locally extinct from Lesotho and the southern part of the Democratic Republic of the Congo. They used to live in the Katanga, southern Bandundu, southern Kasai-Occidental, and Bas-Congo. They probably extended to Kinshasa. It was previously estimated that about 100 to 500 cheetahs lived in the Congo between 1950-70s. Kundelungu National Park was one of the remaining strongholds for cheetahs after the recent extinction of cheetahs from Virunga National Park and Sudan cheetahs from Garamba National Park during the 1960s. Rumored sightings have been reported occasionally in the southern regions of the Congo, such as near the Angolan border, around the Sandoa Territory and on the Kibara Plateau of Upemba National Park. To this day, Upemba is still considered the only national park in the country to contain cheetah populations.

== Ecology and behavior ==
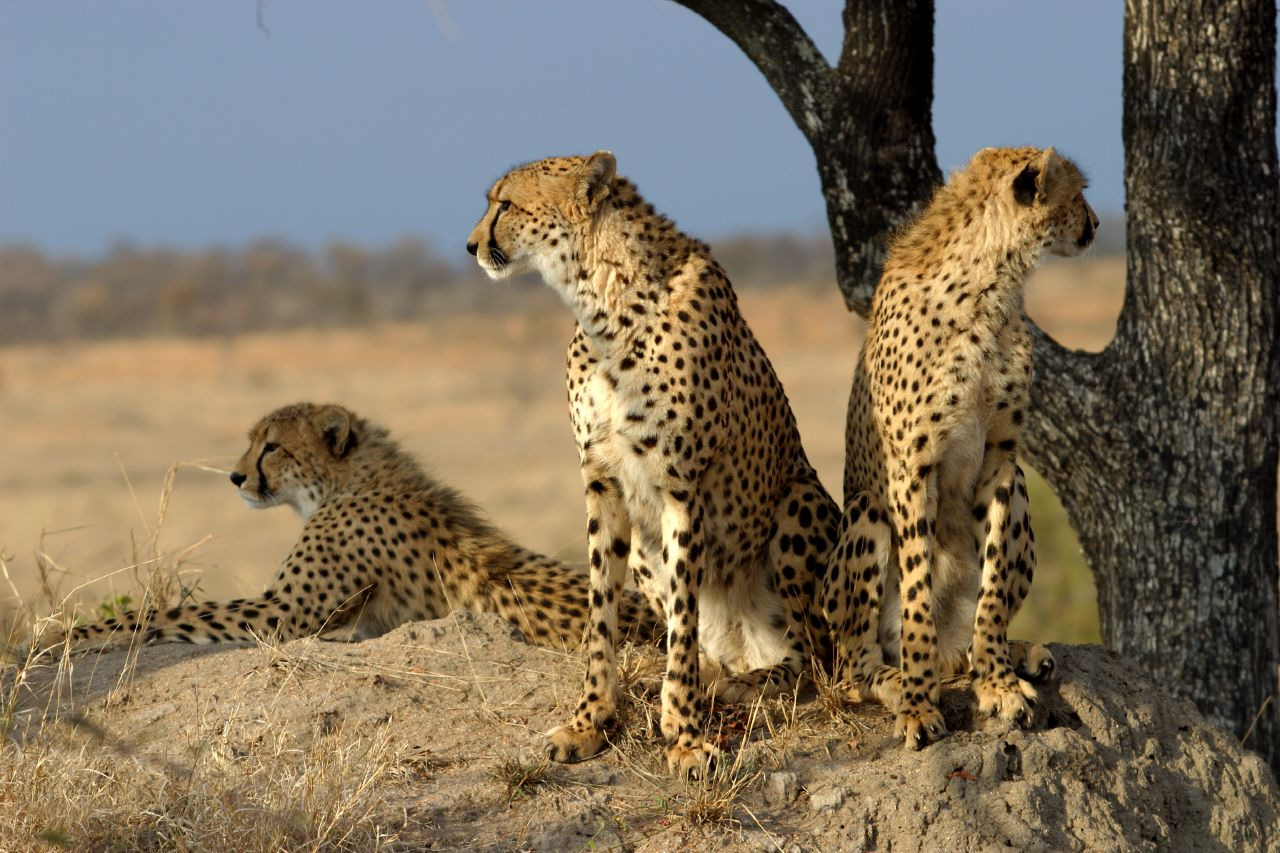
Three males at Sabi Sand Game Reserve, South Africa

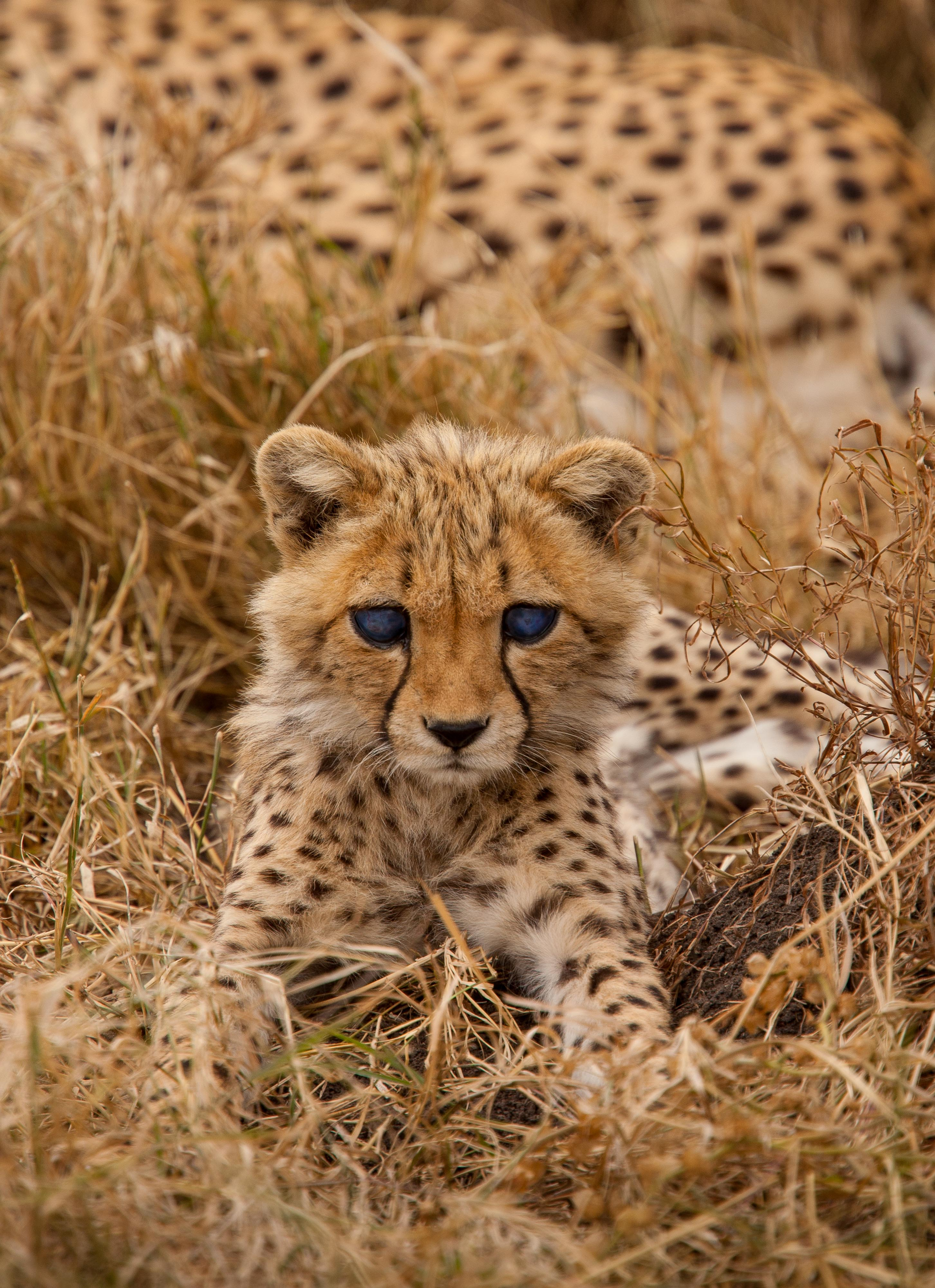
A cheetah cub

=== Reproduction and lifecycle ===
Male cheetahs are sociable and may live in a group with other male siblings. Males establish their territories by marking their territories by urinating on trees or termite mounds.

The females, though, are not sociable and do not establish a territory. They are solitary and avoid each other. However, they may live with their mothers, daughters, or sisters on their home ranges. The female's home range size can depend on the prey base. Cheetahs in southern African woodlands have ranges as small as 34 km^{2} (13 sq mi), while in some parts of Namibia, they can reach 1,500 km^{2} (580 sq mi).

Female cheetahs can reproduce at 13 to 16 months of age and have a typical age of sexual maturity between 20 and 23 months. The gestation can last for 90 to 95 days. Cub births mostly occur from November to January in Namibia and from November to March in Zambia. Females hunt solo, except that the cheetah cubs accompany their mothers to learn how to hunt on their own after the age of 5–6 weeks. After the cubs reach 18 months of age, the mother leaves her cubs, and the siblings remain as a group for a few months until the sisters leave the group and the brothers stay together. The male cubs may form alliances with other males after separating from their mother.

=== Hunting and diet ===
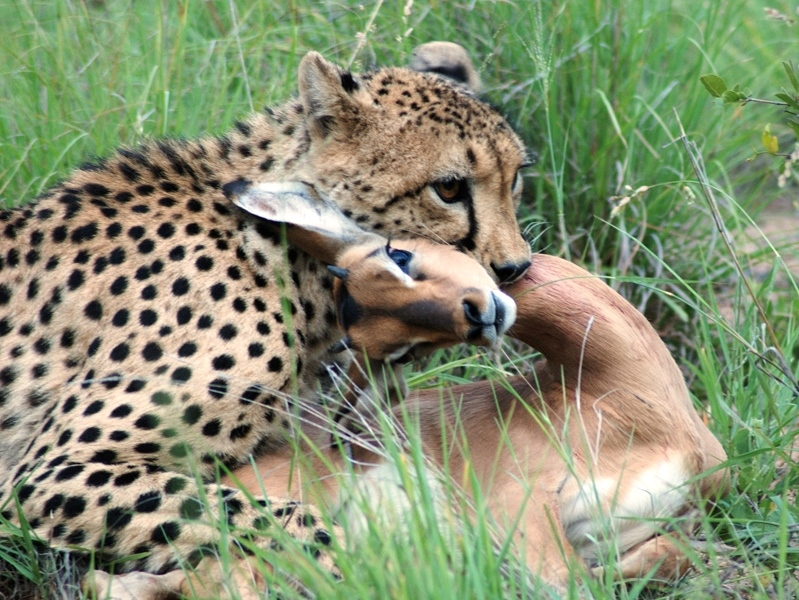
A cheetah suffocating an impala in Timbavati, South Africa

The cheetah is a carnivorous mammal. It preys on medium-sized and large antelopes, and fast, small animals including Cape hares and rodents. It prefers Thomson's gazelle, impala, kudu, puku, oribi, springbok, gemsbok, steenbok, wildebeest, warthog, red hartebeest, nyala and other ungulates.

=== Enemies and competitors ===
Like other cheetahs, they are threatened and outranked by larger predators in their area. They are threatened by lions, leopards, painted dogs, and hyenas, as they can steal their carcasses and kill them if given the chance. The cheetahs surrender their meals to spotted hyenas. However, coalitions of male adult cheetahs can chase predators away, and a single cheetah can chase jackals and lone wild dogs away.

== Threats ==
The Southern cheetah is a vulnerable subspecies, due to poaching, habitat loss, and lack of prey. Indiscriminate capture and removal of wild cheetahs in southern Africa continue to threaten the survival of this species, as it may reduce the genetic diversity in the wild, and they breed poorly in captivity. Its survival is also threatened by inbreeding. In Botswana, the cheetahs are mostly threatened by habitat changes.

The cheetah was also highly threatened by hunting and range loss. In the early 1930s, the cheetahs were hunted down and almost went extinct in South Africa. Therefore, it has lost most of its range, mostly in South Africa and Mozambique. Only a few dozen of them live in the southern part of Mozambique. It also disappeared from many regions of South Africa, only living in the northern and northeastern parts of the country.

During the 1970s, 9,500 cheetahs were killed in Namibian farmlands. As a protected species in Namibia, people are allowed to remove Namibian cheetahs only if they pose a threat to livestock or human life. Unfortunately, farmers might capture Namibian cheetahs, often removing or killing those that have not taken any livestock. About 90% of the Namibian cheetah population lives on farmlands.

In Botswana, the cheetah is protected under the Conserved Animal legislation since 1968, which strictly limits hunting and capture. Before then, the decline of suitable prey caused the cheetahs to feed on livestock. About 50 cheetahs were previously hunted down by tribesmen each year to protect livestock.

Limited international trade in live animals and skins is permitted from Namibia, Zimbabwe, and Botswana.

== Conservation ==
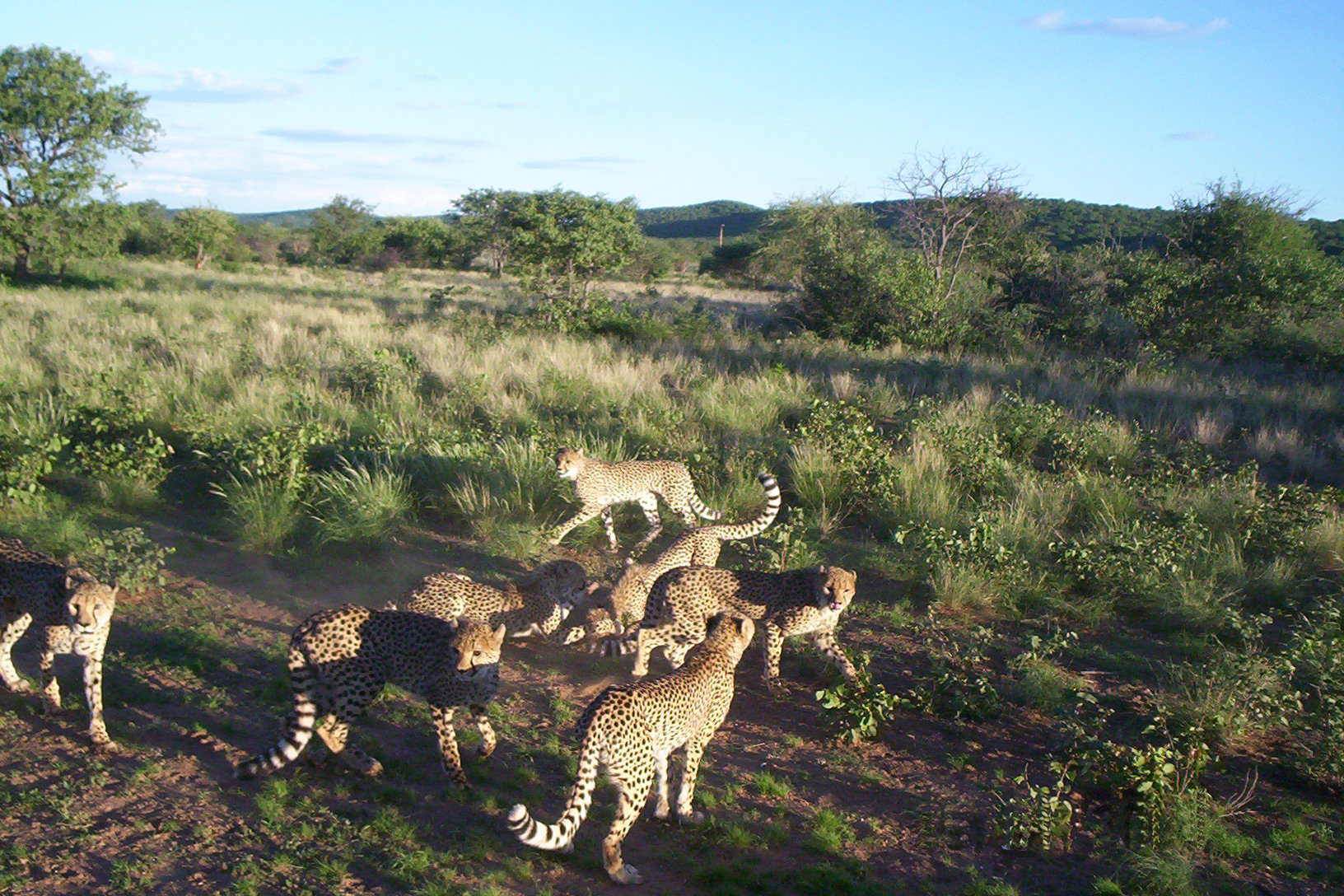
Cheetahs of the Cheetah Conservation Fund, Namibia

Cheetah populations
Country	Estimate
Angola	24 as of 2017
Botswana	956
Malawi	25–30
Mozambique	9 as of 2017
Namibia	1,200–1,500
South Africa	1,300
Eswatini	>1
Tanzania	500–1,000 (Note: older estimates, recent numbers for Cheetahs in Tanzanias are yet to be published)
Kenya	1,250–1,458 as of 2017
Zambia	78 as of 2017
Zimbabwe	132 as of 2017
Total	5,711-7,279

Previously estimated at a population of 4,190 individuals in Southern Africa since 2007, the total population of the Southern cheetah has likely reached over 6,000 individuals, with Namibia having the largest cheetah population worldwide. Since 1990, the population was estimated to be about 2,500 individuals in Namibia; by 2015, the cheetah population had increased to more than 3,500 in the country. Botswana contains the second-largest population of cheetahs – in 2007, an estimated population of 1,800. However, in 2016, about 2,000 cheetahs were in Botswana, which is about 20% of the world's cheetahs. Around 550 to 850 cheetahs were left in South Africa in 2007. After many conservation efforts, the cheetah population has increased to more than 1,000. In 2013, the estimated population was between 1,200 and 1,300 cheetahs in South Africa. Whilst an estimated that 1,500 adult cheetahs live in South Africa since 2016, the Endangered Wildlife Trust stated that the total population ranges between 1,166 and 1,742 cheetahs in South Africa alone in 2017. In Zimbabwe, on the contrary, the cheetahs' population has severely declined, from more than 1,500 cheetahs since 1999 to 400 cheetahs in 2007, to between 150 and 170 cheetahs as of 2015. In 2007, around 100 individuals remained in Zambia and between 50 and 90 were left in Mozambique.

The cheetahs are known to be poor breeders in captivity, though several organizations, such as the De Wildt Cheetah and Wildlife Centre, have succeeded in breeding high numbers of cheetah cubs. In 2009, the centre bred more than 800 cubs.

== Reintroduction projects ==
=== In Africa ===
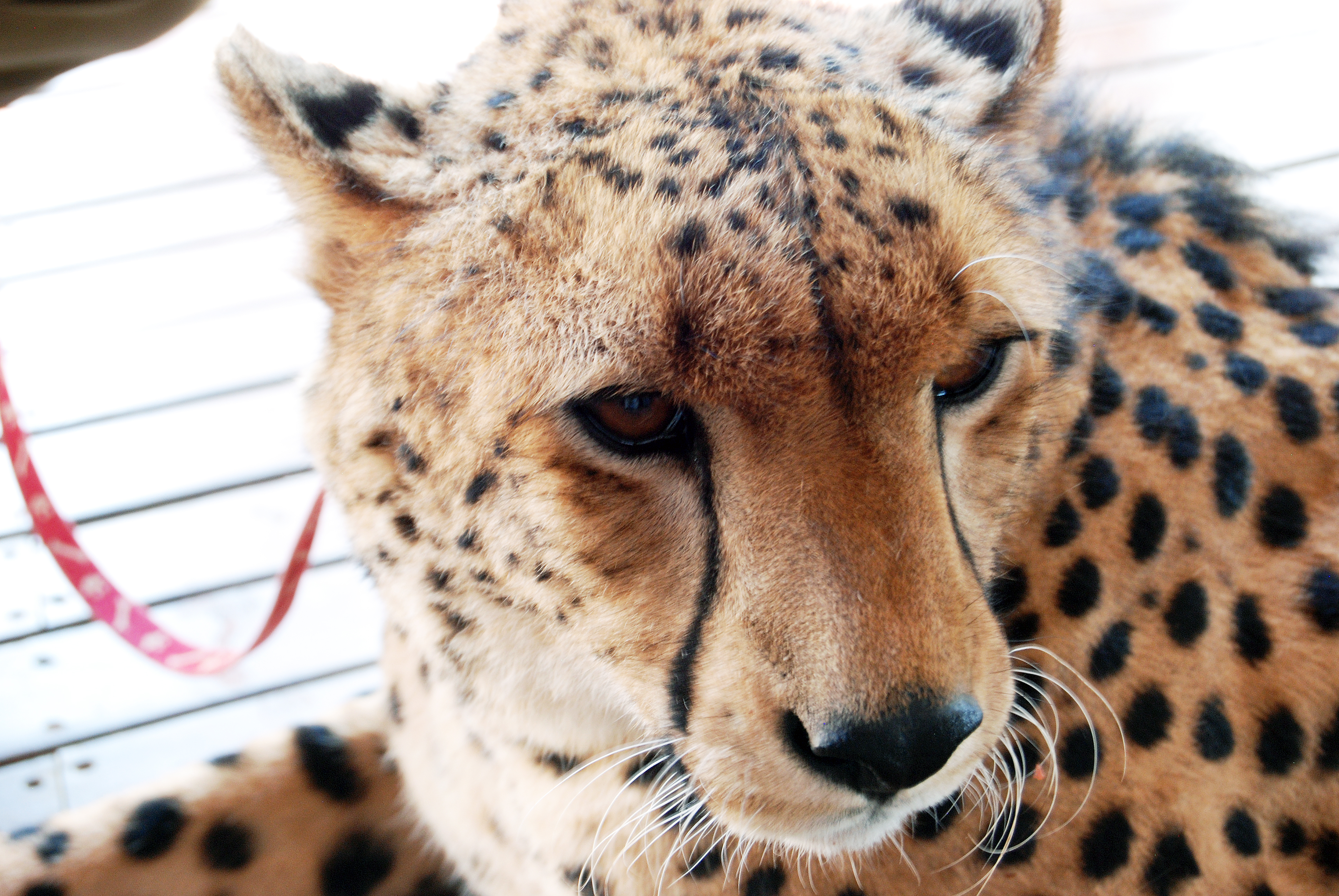
An orphan cheetah set to be reintroduced to Victoria Falls, Zimbabwe

==== South Africa ====
The cheetah once occurred in several areas of Southern Africa, but not commonly in South Africa.

The species lives mostly in the eastern and northern locations of South Africa. Since the 1960s, the cheetah had been imported from Namibia, which used to contain healthy populations of cheetahs at the time, and has been reintroduced to their former ranges and in small reserves. About 29% of the cheetah population was indigenously from South Africa whilst 71% was those imported from Namibia. The first known reintroductions were in KwaZulu Natal, Gauteng, Lowveld, Eastern Cape, Western Cape, and Southern Kalahari. There are currently 1,500 mature cheetahs within the country.

In December 2003, after the cheetahs were heavily hunted in the Great Karoo and Eastern Cape areas to extinction 125 years ago, cheetahs have returned to the Karoo, starting with a severely injured female wild-born cheetah named Sibella (circa 2001 – 11 September 2015) that went through surgery at the De Wildt Cheetah and Wildlife Trust and was later reintroduced to Samara Private Game Reserve. The reintroduction process was a success. Sibella was a capable hunter and successfully raised 18 cubs. About 2% of the wild population of cheetahs in South Africa occurs in that region. The cheetahs living in Samara are also in better condition; threats from apex predators such as lions and hyenas no longer exist. Sibella's youngest daughter Chilli gave birth to the first third-generation cheetah cubs of the Samara Private Game Reserve in January 2017.

A National Cheetah Metapopulation Project was launched in 2011 by the Endangered Wildlife Trust. Its purpose is to develop and co-ordinate a national metapopulation management plan for cheetahs in smaller fenced reserves in South Africa. For instance, the cheetahs have been reintroduced in around 50 of these South African reserves. Fragmented subpopulations of cheetahs are currently increasing to a few hundred. As of July 2014, further plans exist to reintroduce the cheetahs in six more small fenced reserves over the next few years.

For the first time after 100 years of extinction since the colonial period, the cheetah has recently been reintroduced into the Free State in 2013, with two male wild cheetahs that have been relocated from the Eastern Cape's Amakhala Game Reserve to the Free State's Laohu Valley Reserve, where the critically endangered South China tiger from Save China's Tigers (SCT) are part of a rewilding project in South Africa. A female cheetah has yet to be reintroduced to Laohu Valley. In early 2016, an adult female was reintroduced to the reserve. Three wild cheetah cubs were born for the first time in Laohu Valley Reserve in February 2017, making them the first cheetahs born in the wild since their disappearance from the Free State province in over a century. With three mature individuals and three cubs, six cheetahs are in Laohu Valley Reserve.

In 2016, a reintroduction and rewilding project known as Rewilding iSimangaliso for cheetahs is going on in iSimangaliso situated in KwaZulu-Natal province, including lions and Cape wild dogs, which were first introduced in late 2013. The 15 collared resident cheetahs in uMkhuze Game Reserve are seen by visitors during game drives.

==== Malawi ====
In May 2017, two male and two female cheetahs were imported from South Africa and reintroduced to Liwonde National Park.

==== Zambia ====
Since 1989, only a few cheetahs had been recorded at the Lower Zambezi National Park, despite the area being apparently suitable habitat for cheetahs. Chiawa Camp, in association with National Parks and Wildlife and Japan Aid, approached the Cheetah Conservation Fund for a study group to assess the suitability of Lower Zambezi. In October 1994, reintroduction attempts were made with three cheetahs to the Lower Zambezi. However, the reintroduction project had been unsuccessful, as two of them were killed by traps; one survivor remained for three years alone. Further plans exist to reintroduce the cheetah to the Lower Zambezi.

=== India ===
Multiple suitable potential sites in the Indian states of Gujarat, Madhya Pradesh, and Rajasthan, which consisted of forests, grasslands, savannahs, and deserts, were chosen for the cheetah reintroduction project in India, such as Banni Grasslands Reserve, Desert National Park, Kuno National Park, and Gajner Wildlife Sanctuary. They are also known to be where the Asiatic cheetahs and other native animals coexisted for several years until they recently went extinct in the region. Nauradehi Wildlife Sanctuary was chosen as the most suitable site for reintroduced Namibian cheetahs.

However, the plan to introduce this subspecies to India was suspended in 2012, after discovering the distinctness between the cheetahs from Asia and Africa, having been separated between 32,000 and 67,000 years ago.

In 2020, the Supreme Court of India ruled that African cheetahs, a different subspecies, could be brought into the country at a "carefully chosen location" on an experimental basis.

In 2022, India received eight cheetahs from Namibia, and they were released in Kuno National Park in Madhya Pradesh state. In 2023, South Africa signed an agreement with India to introduce 12 African cheetahs to India each year over the next decade. As of 22 March 2023, four Southeast African cheetahs were introduced to Kuno National Park.

== In captivity ==
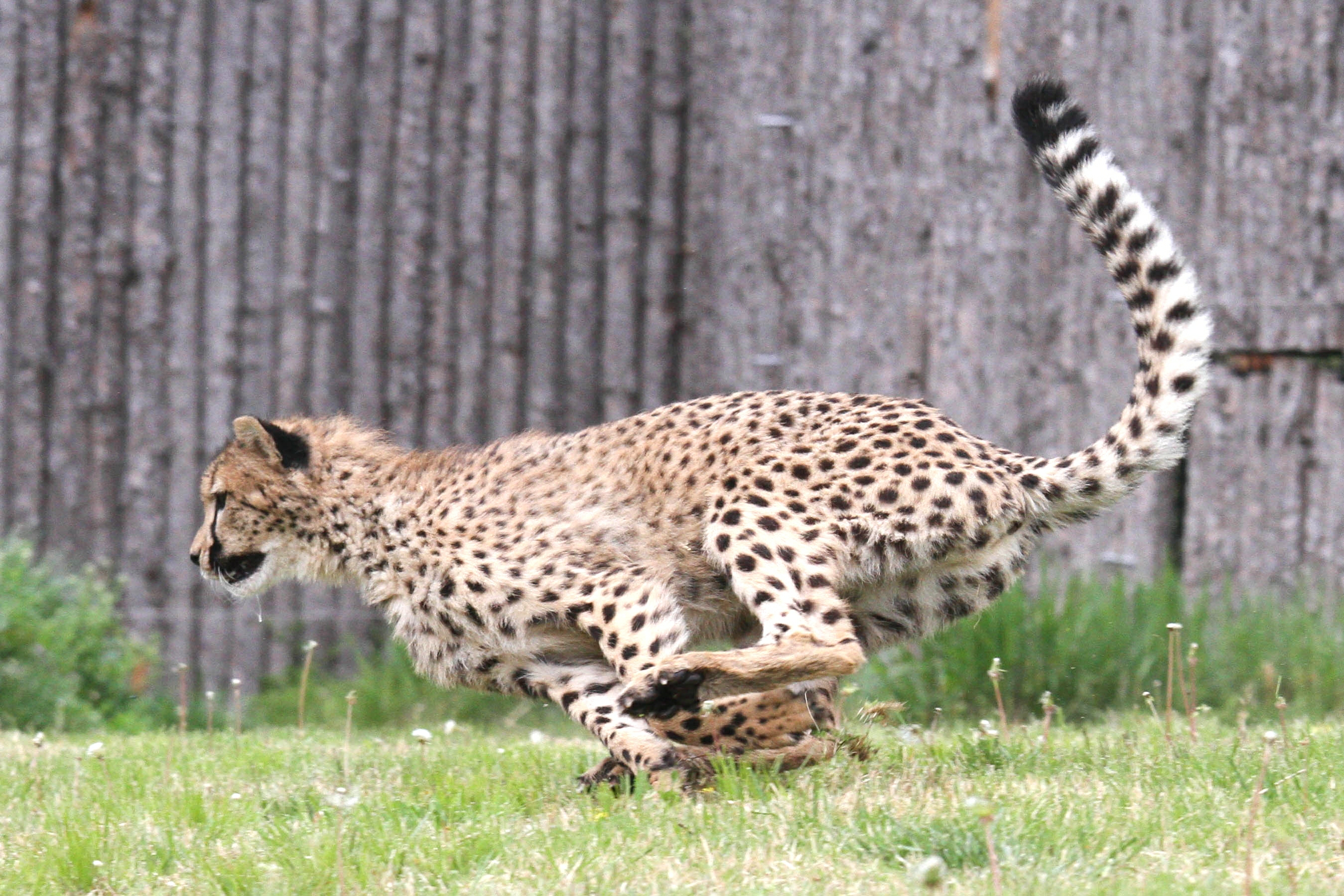
A cheetah in Cincinnati Zoo and Botanical Garden, Ohio, United States

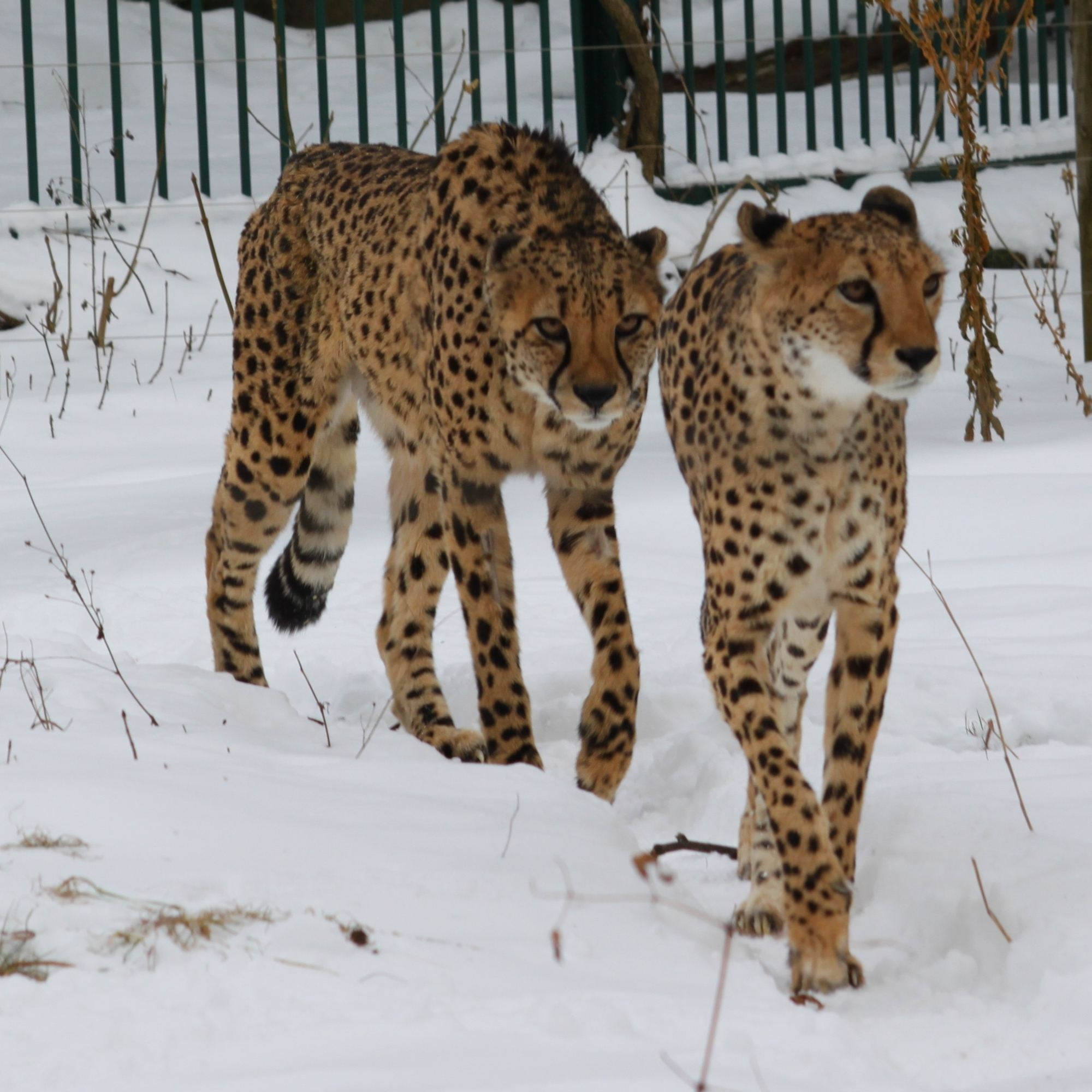
Cheetahs and other captive animals are able to live in cold climates, as demonstrated by these cheetahs at Tiergarten Schönbrunn, Austria

Cheetahs are known to be difficult to breed in captivity because of their social behaviors and breeding problems. Cub mortality in captivity and in the wild is high at about 50%. On average, 30% of all captive-bred cubs born in captivity may die within a month.

The Southern cheetah is the most widespread subspecies breeding in captivity around the world, while Sudanese cheetahs are found only in a few European and Middle Eastern zoos and wildlife centers. The subspecies is found in various zoos worldwide in America, Africa, Eurasia, and Australia.

Several zoos, facilities, breeding centers, and wildlife parks part of the American (Species Survival Plan, Association of Zoos and Aquariums) and Eurasian (European Endangered Species Programme, European Association of Zoos and Aquaria) captive-breeding programs have been successfully increasing populations of cheetahs, such as White Oak Conservation from Yulee, Florida, the Wildlife Safari from Winston, Oregon, that bred more than 178 cheetahs and the De Wildt Cheetah and Wildlife Centre from South Africa where hundreds of cheetah cubs have been born. The Fota Wildlife Park from Ireland is also known for successfully breeding cheetahs in captivity right before starting a captive-breeding project with the Northeast African cheetah.

== In popular culture ==
- The book How It Was with Dooms tells the true story of a family raising an orphaned East African cheetah cub named Duma (the Swahili word for cheetah) in Kenya. The films Cheetah (1989) and Duma (2005) were both loosely based on this book. However, Duma takes place in South Africa instead of Kenya. The cheetahs that starred in the film were South African cheetahs from the Kragga Kamma Game Park of the Eastern Cape province. In November 2011, one of the five adult cheetahs that starred in the film died from an unusual kidney failure.
- The Toyota Free State Cheetahs, founded in 1895, is a South African rugby union team that participates in the annual Currie Cup tournament. They have a cheetah running at high speed as their emblem.
- The Cheetahs are another South African rugby union team from Bloemfontein founded in 2005 that have a running cheetah as their emblem.

== See also ==
- Asiatic cheetah
- Northwest African cheetah
- Northeast African cheetah
- Big cat
