= Breeding program =

Planned breeding of a group of animals or plants

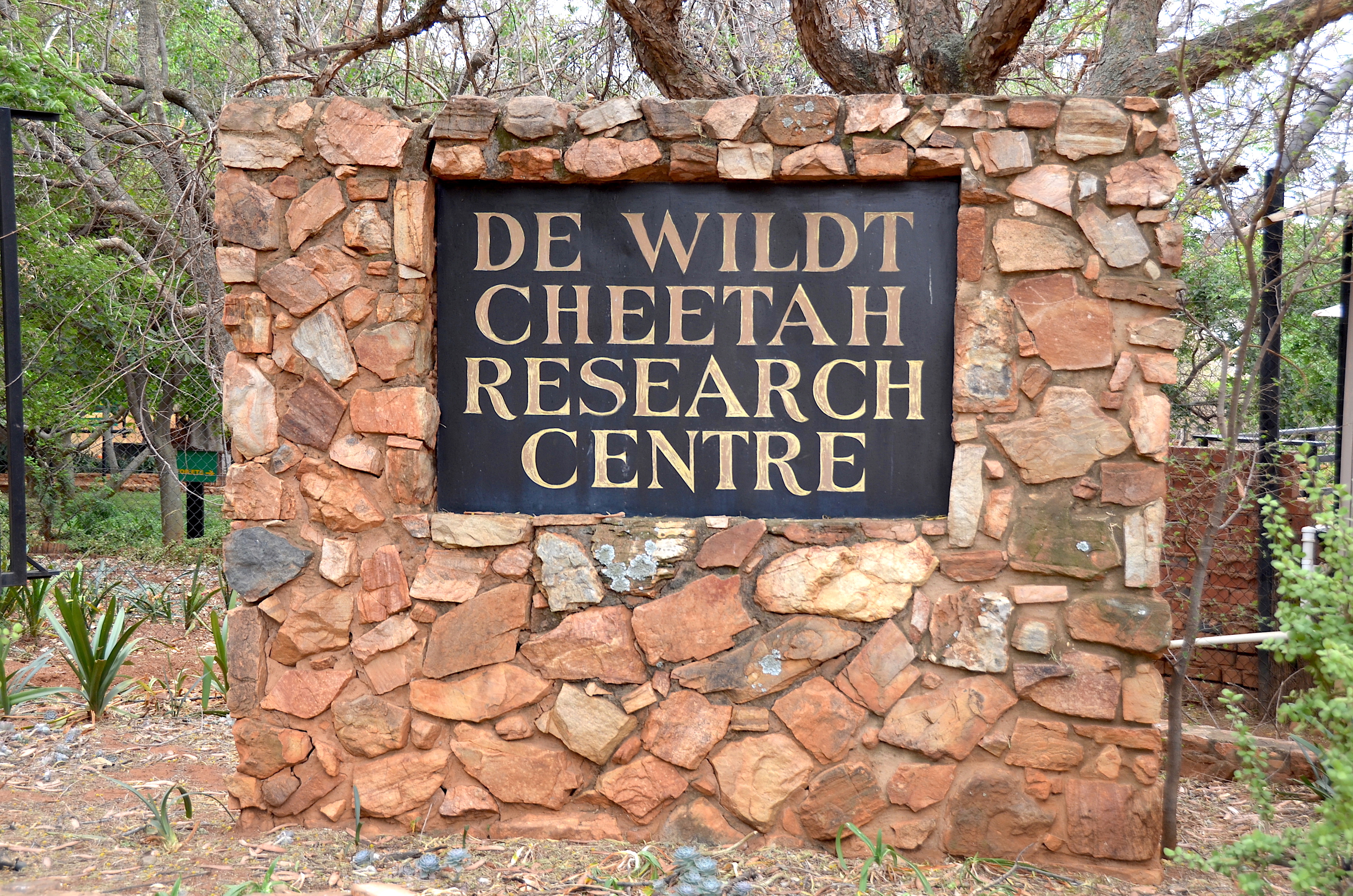
Entrance of De Wildt Cheetah and Wildlife Centre in South Africa. Breeding programs play a role in the conservation and preservation of the cheetah and the African wild dog

A breeding program is the planned breeding of a group of animals or plants, usually involving at least several individuals and extending over several generations. There are a couple of breeding methods, such as artificial (which is man made) and natural (it occurs on its own).

According to the Dutch State Secretary of Economic Affairs the delivery of young animals is important for the natural behavior of the mother, the herd and is desirable from a veterinary perspective.

Breeding programs are commonly employed in several fields where humans wish to change the characteristics of their animals' offspring through careful selection of breeding partners:

- Dog and cat fanciers may coordinate a breeding program to raise the probability of an animal's litter producing a championship-caliber animal.
- Horse breeders try to produce fast racehorses through breeding programs.
- Conservationists use breeding programs to try to help the recovery of endangered species by preserving the existing gene pool and preventing inbreeding.
- There also can be breeding programs for plants. For instance, a winery owner, seeking to find a better tasting wine, could design a breeding program so that only the vines whose grapes make the very best wine are allowed to breed.

== See also ==
- Animal husbandry
- Captive breeding
- European Endangered Species Programme
- Ex-situ conservation
- Eugenics
- Selective breeding
