= Litsitsirupa Private Nature Reserve =

Nature reserve in South Africa

Coordinates: 25°21′48″S 028°34′37″E

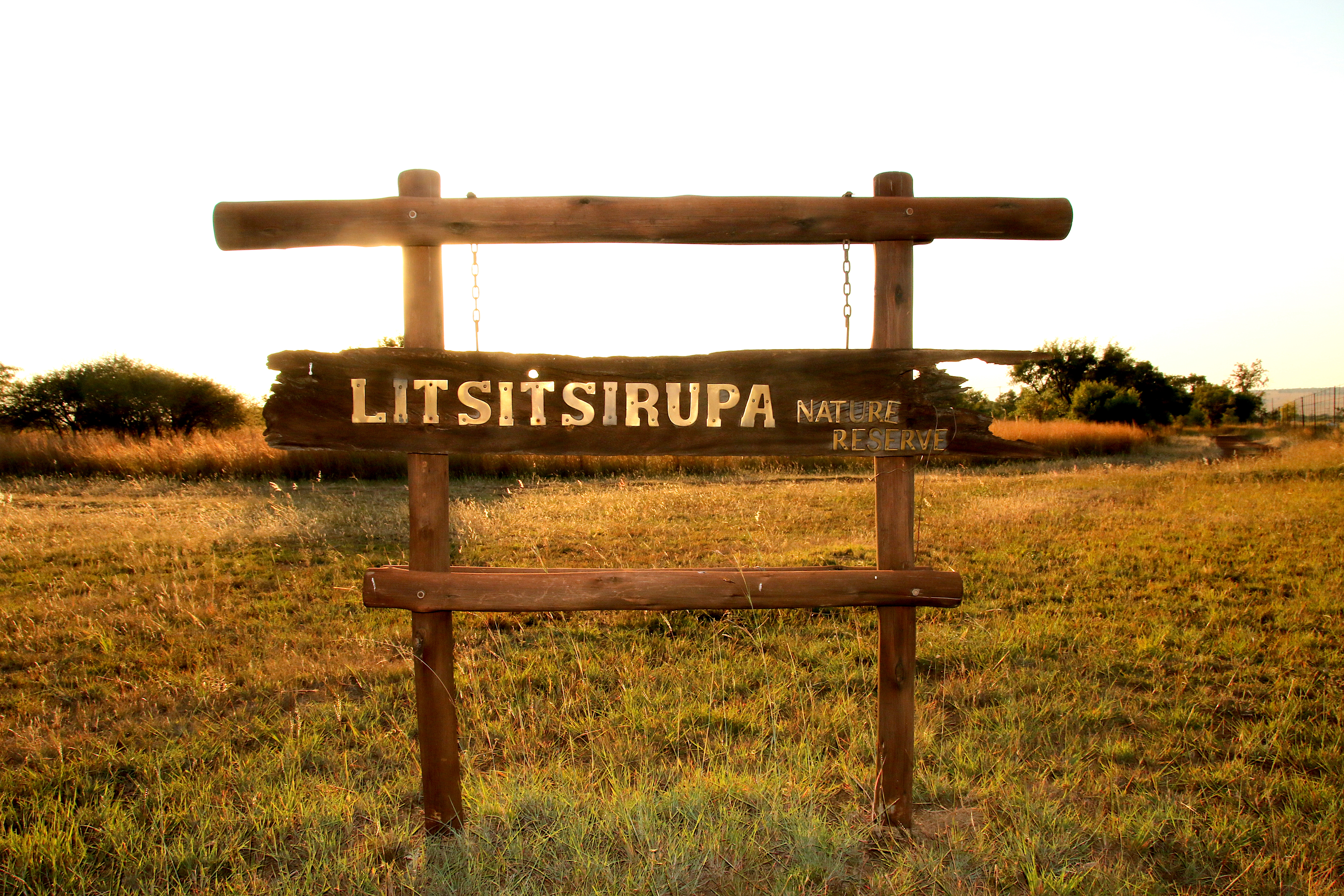
Litsitsirupa Private Nature Reserve Entrance (2019)

The Litsitsirupa Private Nature Reserve is a nature reserve 70 km (43 mi) north-east of Pretoria. Fences of 13 former farms were removed to develop a park where wild animals may freely move on an area of approximately 400 ha (990 acres). It includes zebra, impala, kudu, blue wildebeest, giraffe, and more.
