= Zinave National Park =

National park in Mozambique

- IUCN category II (national park)
- Location within Mozambique
- Location: Mozambique
- Coordinates: 21.577315°S 33.52787°E
- Area: 4,000 square kilometres (1,500 sq mi)
- Established: June 26, 1973

The Zinave National Park (Parque Nacional do Zinave or PNZ) is a protected area in Mabote District of Inhambane Province, Mozambique, created by decree on 26 June 1973.

== Land ==
The park extends to the south of the Save River in Inhambane Province, covering an area of 4,000 square kilometres (1,500 sq mi). It was first proclaimed as a hunting area in 1962, run by Mozambique Safariland, and was promoted to a national park in 1972. The area represents a transition between the wet and dry tropical areas and has an annual rainfall of about 800 millimetres (31 in) or less.

The highest elevation is on the southeast boundary at 174 metres (571 ft) above sea level. The land slopes down in a north-northeasterly direction to its lowest elevation of 110 metres (360 ft) at the Save River. The soil is mostly sandy, with clay soils from alluvial sediments along the Save River. Mean annual rainfall is 690 millimetres (27 in) in the northeast, 571 millimetres (22.5 in) in the west. There are seasonal pans scattered throughout the PNZ, some quite large.

== Ecology ==
A 2010 report said that the PNZ had been neglected until recently, and most of its large wildlife had been destroyed by poaching. Species that are locally extinct or close to extinct include black rhinoceros, Cape buffalo, cheetah, reedbuck, eland, elephant, giraffe, Lichtenstein's hartebeest, roan antelope, sable antelope, spotted hyena, wildebeest and Selous' zebra.

The park has very diverse tree species and at least 41 species of grasses. The Save River channel is under water when the river is in flood, but at other times larger areas of sandbanks are exposed. The riverine forest is found on the banks and levees to the south of the river, with diverse trees reaching heights up to 20 metres (66 ft). Shifting cultivation has degraded this forest. Further from the river is Acacia nigrescens woodland, covering 10.5% of the PNZ, merging into mopane and miombo landscapes in the south. The mopane landscape is found on heavier soils and covers 37.5% of the park, dominated by mopane-dominated closed woodlands. A sandveld landscape, consisting of open woodlands on deep reddish sandy soils, covers 16.7% of the park. Finally, the miombo landscape covers 29.5% of the park in the higher, wetter southeastern section and includes open grasslands and wetlands.

Mid 2017 6,000 animals were donated to the National Park and will be translocated within three years.

== People ==
Sketch map of Great Limpopo Transfrontier Park, with Zinave in the northeast

As of 2010 about 4,200 people lived within the park boundaries practicing subsistence farming, mostly in the miombo landscape. Typically the farmers cut the branches from trees but leave the trunks standing. They burn the branches to form ash, which provides nutrients to the fields. After three or four years they abandon the field and move on, leaving the miombo to regenerate. Termite hills are also used to grow maize after being flattened, and the edges of pans are cultivated as they dry up each year.

A relatively small percentage of the park is cultivated, and environmental impact is probably low. The people selectively cut down trees for wood used to build houses and livestock pens and for carvings. They use grass for thatching, and strip the bark of trees to make beehives, causing the tree to die. They make extensive use of medicinal plants and fruits. Cattle and goats are herded within the park, but only in low numbers with light grazing.

== Plans ==
The park is part of the larger transfrontier conservation area surrounding the Great Limpopo Transfrontier Park, which also includes the Banhine National Park, the Massingir and Corumana areas and other linked regions in Mozambique, and a number of private and state-owned conservation areas bordering on the Transfrontier Park in South Africa and Zimbabwe. The Greater Limpopo Transfrontier Park project includes an initiative to rehabilitate the park. The landscapes are highly suitable for reintroducing the species that used to live there but were exterminated during the civil war. They will initially be introduced into sanctuaries to ensure their security.
