= Banhine National Park =

National park in Mozambique

- IUCN category II (national park)

- Location within Mozambique
- Location: Mozambique
- Coordinates: 22.748599°S 32.80848°E
- Area: 7,250 km^{2} (2,800 sq mi)
- Established: June 26, 1973
- Governing body: ANAC (Administração Nacional das Áreas de Conservação)

Banhine National Park is a protected area in northern Gaza Province, Mozambique. The park was established on 26 June 1973. In 2013 the limits of park were updated to better reflect the realities on the ground, particularly the human presence in the area.

== Location ==
The park is 7,250 square kilometres (2,800 sq mi) in area and holds extensive inland wetlands, acting as an important source of water to the dry lands that surround it. The park is in an area that has annual rainfall of only 430 millimetres (17 in). However, over 1% of the park is wetland and there are also more than a thousand pans that range in size from a few square meters to hundreds of hectares. These pans may be very salty or "sweet" and drinkable. The water comes from the area to the northwest near the Zimbabwe boundary, flowing through many channels into the wetlands and then into the Changane River.

Administratively, the park is split between Chicualacuala District (2,400 square kilometres (930 mi^{2})), Chigubo District (3,000 square kilometres (1,200 mi^{2})), and Mabalane District (1,600 square kilometres (620 mi^{2})).

== Fauna ==
18 species of fish have been found in the park. The African lungfish, two killifish species and two barbel species have developed ways to deal with predictable periods of drought. At times, the wetlands are completely dry on the surface.

The Banhine National Park used to be home to Cape buffalo, sable, common tsessebe, hartebeest, Selous' zebra, and blue wildebeest. Populations of many of these animals were destroyed during the civil wars of the 1980s and early 1990s. However, the park is still home to endangered wattled cranes and to many migratory birds. Results of an aerial survey in October 2004 showed that the park had healthy populations of ostrich, kudu, impala, reedbuck, duiker, steenbok, porcupine, warthog and oribi. Predators such as leopards, lions, servals, spotted hyenas and even cheetahs are also found in the national park.

== People ==
There is a small human population in the reserve, damaging the environment by slash-and-burn cultivation of maize, sorghum, cassava and sugar cane. With drought, the crops fail and the people revert to hunting and fishing, placing stress on the fauna. The government is encouraging people to move out of the park by building permanent water sources outside of the reserve and giving incentives for relation.

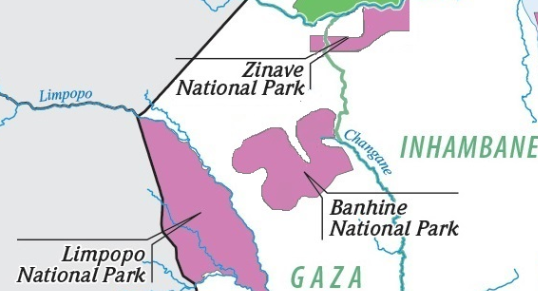
Banhine National Park (post 2013 borders)

However, in 2013, in recognition of the fact that many communities had resettled into the park, the borders were changed to reflect this fact and facilitate the management of the area as a wildlife haven.

== Plans ==
Sketch map of Great Limpopo Transfrontier Park

The Banhine, Zinave and Limpopo national parks in Mozambique, the Gonarezhou National Park in Zimbabwe and the Kruger National Park in South Africa are the basis for the Great Limpopo Transfrontier Park, part of the Great Limpopo Transfrontier Conservation Area that will link the Drakensberg Mountains in the west to the Save River Estuary in the east. The total protected area will exceed 95,624 square kilometres (36,921 sq mi).
