= Sengwe Safari Area =

Protected wilderness area in southeast Zimbabwe

Sengwe Safari Area is an area of protected wilderness in southeast Zimbabwe which forms a transnational corridor between Gonarezhou National Park in Zimbabwe and Kruger National Park in South Africa. It is part of the Great Limpopo Transfrontier Park.
