= Great Limpopo Transfrontier Park =

Transfrontier park in South Africa, Mozambique and Zimbabwe

Coordinates: 22°26′S 31°22′E

Sketch map of Great Limpopo Transfrontier Park

Great Limpopo Transfrontier Park is a 35,000 km^{2} (14,000 sq mi) peace park that is in the process of being formed. It will link the Limpopo National Park (formerly known as Coutada 16) in Mozambique, Kruger National Park in South Africa, Gonarezhou National Park, Manjinji Pan Sanctuary and Malipati Safari Area in Zimbabwe, as well as the area between Kruger and Gonarezhou, the Sengwe communal land in Zimbabwe and the Makuleke region in South Africa.

== History ==
The memorandum of understanding for the creation of the peace park was signed on November 10, 2000 as the Gaza-Kruger-Gonarezhou Transfrontier Park. In October 2001 the name was changed to the Great Limpopo Transfrontier Park. By the 5th World Parks Congress held in Durban, South Africa, in 2003 the treaty had not been ratified in Mozambique and Zimbabwe.

Fences between the parks have started to come down allowing the animals to take up their old migratory routes that were blocked before due to political boundaries.

On the October 4, 2001 the first 40 (including 3 breeding herds) of a planned 1,000 elephants were translocated from the over-populated Kruger National Park to the war-ravaged Limpopo National Park. It would take 2½ years to complete the translocation.

The new Giriyondo Border Post between South Africa and Mozambique started operating in March 2004.

There are new plans that should increase the size of the park to 99,800 km^{2} (36,000 sq. mi.).

== Park territories ==
- Great Limpopo Transfrontier Park
  - Kruger National Park about 18,989 km^{2} (7,332 sq mi) (Including private game farms that are Signatories to the Greater Limpopo Trans Frontier Co-operation Agreement (GLTFCA), e.g. Mjejane Game Reserve.)
  - Makuleke region (also see: Makuleke (tribe) and Makuleke) about 240 km^{2} (93 sq mi)
  - Limpopo National Park (Mozambique) about 10,000 km^{2} (3,900 sq mi)
  - Banhine National Park (Mozambique) about 7,000 km^{2} (2,700 sq mi)
  - Zinave National Park (Mozambique) about 6,000 km^{2} (2,300 sq mi)
  - Maputo Elephant Reserve (Mozambique) about 700 km^{2} (270 sq mi)
  - Gonarezhou National Park (Zimbabwe) about 5,053 km^{2} (1,951 sq mi)
  - Manjinji Pan Sanctuary (Zimbabwe)
  - Malipati Safari Area (Zimbabwe)
  - Sengwe Safari Area (Zimbabwe)

== Fauna ==
This park comprises a gamut of wildlife including mammals such as savannah elephant, southern white rhinoceros, South African giraffe, blue wildebeest, African leopard, Southeastern lion, Southern cheetah, mongoose and spotted hyena.

Since 2005, the protected area is considered a Lion Conservation Unit.
