= De Wildt Cheetah and Wildlife Centre =

Captive wildlife breeding facility in South Africa

Coordinates: 25.67372°S 27.9237°E

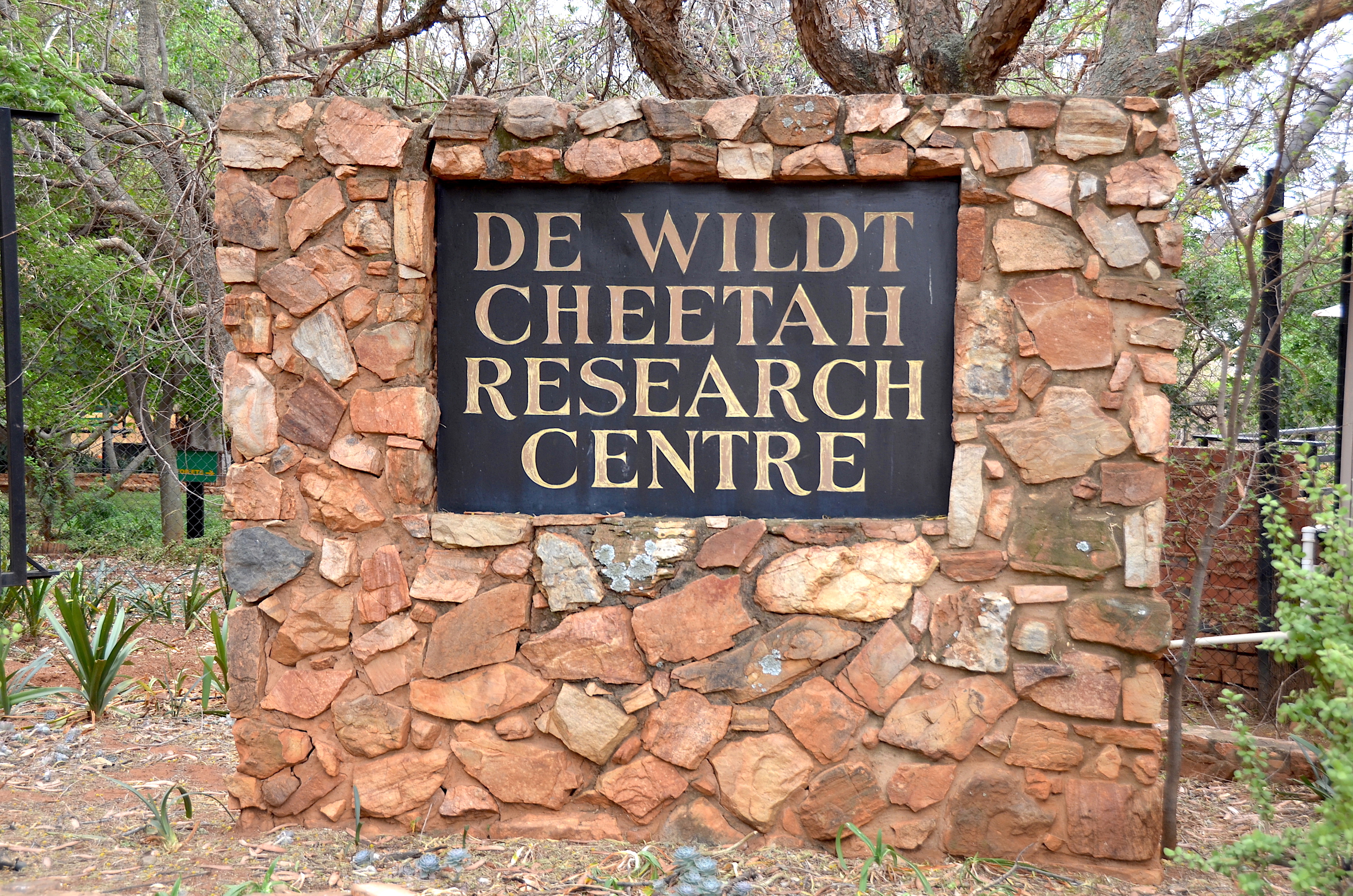
Entrance of De Wildt Cheetah Research Centre

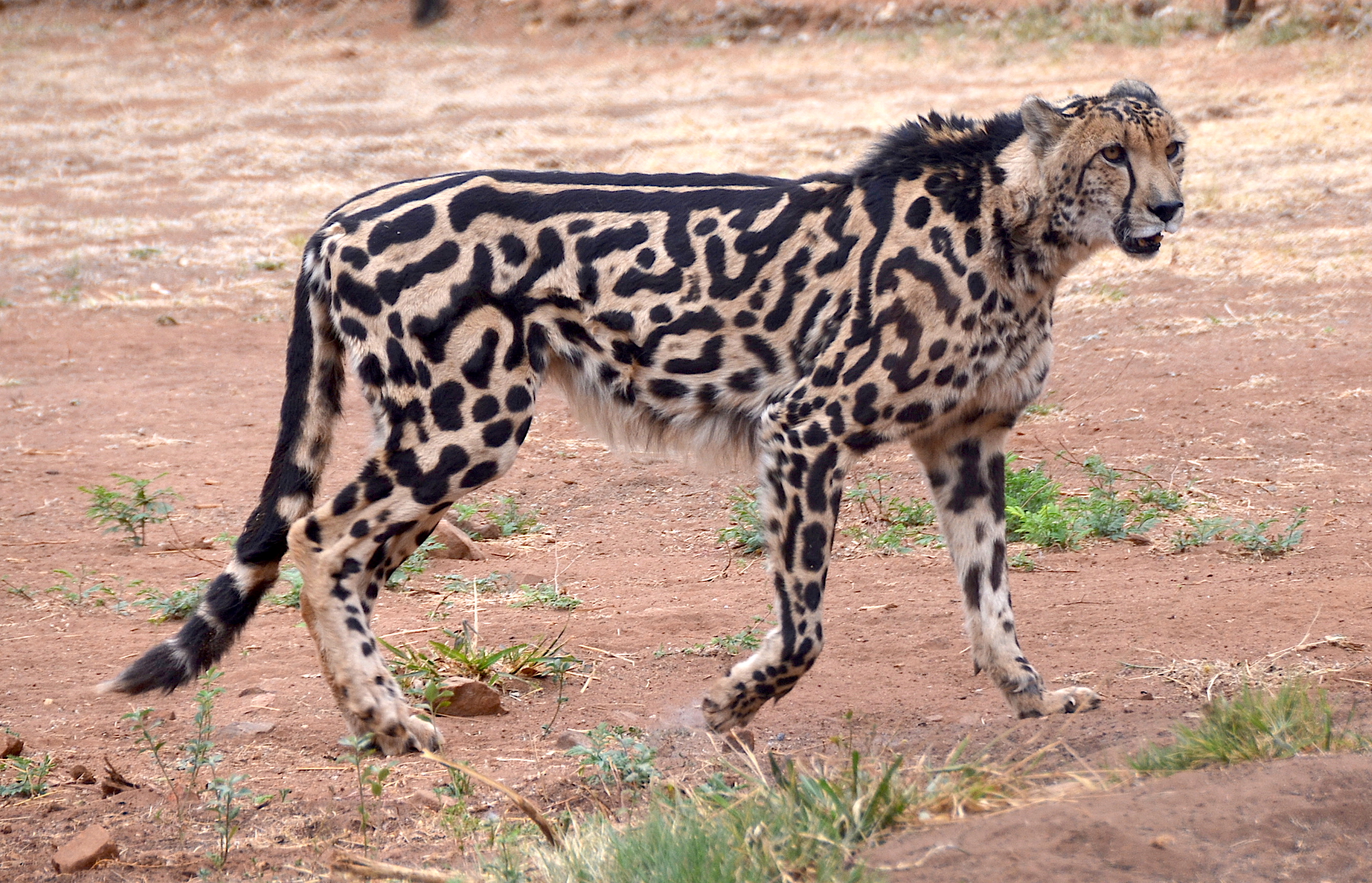
King cheetah at De Wildt Cheetah Research Centre

The De Wildt Cheetah and Wildlife Centre, also known as Ann van Dyk Cheetah Centre is a captive breeding facility for South African cheetahs and other animals that is situated in the foothills of the Magaliesberg mountain range (near Brits and the Hartbeespoort Dam) in the North West Province of South Africa.

== History ==
The centre is situated on what was originally Van Dyk's parent's chicken farm, which they acquired in 1950. Due to her compassionate nature, Ann soon had a collection of stray and injured animals on the farm. Then, in October 1968, a local farmer offered her two cheetah cubs, which she accepted.

However, the cubs had been acquired without the necessary permits and, when they enquired about obtaining these permits, the cubs were confiscated and sent to the National Zoological Gardens of South Africa in Pretoria.

Meanwhile, the Zoo had already established a successful captive breeding programme, but further expansion was limited due to the lack of land available in its urban setting. Consequently, they had been considering acquiring a more rural breeding site.

Ann and her eldest brother, Godfrey, thus offered to the Zoo management the use of their facilities for captive breeding programmes. This offer was accepted and the centre officially opened on 16 April 1971.

Ann van Dyk received a gold medal from the South African Nature Foundation in 1988.

== Other breeding programmes ==
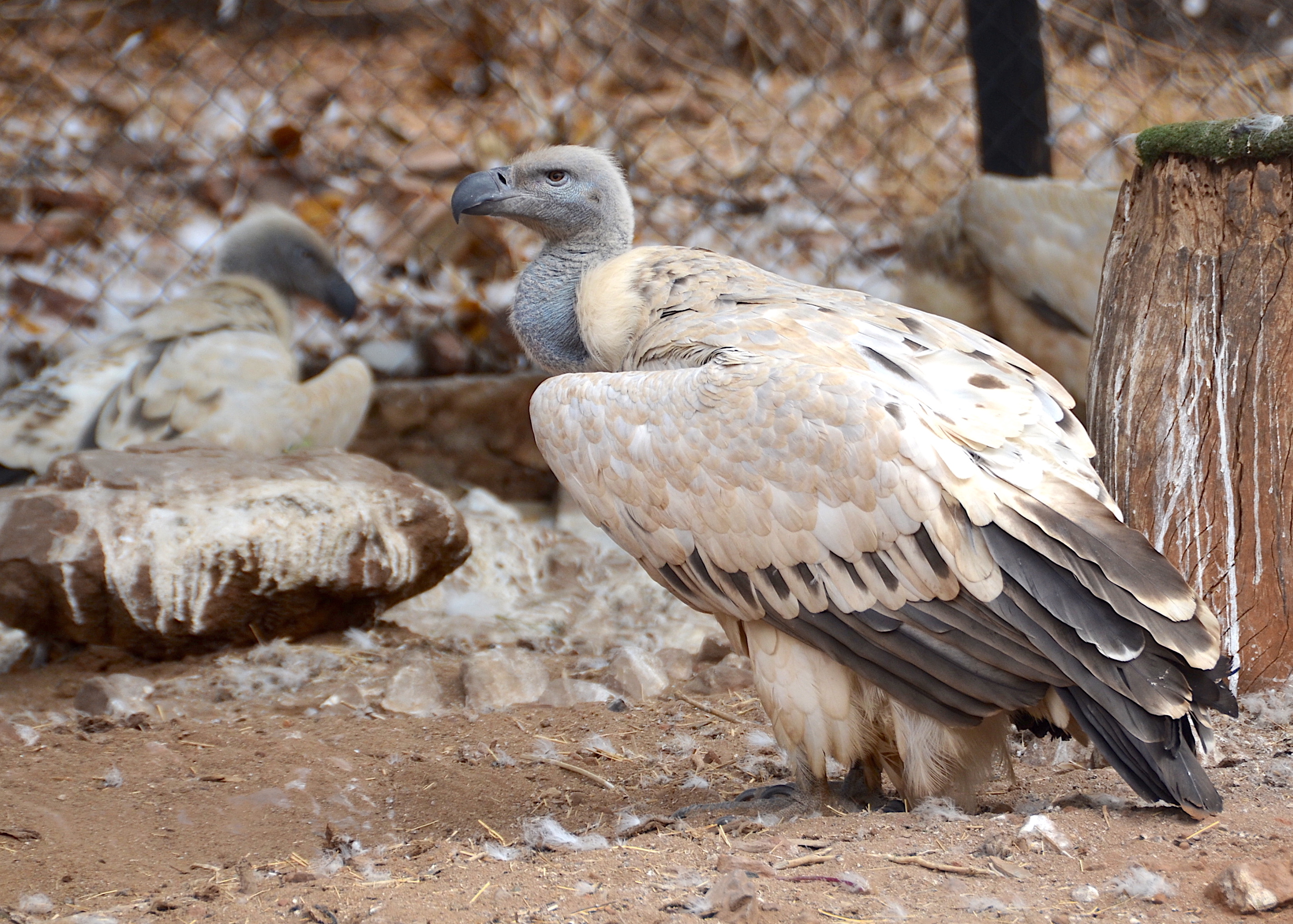
Cape vulture at De Wildt Cheetah and Wildlife Centre

Subsequent to its cheetah breeding programme, the centre also established successful breeding programmes for several other rare and endangered species, including:

- Wild dog
- Brown hyena
- Suni
- Duiker
- Cape vulture
- Riverine rabbit

== Notable achievements ==
The centre first achieved international recognition for bringing the cheetah back from the brink of extinction - it was largely due to the centre that the cheetah was removed from the endangered species list of the South African Red Data Book for Terrestrial Mammals in 1986. Its success can be seen from the fact that, since its inception, over 600 cheetah cubs have been born at the centre, which is a dramatic increase from the period when the total cheetah population of South Africa was estimated at only 700. In 2009, it was estimated that 800 cheetah cubs have been bred so far.

In addition to its cheetah breeding success, the centre has also had other notable successes:

- The first breeder of the rare king cheetah. As a result, it was proved that the king cheetah was not a separate species, but merely a striped variation of the standard spotted cheetah.
- The breeding and release of captive-born African wild dog packs (southern Africa's most endangered carnivore) into their natural habitat.
- A breeding nucleus of the highly endangered riverine rabbit has been donated to the Karoo National Park, the natural habitat of the species.
- A breeding nucleus of the Suni antelope was donated to the Kruger National Park as a resulting of the centre's highly successful Suni breeding programme.

Between 1975 and 2005, 242 litters were born with a total of 785 cubs. In a study done by Bertschinger, H. J., Meltzer, D. J. A., & Van Dyk, A. (2008), the survival rate of cubs was examined. "Mean cub survival from 1 to 12 months and greater than 12 months of age was 71.3 and 66.2%, respectively." This study shows that cheetahs can be bred successfully and that their endangerment can be decreased through these breeding programs.
