= Limpopo National Park =

National park in Mozambique

Coordinates: 23°52′S 32°08′E

Sketch map of Great Limpopo Transfrontier Park

The Mozambican government established the Limpopo National Park (Portuguese: Parque Nacional do Limpopo) in 2002 when it changed the status of Coutada 16 Wildlife Utilisation Area in Gaza Province from a hunting concession to a protected area. The LNP (Portuguese: PNL) forms part of the Great Limpopo Transfrontier Park with the Kruger National Park in South Africa and the Gonarezhou National Park in Zimbabwe.

== Geography ==
Administratively, the park is split between Chicualacuala District (6,400 square kilometres (2,500 mi^{2})), Massingir District (2,100 square kilometres (810 mi^{2})), and Mabalane District (1,500 square kilometres (580 mi^{2})). The park is part of the Great Limpopo Transfrontier Park, a 35,000 km^{2} peace park that links this park, Kruger National Park in South Africa, Gonarezhou National Park, Manjinji Pan Sanctuary and Malipati Safari Area in Zimbabwe, as well as the area between Kruger and Gonarezhou, the Sengwe communal land in Zimbabwe and the Makuleke region in South Africa.

== Wildlife ==
This park is home to mammalian species including elephant, lion, Cape wild dog, leopard, rhinoceros, blue wildebeest, spotted hyena, Cape buffalo, mongoose, kudu, giraffe, zebra, oribi, and hippopotamus.

== History ==
With the help of R42 million donated by Germany the new park is being developed with fencing and anti-poaching units. The park is divided up into three separate zones of use: a tourist zone, a wilderness zone, and a resource utilization zone (hunting). In the south is the Massingir Dam and the town of Massingir in Massingir District, which is the administrative headquarters of the new park, while on the northern border is the Limpopo River.

In 2001 the translocation of a large number of animals from the Kruger National Park to the Limpopo National Park got underway. In 2003 the Mozambican government targeted seven villages located in the Shingwedzi River Watershed, internal to the LNP, for resettlement. As of 2026 some of the villages have been resettled, and others have not. Work on the Giriyondo Border Post between South Africa and Mozambique began in March 2004.

- Park headquarters and staff housing were built;
- The first tourism facilities were opened in September 2005 and include the Machampane tented camp, Machampane wilderness trail, Shingwedzi 4×4 eco-trail, Aguia Pesqueira campsite, Massingir hiking trail and Campismo Albufeira
- Phase two of tourism development in the park began in the early part of 2008. This entails developing concessions in the Boala and Madonse areas as well as a further concession at Massingir;

== See also ==
- Protected areas of Mozambique
