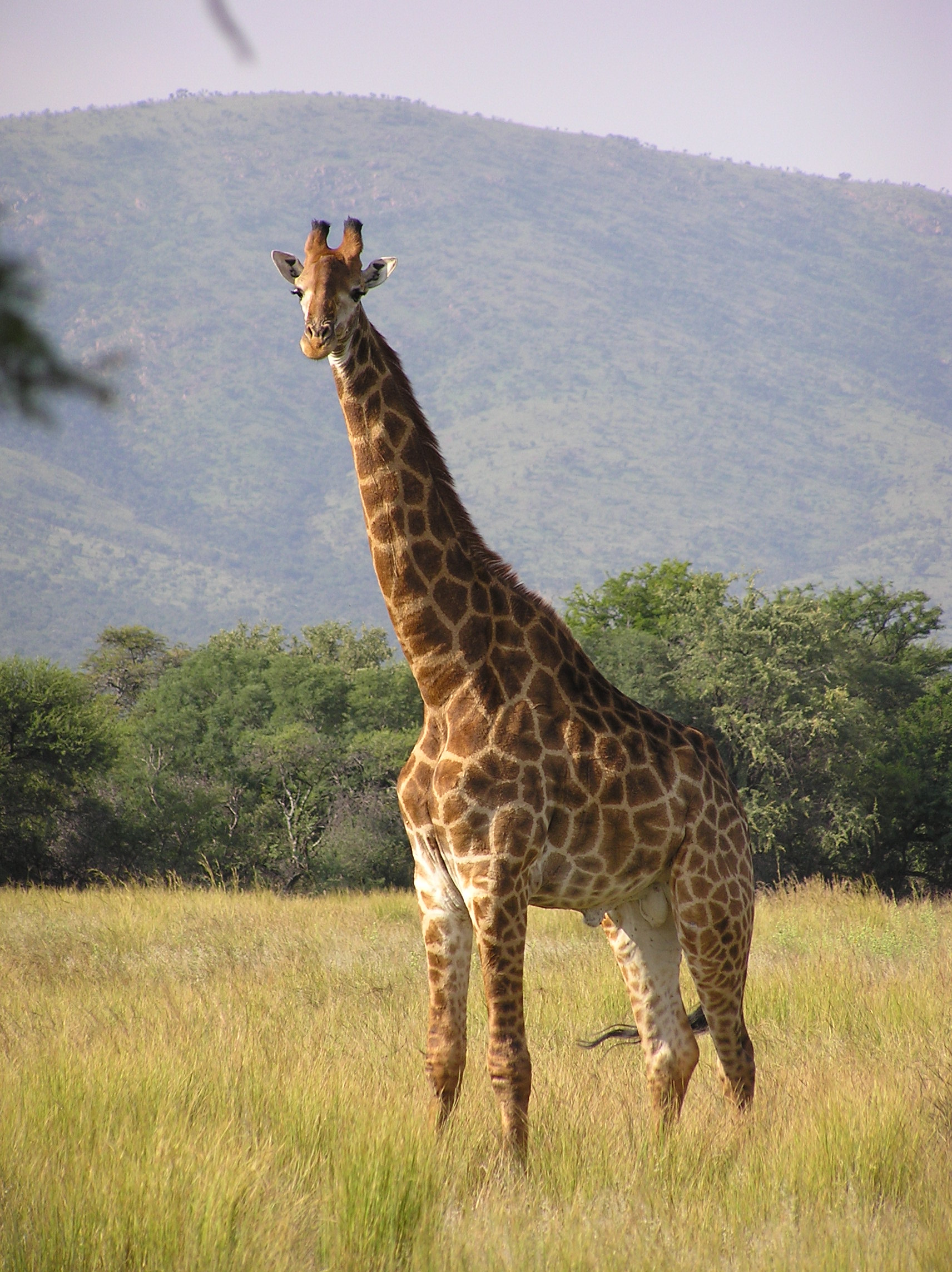
- Male in South Africa

Conservation status
- Not recognized (IUCN 3.1)

Scientific classification
- Kingdom: Animalia
- Phylum: Chordata
- Class: Mammalia
- Order: Artiodactyla
- Family: Giraffidae
- Genus: Giraffa
- Species: G. giraffa
- Subspecies: G. g. giraffa

Trinomial name
- Giraffa giraffa giraffa (von Schreber, 1784)
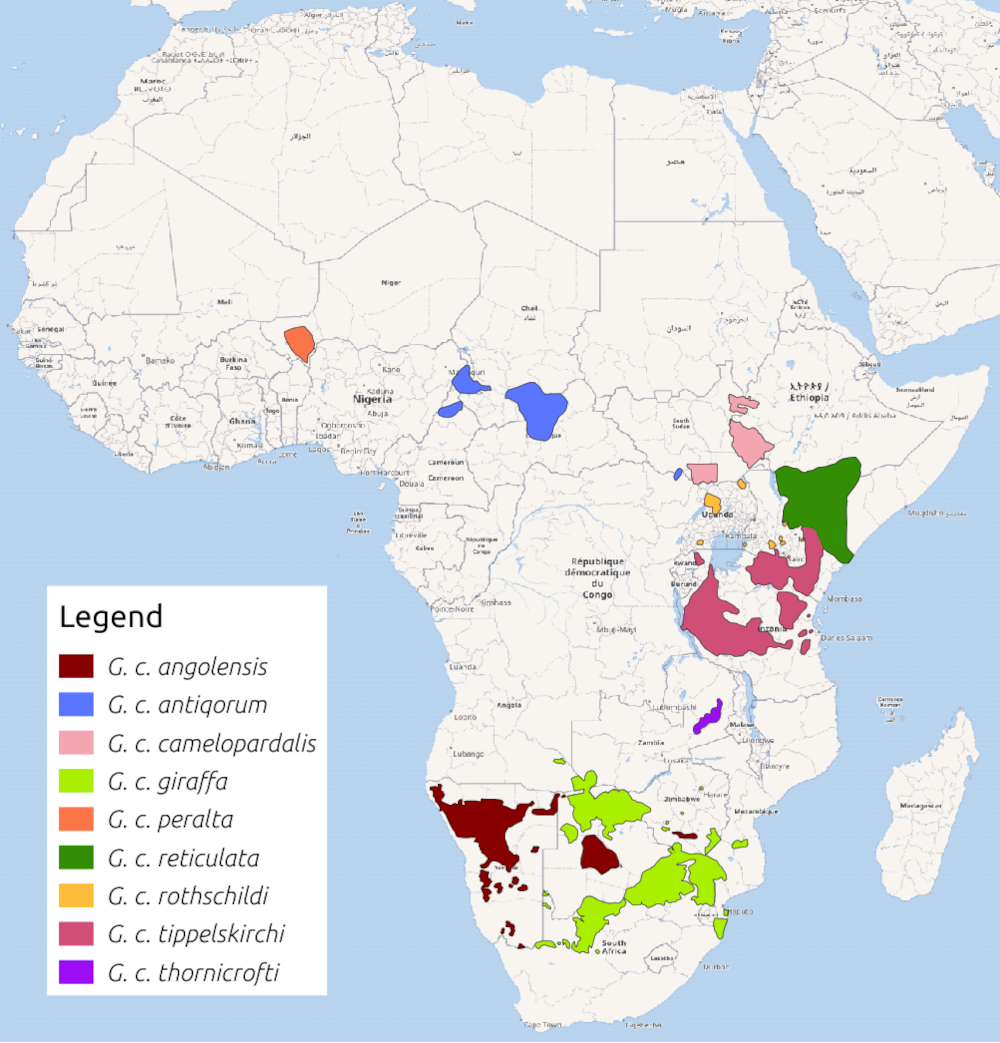
- Range in light green

= South African giraffe =

Subspecies of southern giraffe

The South African giraffe or Cape giraffe (Giraffa giraffa or Giraffa camelopardalis giraffa) is a species or subspecies of giraffe found in South Africa, Namibia, Botswana, Zimbabwe, Eswatini and Mozambique. It has rounded or blotched spots, some with star-like extensions on a light tan background, running down to the hooves.

In 2016, the population was estimated at 31,500 individuals in the wild.

== Taxonomy and evolution ==
The IUCN currently recognizes only one species of giraffe with nine subspecies. The Cape giraffe, along with the whole species, were first known by the binomen Camelopardalis giraffa as described by German naturalist Johann Christian Daniel von Schreber in his publication Die Säugethiere in Abbildungen nach der Natur mit Beschreibungen (The Mammals Illustrated from Nature with Descriptions) during his travel in the Cape of Good Hope in 1784. Dutch naturalist Pieter Boddaert also described it under the binomial name Giraffa giraffa whilst also identifying the nominate specimen of said species under the ternary name Giraffa camelopardalis giraffa in 1785.

Following Schreber's description of the South African giraffe, several specimens were described by other naturalists and zoologists since the end of the 18th century under different scientific names, which are all considered synonyms of Giraffa camelopardalis giraffa today:

- G. giraffa capensis by Lesson, 1842
- G. giraffa australis by Rhoads, 1896
- G. giraffa wardi by Lydekker, 1904
- G. giraffa infumata by Noack, 1808

== Descriptions ==
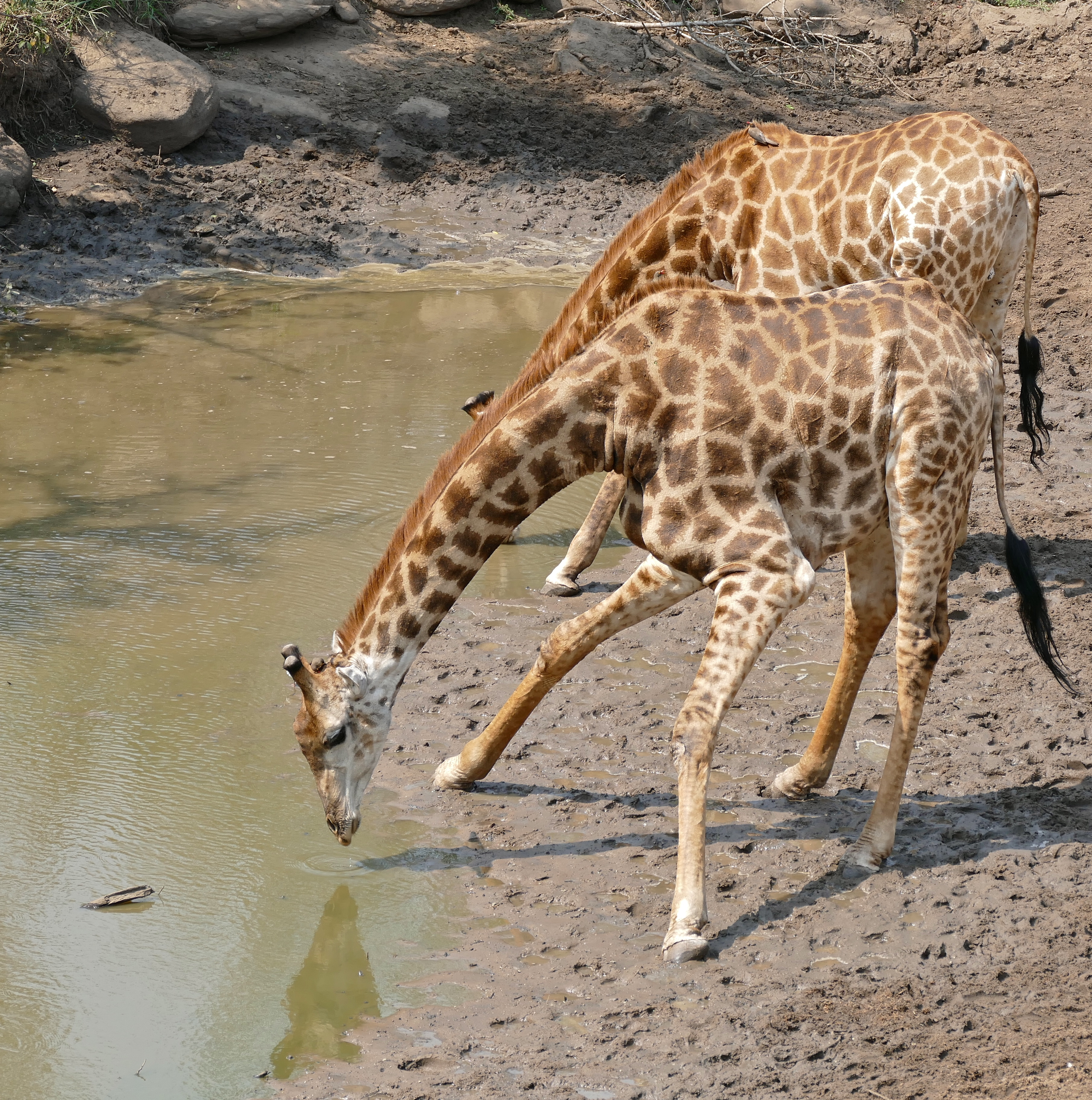
Two bull giraffes drinking. Their mostly convex spots with irregular incisions are typical of the South African subspecies.

The South African giraffe has dark, somewhat rounded patches "with some fine projections" on a tawny background colour. The spots extend down the legs and get smaller. The median lump of males is less developed.

== Distribution and habitat ==
The South African giraffe is found in northern South Africa, southern Botswana, southern Zimbabwe, and south-western Mozambique. After local extinctions in various places, South African giraffes have been reintroduced in many parts of Southern Africa, including in Eswatini. They are common in both in and outside of protected areas. South African giraffes usually live in savannahs and woodlands where food plants are available. Giraffes are herbivorous. They feed on leaves, flowers, fruits and shoots of woody plants such as Acacia.

South African giraffes live in a fission–fusion society system based on factors such as sex, age, season, and kinship. This allows them to adapt to environmental changes.

== Threats ==
As of 2025, the South African giraffe population is estimated at over 53,000 individuals, showing an increase of over 200% over the past three and a half decades. The International Union for the Conservation of Nature, the body that administers the world's official endangered species list, announced in 2016 that it was moving the giraffe from a species of Least Concern to Vulnerable status in its Red List of Threatened Species report. That means the animal faces extinction in the wild in the medium-term future if nothing is done to minimize the threats to its life or habitat.

== In captivity ==
South African giraffes are uncommon in captivity. As of 2010, there are around 45 South African giraffes breeding in zoos. Approximately 12,000 privately owned farms, ranches, and national parks maintain populations of this giraffe.

== Gallery ==
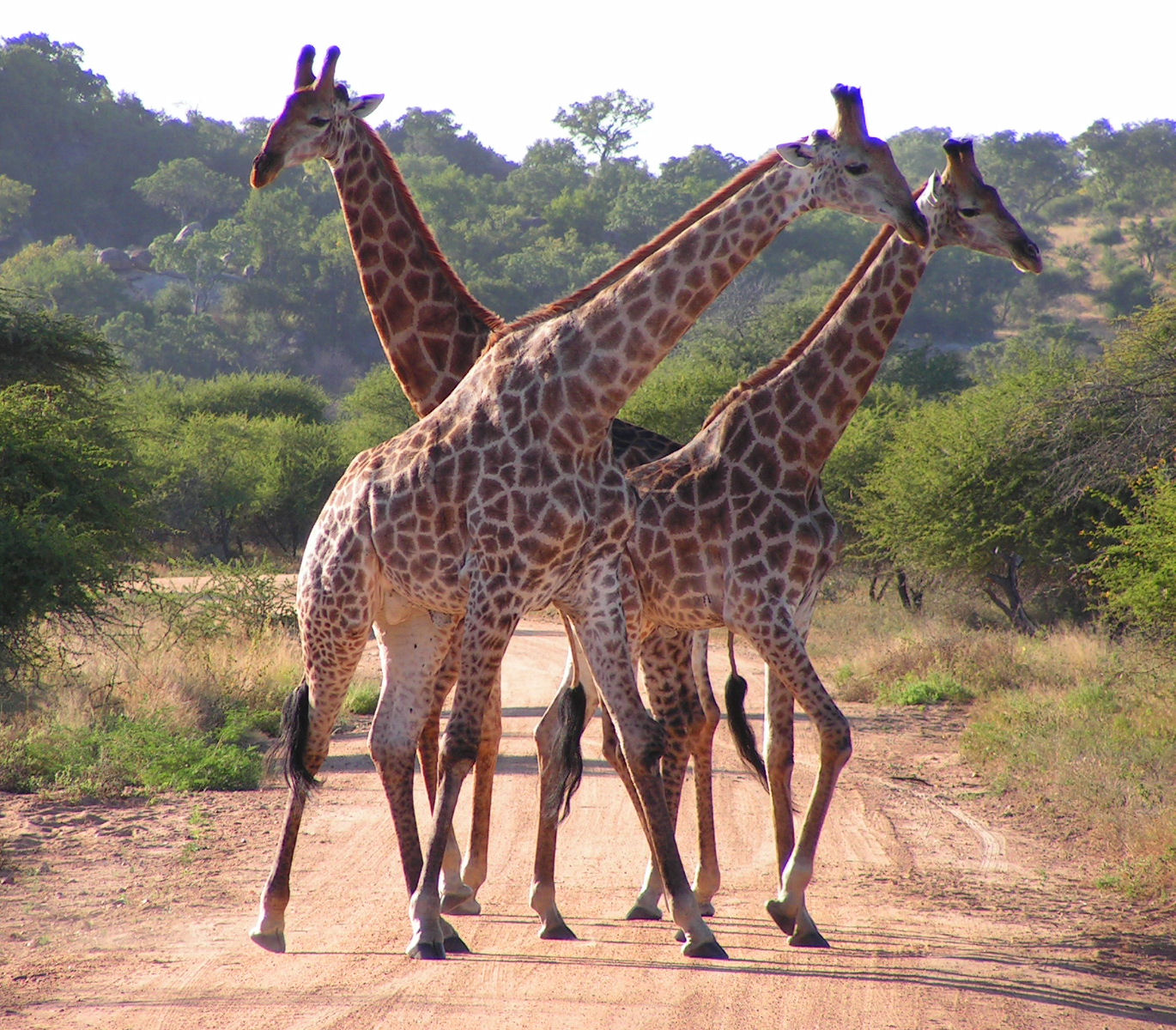
Three bulls, two of them fighting; Kruger National Park, South Africa

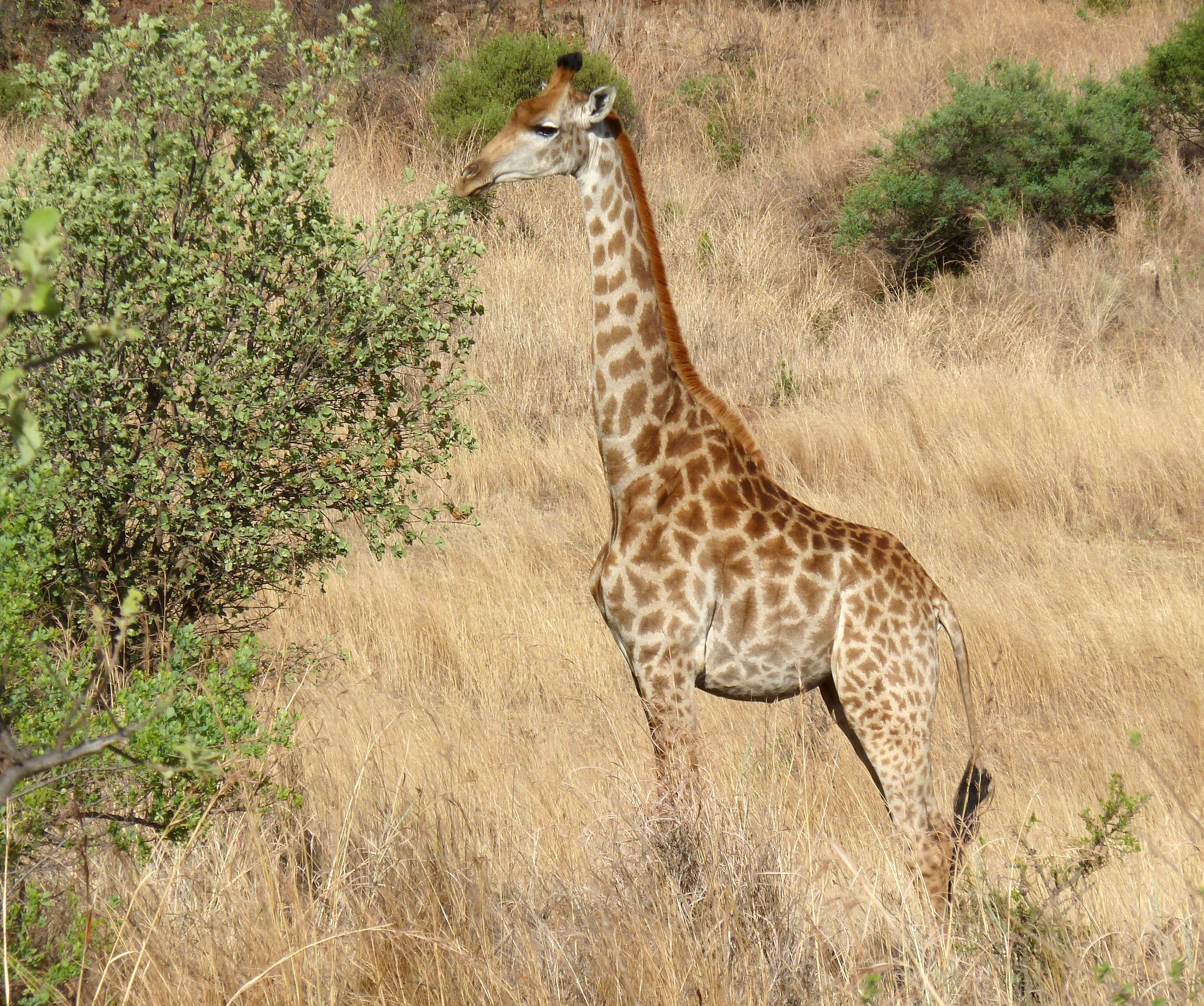
Cow giraffe in Groenkloof Nature Reserve

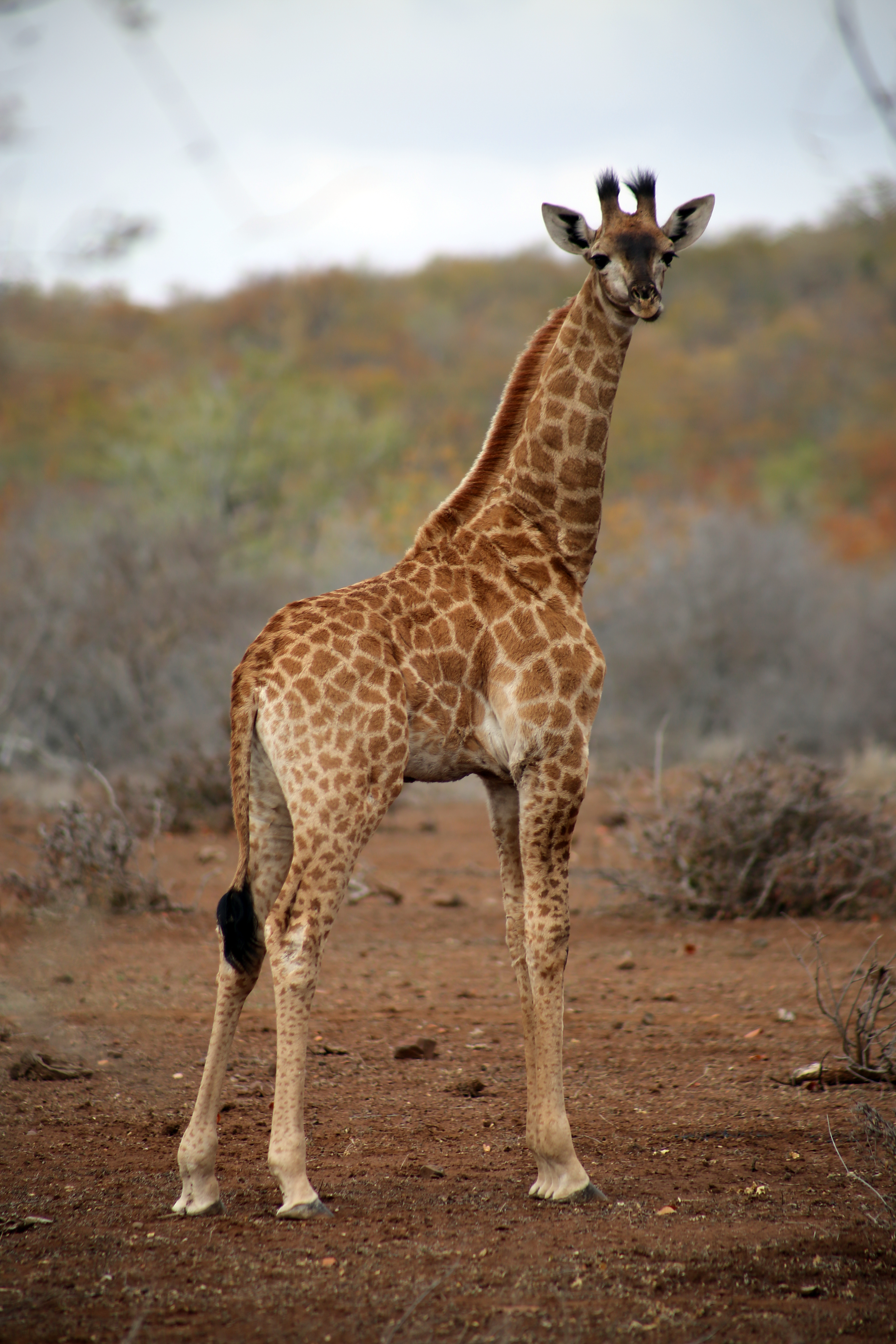
Calf in the Kruger N. P., South Africa

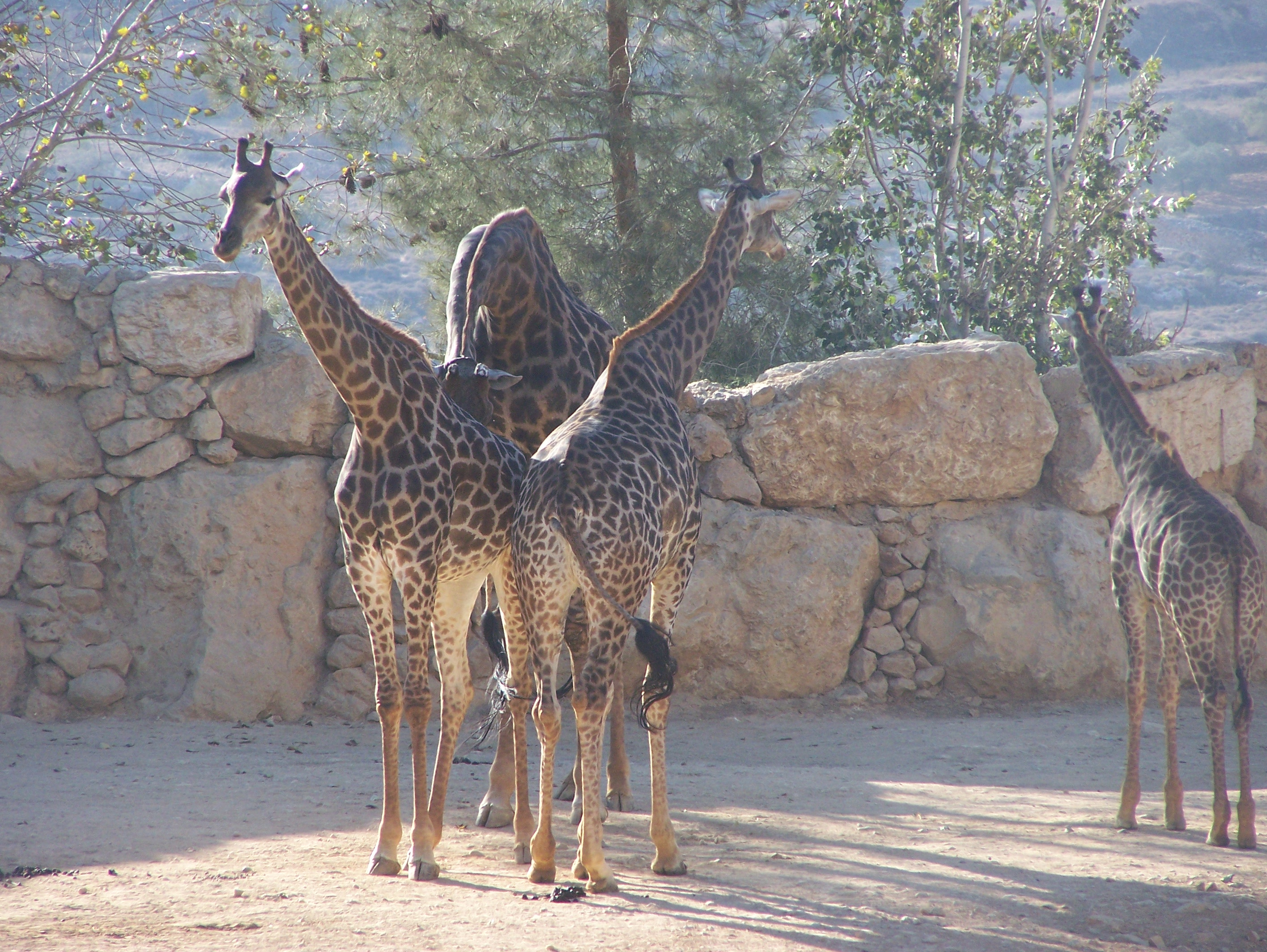
Group of South African giraffe at the Jerusalem Biblical Zoo
