= Wildlife of Zimbabwe =

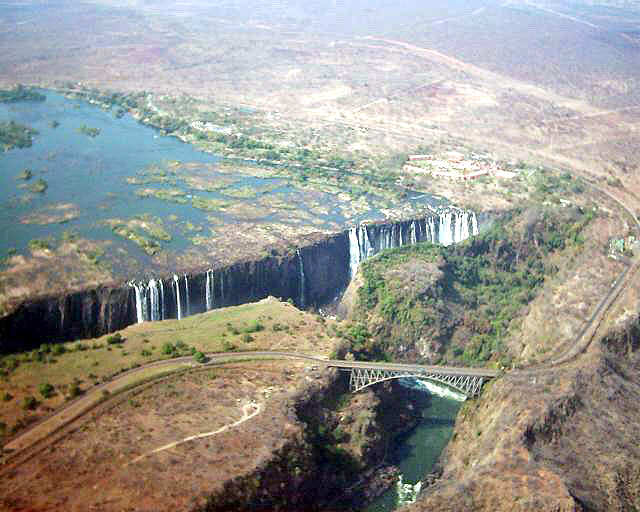
An aerial view of the Victoria Falls

The wildlife of Zimbabwe occurs foremost in remote or rugged terrain, in national parks and private wildlife ranches, in miombo woodlands and thorny acacia or kopje. The prominent wild fauna includes African buffalo, African bush elephant, black rhinoceros, southern giraffe, African leopard, lion, plains zebra, and several antelope species.

The Wildlife Conservation Act of 1960 decreased the loss of wildlife in Zimbabwe. In the 1990s, Zimbabwe became a leader in Africa of wildlife conservation and management. In 2006 the country reported generating US$300 million yearly from its wildlife in protected areas, rural and community run wildlife management areas, and in private game ranches and reserves. The 12-member Parks and Wildlife Board is responsible for this activity and deciding on policy issues under the Ministry of Environment and Natural Resources Management.

The Zimbabwe Parks and Wildlife Management Authority under the board has the onerous task of overseeing the activities related to ten national parks, nine recreational parks, four botanical gardens, four safari areas, and three sanctuaries. These areas are collectively called the Wildlife Estate which covers an area about 47,000 km^{2} (18,000 sq mi), which is equivalent to 12.5% of the total land area of the country.

However, reports by National Geographic News indicate a disturbing trend of decimation of wildlife as a result of a "national economic meltdown" leading to overexploitation of the wildlife resources to meet the finances of the nation.

== Legal codes ==
The Wildlife Conservation Authority initially protected and preserved wildlife in Zimbabwe as "king's game", which was subsequently changed to total state control. However, this created difficulties to the local population who were entirely dependent on the forests for their survival, as they were excluded from using indigenous wildlife resources and also gradually excluded from almost one-half of the country's land base. This seriously affected the sustainable exploitation of the wildlife resources as local people resorted to illegal poaching. However, in the 1960s the economic awareness created a policy shift in managing the wildlife in the country when the Wildlife Conservation Act was introduced. This was followed by the Parks and Wildlife Act of 1975, which enabled the land owners "the right to manage wildlife for their own benefit, thus providing an economic rationale to reinforce the scientific, aesthetic and moral justifications for wildlife conservation". The Parks and Wildlife Act of 1975 has been amended and consolidated in 1982 in which certain animals to be protected have been listed. Hunting of animals has been prohibited except under special permit issued by the minister for scientific or educational purposes or for captive breeding of falcons, live export, and re-stocking, wildlife management or defence of property. Provision also includes taking of indigenous plants, hunting of animals and regulation of fishing. Detailed regulations have been issued to the act.

== Wildlife estate ==
The Wildlife Estate includes eleven national parks: the Chimanimani National Park (including the Eland Sanctuary), Chizarira National Park, the Gonarezhou National Park, the Hwange National Park, the Kazuma Pan National Park, the Mana Pools National Park, the Matusadona National Park, the Matobo National Park, the Nyanga National Park, and Victoria Falls National Park and Zambezi National Parks.

=== Chimanimani National Park ===
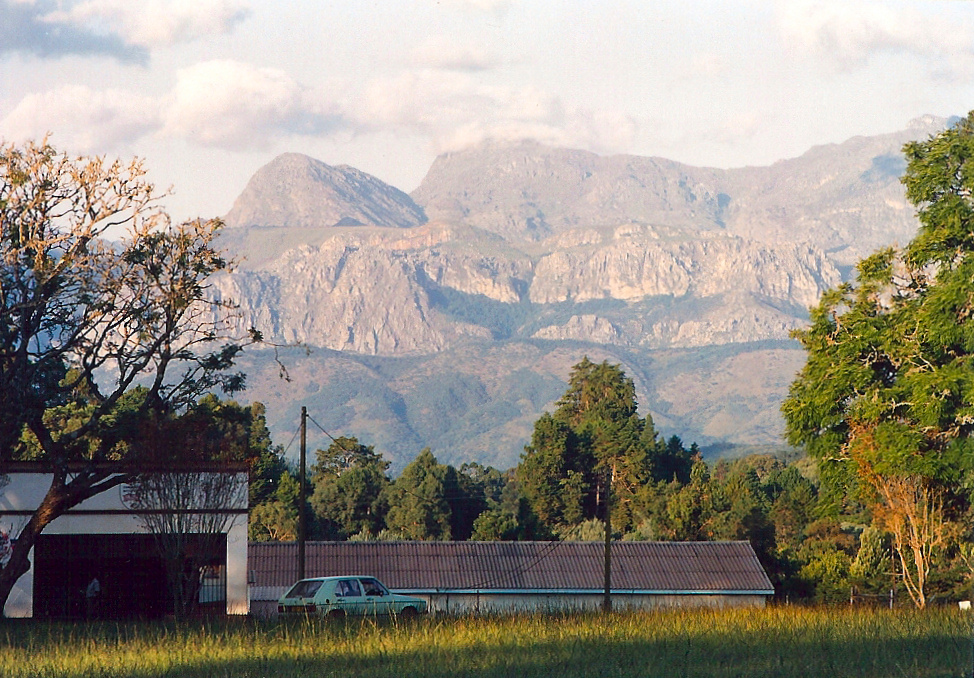
View of the national park area from behind Chimanimani village stores

Chimanimani National Park borders Mozambique in the southernmost area of the Eastern Highlands. It is a mountainous terrain with peak heights of 2,436 metres (7,992 ft) and is the source of many streams and springs enriching the environment of the park with natural falls such as in the Bridal Veil Falls in the Eland Sanctuary. There are also views of the Pork Pie mountain range and the Bridal Veil Falls, which plunges 50 metres (160 ft) down into a base about 10 m wide. The virgin forest cover is of the dense moist evergreen type. It is approachable only by trekking along hill tracks. It is 150 kilometres (93 mi) from the town of Mutare. It has fauna such as eland, sable, bushbuck, blue duiker, klipspringer and also spotted leopard, apart from butterflies, birds, snakes and shy cats.

=== Chizarira National Park ===
Chizarira National Park located in northwestern Zimbabwe covers a virgin forest land of area of 192,000 hectares (470,000 acres); Chizarira means "great barrier". Though it is one of the largest parks, its location is in the remote Zambezi Escarpment and has extensive vistas of its valleys, gorges, plateaus and flood plains. Its large game includes elephant, lion, leopard and buffalo. Its bird species include the African broadbill, Livingstone's flycatcher, western nicator, emerald cuckoo, Angolan pitta and the Taita falcon.

=== Gonarezhou National Park ===
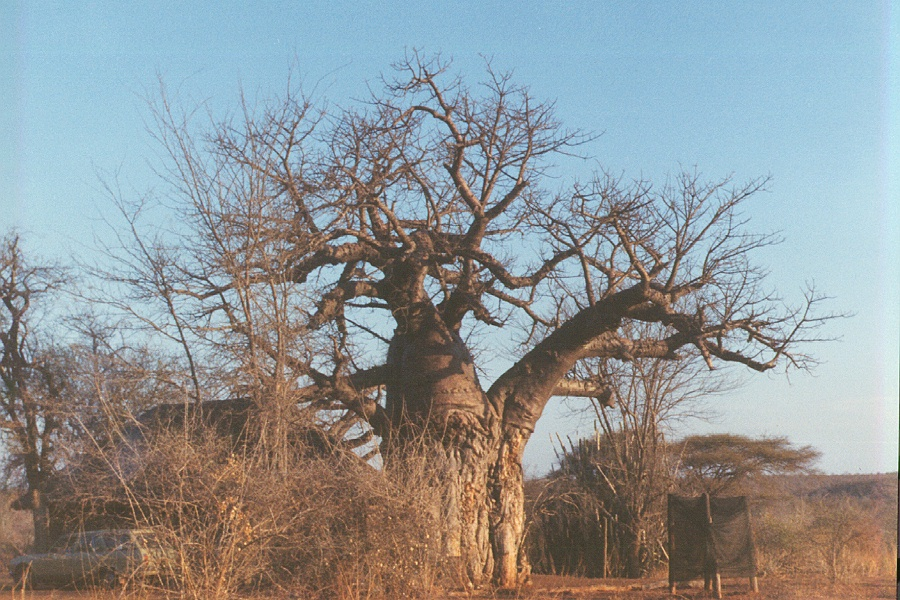
Wildlife camp in the Gonarezhou National Park

Gonarezhou National Park, encompassing an area of about 5,000 km^{2} (1,900 sq mi), in southeastern Zimbabwe is in a remote region along the Mozambique border and is the second largest such park in the country; the first largest park is the Hwange National Park. Gonarezhou in Shona means "elephant's tusk" (which the herbalists used to store their medicines) and it also means "place of many elephants". The park's habitat consists of baobabs, scrub lands and sandstone cliffs in the lowveld region. The park is very large, in rugged terrain, and hence remains unaffected by human interference. The park is within the ambit of the transboundary part of the Great Limpopo Transfrontier Park, a peace park that links Gonarezhou with the Kruger National Park in South Africa and the Limpopo National Park in Mozambique. Animals move freely between the three sanctuaries. The park's rich wildlife consists of 500 species of birds, 147 species of mammals, more than 116 species of reptiles, 34 species of frogs and 49 species of fish. The park's rivers and pools have some unique species of aqua fauna such as the Zambezi shark, freshwater goby, black bream and the turquoise killifish.

=== Hwange National Park ===
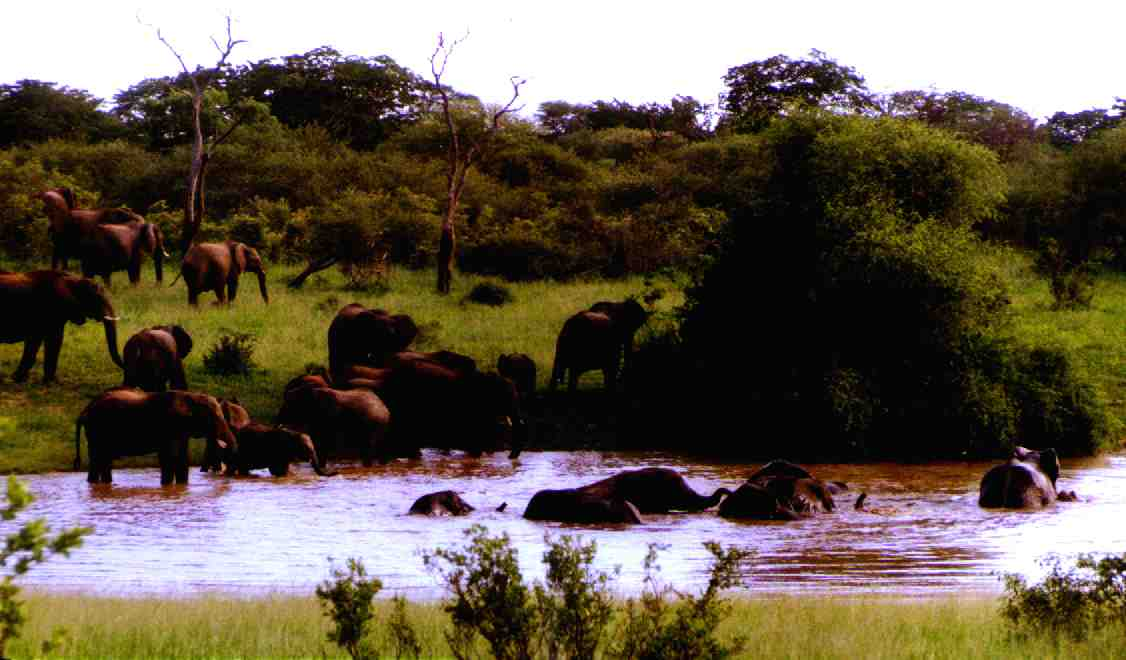
Elephants at Longone Pan, Hwange National Park, Zimbabwe

The Hwange National Park (formerly Wankie National Park) established in 1929 with an area of 14,650 km^{2} (5,660 sq mi) is the largest park and game reserve in Zimbabwe in the south-west corner of the country. The park lies on the main road between Bulawayo and the widely noted Victoria Falls. In the 19th century it was the hunting ground of the Ndebele warrior-king Mzilikazi and it is named after the local Nhanzwa chief. The park is close to the edge of the Kalahari desert, a region with little water and very sparse, xerophile vegetation. While the park abounds in elephant population (one of the largest in the world), it also hosts 100 mammal species, including 19 large herbivores and 8 large carnivores and 400 bird species; Zimbabwe's specially protected animals are all found here. Gemsbok, brown hyena and African wild dogs occur in fairly large numbers (the population of African wild dogs is stated to be of one of the largest surviving groups in Africa now). The very large elephant population has been a matter of concern since, during drought years, they are a burden on the ecological balance of the region. Elephant culling has been done to restrict the population of elephants to 13,000 (less than 1 per km^{2}); against the recommended population of 35,000 – 40,000 animals (0.6 per km^{2}) for the country as a whole. Apart from culling the other suggested option to keep the elephant population under check is sterilization. Conservationists covering this area have also expressed concern at the large "deforestation, poaching and unsustainable resource exploitation" that is occurring in this national park attributed to political and economic instability.

=== Kazuma Pan National Park ===
Kazuma Pan National Park covers 31,300 hectares (77,000 acres) and is located in the northwest corner of Zimbabwe, between Kazungula and Hwange national parks, and south-west of Victoria Falls. Basically, it was developed as a safe haven for the animals during the hunting season, as it formed an extension of the Matetsi Safari Area. It has a series of depressions, which enriches the ground water which is then pumped during the dry season. It has the largest concentration of about 2,000 buffaloes and also elephants and rhinos. Other species of wildlife seen here are: lion, leopard, giraffe, zebra, gemsbok, roan antelope, sable, tsessebe, eland and reedbuck. The oribi, a small antelope, an endemic species, is rarely sighted in the depressions where a large variety of water birds such as storks, crowned cranes, stilts, cormorants, ducks and kingfishers are also seen making it an attractive bird-watching site.

=== Mana Pools National Park ===
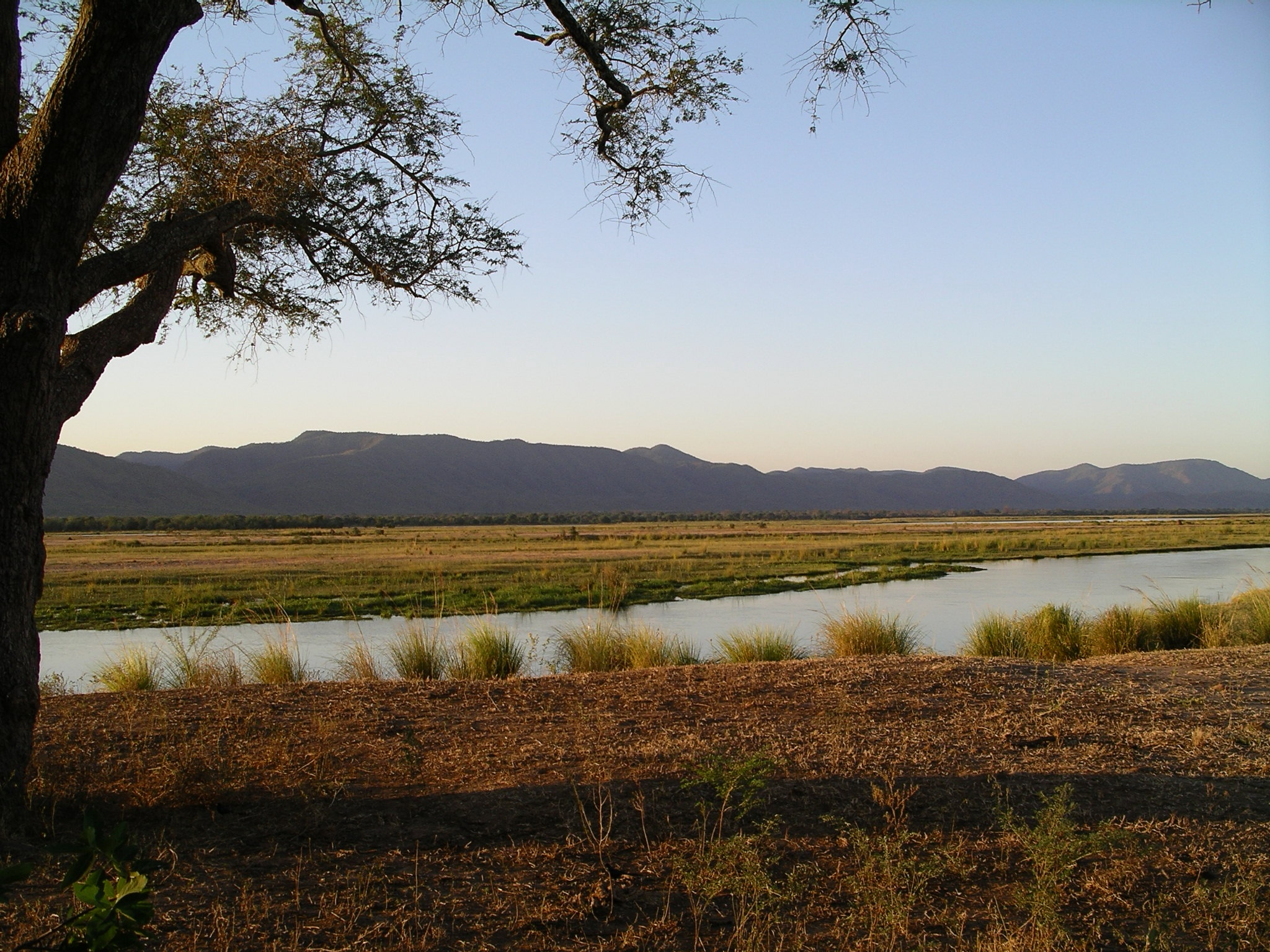
Zambezi River in the Mana Pools National Park

The Mana Pools National Park, a UNESCO Natural World Heritage Site, extending over an area of 2,196 km^{2} (848 sq mi) (as part of the 10,500 km^{2} (4,100 sq mi) Parks and Wildlife Estate that stretches the Kariba Dam in the west to the Mozambique border in the east) is in the region of the lower Zambezi River in Zimbabwe where the flood plain turns into a broad expanse of lakes after each rainy season. As the lakes gradually dry up and recede, the region attracts many large animals in search of water, making it one of Africa's most renowned game-viewing regions. In Shona language, Mana means "four" referring to the four large permanent pools formed by the meandering ox-bow lakes of the middle Zambezi River. Dande Safari Area (532 km^{2} (205 sq mi)) established in 1968, and the Urungwe Safari Area (2,870 km^{2} (1,110 sq mi)) established in 1976 are contiguous to this park. The park's habitat consists of islands, sandbanks and pools, flanked by forests of mahogany, wild figs, ebonies and baobabs. Alluvial deposits along the Zambezi have winterthorn with more diverse woodlands with species of Kigelia africana and Trichelia emetica on the top alluvial layers. The park has the country's biggest concentration of hippopotamuses and crocodiles as well as large dry season mammal populations of elephant and Cape buffalo. Spotted hyena, honey badger, warthog, bushpig, plains zebra and many species of antelope are found here. Bird life consists of 380 species which includes Nyasa lovebird, western nicator, rock pratincole, banded snake-eagle and Livingstone's flycatcher.

=== Matusadona National Park ===
Matusadona National Park, a game reserve in 1963, was declared a national park in 1975 covering an area of 1,400 km^{2} (540 sq mi). It is bounded on the south by the Omay communal, on the north by Lake Kariba, on the east by the Sanyati River and its gorge, and on the west by the Ume River. It has three ecological zones namely, the lake and shoreline grassland forming the first zone, the Zambezi Valley floor made up of a mass of thick jesse and mopane woodland (with sparse grass cover) as the second zone and; the Escarpment area of Julbernadia and Brachystegia woodlands constituting the third zone.

Black rhino, elephants and buffalo inhabit the park. Other species include night ape, honey badger, civet, small spotted genet, slender mongoose, banded mongoose, spotted hyena, serval, lion, leopard, yellow-spotted rock hyrax, black rhinoceros, zebra, warthog, common duiker, grysbok, klipspringer, waterbuck, bushbuck, scrub hare, porcupine, vervet monkey, chacma baboon, side-striped jackal, hippopotamus, roan antelope, kudu and bush squirrel, African clawless otter, white-tailed mongoose, reedbuck, sable antelope, eland, civet, rusty spotted genet, caracal and bush pig; sighted on rarely are Cape wild dog, cheetah, roan and pangolin.

=== Matobo National Park ===
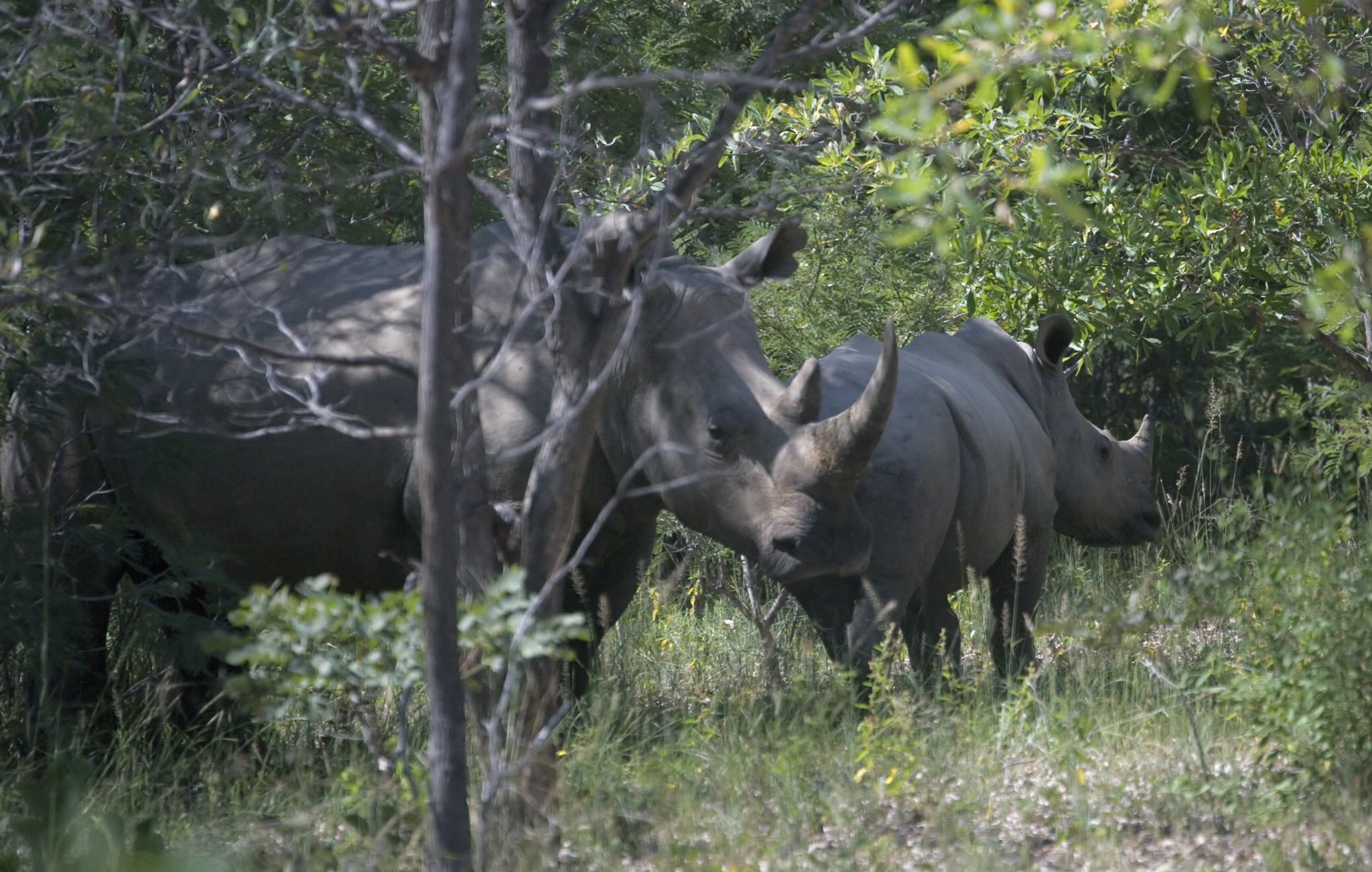
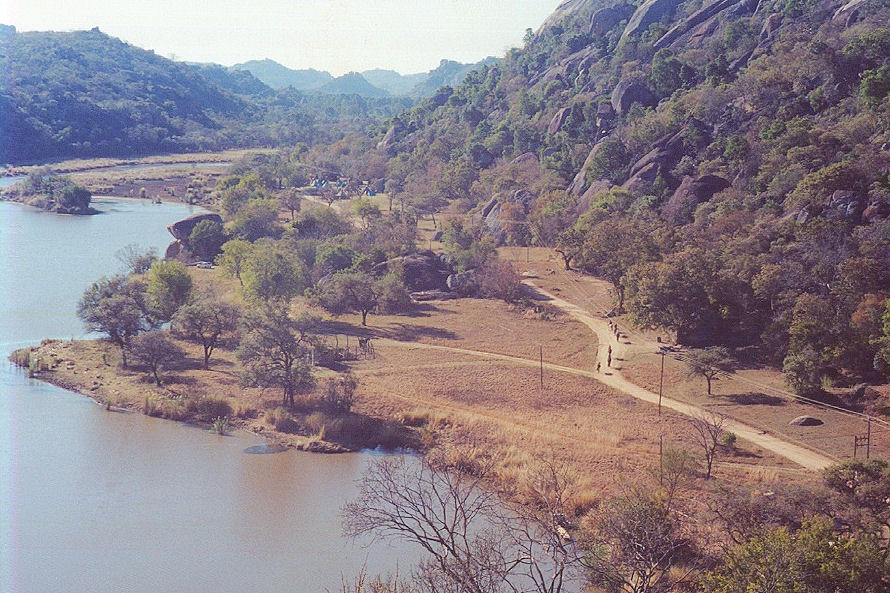
Left: white rhino mother and juvenile in Matopos National Park. Right: A camp site for safaris within the park

The Matobo National Park is part of the UNESCO Matubo Hills, became a national park covering an area of 44,500 hectares (110,000 acres) which was established in 1953. It has an exclusive "Intensive Protection Zone" to protect the large population of black and white rhinoceros. The name Matobo means "bald heads" and was selected by the Matabeleland king Mzilikazi whose grave lies in the Matobo Hills close to the park.

Matobo Hills includes a range of domes, spires and balancing rock formations created erosion and weathering within a granite plateau. It has diverse species of vegetation, including examples of mopane, Acacia, Brachystegia, Ficus, Azanza, Ziziphus, Strychnos and Terminalia. Along with rhinoceros, the park supports also a large number of animal species, including zebra, wildebeest, giraffe, kudu, eland, sable antelope, klipspringer, leopard, hyena, cheetah, hippo, warthog, rock dassies, waterbuck, African wildcat, springhare, common duiker, crocodiles, baboons and monkeys. The park is also rich in bird life, including black eagle, African fish eagle, martial eagle, secretarybird, pied crow, Egyptian goose, francolin, and weavers. Fish species in the park include bass, bottle fish, bream, catfish and Melanochromis robustus. The park has a number of dams such as the Maleme Dam, the Mthselele Dam, the Toghwana Dam, the Mesilume Dam, which are all communal camp sites.

=== Nyanga National Park ===
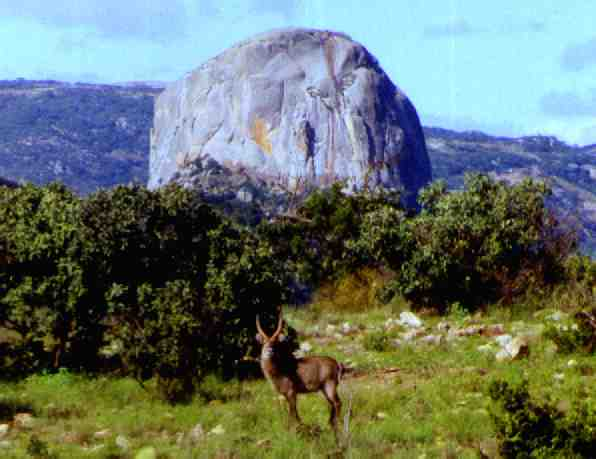
Male waterbuck in the Udu area of the park

The Nyanga National Park in the Eastern Highlands of Zimbabwe located at about 268 kilometres (167 mi) from Harare (connected by a black topped road) is made up of rolling green hills terrain with perennial rivers which spread through the 47,000 hectares (120,000 acres) park. The park lies between 1,800 metres (5,900 ft) and 2,593 metres (8,507 ft) elevation and has salubrious mountain climate. It is rich in flora and fauna. The faunal species seen in the park are the waterbuck, wildebeest, kudu, zebra, impala, sables and eland. The rivers in the park have fresh water fish such as the Nyanga trout. The visitor attractions in the park are: The Mount Nyangani (2593 m), the Nyangombe Falls, Mutarazi Falls, Pungwe Gorge & Falls, Nyamuziwa Falls, Nyangwe & Chawomera Forts and the Trout Hatchery near Purdon Dam.

=== Victoria Falls and Zambezi National Park ===
The Victoria Falls and Zambezi National Parks, a UNESCO Natural World Heritage Site, are located on the western edge of Zimbabwe; the two together cover an area of 56,000 hectares (140,000 acres) bounded by the Zambezi River, which borders with Zambia. The Falls and the Pa National Park are on the southern bank of the Zambezi River. The Victoria Falls, one of seven natural wonders of the world, is 1.7 kilometres (1.1 mi) wide, cascades 70–108 metres (230–354 ft) into the gorge and is formed by five different "falls", out of which four are in Zimbabwe. The catchment area of the falls is made up of rainforests with rich and unique species of flora and fauna. The flora consists of species of fig, mahogany and date palm. An attraction is the large baobab tree near the Falls which is 16 m in diameter and 20 metres (66 ft) tall. The notable wildlife in the parks consists of elephants, lions, buffalos, leopards and white rhinoceros apart from herds of sable antelope, eland, zebra, giraffe, kudu, waterbuck and impala. The Zambezi River is rich in fish fauna such as bream and fighting tigerfish.

== Vegetation ==
The vegetation or flora type is generally uniform in Zimbabwe. Bushveld or thorny acacia savanna and miombo or dry open woodland dominate the central and western plateau. In the south and southeast, which are dry lowlands, thorny scrub and baobabs are extensive. Cactus-like euphorbias (similar to pipe organs), 30 species of aloes, wildflowers, profusion of jacarandas, and succulent tropical flowers and palms are some of the plant species commonly seen in the country.

The dominant woody species noted in the Northwest Matebeleland, the Sebungwe region, in the Zambezi River Valley and in Gonarezhou National Park are: C. mopane, B. plurijuga, Guibourtia coleosperma, Pterocarpus angolensis and Acacia species, Julbernadia globiflora, Brachystegia boehmii, Erythrophleum africanum, P. angolensis, B. africana, Kirkia acuminata, Adansonia digitata, Screrocarya birrea, B. massaiensis, D. condylocarpon, T. sericea and Combretum species. Brachystegia allenii, J. globiflora, C. apiculatum, Terminali stuhlmannii, and Acacia tortlis, Grewia spp., Terminalia prunioides, S. birrea, Commiphora spp., A. nigrescence, A. digitata, and T. sericea.

Flora

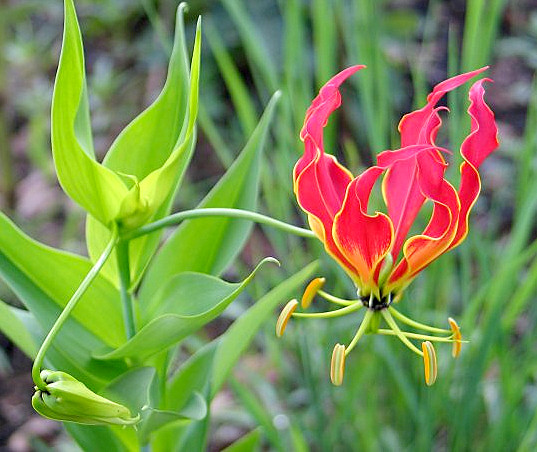
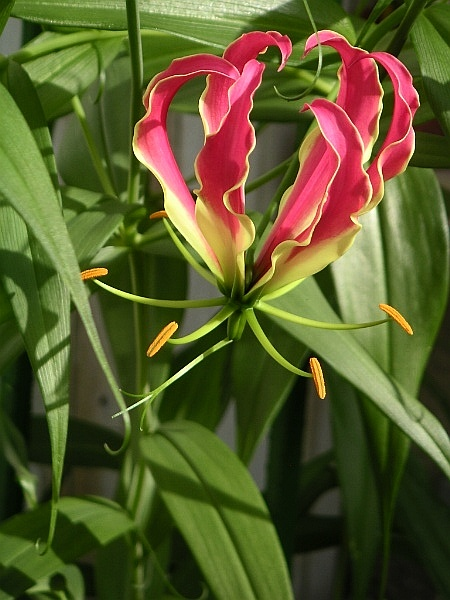
Left: flame lily, national flower of Zimbabwe. Right: flame lily or Gloriosa rothschildiana, the national flower of Zimbabwe

Some of the floral; species of Zimbabwe are: Conyza sumatrensis, Hesperantha coccinea (river lily) and Strychnos spinosa. Flame lily (genus Gloriosa) grows profusely throughout the country and hence is designated as the national flower of Zimbabwe. It is a climbing lily which reaches heights of 8 ft and has bright red and yellow petals.

== Fauna ==
=== Mammals ===
There are 199 mammal species in Zimbabwe. The black rhino is listed as critically endangered. The African wild dog is endangered. Among others, vulnerable species include Arends's golden mole, black-footed cat, and ground pangolin.

=== Amphibians and reptiles ===
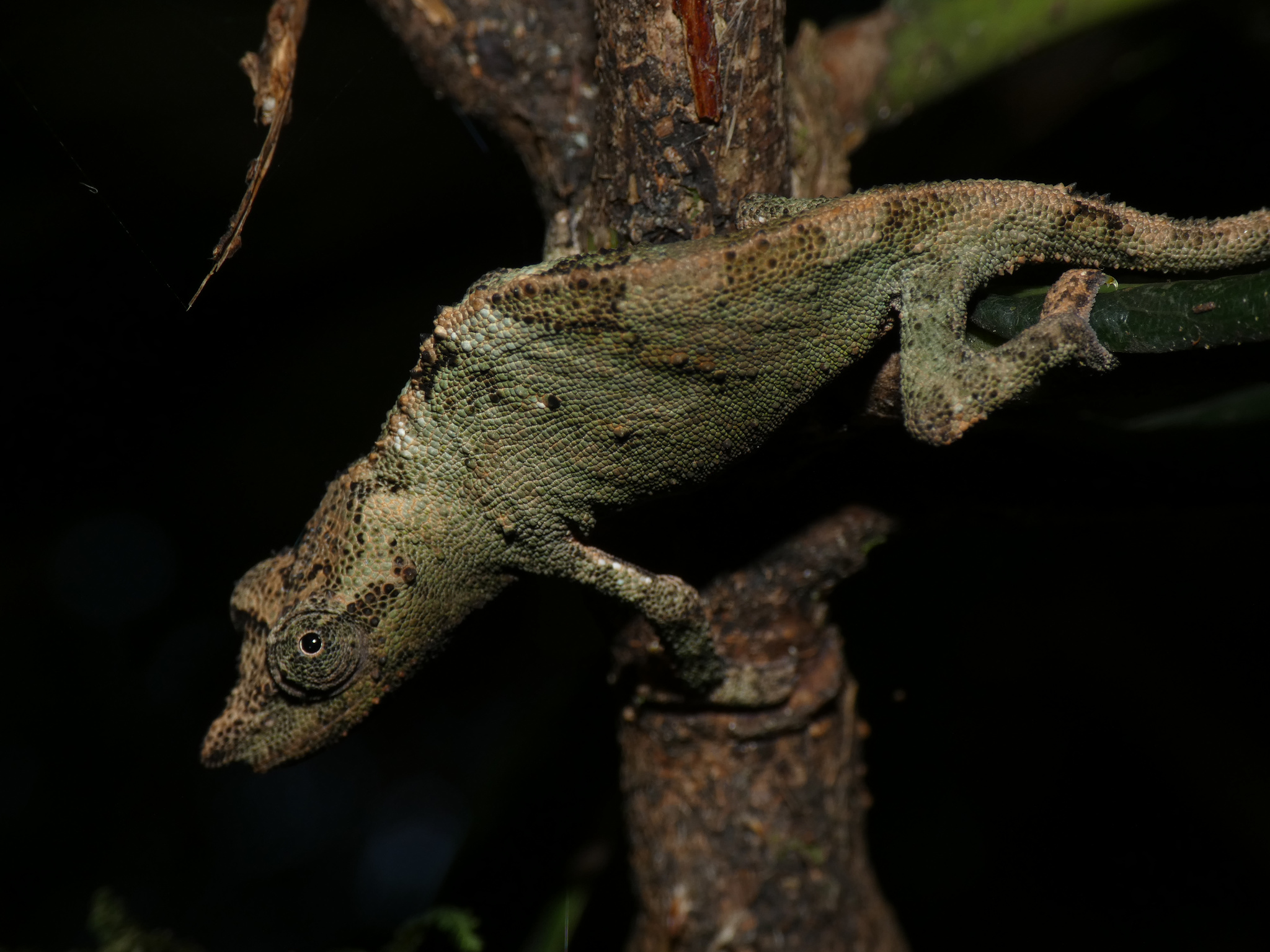
Marshall's pygmy chameleon, found in the forests of Zimbabwe

Of the many amphibians and reptiles in Zimbabwe, a few deserve mention due to their status on the IUCN Red List:

==== Critically endangered ====
- Cave squeaker

==== Endangered ====
- Forest rain frog
- Nyanga river frog
- Zambezi flapshell turtle
- Zygaspis ferox

==== Vulnerable ====
- Chimanimani stream frog
- Gaboon viper
- Inyanga toad
- Marshall's pygmy chameleon
- Nyanga long reed frog

=== Fish ===
The kurper bream is considered critically endangered. Three other species of the Oreochromis genus found in Zimbabwe are listed as vulnerable.

Tourist companies tout catching tigerfish and bream in Mana Pools National Park, and vundu and chessa in the Zambezi. The cornish jack is an unusual fish that uses electricity to locate prey. Another interesting fish is the lungfish. These eel-like fish can survive months out of water by burrowing into hardened mud.

=== Birds ===
Zimbabwe Bird, the national emblem of Zimbabwe, likely the bateleur eagle or the African fish eagle

BirdLife International reported 629 species of bird sighted in Zimbabwe as of 2024. Avibase - Bird Checklists of the World reported 708 species as of 2024. Avibase reports five introduced species.

Four birds in Zimbabwe are listed as critically endangered: the hooded vulture, white-backed vulture, white-headed vulture, and white-winged flufftail. Another eight are listed as endangered and eleven as vulnerable.
