= Lion and Tusk =

Logo of the British South Africa Company (BSAC)

- Armiger: British South Africa Company; Rhodesia
- Adopted: 1890 (BSAC); 1970 (Rhodesia)
- Relinquished: 1965 (BSAC); 1980 (Rhodesia)

The Lion and Tusk was the main logo of the British South Africa Company (BSAC) and later as a state symbol of Rhodesia. The logo was used following the Company being set up during the scramble for Africa and was used as they governed Rhodesia. Following the company relinquishing control of Northern and Southern Rhodesia, the symbol fell out of favour with the Rhodesian public. However, following the Rhodesian republic being declared in 1970, the Lion and Tusk symbol was adopted as a state symbol to replace the British Empire's Royal crown until the establishment of Zimbabwe in 1980.

== Background ==
The Lion and Tusk was adopted as a corporate insignia of the British South Africa Company following it receiving a Royal Charter allowing it to fly its own flag. The Lion and Tusk featured in the centre of the flag of the British South Africa Company. The Lion and Tusk was referred to in heraldic terms as "a lion passant guardant Or, supporting with its right forepaw an ivory tusk proper", though it was also irreverently referred to as "the lion with the tooth-pick". A 1902 Admiralty warrant later entitled the BSAC to use the Lion and Tusk on Blue and Red Ensigns.

During the early days of Company rule in Rhodesia, it was used as the badge of the British South Africa Police and the Rhodesia Horse cavalry unit. Following the 1922 Southern Rhodesian government referendum where Southern Rhodesia voted for responsible government independent of the BSAC, the Lion and Tusk fell into disuse in the Rhodesias, especially in Southern Rhodesia where their people wanted new symbols independent of BSAC influence. It continued to be used as the BSAC's corporate logo until 1965 when the company merged with the Charter International.

== Rhodesia ==
Following Rhodesia's Unilateral Declaration of Independence in 1965, their insignia remained the same due to loyalty to Queen Elizabeth II. But the Lion and Tusk started to regain popularity as a separate Rhodesian symbol with it being used on commemorative gold Rhodesian pound coins in 1966 to celebrate the first anniversary of UDI. Following the announcement of a republic in 1970, the Lion and Tusk was selected as the symbol to replace the Royal St Edward's Crown on Rhodesian insignia. The Rhodesian Air Force also replaced their British inspired Royal Air Force style roundels, with the Lion and Tusk being used surrounded by a green and white roundel. This came after discussions for the RhAF symbol considered using either the Zimbabwe bird, flame lily or an elephant before deciding overwhelmingly for the Lion and Tusk.

Following Rhodesia becoming Zimbabwe, the Lion and Tusk symbol fell out of use. The name and logo would be used in Tauranga, New Zealand as the name of a museum dedicated to the Rhodesian Security Forces.

The arms of the British South Africa Company

A Rhodesian Army general's insignia

The Rhodesian Air Force's roundel post-1970
