= Probreviceps rungwensis =

Conservation status
- Endangered (IUCN 3.1)

Scientific classification
- Kingdom: Animalia
- Phylum: Chordata
- Class: Amphibia
- Order: Anura
- Family: Brevicipitidae
- Genus: Probreviceps
- Species: P. rungwensis

Binomial name
- Probreviceps rungwensis Loveridge, 1932

Synonyms
- Probreviceps macrodactylus rungwensis Loveridge, 1932

Species of frog

Probreviceps rungwensis is a species of frog in the family Brevicipitidae. It is endemic to Tanzania and is known from the Mahenge and Udzungwa Mountains as well as the Southern Highlands, including the eponymic Mount Rungwe, its type locality. It was first described as a subspecies of Probreviceps macrodactylus, but is now considered a full species. Furthermore, genetic data suggest that the nominal species includes more than one species.

== Description ==
Adult males can grow to 48 mm (1.9 in) and adult females to 60 mm (2.4 in) in snout–vent length. The body is stout and the legs are short, reflecting its burrowing habits. The snout is pointed and protruding beyond the lower jaw. The tympanum is distinct and large, up to 1.5 times the eye diameter, but partly obscured by the supra-tympanic fold. The dorsum is brown and has no distinct markings. The flanks, arms, and legs are dark brown and bear white-tipped warts.

== Habitat and conservation ==
Probreviceps rungwensis lives in montane and submontane forests at elevations of about 1,050 to 2,200 m (3,440 to 7,220 ft) above sea level. It is a semi-fossorial forest-floor species. The eggs are deposited in burrows in the leaf litter and hatch directly into small froglets.

Probreviceps rungwensis is an uncommon species that is only known from few locations; the overall population appears fragmented. Although it tolerates mild habitat disturbance, it is likely to be suffering from the ongoing forest loss, primarily caused by subsistence small-scale agriculture and pole cutting and logging. However, it occurs in some protected areas that are considered comparatively well-managed.
