= Probreviceps uluguruensis =

Conservation status
- Endangered (IUCN 3.1)

Scientific classification
- Kingdom: Animalia
- Phylum: Chordata
- Class: Amphibia
- Order: Anura
- Family: Brevicipitidae
- Genus: Probreviceps
- Species: P. uluguruensis

Binomial name
- Probreviceps uluguruensis (Loveridge, 1925)

Synonyms
- Breviceps uluguruensis Loveridge, 1925

Species of frog

Probreviceps uluguruensis is a species of frog in the family Brevicipitidae. It is endemic to the Uluguru Mountains, Tanzania. Common names Uluguru big-fingered frog and Uluguru forest frog have been proposed for it.

== Description ==
Males grow to 30 mm (1.2 in) and females to 43 mm (1.7 in) in snout–vent length. The eyes are small and the tympanum is not visible. The dorsum is rough and cream to brown in colour. There is a pair of pale lateral bands that in some females might be deep red. The lower surfaces are purple. The eyes are pale to orange-brown. The male advertisement call is a brief, low-pitched chirp.

== Habitat and conservation ==
Probreviceps uluguruensis occurs in montane grasslands, but also marginally in montane forests, at elevations of 1,800–2,500 m (5,900–8,200 ft) above sea level. It is a semi-fossorial frog that lives on the ground. The eggs are deposited under grass tufts in burrows and have direct development (i.e., there is no free-living larval stage).

This species tolerates marginally disturbed habitats and can locally be relatively common. However, its range is relatively small and its habitat can be adversely affected by human-induced fires and forest loss. It occurs in the Uluguru Nature Reserve, relatively well-protected reserve.
