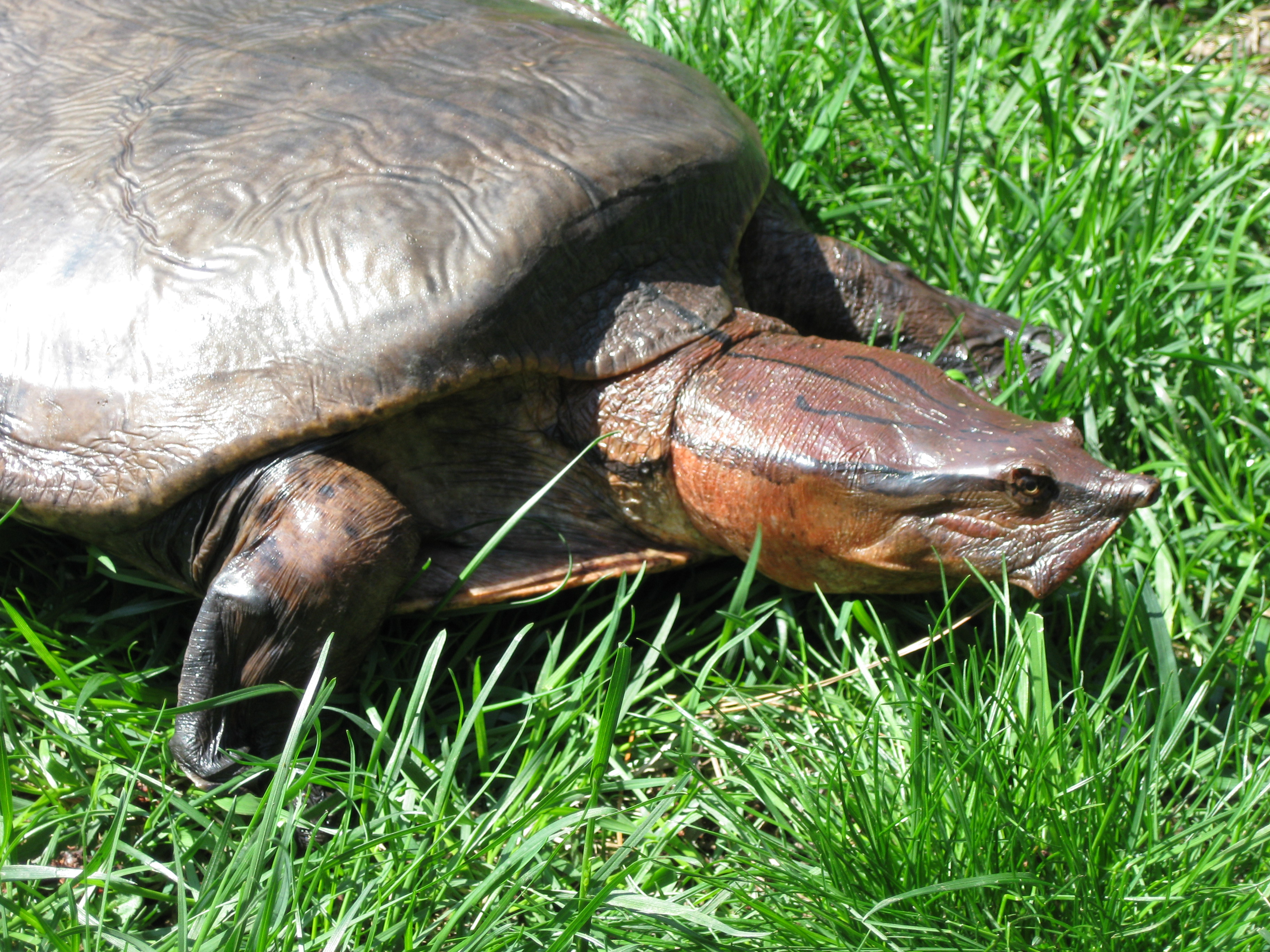
- Aubry's flapshell turtle (C. aubryi)

Scientific classification
- Kingdom: Animalia
- Phylum: Chordata
- Class: Reptilia
- Order: Testudines
- Suborder: Cryptodira
- Family: Trionychidae
- Subfamily: Cyclanorbinae
- Genus: Cycloderma; W. Peters, 1854

Synonyms
- Heptathyra Cope, 1860; Aspidochelys Gray, 1860; Aspidochelis [sic] Marshall, 1873 (ex errore)

= Cycloderma =

Cycloderma Temporal range: Miocene to recent, 23.03–0 Ma

Genus of turtles

Cycloderma is a genus of softshell turtles in the subfamily Cyclanorbinae of the family Trionychidae. The genus is endemic to Africa.

== Species ==
The genus Cycloderma contains the following extant species:

- Aubry's flapshell turtle – Cycloderma aubryi (A.H.A. Duméril, 1856)
- Zambezi flapshell turtle – Cycloderma frenatum W. Peters, 1854

Two extinct fossil species are also known: Cycloderma victoriae Andrews, 1914, from the early Miocene of Kenya; and Cycloderma debroinae Meylan et al., 1990, from the late Miocene to the Pliocene of Kenya.

Nota bene: A binomial authority in parentheses indicates that the species was originally described in a genus other than Cycloderma.

== Bibliography ==
- Rhodin, Anders G.J.; van Dijk, Peter Paul; Iverson, John B.; Shaffer, H. Bradley; Roger, Bour (2011-12-31). "Turtles of the world, 2011 update: Annotated checklist of taxonomy, synonymy, distribution and conservation status" (PDF). Chelonian Research Monographs. 5. Archived from the original (PDF) on 2012-01-31.
- Fritz, Uwe; Havaš, Peter (2007-10-31). "Checklist of Chelonians of the World" (PDF). Archived from the original (PDF) on 2011-05-01.
