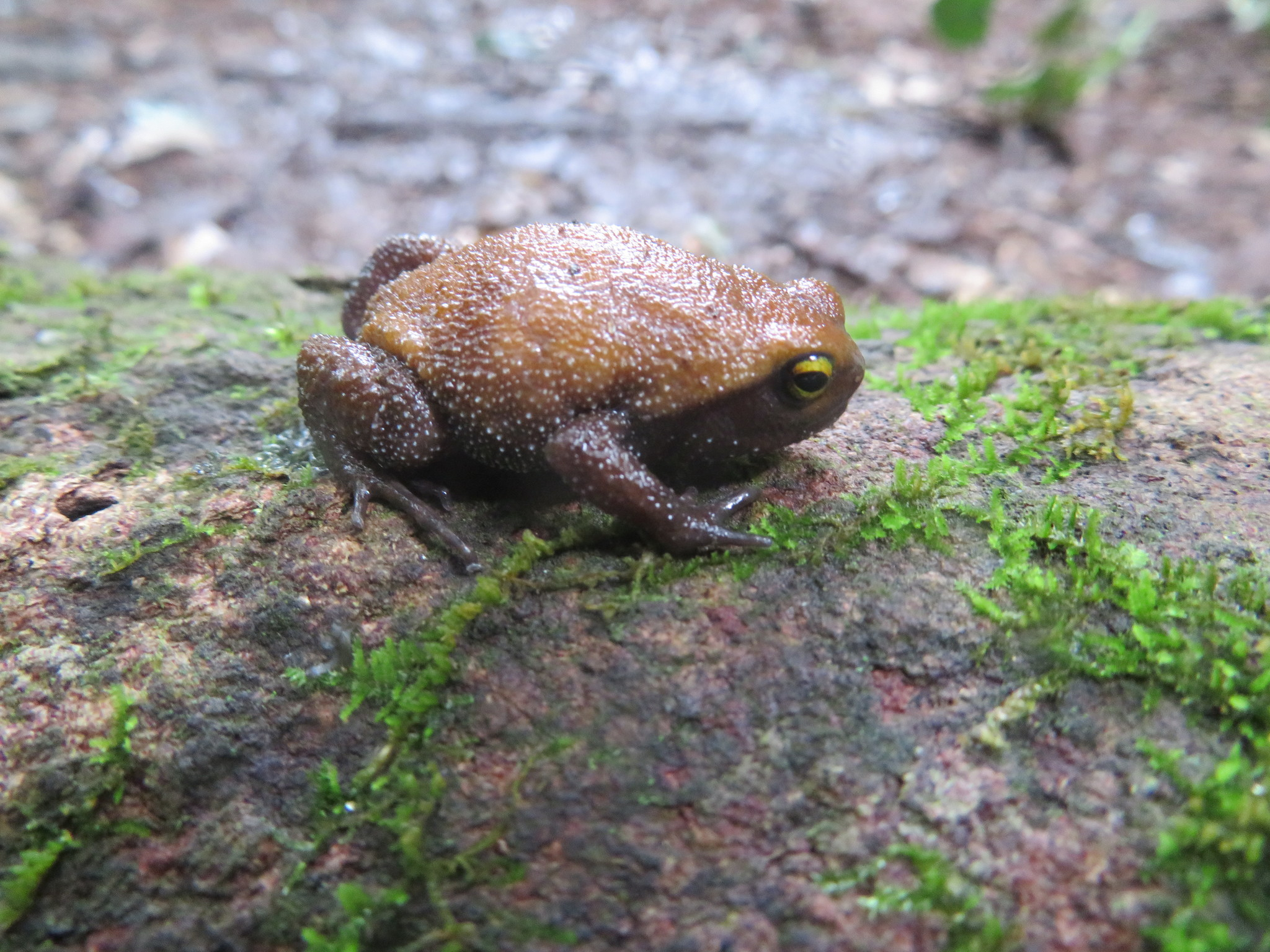
- Probreviceps loveridgei

Scientific classification
- Domain: Eukaryota
- Kingdom: Animalia
- Phylum: Chordata
- Class: Amphibia
- Order: Anura
- Family: Brevicipitidae
- Genus: Probreviceps; Parker, 1931

Type species
- Probreviceps macrodactylus Nieden, 1926

Species
- 6 species (see text)

= Probreviceps =

Genus of amphibians

Probreviceps is a small genus of brevicipitine frogs with only six members. They occur in the montane forests of Tanzania, Zimbabwe, and possibly Mozambique. They are sometimes known as the forest frogs, forest rain frogs, big-fingered frogs, or primitive rain frogs.

== Description ==
Probreviceps are burrowing frogs with short limbs and direct development (i.e., there is no free-living larval stage); the eggs are deposited in burrows. Maximum snout–vent length is between 27–48 mm (1.1–1.9 in) in males and between 43–65 mm (1.7–2.6 in) in females, depending on the species. Males often have larger tympani than females. No discs are present on fingers or toes. Species identification is based on male advertisement calls, features of hands and feet, and distribution.

== Species ==
There are six recognized species:

- Probreviceps durirostris, Snouted forest frog Loader, Channing, Menegon & Davenport, 2006
- Probreviceps loveridgei, Loveridge's forest frog Parker, 1931
- Probreviceps macrodactylus, Large-fingered forest frog (Nieden, 1926)
- Probreviceps rhodesianus, Highland forest frog Poynton & Broadley, 1967
- Probreviceps rungwensis, Rungwe forest frog Loveridge, 1932
- Probreviceps uluguruensis, Uluguru forest frog (Loveridge, 1925)
