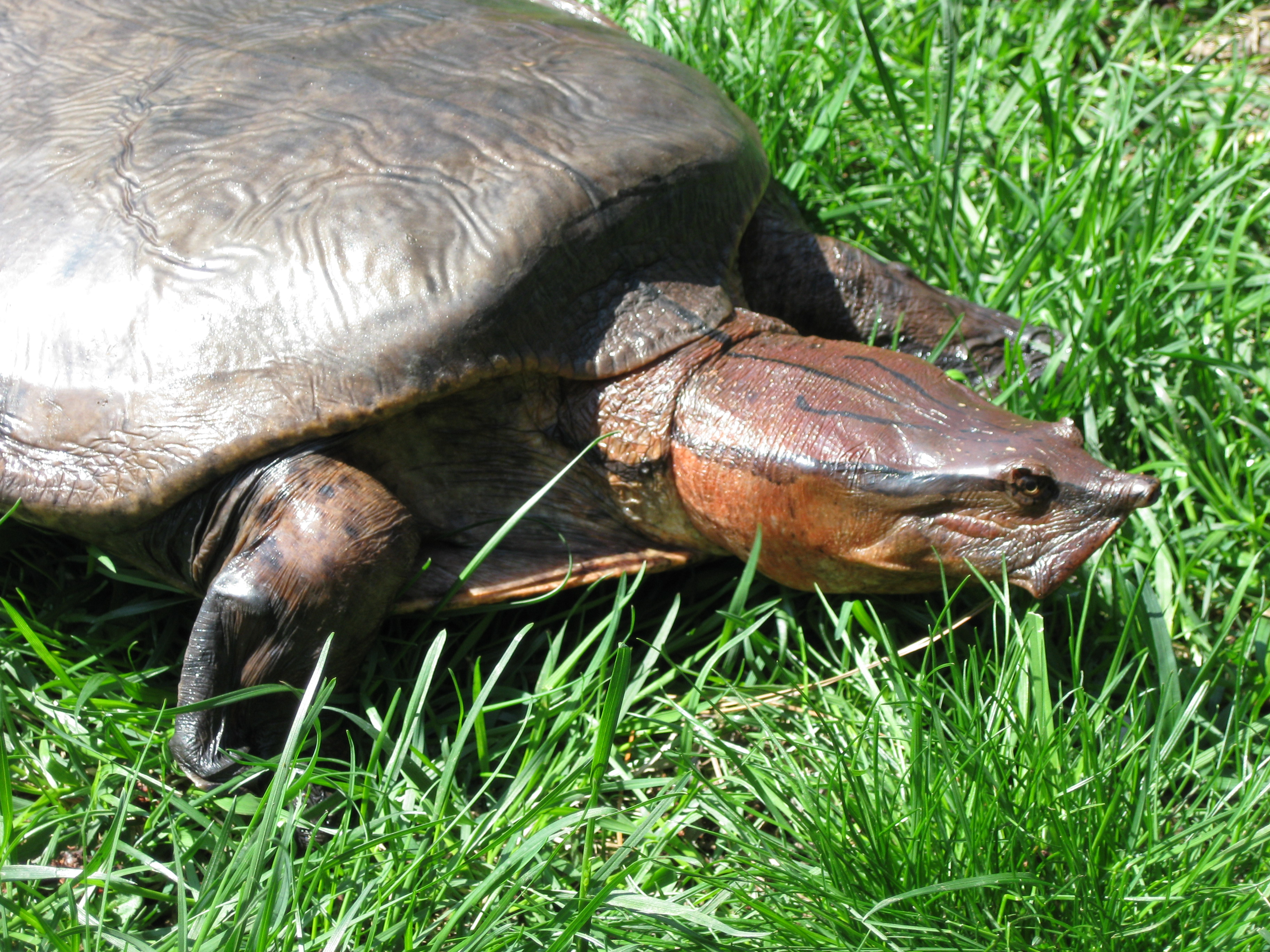

Conservation status
- Vulnerable (IUCN 3.1)
- CITES Appendix II

Scientific classification
- Kingdom: Animalia
- Phylum: Chordata
- Class: Reptilia
- Order: Testudines
- Suborder: Cryptodira
- Family: Trionychidae
- Genus: Cycloderma
- Species: C. aubryi

Binomial name
- Cycloderma aubryi (A.H.A. Duméril, 1856)

Synonyms
- Cryptopus aubryi A.H.A. Duméril, 1856; Cryptopodus aubryi — A.H.A. Duméril, 1856; Cycloderma aubryi — A.H.A. Duméril, 1860; Heptathyra aubryi — Cope, 1860

= Aubry's flapshell turtle =

Species of turtle

Aubry's flapshell turtle (Cycloderma aubryi) is a species of softshell turtle in the family Trionychidae. The species is endemic to Central Africa.

== Etymology ==
The specific name, aubryi, is in honor of Charles Eugène Aubry-Lecomte (1821–1879), who was a French civil servant and an amateur naturalist.

== Geographic range ==
C. aubryi is found in the Democratic Republic of Congo, Gabon, the Cabinda Province of Angola and likely in the Central African Republic.

== Habitat ==
The preferred natural habitats of C. aubryi are forest and freshwater wetlands, at altitudes up to 500 m (1,600 ft).

== Diet ==
Adults of C. aubryi prey upon crabs, crayfish, and fish. Juveniles may also eat insects.

== Conservation status ==
In 2017, the IUCN listed C. aubryi as vulnerable.
