= Kazuma Pan National Park =

National park in Zimbabwe

- IUCN category II (national park)
- Interactive map of Kazuma Pan National Park
- Location: Zimbabwe
- Coordinates: 18°22′S 25°42′E
- Area: 313 km^{2} (121 sq mi)
- Established: 1949 and then 1975

Kazuma Pan National Park is situated in Zimbabwe's extreme north-western corner, lying on the Botswana border a short distance north-west of Hwange National Park. Some 77,345 acres (313 km^{2}) in area, it provides one of Zimbabwe's few areas of plains scenery, with good visibility and sparse but important mammal populations.

== Flora and fauna ==
Kazuma Pan is virtually unspoilt wilderness with an open landscape of grassy plains which is reminiscent of the great East African plains and is thus dissimilar to the usual Zimbabwean bush or woodland landscapes. Within the Park there are a series of pans, some of which are kept continuously filled by water pumped from boreholes during the dry season. This permanent water source causes large concentrations of wildlife to seasonally migrate between Botswana and Zimbabwe, especially towards the end of the dry season from September through to the first rains of November or December.

Wildlife to be seen in Kazuma Pan National Park include lion, leopard, Southern giraffe, common zebra, gemsbok, roan antelope, sable antelope, tsessebe, common eland and Southern reedbuck. African elephant and Cape buffalo are present in large numbers towards the end of the dry season when water is scarce elsewhere. White rhinoceros can also be frequently seen. A special species to the Kazuma Pan National Park is the oribi, a small antelope, which is rather rare in Zimbabwe. Cheetah or African wild dog are still present though rare but lions are fairly common.

Much of the park consists of grassland, fringed by mopane and Kalahari sand woodlands. There are a series of seasonally flooded pans in the south-west of the park attracts a wide variety of waterfowl. The pan systems are also ideal habitat to a large variety of water birds, with a number of species including storks, crowned cranes, stilts, cormorants, ducks and kingfishers occurring throughout the area.

Kazuma Pan was proclaimed a National Park in 1949, but was deproclaimed in 1964 as no development had taken place. It regained its National Park status under the Parks and Wild Life Act (1975). There is no accommodation within the park but camping is allowed at two undeveloped camp sites, with permission from the Department of National Parks and Wild Life Management.

== Notes ==
This park is considered for inclusion in the 5 Nation Kavango - Zambezi Transfrontier Conservation Area.
