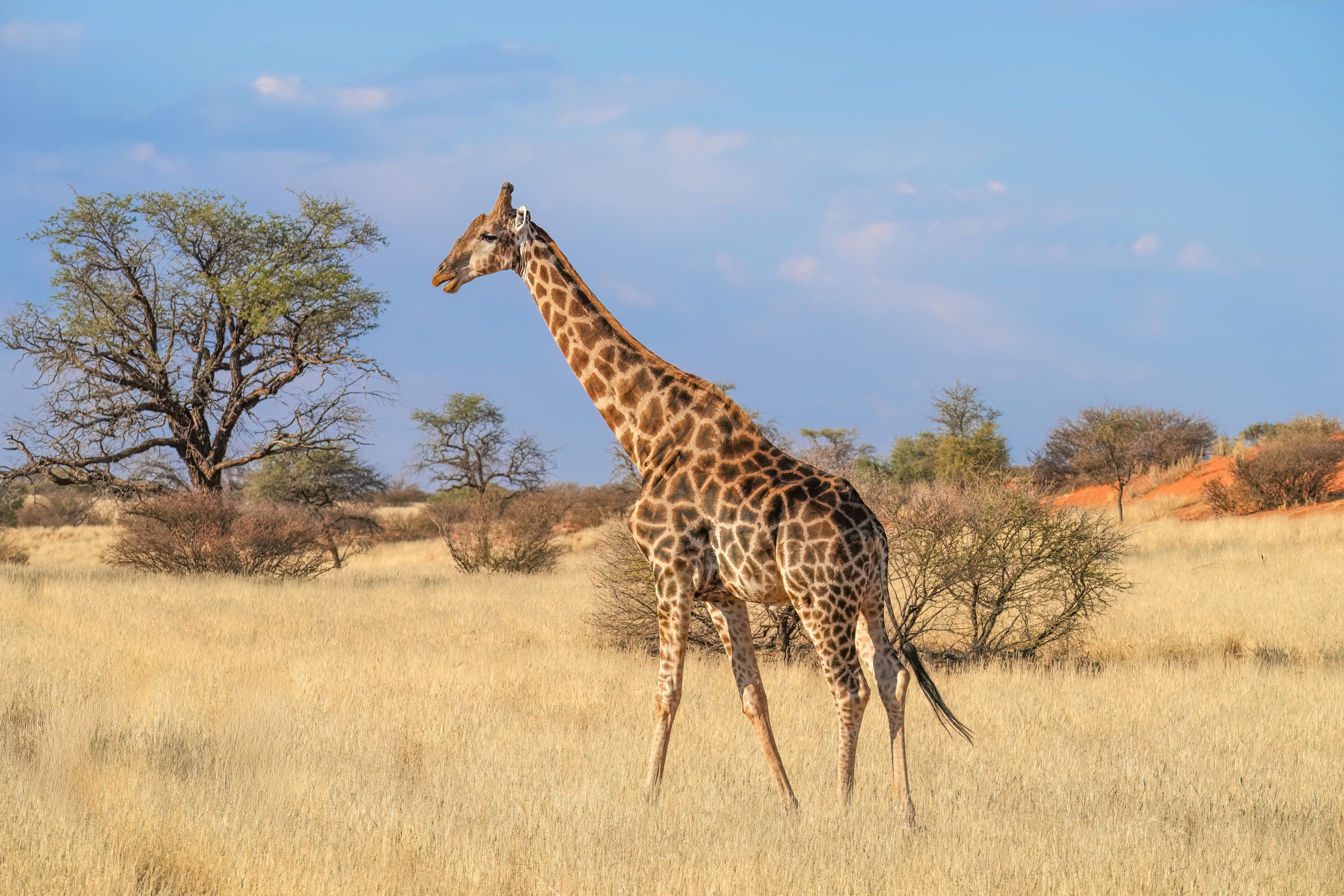
- In the Kalahari Desert of Namibia.

Conservation status
- Least Concern (IUCN 3.1)

Scientific classification
- Kingdom: Animalia
- Phylum: Chordata
- Class: Mammalia
- Order: Artiodactyla
- Family: Giraffidae
- Genus: Giraffa
- Species: G. giraffa
- Subspecies: G. g. angolensis

Trinomial name
- Giraffa giraffa angolensis Lydekker, 1903
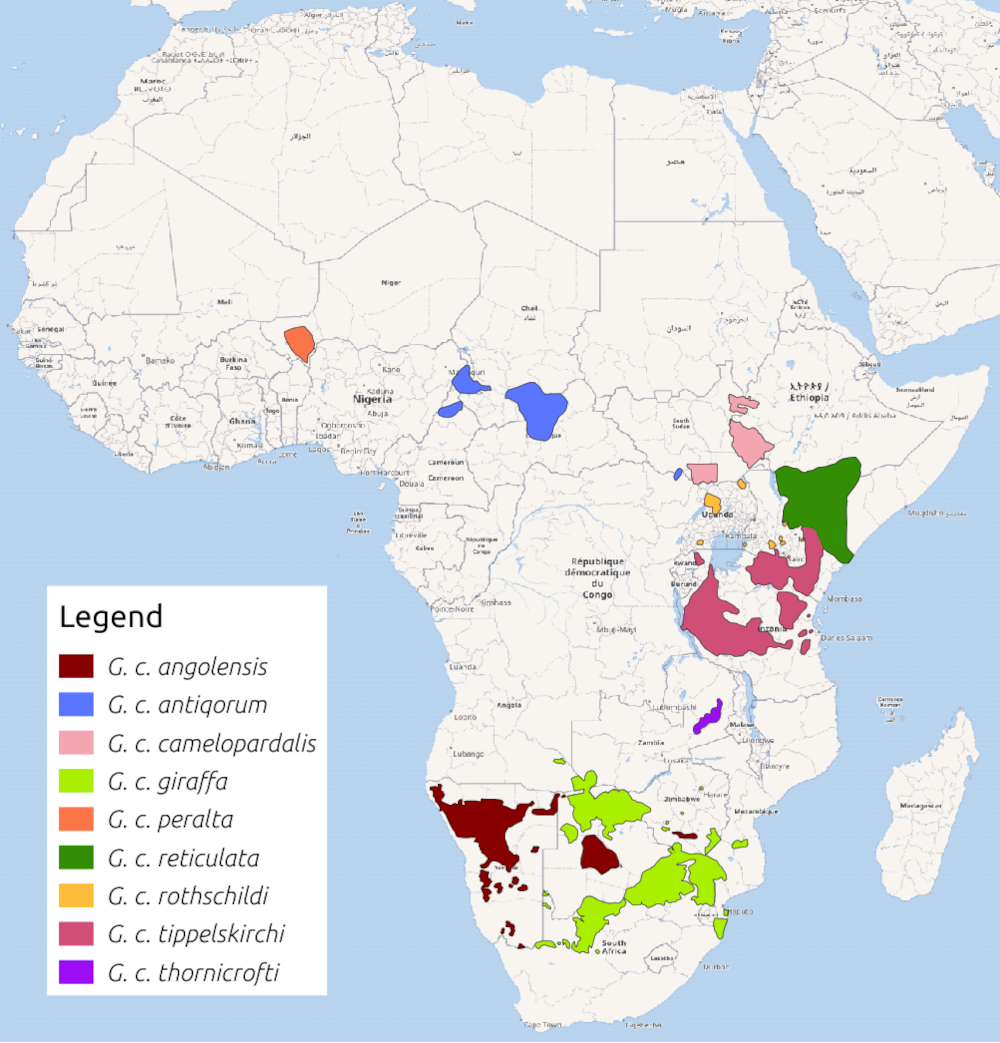
- Range in maroon

= Angolan giraffe =

Subspecies of southern giraffe

The Angolan giraffe (Giraffa giraffa angolensis), formerly (Giraffa camelopardalis angolensis) also known as the Namibian giraffe or smokey giraffe, is a subspecies of the Southern Giraffe that is found in northern Namibia, south-western Zambia, Botswana, western Zimbabwe and since mid-2023 again in Angola, after its reintroduction to Iona National Park.

== Taxonomy ==
In August 2025 after reviewing the scientific evidence the IUCN's Giraffe and Okapi Specialist Group recognised four distinct species of giraffe, the Northern Giraffe, Reticulated Giraffe, Masai Giraffe and Southern Giraffe. The Angolan Giraffe is now one of two subspecies of the Southern Giraffe. A previous 2009 genetic study on this subspecies suggests the northern Namib Desert and Etosha National Park populations each form a separate subspecies. However, genetic studies based on mitochondrial DNA do not support the division into two subspecies., but could identify giraffes in southern Zimbabwe as the Angolan giraffe, suggesting a further eastward distribution than expected.

== Description ==
This subspecies has large brown blotches with edges that are either somewhat notched or have angular extensions. The spotting pattern extends throughout the legs but not the upper part of the face. The neck and rump patches tend to be fairly small. The subspecies also has a white ear patch.

== Habitat ==
Home range size of giraffes was found to be larger in unproductive areas such as the Namib Desert and much smaller in more productive areas such as Lake Manyara National Park. However, that home range size could be affected by abiotic(e.g climate), biotic(e.g forage availability, predator densities) and human influence(e.g population growth).

== Seasonal movement ==
As far as seasonal movements of giraffes were concerned, they were not as distinctive as those in other giraffe populations around the world. Male giraffe moves longer than female giraffe and also it has longer average daily movement (5.64 km (3.50 mi) compared to 1.87 km (1.16 mi) in 6 months during hot-dry season).

== Foraged activity ==
Angolan Giraffe tends to forage into the mountain during the cold-dry and early hot-dry season. It mainly eats Commiphora for living.

== Conservation ==
Approximately 13,000 animals are estimated to remain in the wild; and about 20 are kept in zoos.

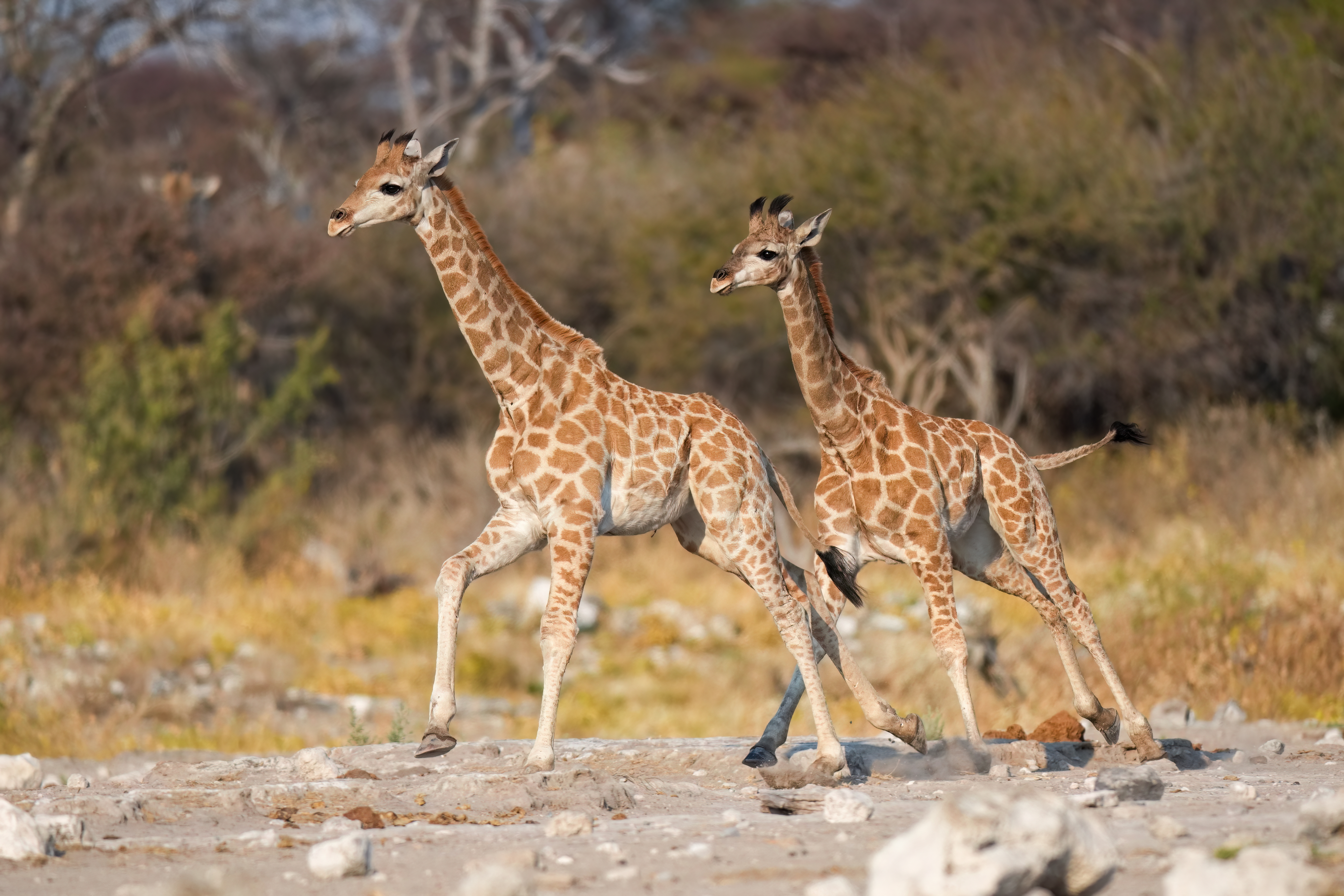
Babies running after each other in Etosha National Park

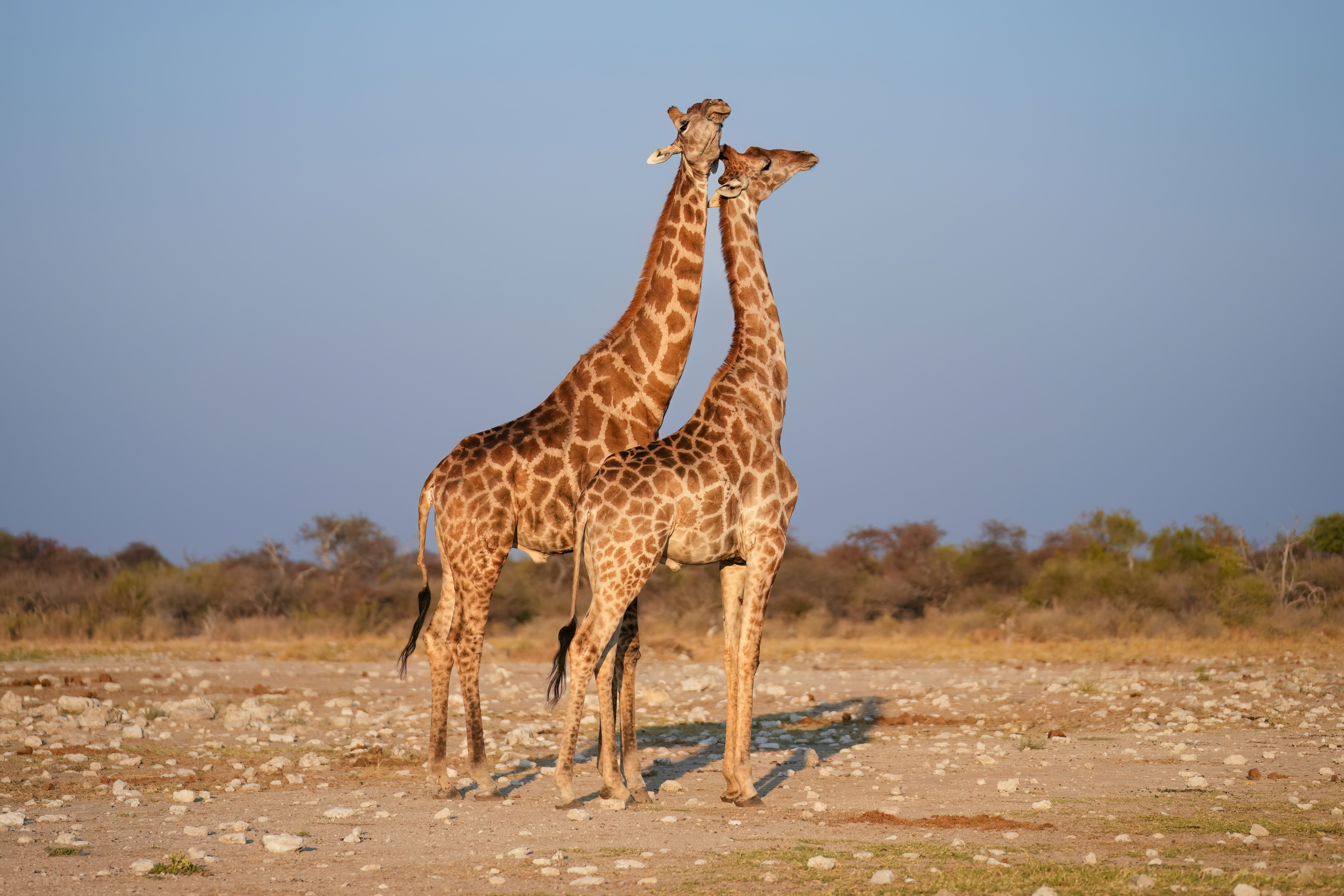
Adults cuddling in Etosha National Park

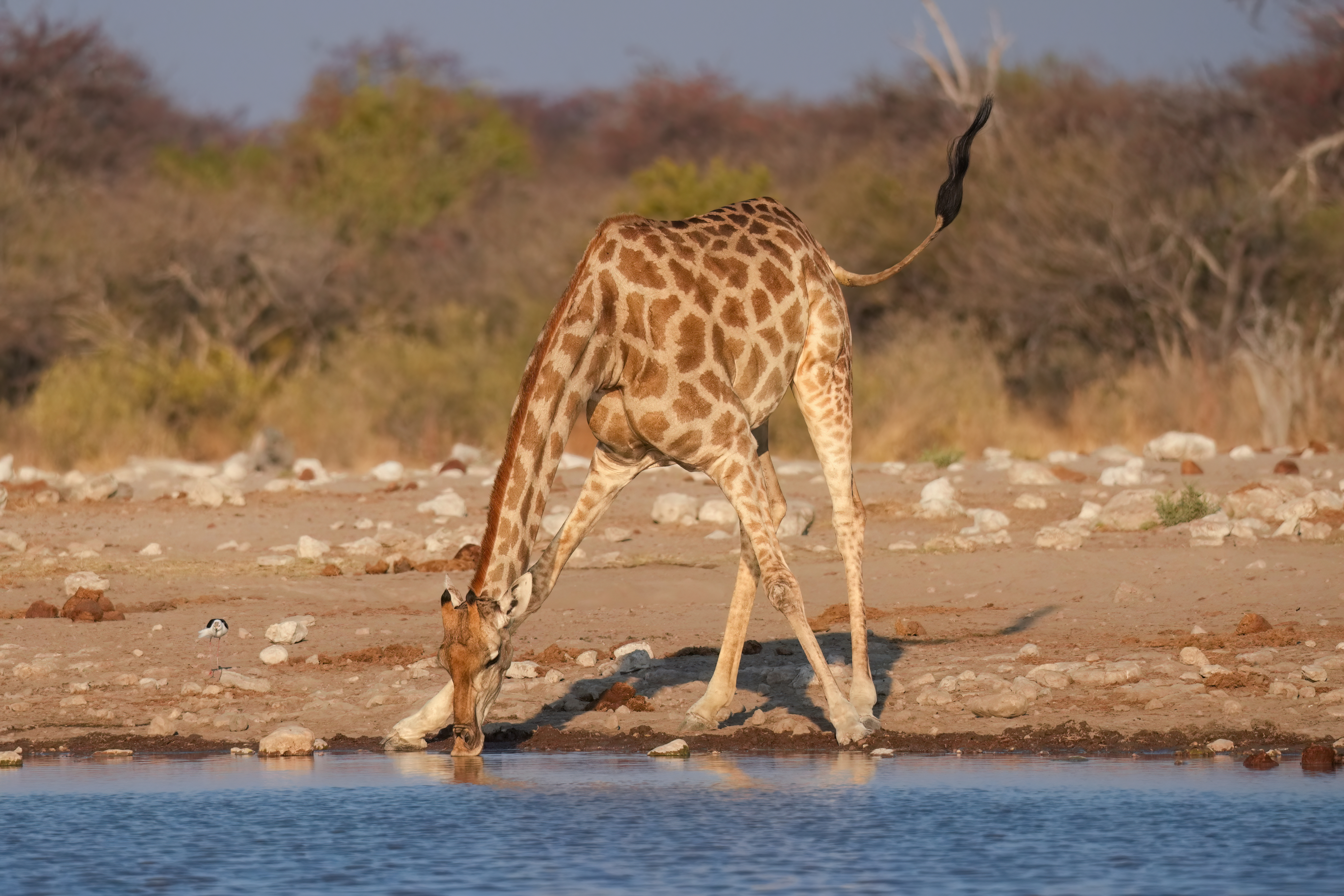
Drinking in Etosha National Park

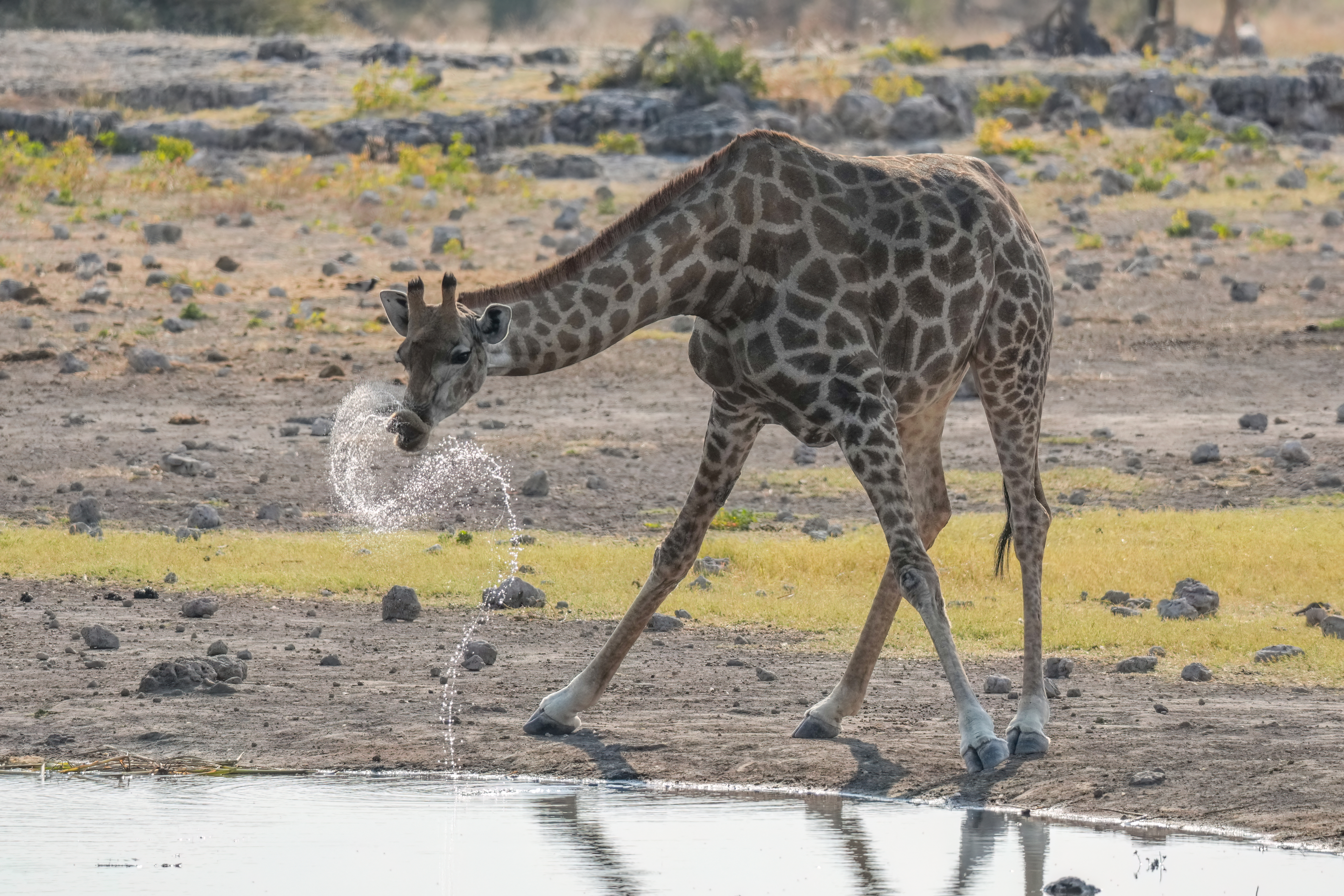
Spitting in Etosha National Park

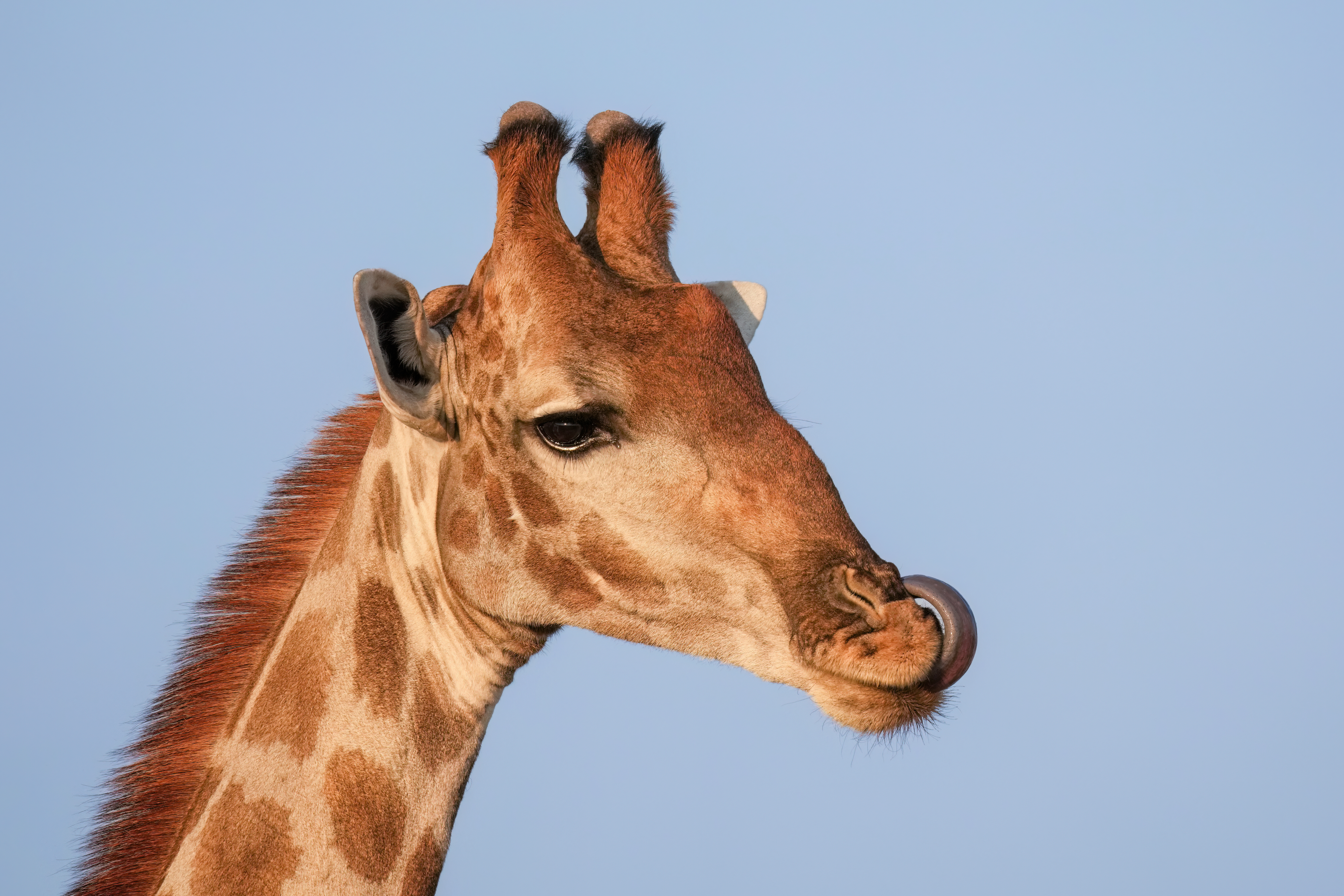
Licking its nose in Etosha National Park

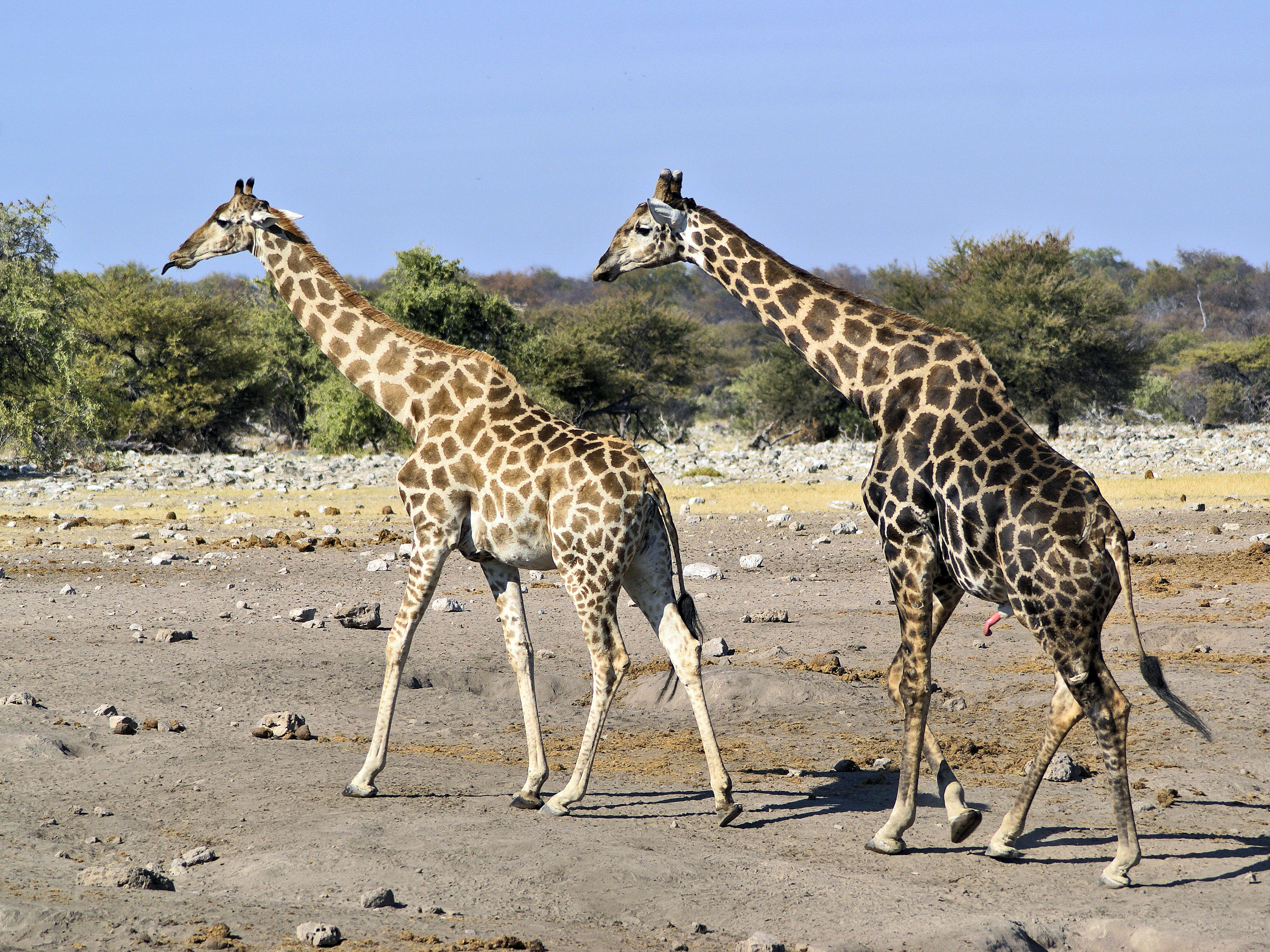
Courting
Etosha National Park

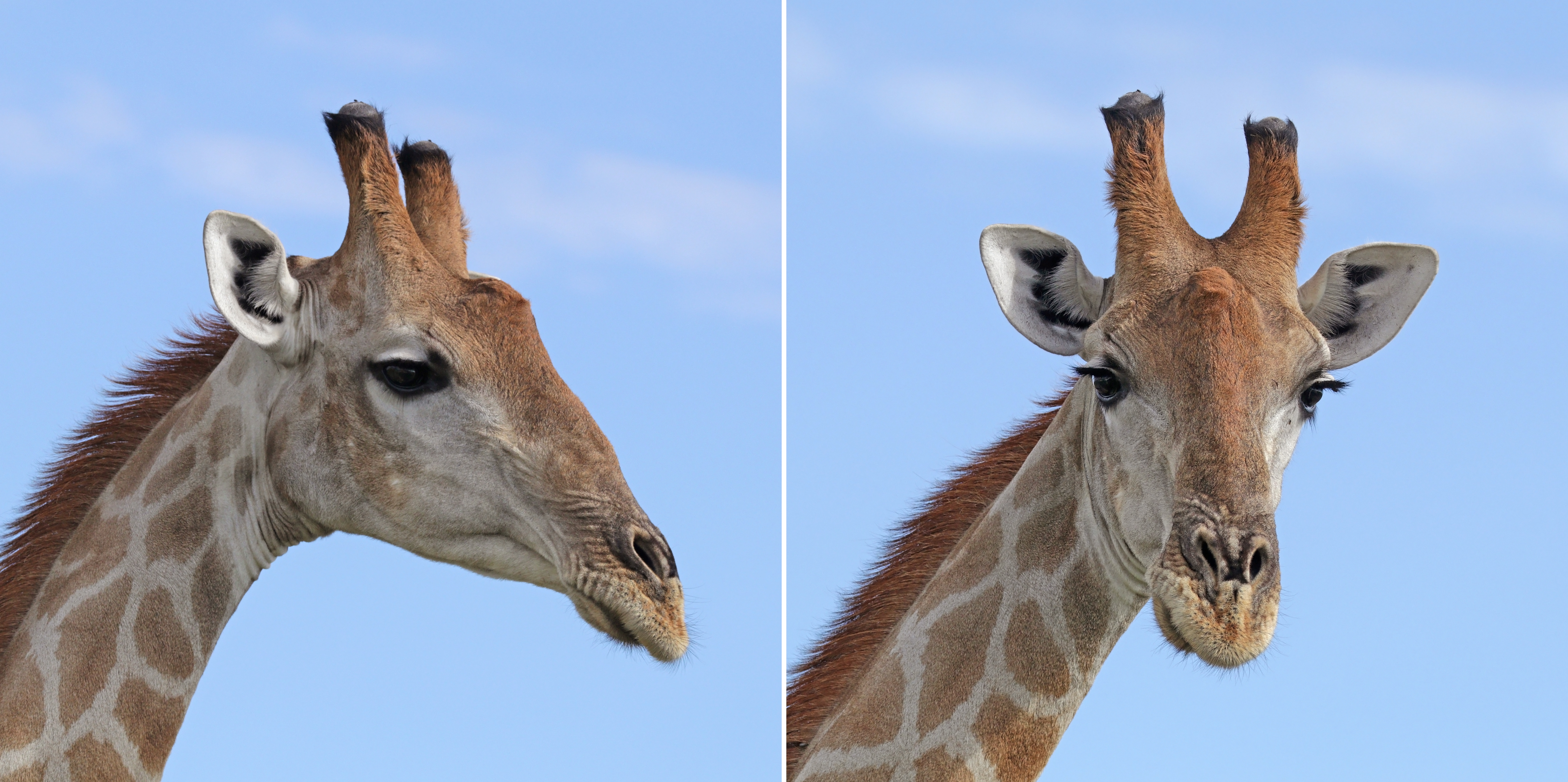
Male
Etosha National Park

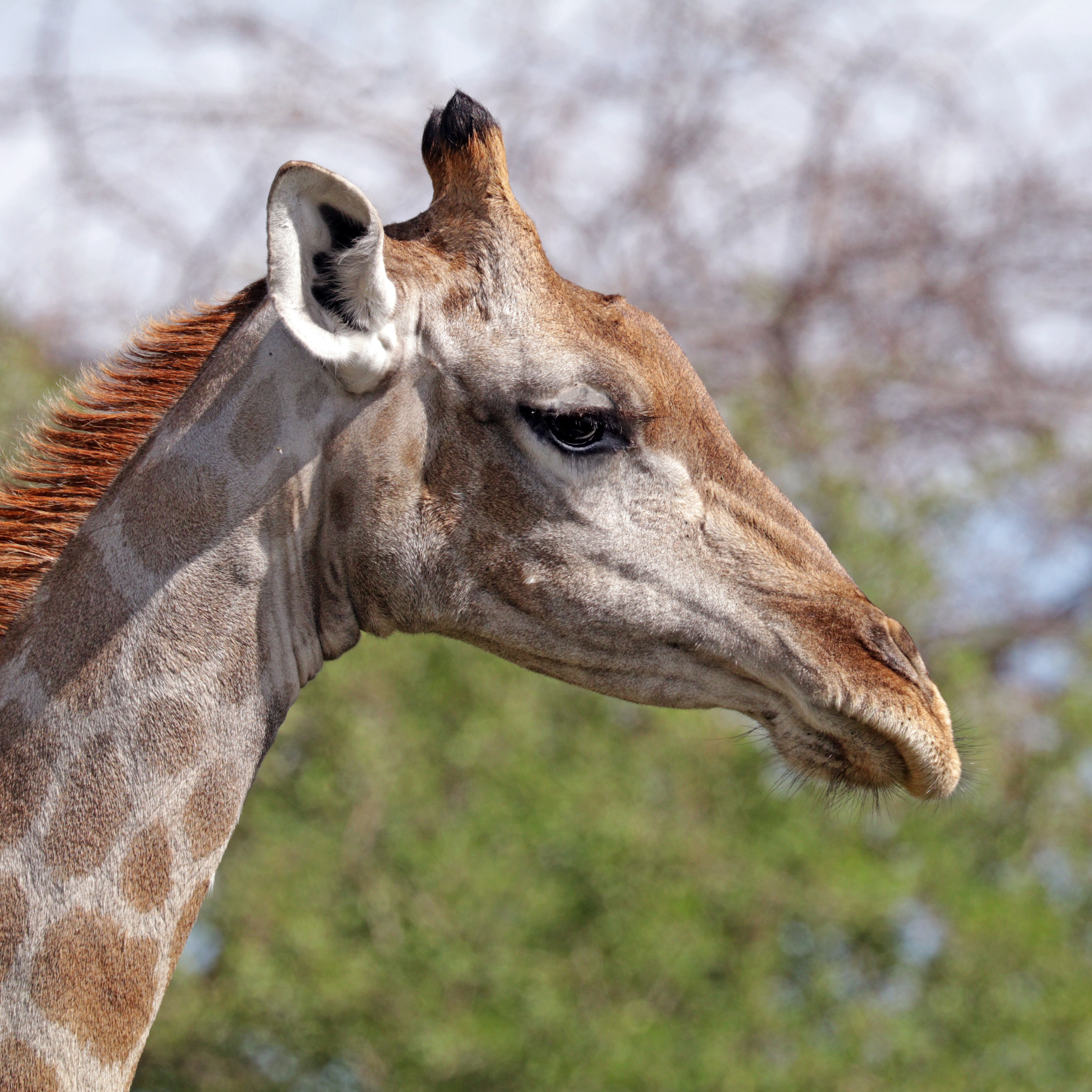
Female
Etosha National Park

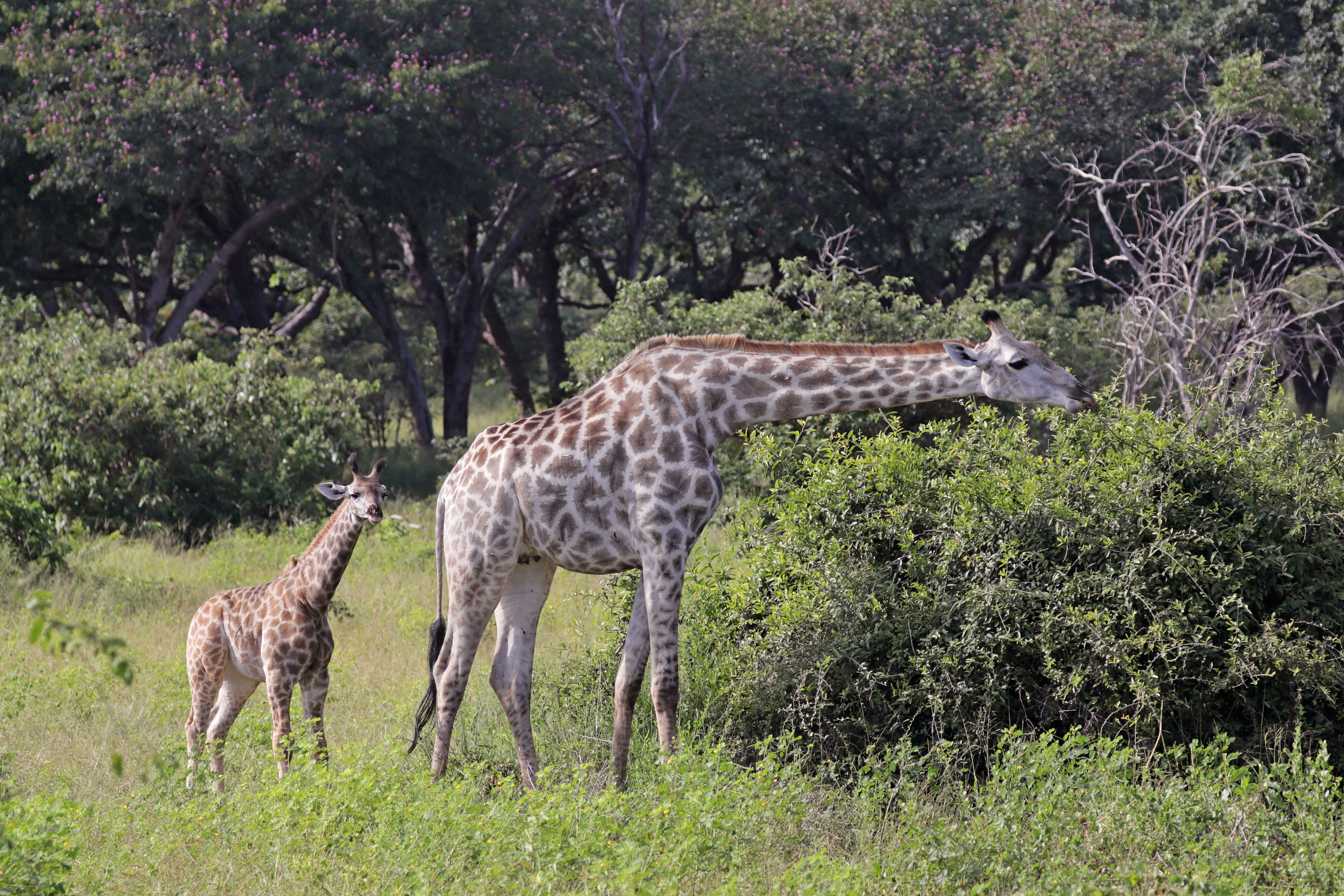
Female with young 2 months
Chobe National Park

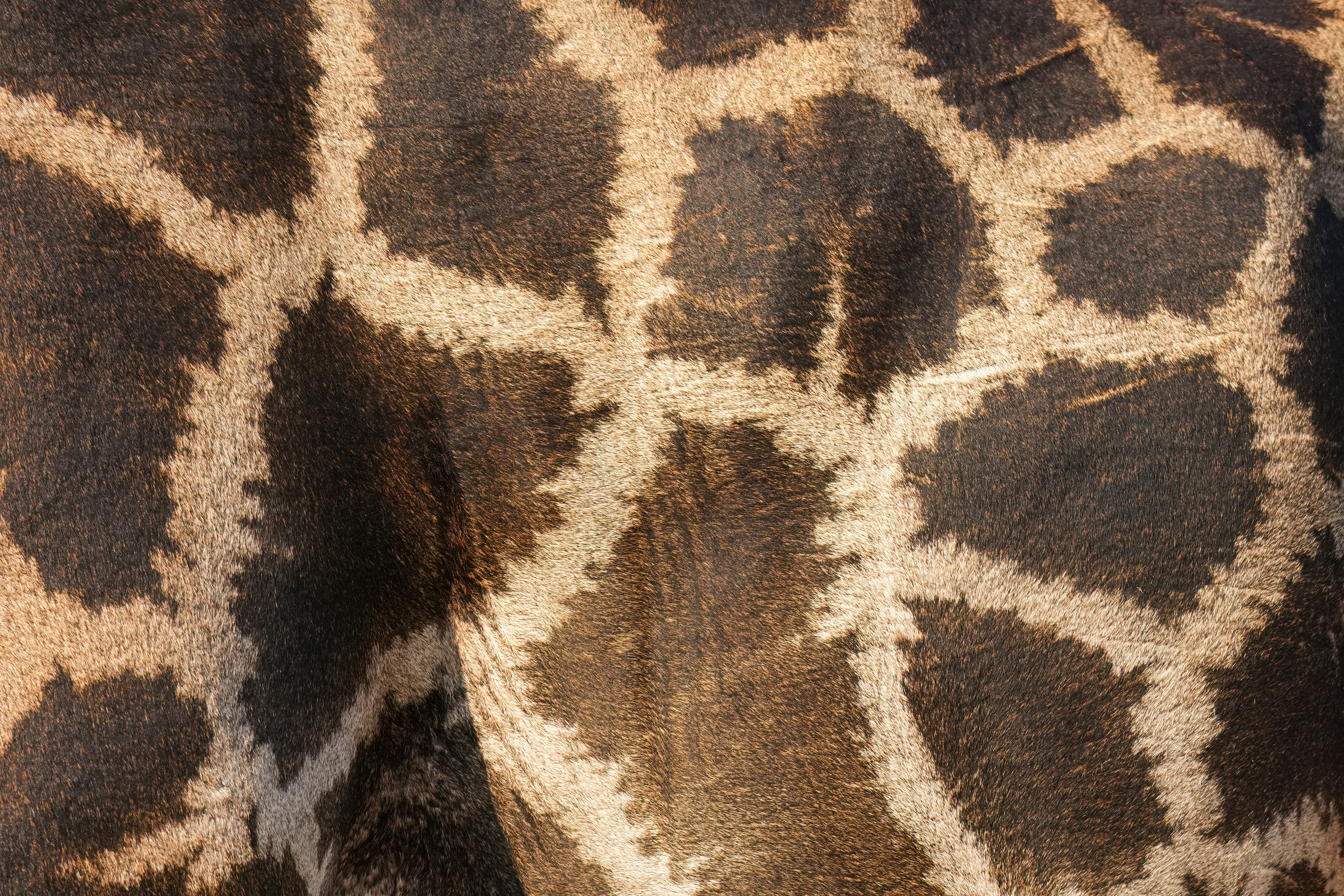
Hair patterns close-up

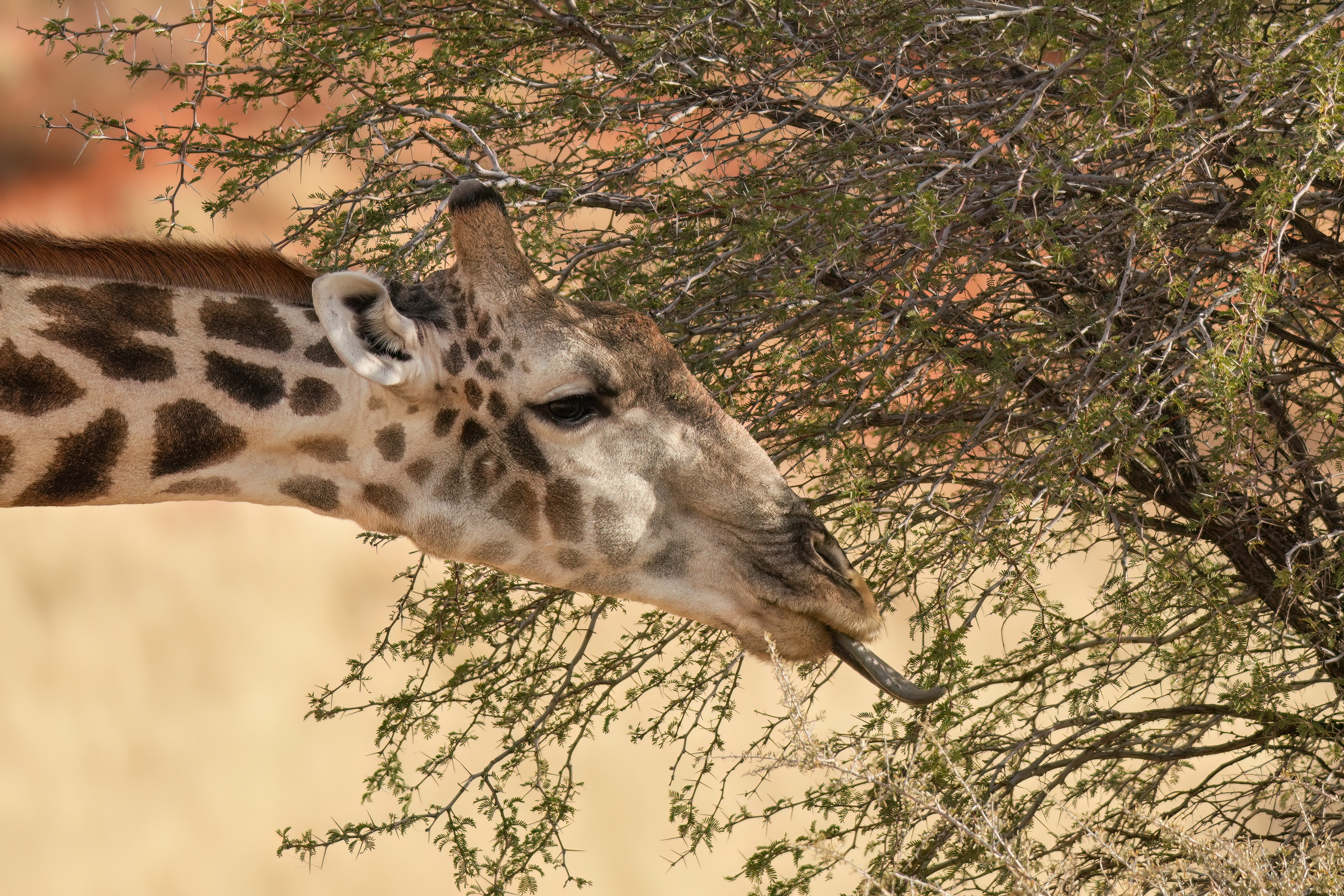
Eating from an acacia tree
