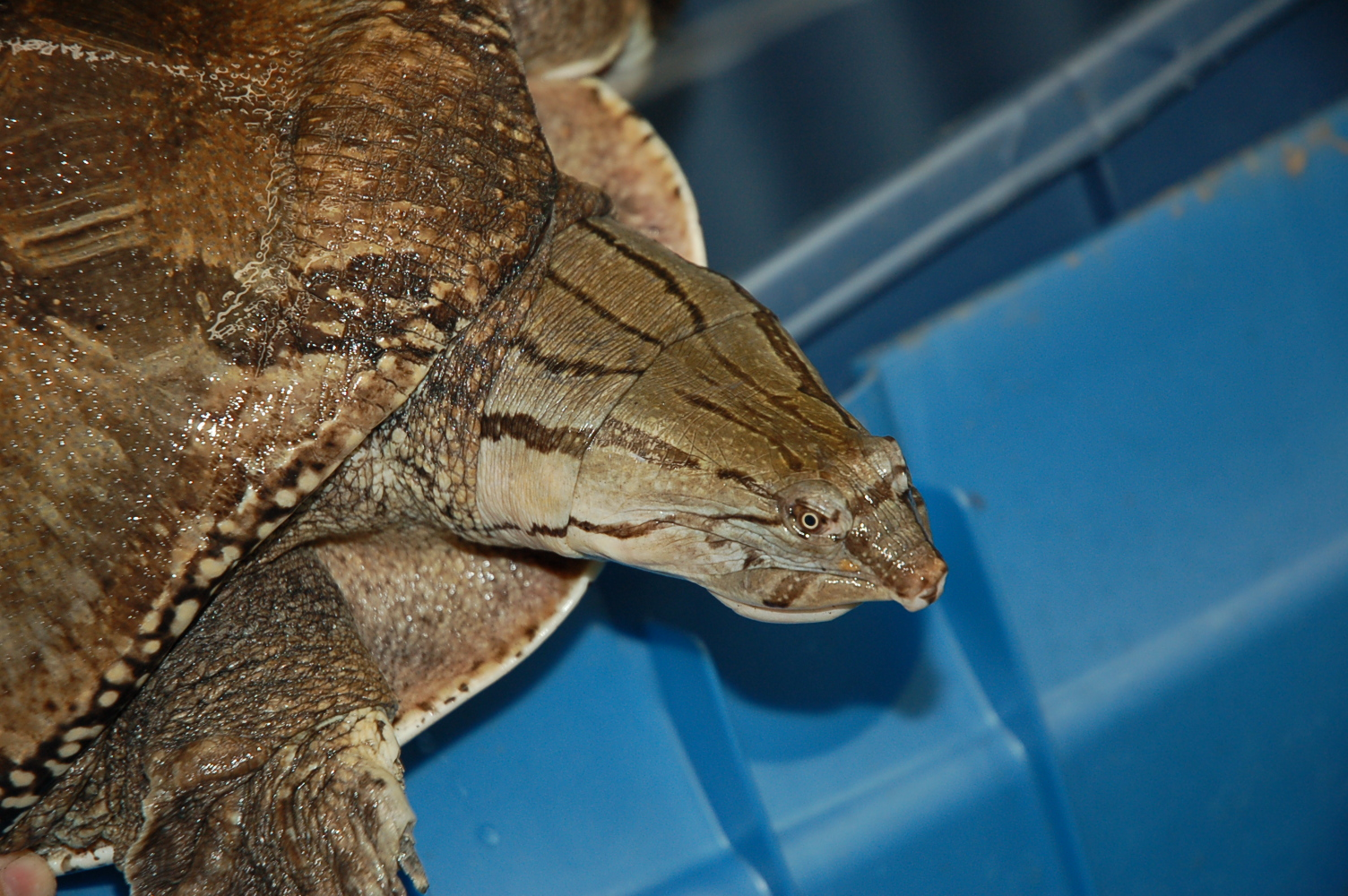
- Head of a Cycloderma frenatum

Conservation status
- Endangered (IUCN 3.1)
- CITES Appendix II

Scientific classification
- Kingdom: Animalia
- Phylum: Chordata
- Class: Reptilia
- Order: Testudines
- Suborder: Cryptodira
- Family: Trionychidae
- Genus: Cycloderma
- Species: C. frenatum

Binomial name
- Cycloderma frenatum W. Peters, 1854

Synonyms
- Cycloderma frenatum W. Peters, 1854; Cyclanosteus frenatus — Gray, 1856; Aspidochelys livingstonii Gray, 1860; Heptathyra frenata — Gray, 1864; Heptathyra livingstonii — Gray, 1864; Gymnopus subplanus A.M.C. Duméril & Bibron, 1835; Amyda subplana — Fitzinger, 1843; Dogania subplana — Gray, 1844; Trionyx frenatus — Gray, 1856; Dogania guentheri Gray, 1862; Trionyx guentheri — Günther, 1864; Potamochelys frenatus — Gray, 1864

= Zambezi flapshell turtle =

Species of turtle

The Zambezi flapshell turtle (Cycloderma frenatum) is a species of softshell turtle in the family Trionychidae). Within its family, C. frenatum belongs to the smaller, and exclusively Old World, subfamily Cyclanorbinae.

== Geographic range ==
C. frenatum is found in southeastern Africa, in the countries of Malawi, Mozambique, Tanzania, Zambia, and Zimbabwe, and mainly in the Zambezi basin.

== Conservation status ==
C. frenatum is becoming rare due to habitat loss.

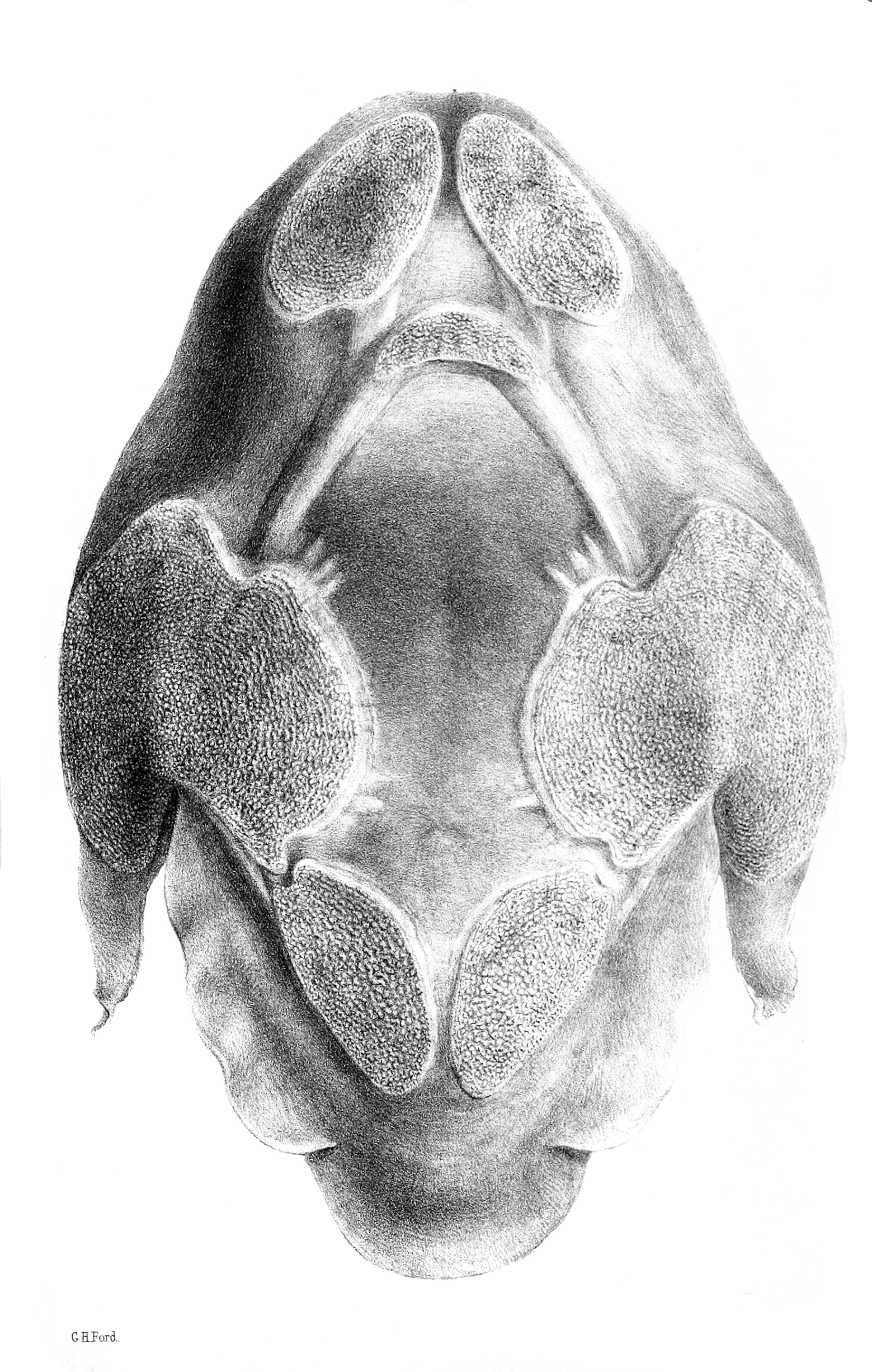
Plastron with the peculiar hindleg flaps
