= Probreviceps rhodesianus =

Conservation status
- Endangered (IUCN 3.1)

Scientific classification
- Kingdom: Animalia
- Phylum: Chordata
- Class: Amphibia
- Order: Anura
- Family: Brevicipitidae
- Genus: Probreviceps
- Species: P. rhodesianus

Binomial name
- Probreviceps rhodesianus Poynton and Broadley, 1967

Species of frog

Probreviceps rhodesianus is a species of frog in the family Brevicipitidae. At present, it is only known from three localities in the Eastern Highlands of Zimbabwe north of Mutare; it is thus endemic to that country. However, it is possible that its range extends to adjacent Mozambique. This species has many common names: forest rain frog, highland primitive rain frog, highland rain frog, and Zimbabwe big-fingered frog.

== Description ==
Males grow to 35 mm (1.4 in) and females to 49 mm (1.9 in) in snout–vent length. The tympanum is clearly visible. Skin is densely granular but has no ridges nor larger warts. Males have looser gular skin than females. The cloacal opening in both sexes has an unusual, ventrally deflected position and is surrounded by deep skin folds; the functional significance of this remains unknown.

== Habitat and conservation ==
Its natural habitats are primary montane forests above 1,500 m (4,900 ft). It is a terrestrial species that is usually found under rotten logs or under accumulations of leaf litter, formed, e.g., on the uphill side of logs. Eggs are laid terrestrially (in chamber in humus) and develop directly into froglets.

This species is believed to be reasonably common, although its range is small and there are no recorded sightings since 1985. It is threatened by habitat loss, logging, and trampling. It is present in the Nyanga National Park, but the aforementioned threats are present in the park too.
