= Probreviceps macrodactylus =

Conservation status
- Endangered (IUCN 3.1)

Scientific classification
- Kingdom: Animalia
- Phylum: Chordata
- Class: Amphibia
- Order: Anura
- Family: Brevicipitidae
- Genus: Probreviceps
- Species: P. macrodactylus

Binomial name
- Probreviceps macrodactylus (Nieden, 1926)

Synonyms
- Breviceps macrodactylus Nieden, 1926; Breviceps usambaricus Barbour and Loveridge, 1928

Species of frog

Probreviceps macrodactylus is a species of frog in the family Brevicipitidae. It is endemic to Tanzania. Its natural habitats are subtropical or tropical moist lowland forests, subtropical or tropical moist montane forests, rural gardens, and heavily degraded former forest. It is threatened by habitat loss.
