= Flame lily =

Flame lily is a common name for several plants and may refer to:

- Gloriosa superba
- Lilium philadelphicum
