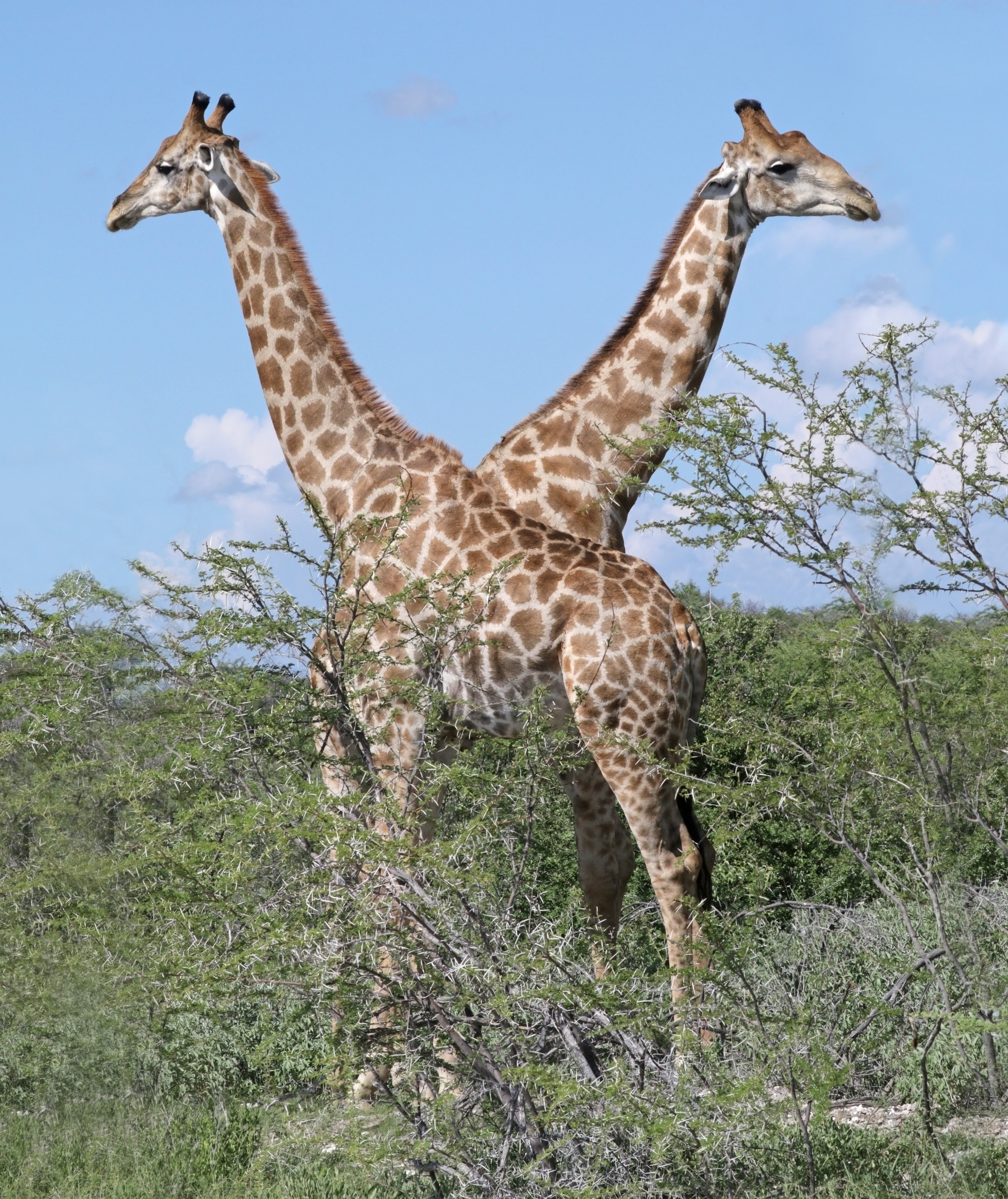
- Male Angolan giraffes in Etosha National Park, Namibia.

Conservation status
- Not recognized (IUCN 3.1)

Scientific classification
- Kingdom: Animalia
- Phylum: Chordata
- Class: Mammalia
- Order: Artiodactyla
- Family: Giraffidae
- Genus: Giraffa
- Species: G. giraffa

Binomial name
- Giraffa giraffa (von Schreber, 1784)

= Southern giraffe =

Species of giraffe

The southern giraffe (Giraffa giraffa), also known as two-horned giraffe, is a species of giraffe native to Southern Africa. The IUCN recognises four giraffe species, with several recognised subspecies.

Southern giraffes have rounded or blotched spots, some with star-like extensions on a light tan background, running down to the hooves. They range from South Africa, Angola, Namibia, Botswana, Zambia, Zimbabwe, Mozambique. Their approximate population is composed of 44,500 to 50,000 individuals.

Giraffes are considered Vulnerable to extinction by the IUCN.

== Taxonomy and evolution ==
Living giraffes were originally classified as one species by Carl Linnaeus in 1758, under the binomial name Cervus camelopardalis. Morten Thrane Brünnich classified the genus Giraffa in 1772. Once considered a subspecies of the conglomerate Giraffa camelopardalis species, recent studies proposed the southern giraffe as a separate species of a reorganised genus Giraffa, under the binomial name Giraffa giraffa.

=== Subspecies ===
Subspecies of Southern giraffe
Subspecies	Description	Image
Angolan giraffe (G. g. angolensis), also known as Namibian Giraffe	Is found in Southern Angola, northern Namibia, south-western Zambia, Botswana, and western Zimbabwe. A 2009 genetic study on this subspecies suggests the northern Namib Desert and Etosha National Park populations each form a separate subspecies. This subspecies has large brown blotches with edges that are either somewhat notched or have angular extensions. The spotting pattern extends throughout the legs but not the upper part of the face. The neck and rump patches tend to be fairly small. The subspecies also has a white ear patch. Around 13,000 animals are estimated to remain in the wild; and about 20 are kept in zoos.	
South African giraffe (G. g. giraffa), also known as Cape giraffe	Is found in northern South Africa, southern Botswana, southern Zimbabwe, Eswatini, south-western Mozambique. and Malawi It has dark, somewhat rounded patches "with some fine projections" on a tawny background colour. The spots extend down the legs and get smaller. The median lump of males is less developed. Approximately 31,500 are estimated to remain in the wild, and around 45 are kept in zoos.	

== Descriptions ==
The South African subspecies of the southern giraffe has dark, somewhat rounded patches "with some fine projections" on a tawny background colour. The spots extend down the legs and get smaller. The median lump of bulls is less developed.

== Distribution and habitat ==
The southern giraffes live in the savannahs and woodlands of northern South Africa, Angola, southern Botswana, southern Zimbabwe, Zambia and south-western Mozambique. After local extinctions in various places, South African giraffes have been reintroduced in many parts of Southern Africa, including Eswatini, Majete Game Reserve in Malawi, and Maputo and Zinave National Parks in Mozambique, the Angolan giraffe has been reintroduced to the Cuatir Conservation Area in Southern Angola and starting in 2023 Iona National Park on the north bank of the Cunene River.

They are common in both inside and outside of protected areas.

== Ecology and behavior ==
Southern giraffes usually live in savannahs and woodlands where food plants are available. Southern giraffes are herbivorous mammals. They feed on leaves, flowers, fruits and shoots of woody plants such as Acacia.

== Threats ==
Southern giraffes are not threatened, as their population is increasing.
