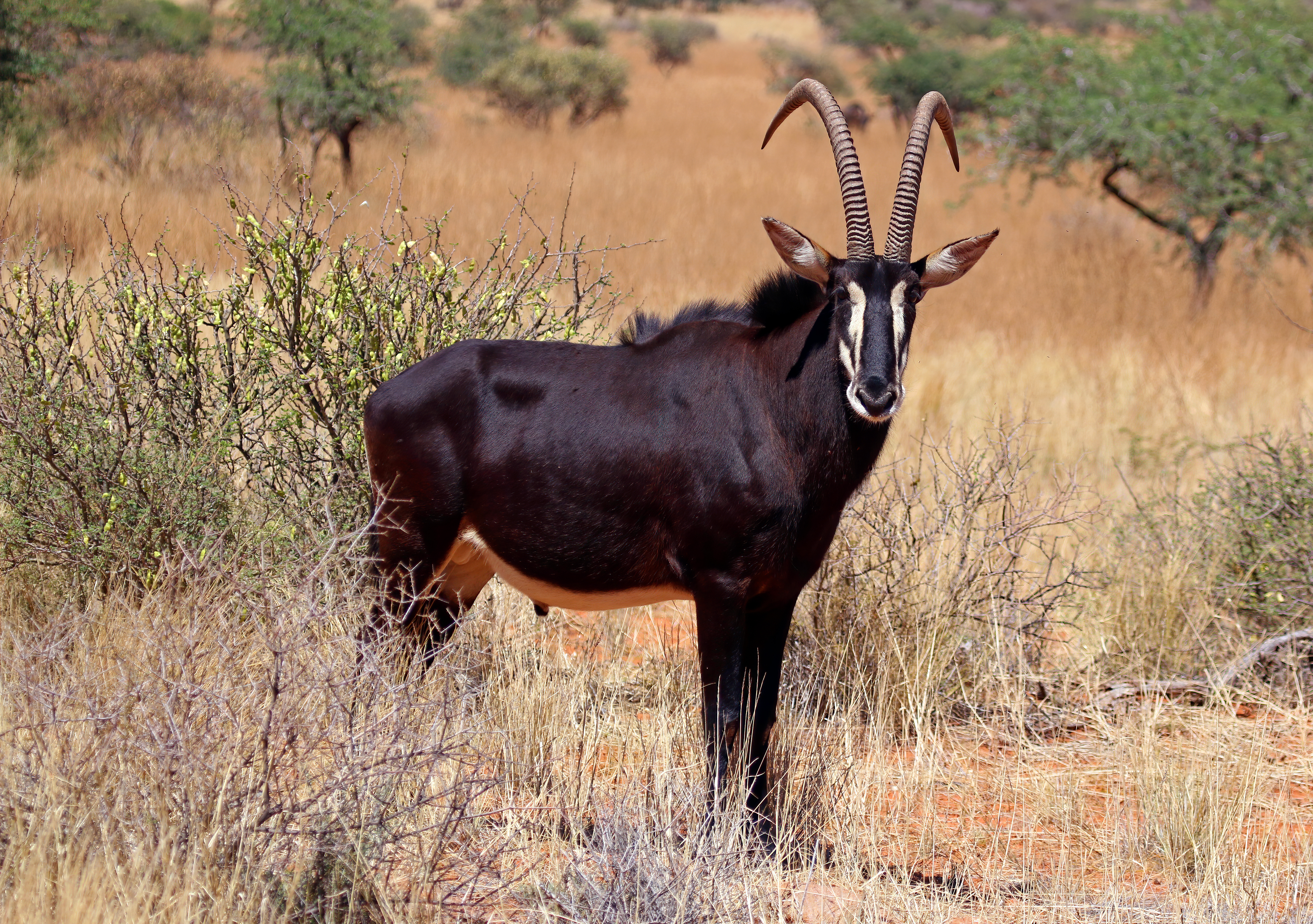
- Adult male or bull, Tswalu Kalahari Reserve, South Africa
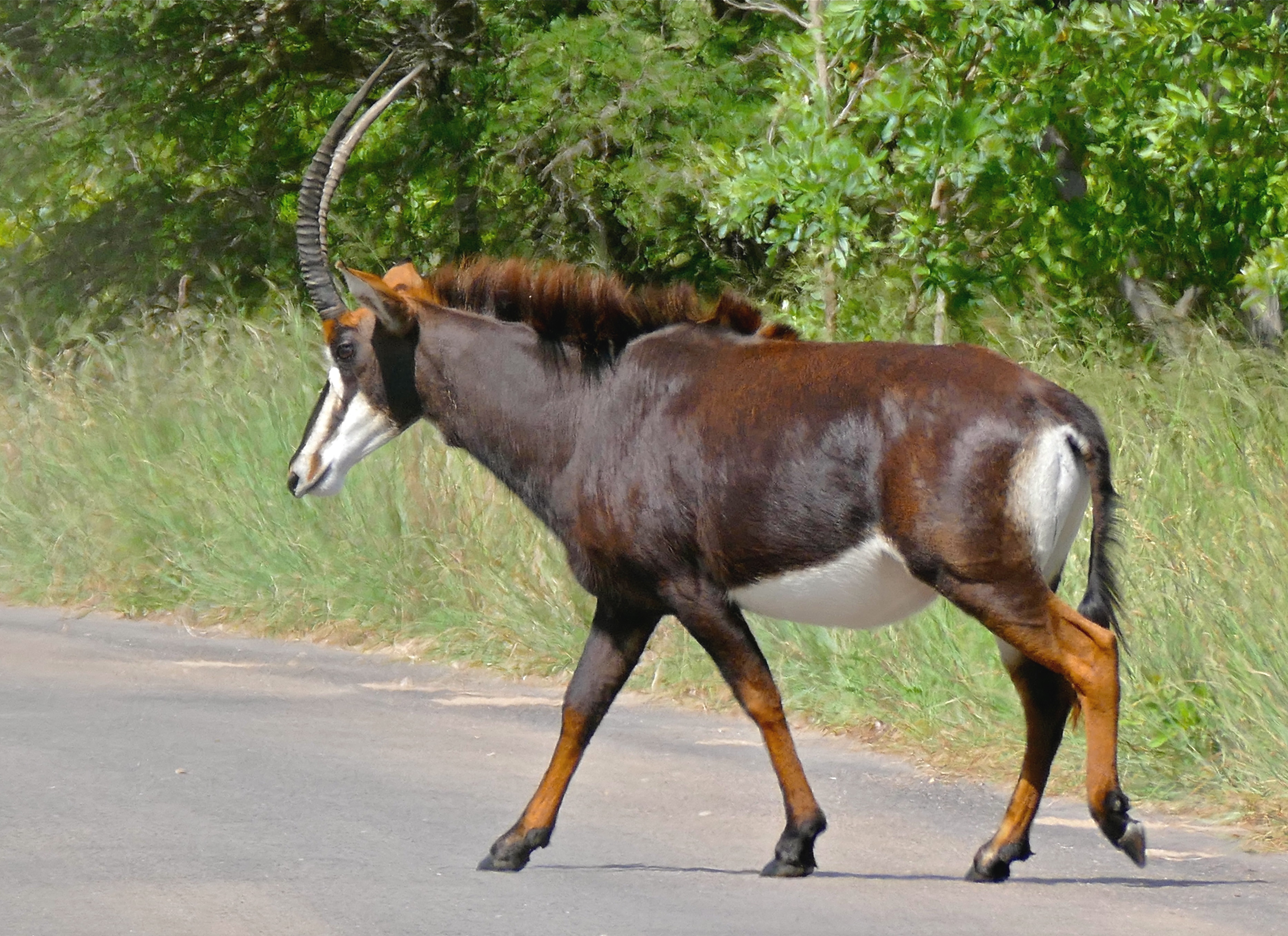
- Adult female or cow crossing the road in Kruger National Park, South Africa

Conservation status
- Least Concern (IUCN 3.1)

Scientific classification
- Kingdom: Animalia
- Phylum: Chordata
- Class: Mammalia
- Order: Artiodactyla
- Family: Bovidae
- Subfamily: Hippotraginae
- Genus: Hippotragus
- Species: H. niger

Binomial name
- Hippotragus niger (Harris, 1838)
- geographic range

= Sable antelope =

Species of mammal

The sable antelope (Hippotragus niger) is a large antelope which inhabits wooded savanna in East and Southern Africa, from the south of Kenya to South Africa, with a separated population in Angola.

== Taxonomy ==
The sable antelope shares the genus Hippotragus with the extinct bluebuck (H. leucophaeus) and the roan antelope (H. equinus), and is a member of the family Bovidae.

In 1996, an analysis of mitochondrial DNA extracted from a mounted specimen of the bluebuck showed that it is outside the clade containing the roan and sable antelopes. The cladogram below shows the position of the sable antelope among its relatives, following the 1996 analysis:

- - - blesbok (Damaliscus pygargus phillipsi)
    - bontebok (Damaliscus pygargus pygarus)
  - - bluebuck (Hippotragus leucophaeus)†extinct
    - - roan antelope (Hippotragus equinus)
      - sable antelope (Hippotragus niger)

=== Subspecies ===
Hipotragus niger has four subspecies:

- The southern sable antelope (H. n. niger; also known as the common sable antelope, black sable antelope, Matsetsi sable antelope or South Zambian sable antelope) is regarded as the nominate subspecies, as it was the first one to be described and named in 1838. Often referred to as the black sable antelope because it tends to have the darkest coat, this subspecies occurs south of the Zambezi River, particularly in northern Botswana and in large numbers in the Matsetsi Valley of Zimbabwe, but it is also found in South Africa. In South Africa, most of the commercial sable antelope farmers crossed their Matsetsi sable antelope (indigenous to South Africa) with Zambian sable antelope in the hope to move nearer to the nearly extinct giant sable antelope (that was larger with bigger horns). Currently, only about 15% pure Matsetsi sable antelopes are thought to exist in South Africa. The Matsetsi sable antelope population in Zimbabwe is only 450 (down from 24,000 in 1994). The sable antelope population in South Africa is about 7,000 (commercial and in reserves). Therefore, the Matsetsi sable antelope population apparently is less than 1,500 and declining. However, most of the sable antelope in the reserves are pure Matsetsi sable antelope. Anglo-American recently started a program of breeding pure Matsetsi sable antelope commercially and keeping them pure.
- The giant sable antelope (H. n. variani; also known as the royal sable antelope) is so named because both sexes are larger and their horns are recognizably longer. It is found only in a few remaining localities in central Angola. It is classified as Critically Endangered on the IUCN Red List and is listed on Appendix I of CITES.
- The Zambian sable antelope (H. n. kirkii; also known as the West Zambian sable antelope or West Tanzanian sable antelope) occurs in central Angola, western Zambia and Malawi and has the largest geographic range of the four subspecies, which extends north of the Zambezi River through Zambia, the eastern Democratic Republic of the Congo and Malawi into southwestern Tanzania. It is classified as Vulnerable.
- The eastern sable antelope (H. n. roosevelti; also known as the Shimba sable antelope) is the smallest of the four subspecies. It occurs in the coastal hinterlands of southern Kenya, particularly in the Shimba Hills National Reserve, and ranges through the region east of Tanzania's eastern escarpment and into northern Mozambique.

In English "great sable antelope", "sable" or the Swahili name mbarapi are sometimes used. An archaic term used in accounts of hunting expeditions in South Africa is "potaquaine"; the origin and exact application are unclear. Local names include swartwitpens (Afrikaans), kgama or phalafala (Sotho), mBarapi or palahala (Swahili), kukurugu, kwalat or kwalata (Tswana), ngwarati (Shona), iliza (Xhosa), impalampala (Zulu) and umtshwayeli (Ndebele).

== Description ==
The sable antelope is sexually dimorphic, with the male heavier and about one-fifth taller than the female. The head-and-body length is typically between 190 and 255 cm (75 and 100 in). Males reach about 117–140 cm (46–55 in) at the shoulder, while females are slightly shorter. Males typically weigh 235 kg (518 lb) and females 220 kg (490 lb). The tail is 40–75 cm (16–30 in) long, with a tuft at the end.

The sable antelope has a compact and robust build, characterized by a thick neck and tough skin. It has a well-developed and often upright mane on its neck, as well as a short mane on the throat. Its general colouration is rich chestnut to black. Females and juveniles are chestnut to dark brown, while males begin darkening and turn black after three years. However, in southern populations, females have a brown to black coat. Calves less than two months old are a light tan and show faint markings. The underparts, cheek, and chin are all white, creating a great contrast with the dark back and flanks. Long, white hairs are present below the eyes, and a wide, black stripe runs over the nose.

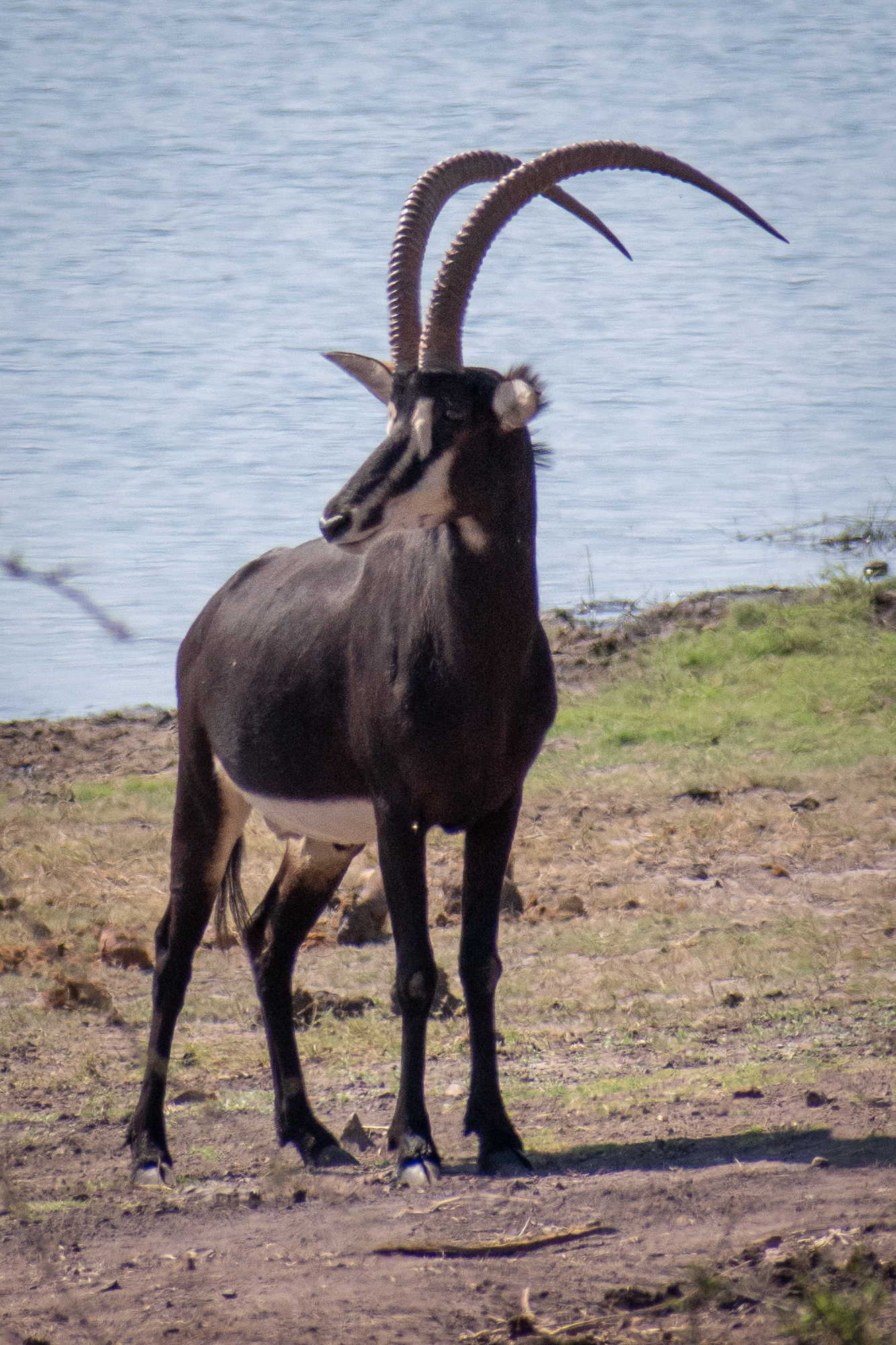
Adult male in Chobe National Park, Botswana

Both sexes have ringed horns which arch backwards. In females, these can reach 61–102 cm (24–40 in), while in males they are 81–165 cm (32–65 in) long. The average lifespan of the sable antelope is 19 years in the wild and 22 years in captivity.

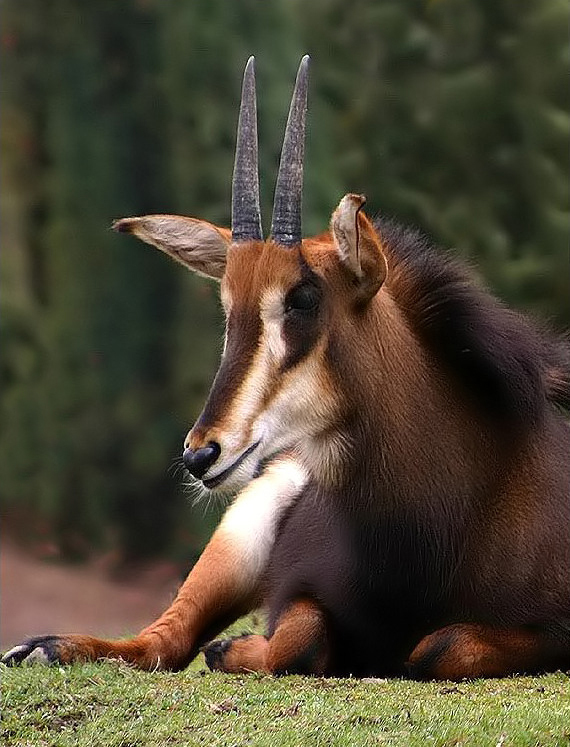
Juvenile animal in captivity

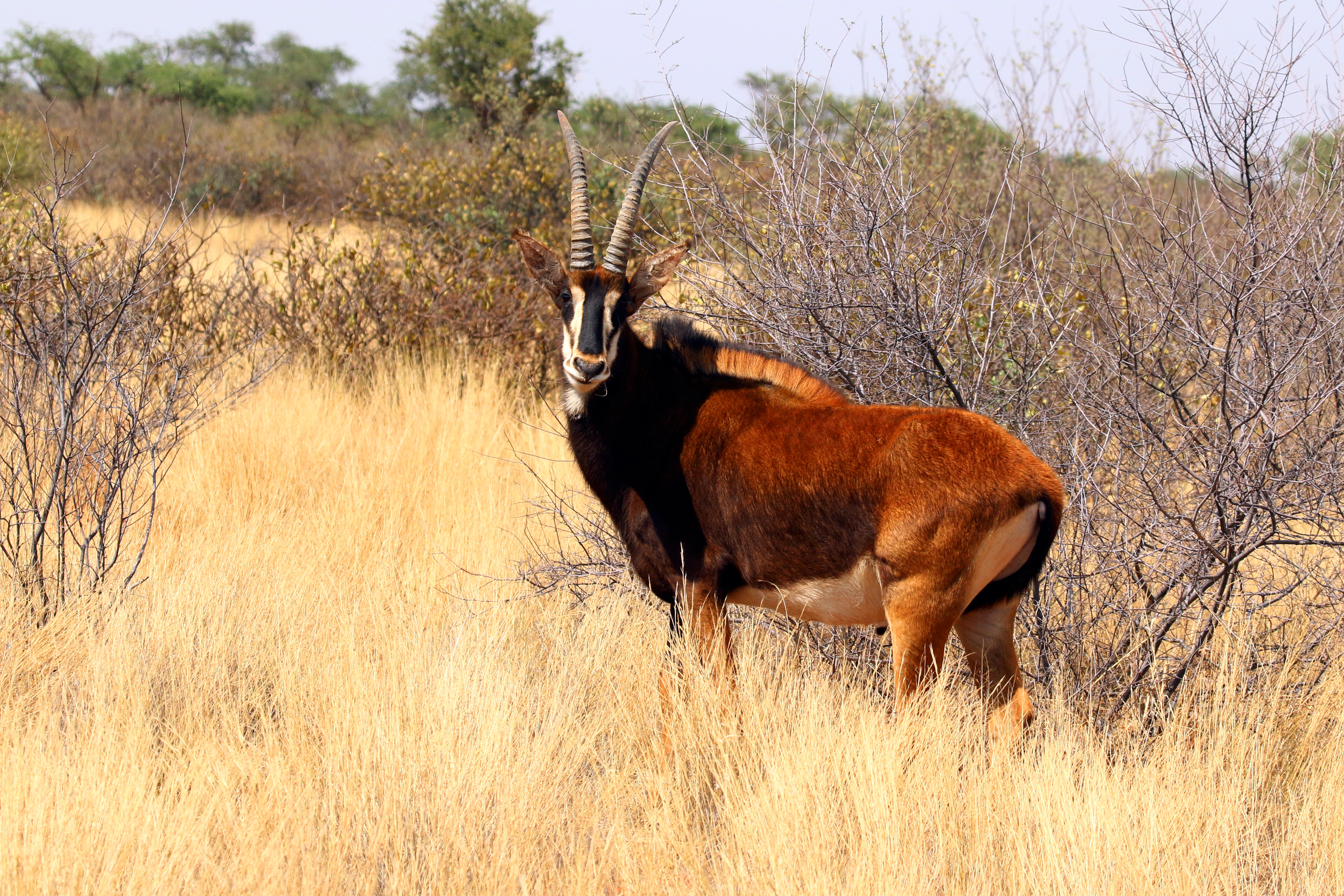
Young bull at Tswalu Kalahari Reserve, South Africa

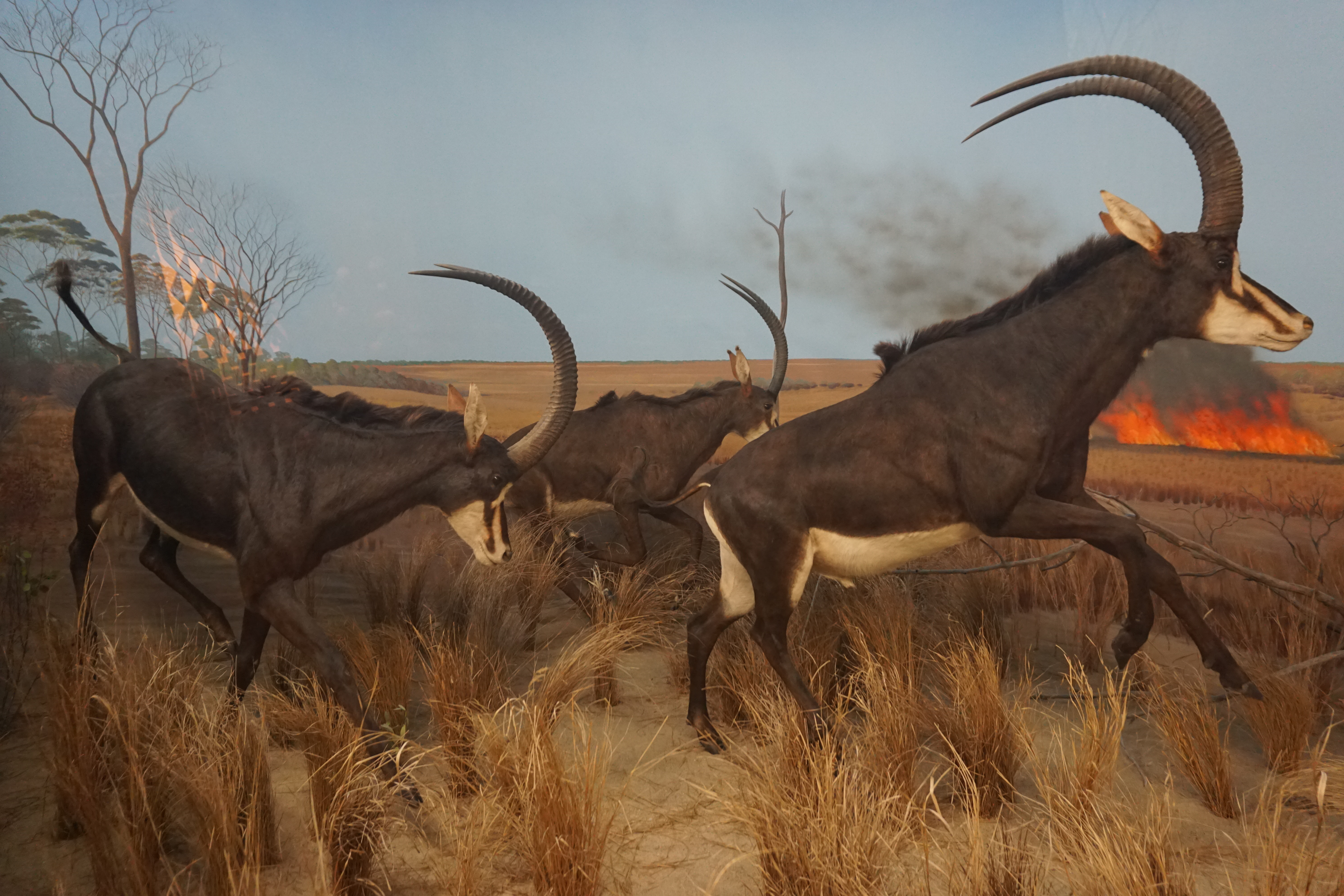
The Wooded Savanna: Sable diorama at the Milwaukee Public Museum

== Behavior ==
Sable antelopes live in savanna woodlands and grasslands during the dry season, where they eat mid-length grasses and leaves. They visit salt licks and have been known to chew bones to collect minerals. They are diurnal, but are less active during the heat of the day. They form herds of 10 to 30 females and calves led by a single male, called a bull. Males fight among themselves; they drop to their knees and use their horns.

In each herd, the juvenile males are exiled from the herd around 3 years old. All of the female calves remain, however. When the herd gets too large, it divides into smaller groups of cows and their young. These groups form new herds, once again with only one adult bull. The young males, which have been separated from the herd, associate in "bachelor groups" of up to 12 individuals. Among the bachelors, the most dominant is the first individual to join a new group of females when the position is open. Seldom, during their fights for dominance, they are able to inflict bodily harm to any contenders.

When sable antelopes are threatened by predators, including lions, they confront their attackers and fight-back aggressively. Using their scimitar-shaped horns that can reach to its vulnerable rump area (which is generally preferred by predators), they can impale their enemy. There are instances where their predators have died during such fights. In the 1950 to 1970's the antelope's numbers were reduced severely by tsetse fly pest outbreaks.

The grassland habitat of the sable antelope is being reduced by habitat destruction for agricultural development. Sable antelope are important to their habitats as grazers and browsers. The young are important as prey for carnivores, such as lions, leopards, brown hyenas, African wild dogs, Nile crocodiles, Osborn's dwarf crocodiles, and Central African slender-snouted crocodiles.

=== Reproduction ===
The giant sable antelope's breeding season is seasonal and births coincide with the rainy season. After a gestation period of around 9 months, the female gives birth to a single young. A newborn calf is born with a sandy coloured coat, which helps it to camouflage. The calf will lie hidden away for at least 10 days while being nursed by its mother.

Young sable antelope are weaned at around 8 months and will become sexually mature at between 2 and 3 years. As the calf develops, its coat will darken and it will achieve its status within the herd. The life span of a giant sable antelope is around 17 years.

=== Diet ===
Sable antelopes are herbivores. They are specialized browsing animals that feed upon foliage, mid-length grasses (primarily Urochloa nigropedata), leaves and herbs, particularly those that grow on termite mounds. Tree leaves make up 90% of their diet. They are diurnal animals, meaning they are most active in the daylight, but less active during the hottest part of the day. Like other bovids, they also have a ruminant digestive system. Because water is essential to the sable antelope's survival, it travels every two to four days to drink at water sources. The sable antelope presumably decreases its risk of being eaten by predators by staying away from feeding areas with high numbers of other grazers, but at the cost of prolonged and strenuous journeys to water. Use of specific water sources in particular regions is related to the presence of calcium and magnesium salts in the water, allowing the antelope to consume large amounts of minerals while meeting their water needs.

== In culture ==
The Sable Antelope is featured on the Rhodesian flag and coat of arms. It is also depicted on the Coat of arms of the Federation of Rhodesia and Nyasaland. It is also the emblem of TAAG Angola Airlines.

The Zimbabwe rugby union national team is nicknamed after the sable antelope.

One subspecies, the giant sable antelope, is the national animal of Angola.

The animal and its subspecies features in several zoo games, such as Planet Zoo and the Zoo Tycoon franchise.
