= Hippotragus gigas =

Hippotragus gigas Temporal range: Late Pliocene - Early Pleistocene

Scientific classification
- Domain: Eukaryota
- Kingdom: Animalia
- Phylum: Chordata
- Class: Mammalia
- Order: Artiodactyla
- Family: Bovidae
- Subfamily: Hippotraginae
- Genus: Hippotragus
- Species: †H. gigas

Binomial name
- †Hippotragus gigas Leakey, 1965

Extinct species of bovid

Hippotragus gigas is an extinct species of antelope known from the Plio-Pleistocene of Africa.

== Taxonomy ==
Hippotragus gigas was discovered by Louis Leakey in 1965, who described it as "a Hippotragus of gigantic proportions". Fossils were first found in Bed II of the Olduvai Gorge in eastern Africa, and have also been found at sites in Algeria and South Africa.

== Description ==
Based on molar size, this species was slightly larger than its living relatives and would have weighed around 300 kg (660 lb). In addition to larger size, the molars can be distinguished by their rounded cusps, large basal pillars, rounded ribs and the large goat folds on lower molars. Its horn cores were also less mediolaterally compressed than its relatives. H. gigas also had a reduced premolar row compared to living Hippotragus species. This is a derived trait for the genus, which suggests that the living species are not descended from H. gigas.
