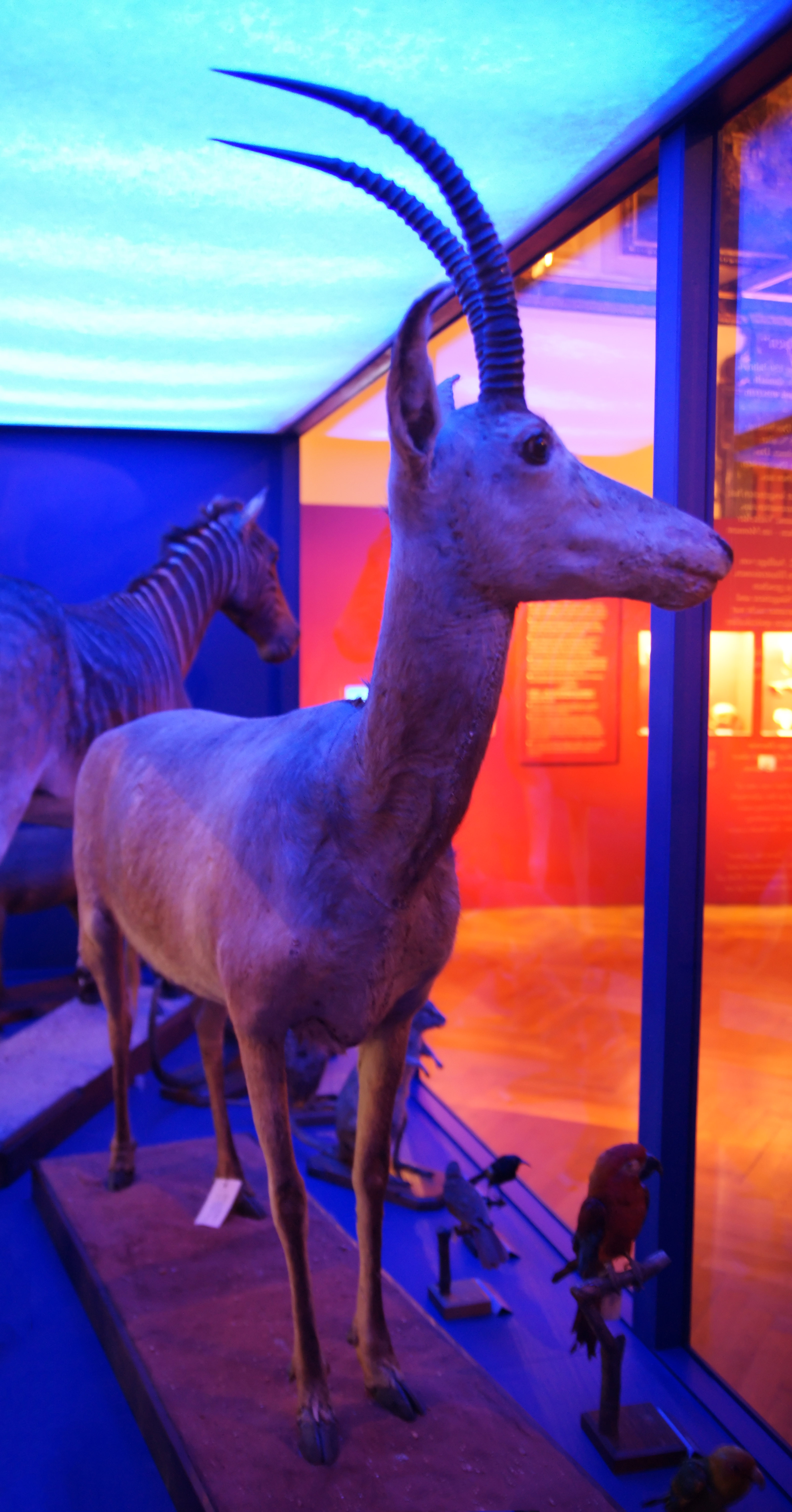
- One of four existing bluebuck skins, Vienna Museum of Natural History. The overall blue colouration is caused by the lighting.

Conservation status
- Extinct (1799 or 1800) (IUCN 3.1)

Scientific classification
- Kingdom: Animalia
- Phylum: Chordata
- Class: Mammalia
- Order: Artiodactyla
- Family: Bovidae
- Subfamily: Hippotraginae
- Genus: Hippotragus
- Species: †H. leucophaeus

Binomial name
- †Hippotragus leucophaeus (Pallas, 1766)
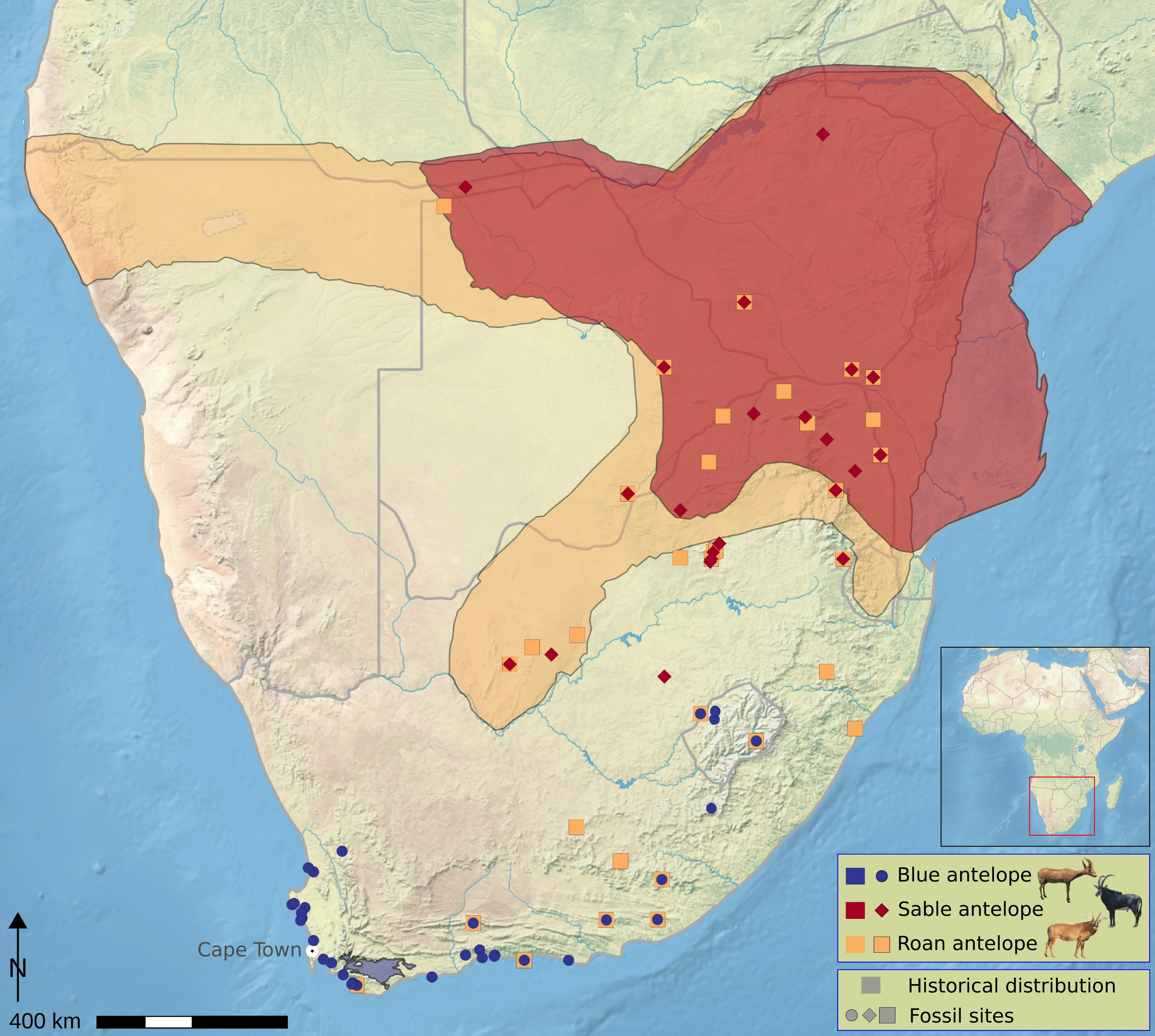
- Historical distribution and Holocene and Pleistocene fossil sites of bluebuck (blue), sable antelope (red), and roan antelope (yellow) in southern Africa

Synonyms
- List: Antilope leucophaeus (Pallas, 1766); Hippotragus capensis (P. L. S. Müller, 1776); Capra leucophaea (Thunberg, 1793); A. leucophaea (Lichtenstein, 1814); Bubalis leucophaea (Lichtenstein, 1814); Cemas glaucus (Oken, 1816); H. glauca (Oken, 1816); Cerophorus leucophaeus De Blainville, 1816; Oryx leucophaeus De Blainville, 1816; Egocerus leucophaea (Desmarest, 1822)

= Bluebuck =

Bluebuck Temporal range: Late Pleistocene – Holocene

Extinct species of South African antelope

The bluebuck (Afrikaans: bloubok /ˈblaʊbɒk/) or blue antelope (Hippotragus leucophaeus) is an extinct species of antelope that lived in South Africa until around 1800. It was smaller than the other two species in its genus Hippotragus, the roan antelope and sable antelope. The bluebuck was sometimes considered a subspecies of the roan antelope, but a genetic study has confirmed it as a distinct species.

The largest mounted bluebuck specimen is 119 centimetres (47 in) tall at the withers. Its horns measure 56.5 centimetres (22.2 in) along the curve. The coat was a uniform bluish-grey, with a pale whitish belly. The forehead was brown, darker than the face. Its mane was not as developed as in the roan and sable antelopes; its ears were shorter and blunter, not tipped with black; and it had a darker tail tuft and smaller teeth. It also lacked the contrasting black and white patterns seen on the heads of its relatives. The bluebuck was a grazer, and may have calved where rainfall, and thus the availability of grasses, would peak. The bluebuck was confined to the southwestern Cape when encountered by Europeans, but fossil evidence and rock paintings show that it originally had a larger distribution.

During the Late Pleistocene, the bluebuck was common across South Africa, but by the time Europeans encountered the bluebuck in the 17th century, it was already uncommon, perhaps due to its preferred grassland habitat having been reduced to a 4,300-square-kilometre (1,700 sq mi) range, mainly along the southern coast of South Africa. Sea level changes during the early Holocene may also have contributed to its decline by disrupting the population, and it appears that it may have adapted for a low effective population size. The first published mention of the bluebuck is from 1681, and few descriptions of the animal were written while it existed. The few 18th-century illustrations appear to have been based on stuffed specimens. Hunted by European settlers, the bluebuck became extinct around 1800; it was the first historically recorded species of large African mammal to face extinction. Only four mounted skins remain, in museums in Leiden, Stockholm, Vienna, and Paris, along with horns and possible bones in various museums.

== Taxonomy ==
According to German zoologist Erna Mohr's 1967 book about the bluebuck, the 1719 account of the Cape of Good Hope published by the traveler Peter Kolbe appears to be the first publication containing a mention of the species. Kolbe also included an illustration, which Mohr believed was based on memory and notes. In 1975, Husson and Holthuis examined the original Dutch version of Kolbe's book and concluded that the illustration did not depict a bluebuck, but rather a greater kudu (Tragelaphus strepsiceros), and that the error was due to a mistranslation into German. The first published illustration of the bluebuck is therefore instead a depiction of a horn from 1764. It has also been pointed out that the animal had already been mentioned (as "blaue Böcke") on a list of South African mammals in 1681.

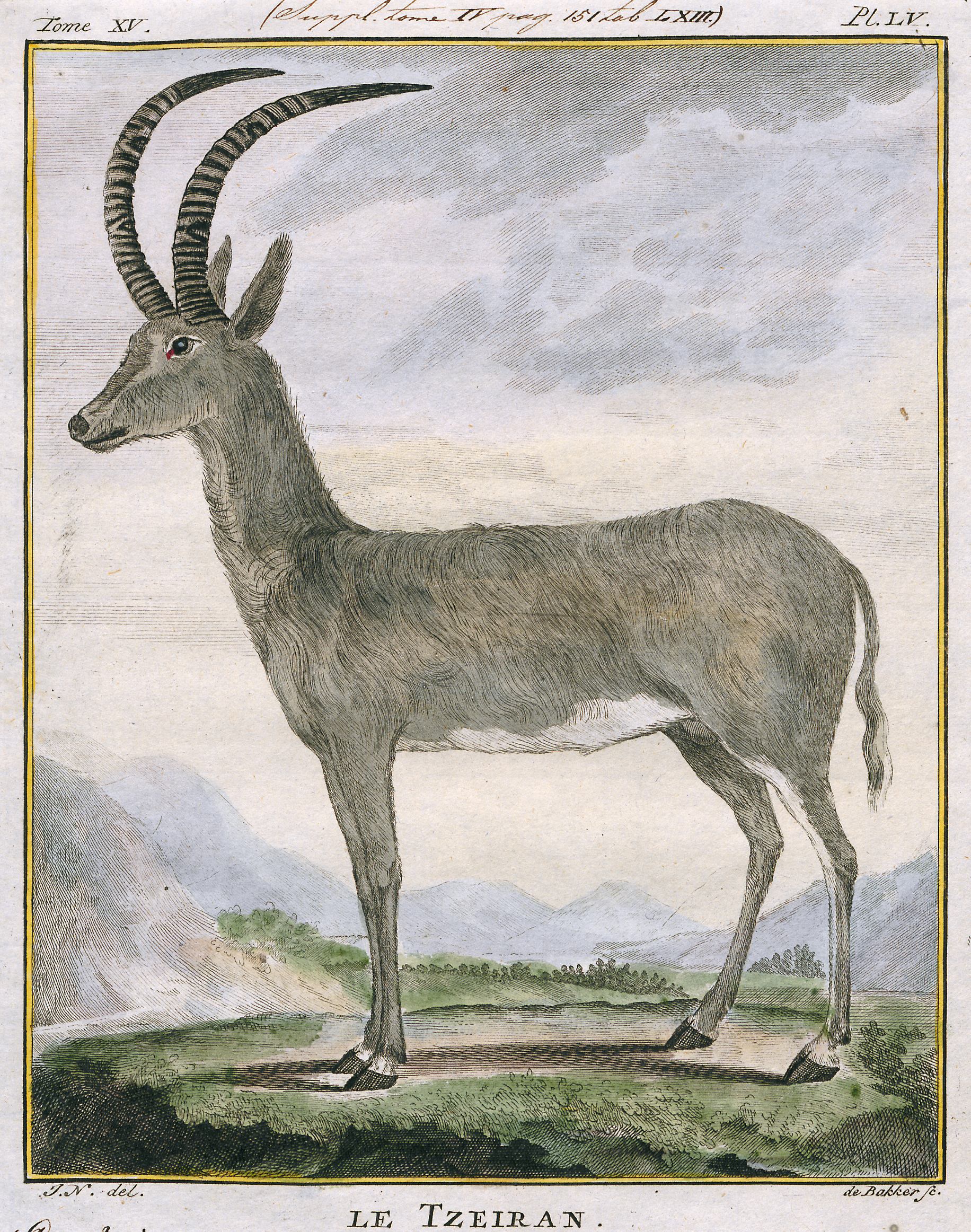
1778 illustration by Allamand, probably based on the type specimen in Leiden

The Welsh naturalist Thomas Pennant made the next published illustration, and included an account of the antelope, calling it "blue goat", in his 1771 Synopsis of Quadrupeds, based on a skin from the Cape of Good Hope purchased from Amsterdam. In 1778, a drawing by the Swiss-Dutch natural philosopher Jean-Nicolas-Sébastien Allamand was included in Comte de Buffon's Histoire Naturelle; he called the antelope tzeiran, the Siberian name for the goitered gazelle (Gazella subgutturosa). The illustration is widely believed to be based on the specimen in Leiden. This drawing is the first published illustration that shows the entire animal. Another record of the bluebuck appears in the travel memoirs of French explorer François Levaillant, published in the 1780s, describing his quest to discover the land to the east of the Cape of Good Hope, "Hottentots Holland". The German zoologist Martin Lichtenstein wrote about the bluebuck in 1812, but the species was mentioned less frequently in subsequent literature.

In 1776, the German zoologist Peter Simon Pallas formally described the bluebuck as Antilope leucophaeus. In 1853, the Dutch zoologist Coenraad Jacob Temminck stated that the type specimen was an adult male skin now in the Naturalis Biodiversity Center in Leiden (formerly Rijksmuseum van Natuurlijke Historie), collected in Swellendam and present in Haarlem before 1776. It has been questioned whether this was actually the type specimen, but in 1969, the Dutch zoologists Antonius M. Husson and Lipke Holthuis selected it as the lectotype of a syntype series, as Pallas may have based his description on multiple specimens.

In 1846, the Swedish zoologist Carl Jakob Sundevall moved the bluebuck and its closest relatives to the genus Hippotragus; he had originally named this genus for the roan antelope (H. equinus) in 1845. This revision was commonly accepted by other writers, such as the British zoologists Philip Sclater and Oldfield Thomas, who restricted the genus Antilope to the blackbuck (A. cervicapra) in 1899. In 1914, the name Hippotragus was submitted for conservation (so older, unused genus names could be suppressed) to the International Commission on Zoological Nomenclature (ICZN) with the bluebuck as the type species. However, the original 1845 naming of the genus with the roan antelope as a single species was overlooked and later suppressed by the ICZN, leading to some taxonomic confusion. In 2001, the British ecologist Peter J. Grubb proposed that the ICZN should rescind its suppression of the 1845 naming and make the roan antelope the type species of Hippotragus, since too little is known about the bluebuck for it to be a reliable type species. This was accepted by the commission in 2003.

The common names "bluebuck" and "blue antelope" are English for the original Afrikaans name "blaubok" /ˈblaʊbɒk/. The name is a compound of blauw and bok ("male antelope" or "male goat"). Variants of this name include "blaawwbok" and "blawebock". The generic name Hippotragus is Greek for "horse-goat", while the specific name leucophaeus is a fusion of two Greek words: leukos ("white") and phaios ("brilliant").

=== Preserved specimens ===
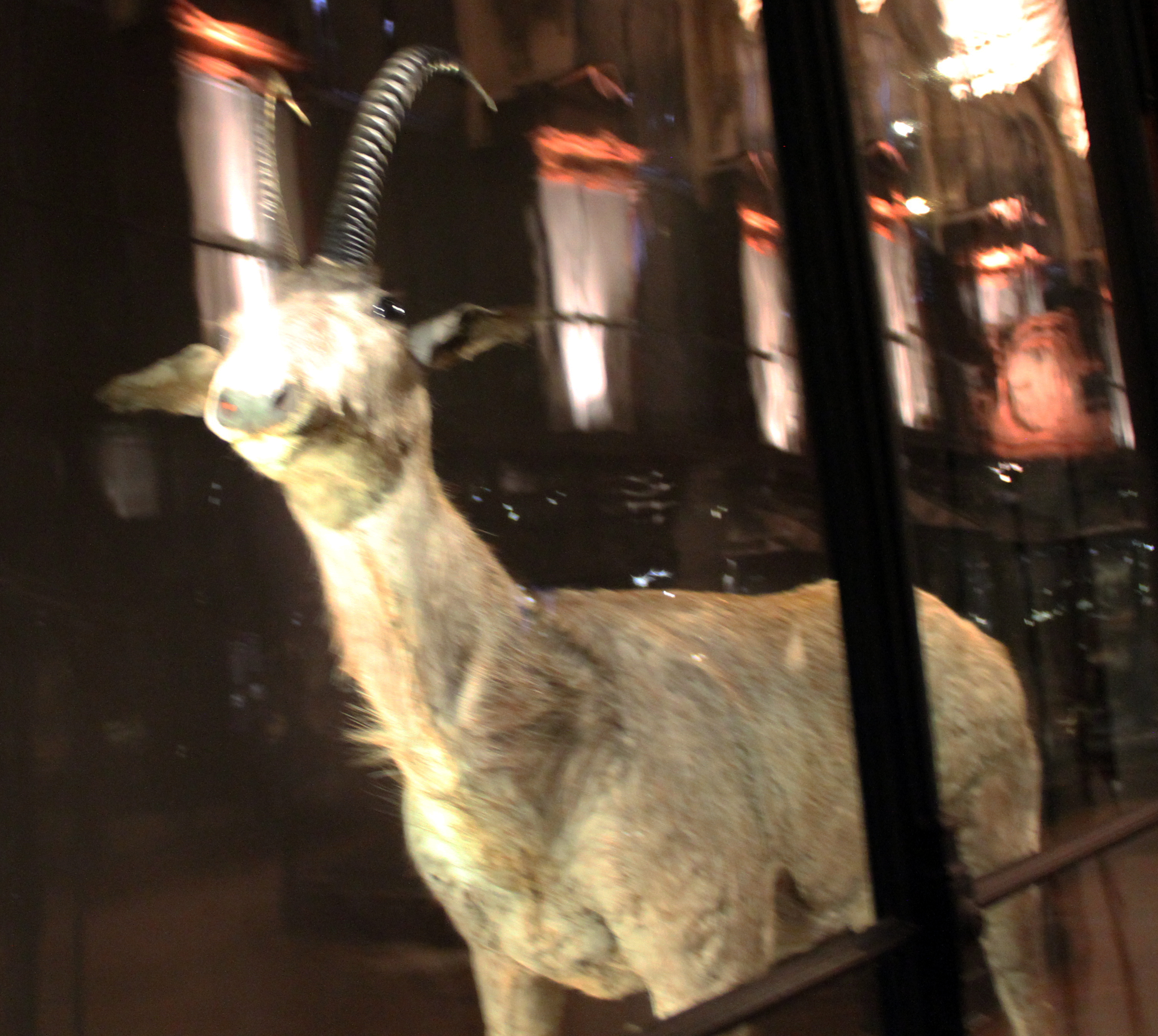
Skin in National Museum of Natural History, Paris

Four mounted skins of the bluebuck remain: the adult male in Leiden, a young male at the Zoological Museum of Stockholm, an adult female in the Vienna Museum of Natural History, and an adult male in the Museum of Natural History in Paris. A mounted skin was housed in the Zoological Museum in Uppsala until the 19th century, but now only the horns remain. There are also records of a skin in Haarlem, but its current whereabouts are unknown. Several of these skins have been identified in various 18th-century illustrations. Skeletal remains have been found in both archaeological and palaeontological contexts.

In 2021, the German geneticist Elisabeth Hempel and colleagues examined ten bluebuck specimens to resolve their identities, and found that only four of them were bluebucks. The skins in Stockholm and Vienna were confirmed as belonging to bluebucks, as were skull fragments in Leiden that may belong to the lectotype specimen, and the horns in Uppsala. Four assigned skulls (those in Glasgow, Leiden, Paris and Berlin) were shown to belong to either sable or roan antelopes, as were two pairs of horns (in Cape Town and St. Andrews). As a result, the bluebuck is rarer in museum collections than previously thought, and no complete skulls are known of the species. The researchers pointed out that there are four more potential specimens that could be confirmed through testing; two skulls in Berlin, a pair of horns in London, and either a skull or pair of horns in Brussels. In 2023, the pair of horns in London were confirmed by Hempel and colleagues to belong to a blue antelope using ancient DNA, but four other candidates were shown to be roan antelopes.

=== Evolution ===
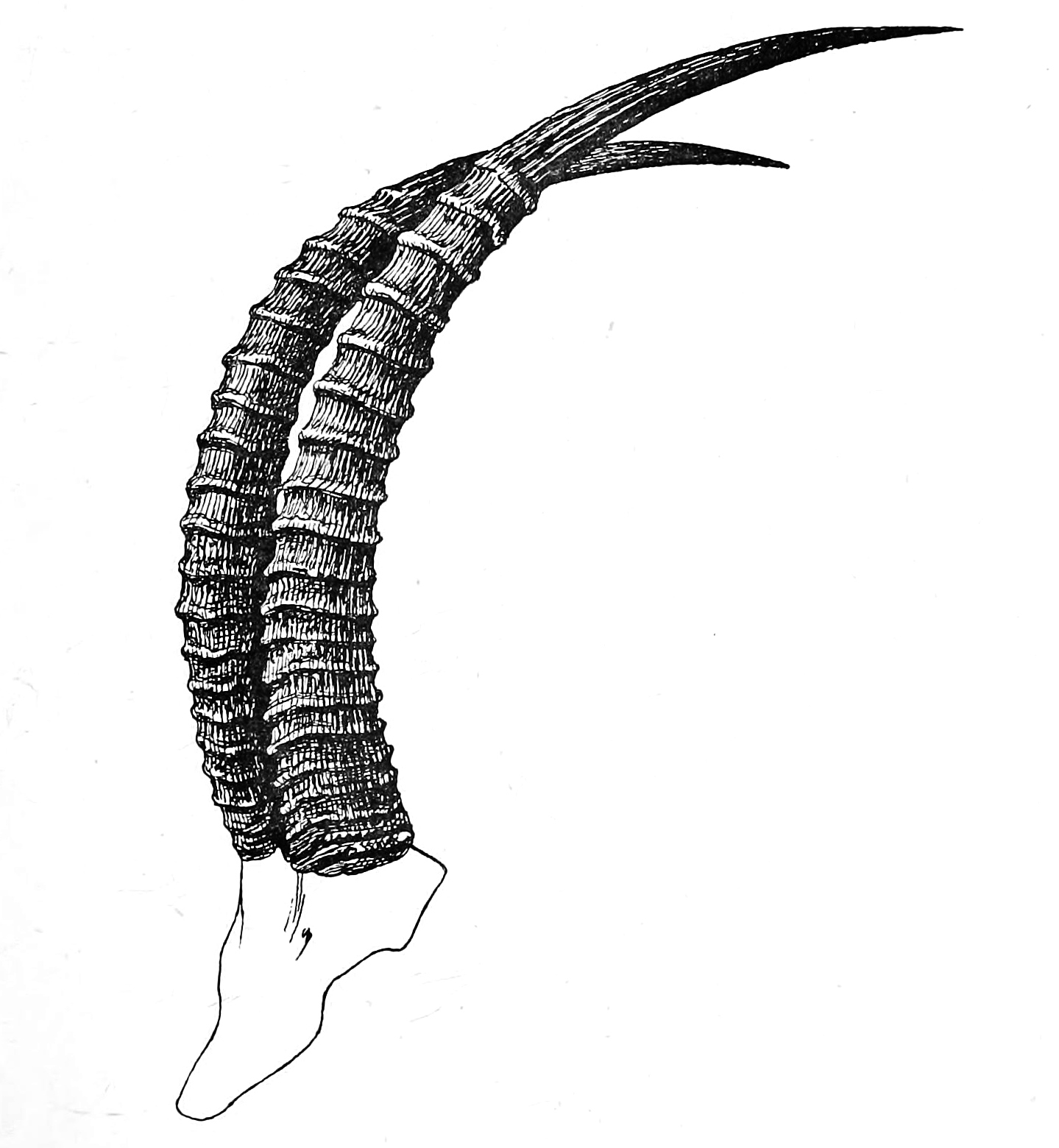
Horns in Natural History Museum, London

Based on studies of morphology, the bluebuck has historically been classified as either a distinct species or as a subspecies of the roan antelope. After its extinction, some 19th-century naturalists began to doubt its validity as a species, with some believing the museum specimens to be small or immature roan antelopes, and both species were lumped together under the name A. leucophaeus by the English zoologist George Robert Gray in 1821. The Austrian zoologist Franz Friedrich Kohl pointed out the distinct features of the bluebuck in 1866, followed by Sclater and Thomas, who rejected the synonymy in 1899. In 1974, the American biologist Richard G. Klein showed (based on fossils) that the bluebuck and roan antelope occurred sympatrically on the coastal plain of the southwestern Cape from Oakhurst to Uniondale during the early Holocene, supporting their status as separate species.

In 1996, an analysis of mitochondrial DNA extracted from the bluebuck specimen in Vienna by South African biologist Terence J. Robinson's and colleagues showed that it was outside the clade containing the roan and sable antelopes. The study therefore concluded that the bluebuck is a distinct species, and not merely a subspecies of the roan antelope as was supposed. In 2017, a reconstruction of the entire bluebuck mitogenome by Portuguese biologists Gonçalo Espregueira Themudo and Paula F. Campos, based on bone powder extracted from the horns in Uppsala, contradicted the 1996 results. This study instead placed the bluebuck as a sister species to the sable antelope, with the roan antelope as an outgroup. The bluebuck and sable antelope diverged from each other 2.8 million years ago, while the roan antelope diverged from both of them 4.17 million years ago. Africa was going through climatic oscillations between 3.5 and 2 million years ago, and during a colder period, the ancestors of the sable antelope and bluebuck may have been separated, and the population in southern Africa eventually became a new species.

The cladograms below shows the placement of the bluebuck according to the 1996 and 2017 DNA studies:

Robinson and colleagues, 1996:

- - - blesbok (Damaliscus pygargus phillipsi)
    - bontebok (D. p. pygarus)
  - Hippotragus
    - bluebuck (H. leucophaeus)
    - - roan antelope (H. equinus)
      - sable antelope (H. niger)

Themudo and Campos, 2017:

- Hippotraginae
  - - addax (Addax nasomaculatus)
    - oryxes (Oryx spp.)
  - - roan antelope (H. equinus)
    - - bluebuck (H. leucophaeus)
      - sable antelope (H. niger)

Based on their larger sample of specimens, Hempel and colleagues also found the bluebuck genetically closest to the sable antelope in 2021. This was confirmed by a 2022 study by Hempel and colleagues, which managed to sample DNA from a fossil bluebuck specimen for the first time, at 9,800–9,300 years old the oldest palaeogenome from Africa (the climate in South Africa is generally unfavourable to preserving ancient DNA).

== Description ==
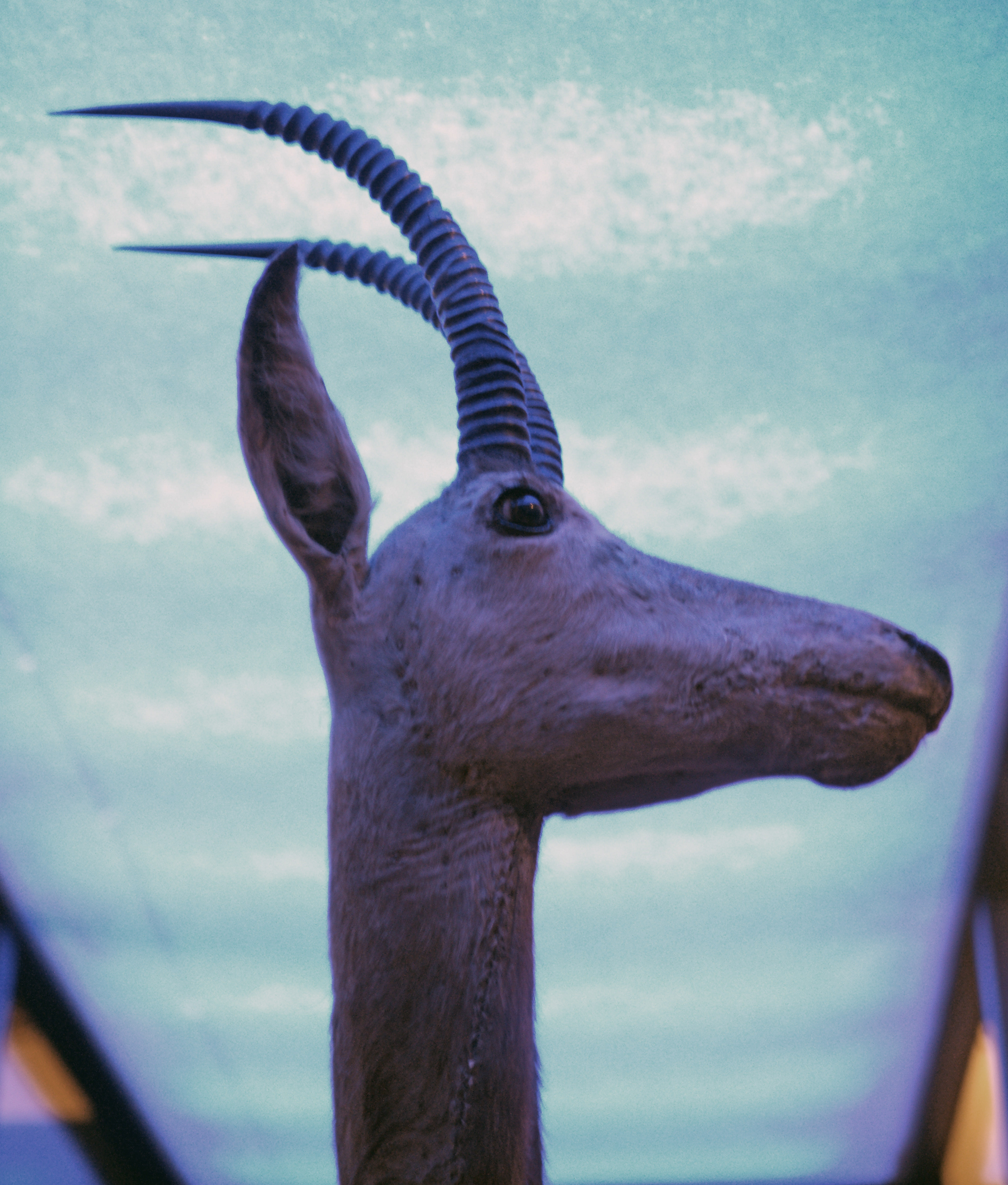
Head of the Vienna skin

The adult male bluebuck in Leiden is 119 centimetres (47 in) tall at the withers, and is possibly the largest known specimen. According to Sclater and Thomas, the tallest specimen is the one in Paris, a male that stands 110 centimetres (45 in) at the shoulder; the specimen in Vienna, on the other hand, is the shortest, a 100-centimetre (40 in) tall female. The bluebuck was notably smaller than the roan and sable antelopes, and therefore the smallest member of its genus.

The coat was a uniform bluish-grey, with a pale whitish belly, which was not contrasted on the flanks. The limbs had a faint dark line along their front surface. The forehead was brown, darker than the face, and the upper lip and patch in front of the eyes were lighter than the body. The neck-mane was directed forwards and not as developed as in the roan and sable antelopes, and the throat-mane was almost absent. Other differences between the bluebuck and its extant relatives included its shorter and blunter ears not tipped with black, a darker tail tuft (though little darker than its general colour), and smaller teeth. The bluebuck also lacked the contrasting black and white patterns seen on the heads of its relatives.

As the old skins are presumably faded, it may be difficult to reconstruct the original colour of the bluebuck from them. Pennant observed that the eyes had white patches below them and the underbelly was white; the coat was a "fine blue" in living specimens, while it changed to "bluish grey, with a mixture of white" in dead animals. He also suggested that the length of the bluebuck's hair and the morphology of its horns formed a link between antelopes and goat. He went on to describe the ears as pointed and over 23 centimetres (9 in) long and the tail as 18 centimetres (7 in) long, terminating in a 6 centimetres (2.4 in) long tuft.

The horns of the bluebuck were significantly shorter and thinner than those of the roan antelope, but perhaps proportionally longer. The horns of the Leiden specimen measure 56.5 centimetres (22.2 in) along the curve. Pennant gave the horn length as 51 centimetres (20 in). He added that the horns, sharp and curving backward, consist of twenty rings. The horns of the bluebuck appear to have hollow pedicles (bony structures from which the horns emerge).

== Behaviour and ecology ==
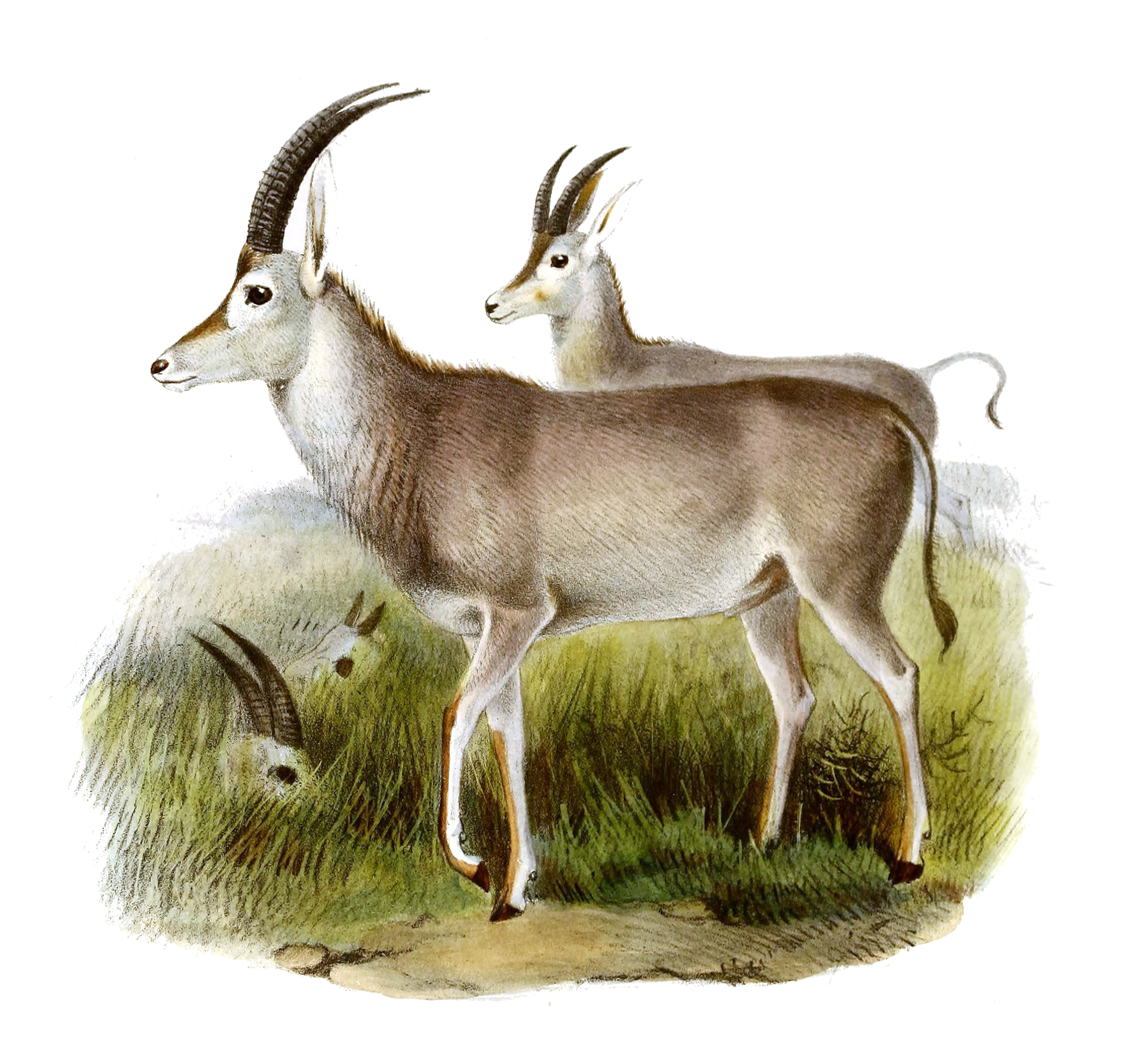
Illustration of a male and female (background), by Smit and Wolf, from before 1899; the image may be based on the Paris skin, and the neck-mane is perhaps depicted as too long.

The bluebuck, as Klein puts it, became extinct before "qualified scientists could make observations on live specimens". According to historical accounts, the bluebuck formed groups of up to 20 individuals. Similarities to the roan and the sable antelopes in terms of dental morphology make it highly probable that the bluebuck was predominantly a selective grazer, and fed mainly on grasses. The row of premolars was longer than in others of the genus, implying the presence of dicots in the diet. A 2013 study by the U.S. paleontologist J. Tyler Faith and colleagues noted the scarcity of morphological evidence to show that the bluebuck could have survived the summers in the western margin of the Cape Floristic Region (CFR), when the grasses are neither palatable nor nutritious. This might have induced a west-to-east migration, because the eastern margin receives rainfall throughout the year while precipitation in the western margin is limited to winter.

An 18th-century account suggests that females might have left their newborn calves in isolation and returned regularly to suckle them until the calves were old enough to join herds, which is similar to the behaviour of roan and sable antelopes. Akin to other grazing antelopes, the bluebuck probably calved mainly where rainfall, and thus the availability of grasses, peaked. Such locations could be the western margin of the CFR during winter and the eastern margin of the CFR during summer. Faith and colleagues found that the occurrence of juveniles in bluebuck fossils decreases linearly from the west to the east, indicating that most births took place in the western CFR; due to the preference for rainfall, it may be further assumed that most births occurred during winter, when the western CFR receives most of its rainfall. The annual west-to-east migration would have followed in summer, consistent with the greater number of older juveniles in the east that would have joined herds. Juvenile fossils also occur in other places across the range, but appear to be concentrated in the western CFR.

== Distribution and habitat ==
Endemic to South Africa, the bluebuck was confined to the southwestern Cape. A 2003 study estimated the expanse of the historic range of the bluebuck at 4,300 square kilometres (1,700 sq mi), mainly along the southern coast of South Africa; fossils, however, have been discovered in a broader area that includes the southern and western CFR and even the highlands of Lesotho. Historical records give a rough estimate of its range. On 20 January 1774, Swedish naturalist Carl Peter Thunberg recorded a sighting in Tigerhoek, Mpumalanga. In March or April 1783, Levaillant claimed to have witnessed two specimens in Soetemelksvlei, Western Cape. Based on these notes, a 2009 study by the South African zoologist Graham I. H. Kerley and colleagues estimated the range of the bluebuck to be limited within a triangular area in the Western Cape, bounded by Caledon to the west, Swellendam to the northeast and Bredasdorp to the south. Rock paintings in the Caledon river valley of the Free State province in eastern South Africa have been identified as bluebucks, which also confirms the once wider distribution of the species.

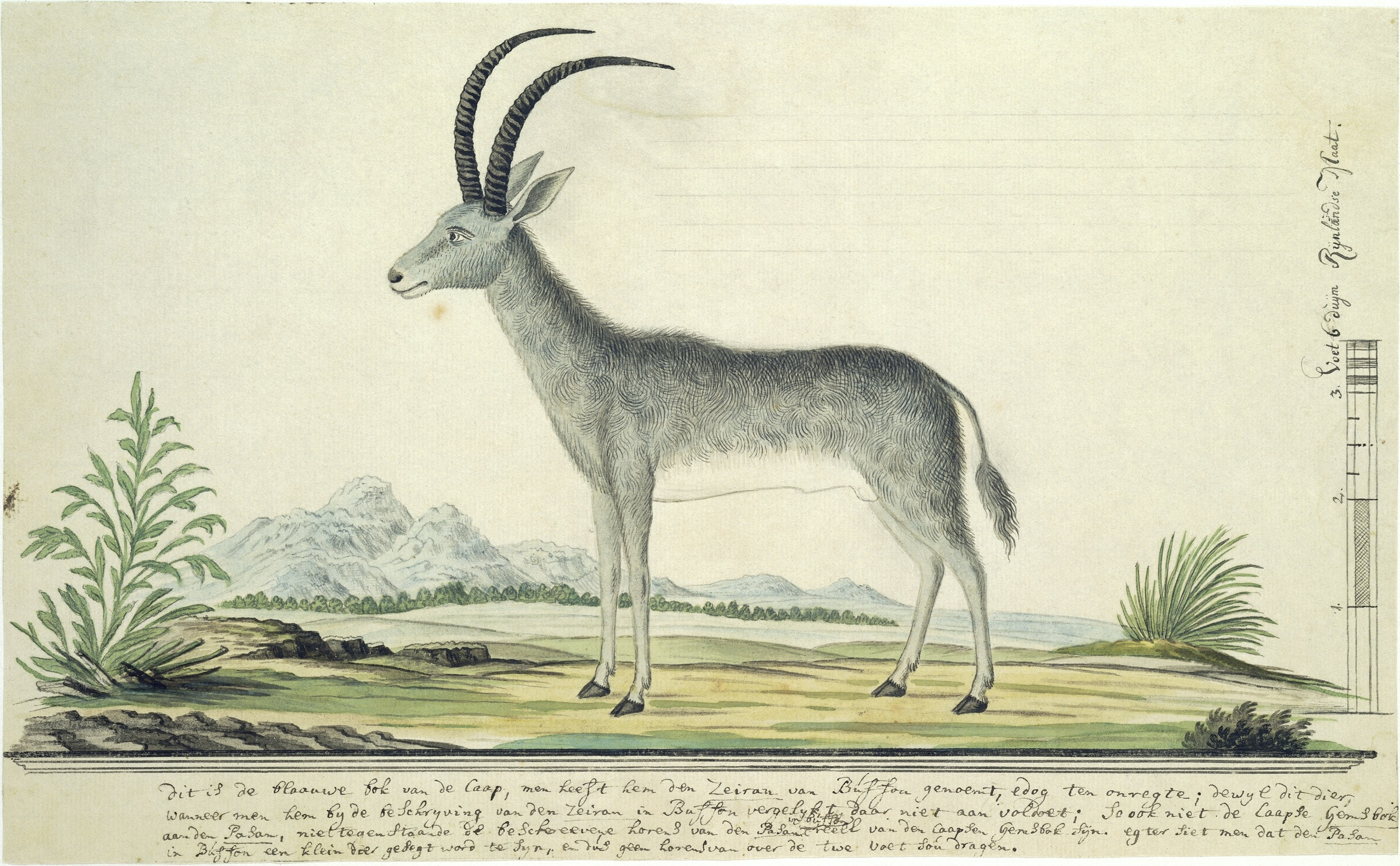
Late 1700s illustration by Gordon, possibly showing the Paris skin

In 1974, Klein studied the fossils of Hippotragus species in South Africa. Most of these were found to represent the bluebuck and the roan antelope. The fossil record suggested that the bluebuck occurred in large numbers during the last glacial period (nearly 0.1 million years ago), and was more common than sympatric antelopes. The bluebuck could adapt to more open habitats than could the roan antelope, a notable point of difference between these species. Fossils of the bluebuck have been found in the Klaises River and the Nelson Bay Cave (near Plettenberg Bay) and Swartklip (to the west of the Hottentots Holland mountains). Faith and colleagues noted that the western and southern CFR were separated by biogeographical barriers, such as the Cape Fold Belt and afromontane forests.

A 2011 study suggested that low sea levels facilitated migrations for large mammals; therefore the rise in sea levels with the beginning of the Holocene would have led to fragmented bluebuck populations and distanced many populations from the western coast (fossils dating to this period are scarce in the western coast but have been recorded from the southern coast). Thus, a mass extinction could have taken place, leaving behind mainly the populations that remained in the resource-rich western CFR. The causes of the drastic decline in bluebuck populations just before the 15th and 16th centuries have not been investigated; competition with livestock and habitat deterioration could have been major factors in its depletion.

Faith and colleagues further suggested that the bluebuck, being a grazer, probably favoured grassland habitats. This hypothesis is supported by fossil evidence – bluebuck fossils appear in significant numbers along with those of grassland antelopes. Kerley and colleagues suggested that the bluebuck frequented grasslands and shunned wooded areas and thickets. In a 1976 study of fossils in the Southern Cape, Klein observed that the bluebuck's habitat preferences were similar to those of the African buffalo (Syncerus caffer) and the reedbucks (Redunca).

== Relationship with humans ==
=== Extinction ===
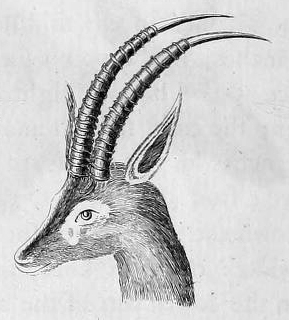
Head by Pennant, 1771, the second published illustration of this species

Due to the small range of the bluebuck at the time of European settlement of the Cape region in the 17th and 18th centuries compared to the much wider area evidenced by fossil remains, it is thought the species was already in decline before this time. The bluebuck was the sole species of Hippotragus in the region until 70,000–35,000 years ago, but the roan antelope appears to have become predominant about 11,000 years ago. According to Robertson and colleagues in 1996, this might have coincided with grasslands being replaced by, for example, brush and forest, thereby reducing what is presumed to be the preferred habitat of the bluebuck, the grasslands.

Faith and colleagues stated in 2013 that the results of the sea level changes in the early Holocene may also have played a role in the decline of the species, and left only the southern population to survive into historical times. Hempel and colleagues found a low level of genetic diversity between the four confirmed bluebuck specimens in 2021, which confirms its population size was low by the time of European colonisation. In 2022, Hempel and colleagues demonstrated that there had been ancient gene flow from the roan into the blue antelope, and that the genomic diversity was much lower in the latter. This indicates the species was already vulnerable due to low population size in at least the early Holocene due to habitat loss and range fragmentation, and the impact of colonial-era humans was probably the decisive factor that led to its extinction. While there is no doubt that European colonisation was the deciding factor in the demise of the bluebuck, Hempel and colleagues determined in 2024 that for at least 400,000 years, bluebuck populations had become adapted to low effective population size, exhibiting inbreeding avoidance. Bluebuck genomes evinced high genetic purging, and even seemed unaffected by glacial cycles and changes in habitat size.

Dutch newsreel about taxidermy from 1978 showing the Leiden specimen

The bluebuck was hunted to extinction by European settlers; in 1774 Thunberg noted that it was becoming increasingly rare. The German biologist Hinrich Lichtenstein claimed that the last bluebuck had been shot in 1799 or 1800. The bluebuck was the first historically recorded species of large African mammal to become extinct. Around the time of its extinction, the bluebuck occurred in what would be known as the Overberg region (Western Cape), probably concentrated in Swellendam. In 1990, the South African zoologist Brian D. Colohan argued that an 1853 eyewitness report of a "bastard gemsbok" seen near Bethlehem, Free State, actually referred to a bluebuck, 50 years after the last individuals in Swellendam were shot. The IUCN Red List accepts Lichtenstein's dates of extinction. The related roan and sable antelopes have also disappeared from much of their former range.

=== Cultural significance ===
The bluebuck rock paintings from the Caledon river valley have been attributed to Bushmen. They show six antelopes facing a man, and were supposedly inspired by shamanic trance; they may depict a Bushman visiting the spirit-world through a tunnel. The Bushmen possibly believed that the bluebuck had a supernatural potency, like other animals in their environment. The animals in the paintings are similar in proportion to the reedbuck, but the large ears, horns, and lack of a mane rule out species other than the bluebuck.

A South African fable, The Story of the Hare, mentions a bluebuck (referred to as inputi) that, among other animals, is appointed to guard a kraal. The bluebuck is also mentioned in French novelist Jules Verne's Five Weeks in a Balloon (1863); the animal is described as a "superb animal of a pale-bluish colour shading upon the gray, but with the belly and the insides of the legs as white as the driven snow".
