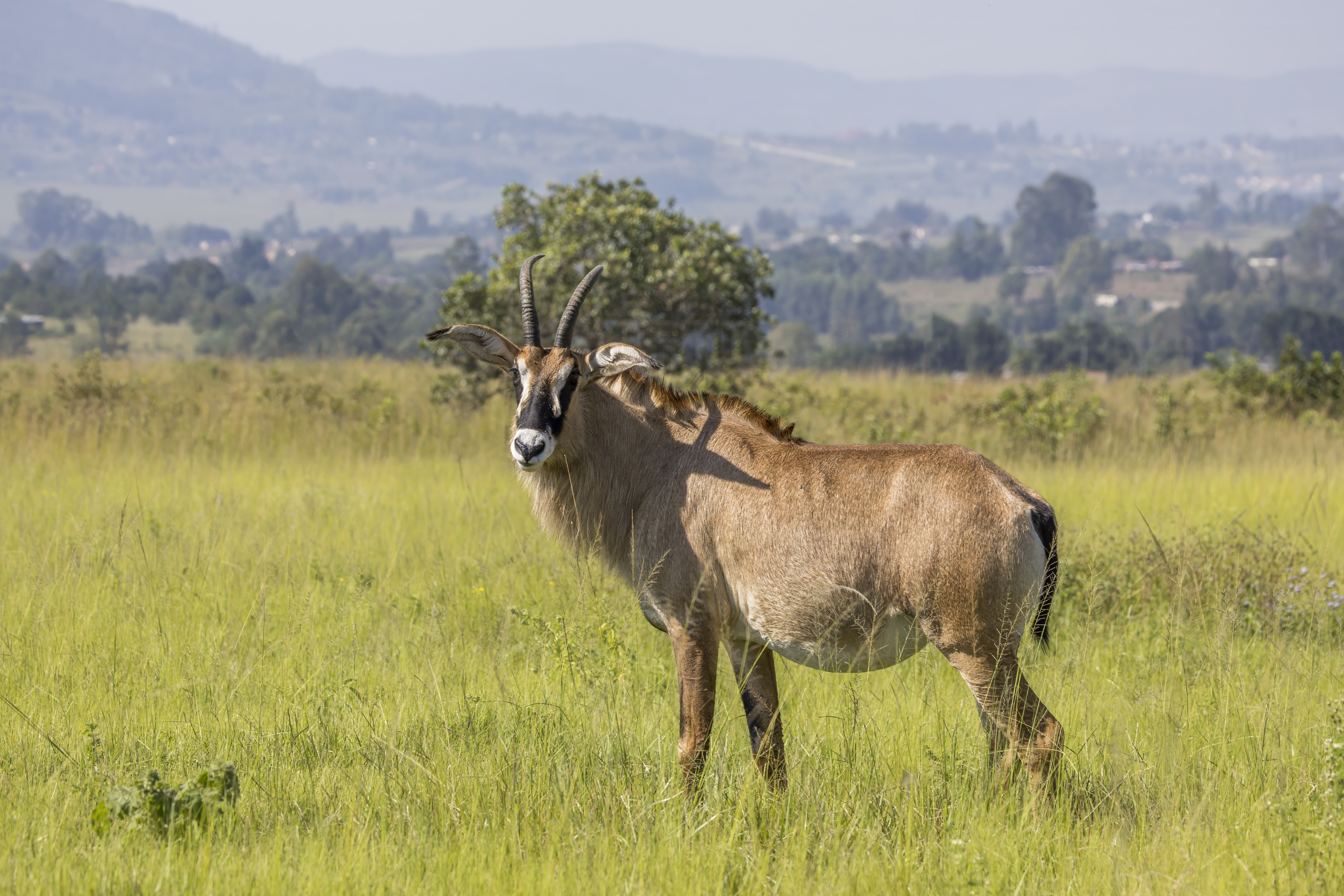
- H. e. equinus, Eswatini
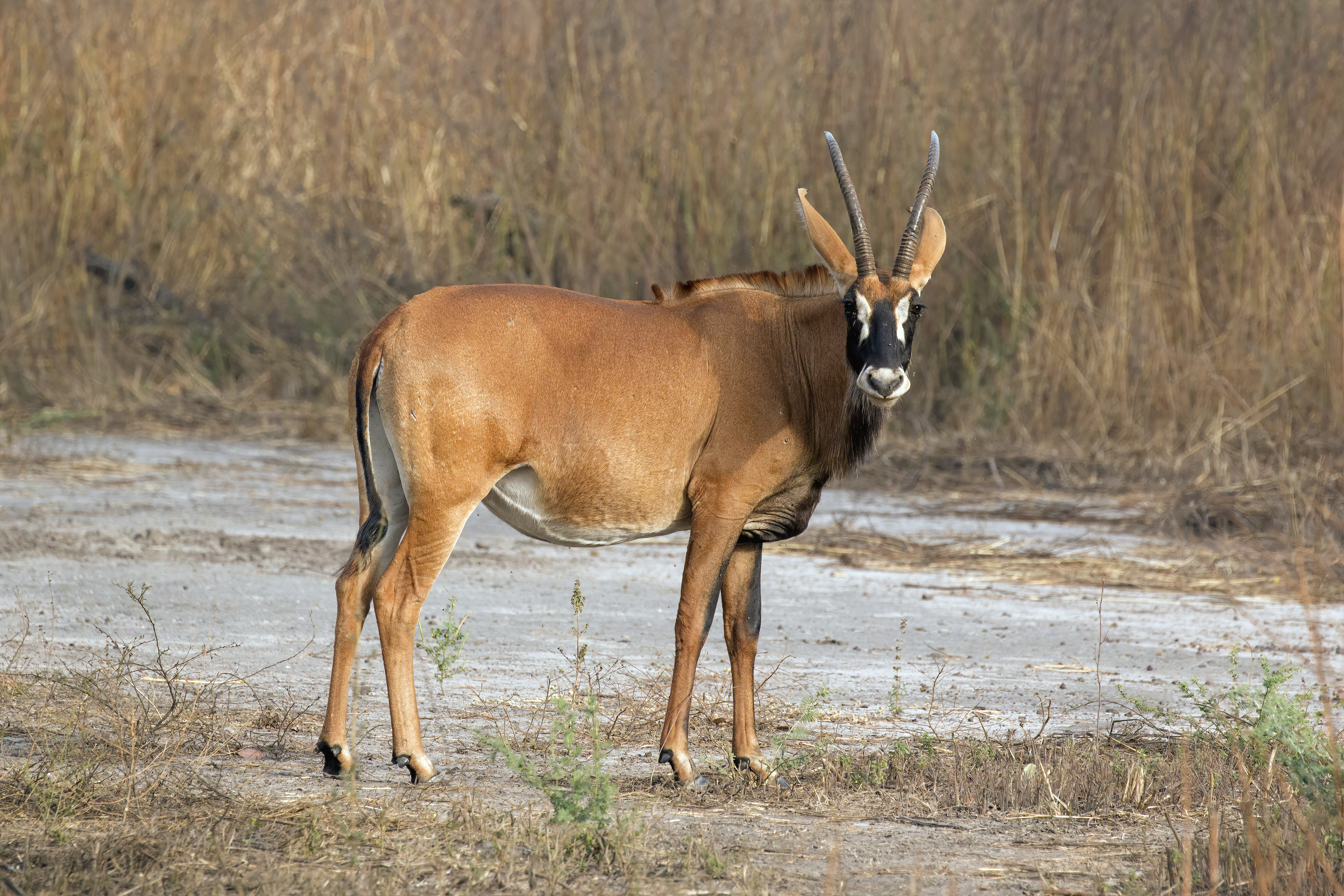
- H. e. koba, Senegal

Conservation status
- Least Concern (IUCN 3.1)

Scientific classification
- Kingdom: Animalia
- Phylum: Chordata
- Class: Mammalia
- Order: Artiodactyla
- Family: Bovidae
- Subfamily: Hippotraginae
- Genus: Hippotragus
- Species: H. equinus

Binomial name
- Hippotragus equinus (É. Geoffroy, 1803)
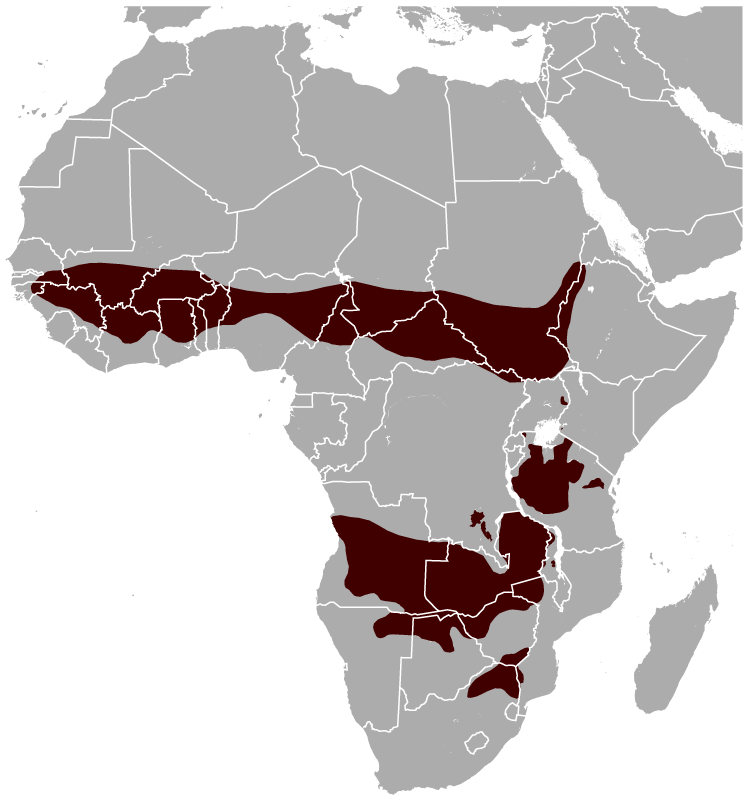
- range

Synonyms
- List: Antilope equina É. Geoffroy Saint-Hilaire, 1803; H. aethiopica (Schinz, 1821); H. aurita (C. H. Smith, 1827); H. barbata (C. H. Smith, 1827); H. docoi Gray, 1872; H. dogetti de Beaux, 1921; H. gambianus Sclater and Thomas, 1899; H. jubata (Goldfuss, 1824); H. rufopallidus Neumann, 1899; H. truteri (J. B. Fischer, 1829); H. typicus Sclater and Thomas, 1899

= Roan antelope =

Species of mammal

The roan antelope (Hippotragus equinus) is a large, savanna-dwelling antelope found in Western, Southern, and parts of Central and Eastern Africa. Named for its roan colour (a slightly reddish, sandy-brown), it has a lighter-toned underbelly and a (mostly) white face and snout, but with a black "mask" around the eyes and on the bridge of the snout, being somewhat lighter in females. Additionally, a pair of formidable, recurved horns (made of keratin-covered bone) are present on the heads of both males and females, albeit larger on the males, growing up to 100 cm (39 in) long. Males and females have short, erect, mohawk-like manes running down their back and very light, shaggy neckbeards, both of which are more pronounced in males. Both mane and neckbeard are tinted with darker tips, which run the length of the animal's back and belly, ending in a dark-coloured tail. The ears are long, erect, and donkey-like.

The roan is among the world's largest antelopes, after the elands (Taurotragus sp.) and the nilgai (Boselaphus tragocamelus), measuring 190–240 cm (75–94 in) from the head to the base of the tail, with a 37–48 cm (15–19 in)-long tail. Males weigh upwards of 242–300 kg (534–661 lb) and females 223–280 kg (492–617 lb), with a shoulder height of around 130–140 cm (51–55 in).

== Taxonomy and evolution ==
The roan antelope shares the genus Hippotragus with the extinct bluebuck (H. leucophaeus) and the sable antelope (H. niger), and is a member of the family Bovidae. It was first described by French naturalist Étienne Geoffroy Saint-Hilaire in 1803. The specific epithet equinus derives from the Latin equus ("horse-like"), referring to the horse-like appearance of this antelope.

In 1996, an analysis of mitochondrial DNA extracted from a mounted specimen of the bluebuck found that it was outside the clade containing the roan and sable antelopes. The study therefore concluded that the bluebuck is a distinct species, and not merely a subspecies of the roan antelope. The cladogram below shows the position of the roan antelope among its relatives, following the 1996 analysis:

- - - blesbok (Damaliscus pygargus phillipsi)
    - bontebok (Damaliscus pygargus pygarus)
  - - bluebuck (Hippotragus leucophaeus)†extinct
    - - roan antelope (Hippotragus equinus)
      - sable antelope (Hippotragus niger)

In 1974, palaeoanthropologist Richard Klein studied the fossils of Hippotragus species in South Africa. Most of these were found to represent the bluebuck and the roan antelope. The roan antelope seems to have appeared in the Nelson Bay Cave region following climatic changes in the Holocene.

=== Subspecies ===
Six subspecies are recognised:

- H. e. bakeri (Heuglin, 1863): Occurs in Sudan (East Africa).
- H. e. cottoni Dollman and Burlace, 1928: Occurs in Angola, Botswana, the southern Democratic Republic of the Congo, central and northern Malawi, and Zambia (Southern Africa).
- H. e. equinus É. Geoffroy Saint-Hilaire, 1803: Occurs in Mozambique, South Africa and Zimbabwe (Southern Africa).
- H. e. koba (Gray, 1872): Range extends from Senegal to Benin (West Africa).
- H. e. langheldi Matschie, 1898: Occurs in Burundi, the northern Democratic Republic of the Congo, Ethiopia, Kenya, Rwanda, South Sudan, Tanzania and Uganda (East Africa).
- H. e. scharicus (Schwarz, 1913): Occurs in Cameroon, the Central African Republic, Chad and eastern Nigeria (Central Africa).

The 6 subspecies were described in 1971 on the basis of morphology instead of genetics. As a result, the validity of the subspecies have been questioned by scientists. Since then, there have been attempts to determine their validity through genetic analysis, but these have been insufficient at resolving the uncertainty.

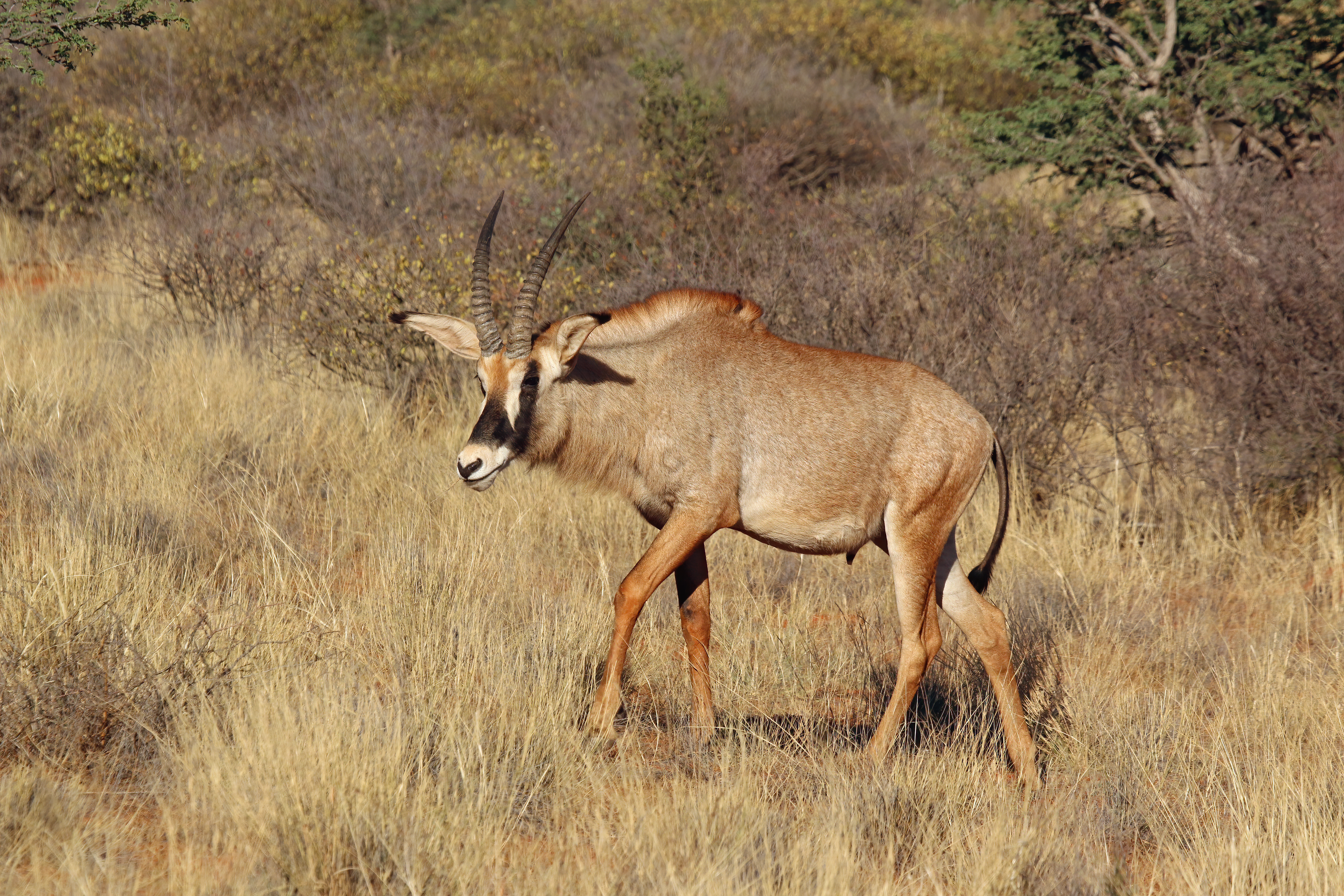
H. e. equinus, South Africa

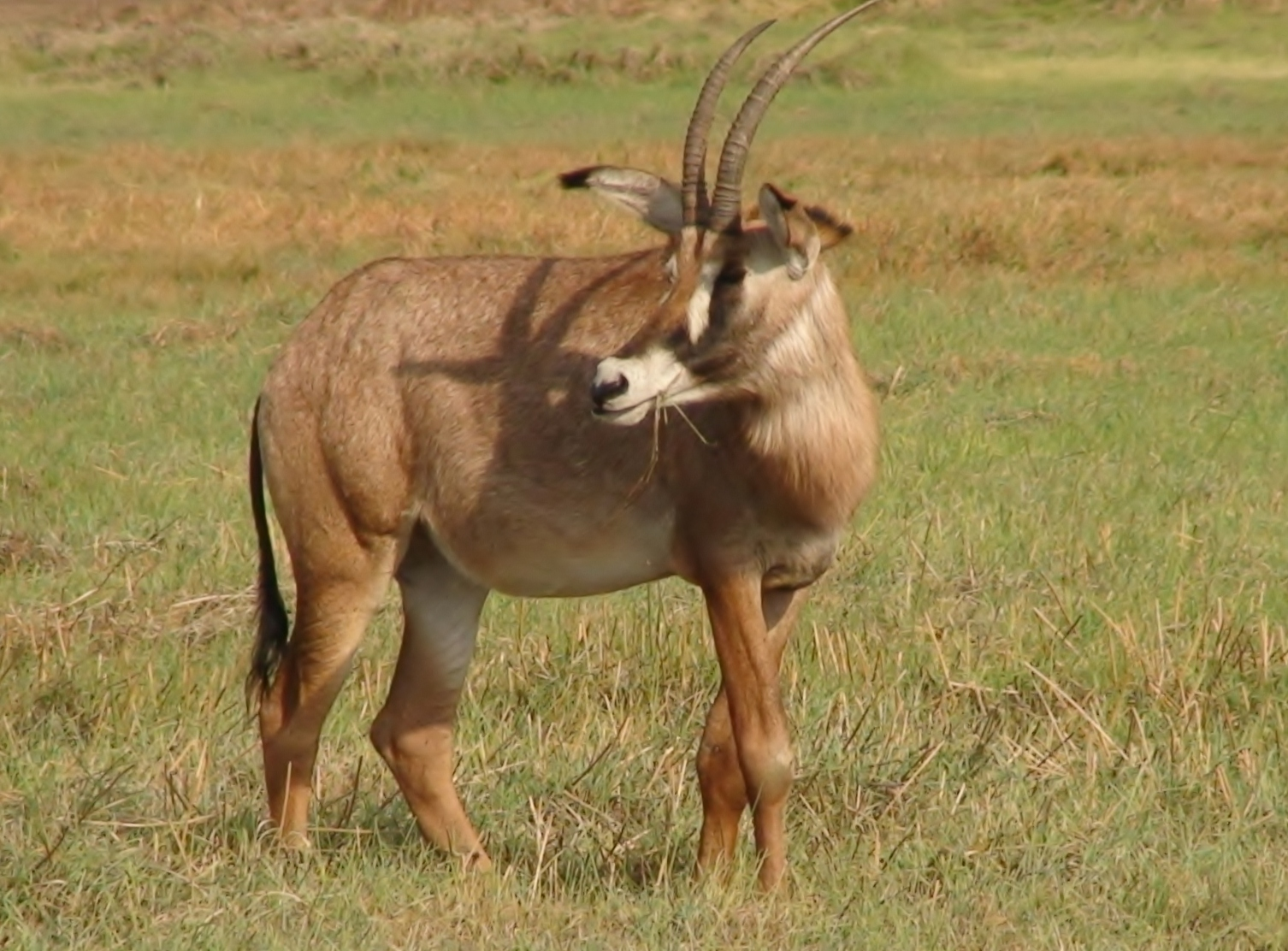
H. e. cottoni, Zambia

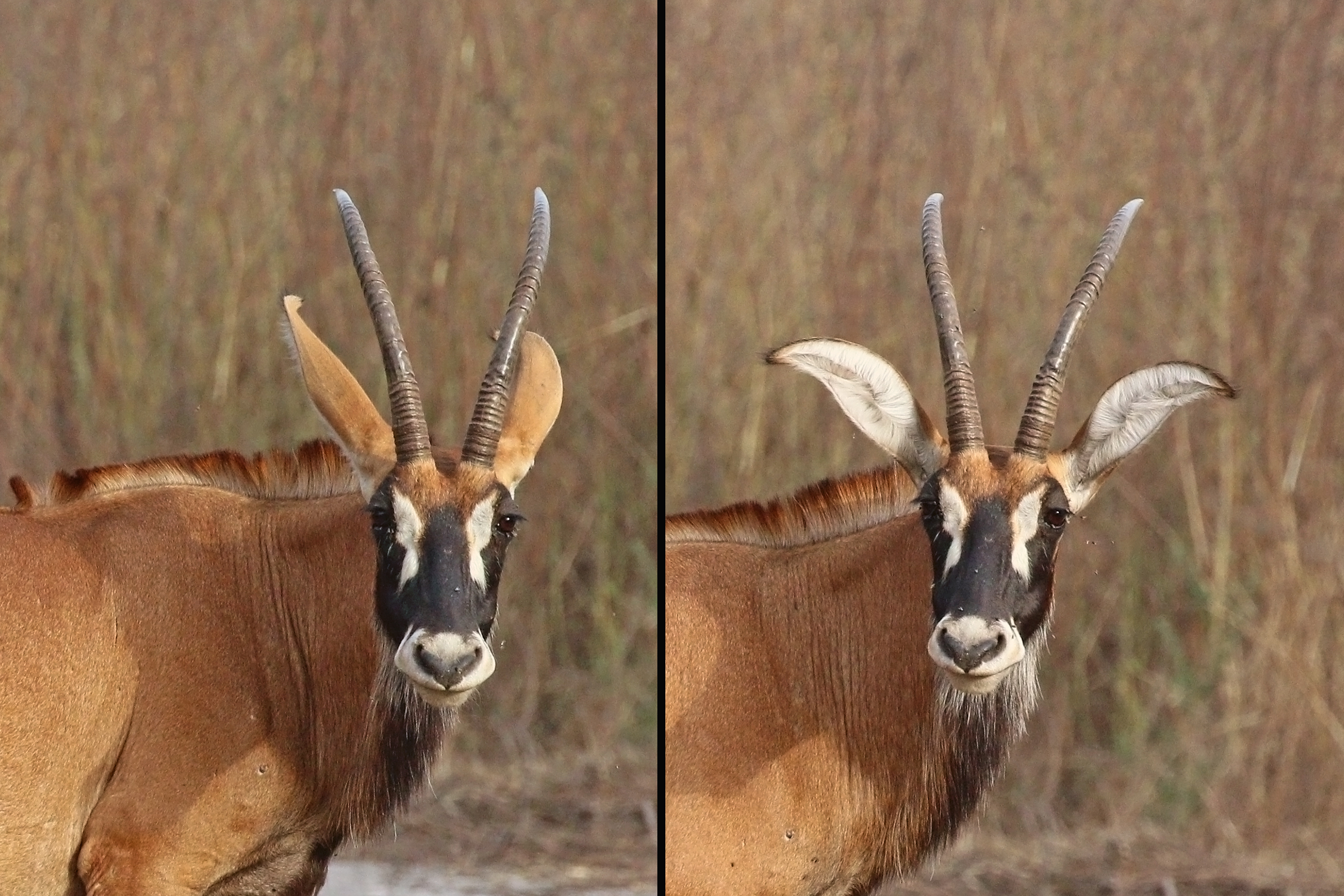
H. e. koba showing both sides of ears, Senegal

== Description ==
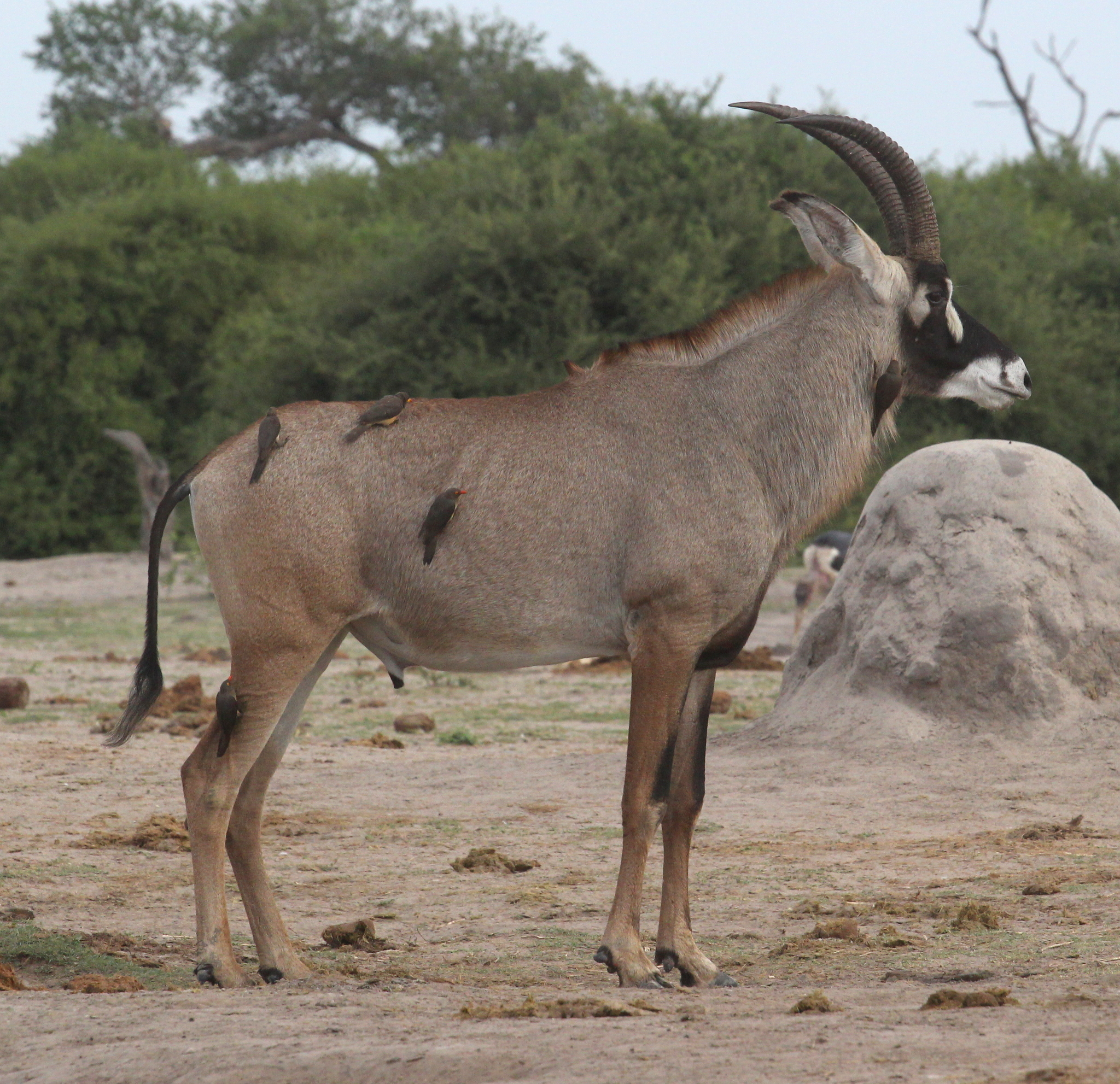
H. e. equinus in Botswana, with red-billed and yellow-billed oxpeckers

The roan antelope is a large antelope with a horse-like build. It is the largest antelope in the genus Hippotragus, and one of the largest species of antelopes in the world. Only elands, bongos and large male greater kudus can exceed them in weight on average. The roan antelope stands 135–160 centimetres (53–63 in) at the shoulder, and weighs 230–320 kilograms (510–710 pounds). The head-and-body length is typically between 235 and 285 centimetres (93 and 112 inches). The dark tail, terminating in a black tuft, measures up to 54 cm (21 in).

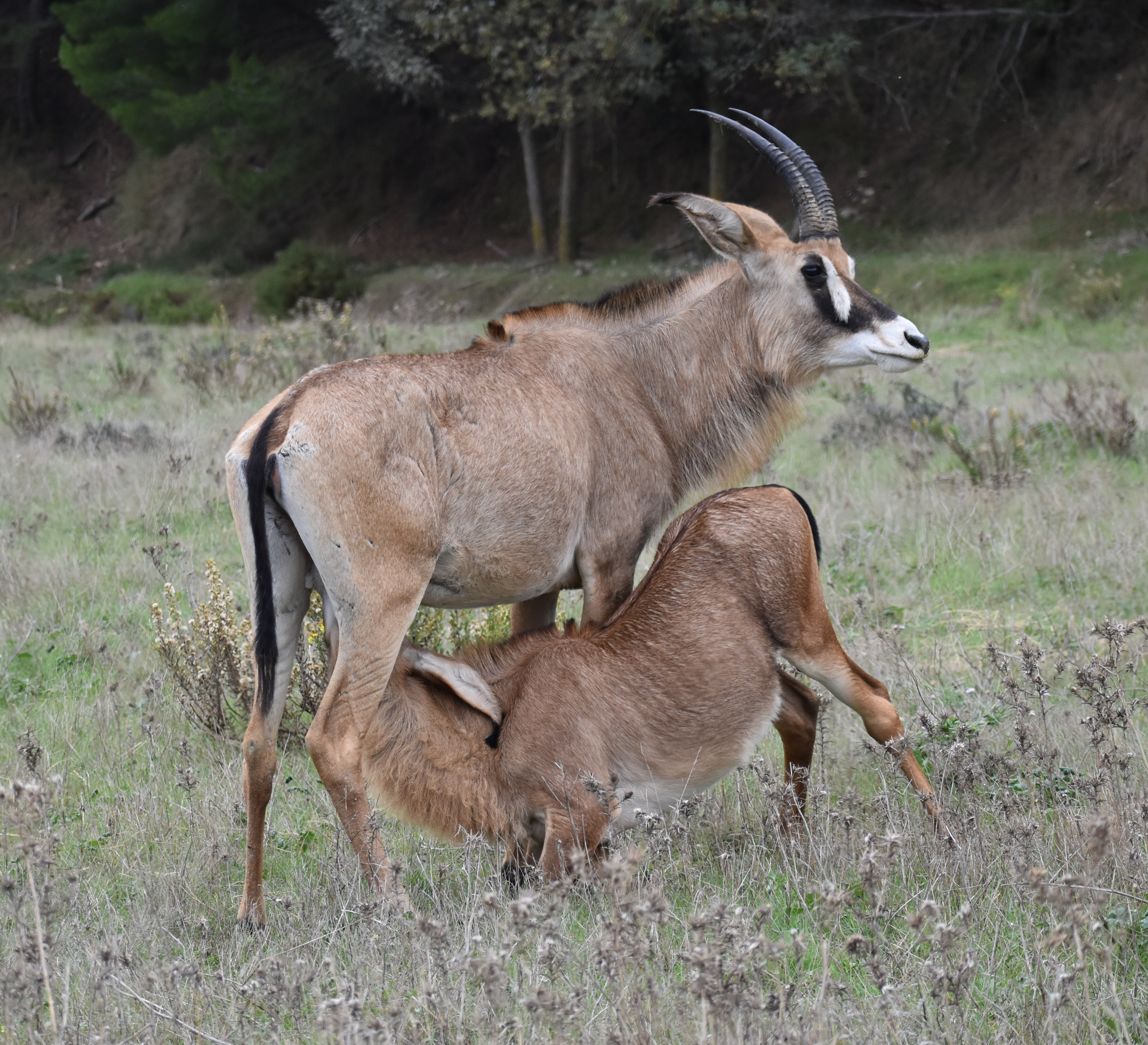
Calf nursing

Characteristic features include a short, erect mane of grayish brown hair extending from the back of the neck along the midline of the back up to the withers, white patches around the eyes and the mouth on the otherwise black face, and long, narrow ears with 3–5 cm (1.2–2.0 in) long tufts. The horns are ringed and arched backwards, which can reach 100 cm (39 in) long in males, slightly shorter in females. The long legs are supported by large hooves. The short, smooth coat is brown to amber. The ventral parts are yellow to white, while the neck and the manes are gray to black.

They are somewhat similar in appearance to the sable antelopes and can be confused where their ranges overlap. Sable antelope males are notably darker, being brownish-black rather than dark brown.

== Ecology ==
Roan antelopes can be found in woodland, grassland, and savannah; mainly in the tropical and subtropical grasslands, savannas, and shrublands biome, which range in tree density from forest with a grassy understory (such as the central Zambezian Miombo woodlands) to grasslands dotted with few trees, where they eat mid-length grasses.

They live in small groups and form harem groups of 5 to 15 animals with one dominant male. Males commonly fight among themselves for dominance of their herd, brandishing their horns while both animals are on their knees.

Roan antelopes are known to hybridise with sable antelopes in overlaps of the two distributions. Hybridisation occurred due to the wartime poaching depleting both populations.
