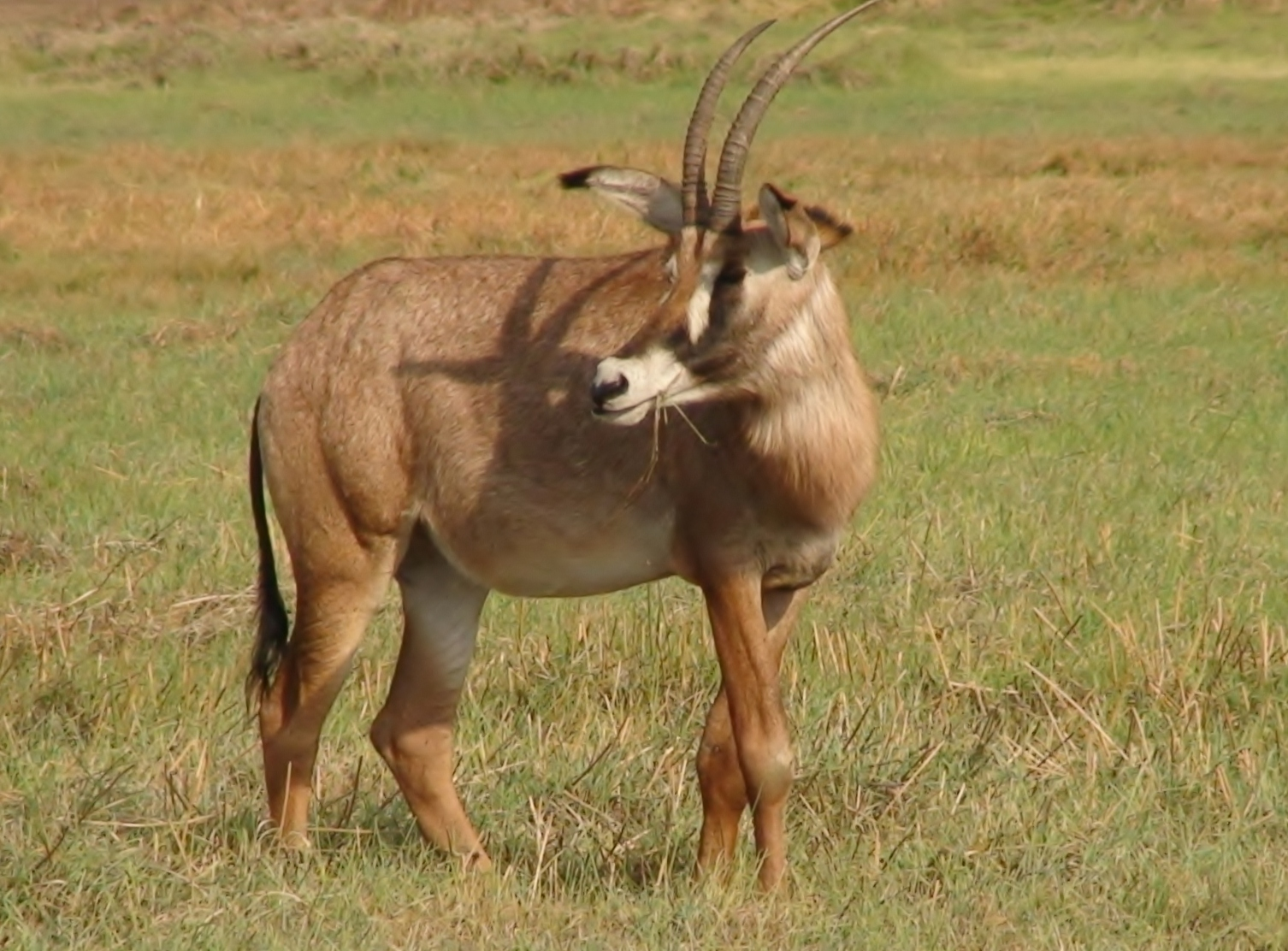
- Roan antelope, Hippotragus equinus

Scientific classification
- Kingdom: Animalia
- Phylum: Chordata
- Class: Mammalia
- Order: Artiodactyla
- Family: Bovidae
- Subfamily: Hippotraginae
- Genus: Hippotragus; Sundevall, 1845

Type species
- Antilope equina É. Geoffroy Saint-Hilaire, 1803

Species
- H. equinus; H. niger; †Hippotragus cookei?; †Hippotragus gigas; †H. leucophaeus

= Hippotragus =

Hippotragus Temporal range: Late Pliocene - Present

Genus of mammals

Hippotragus /hɪˈpɒtrəɡəs/ is a genus of antelopes which includes two living and one recently extinct species, as well as some fossil relatives. The genus name comes from Ancient Greek ἵππος (híppos), meaning "horse", and τράγος (trágos), meaning "he-goat", and thus, "horse goat".

Image	Scientific name	Common name	Distribution
	H. equinus	Roan antelope	West, Central, East and Southern Africa
	H. niger	Sable antelope	East Africa, south of Kenya, and Southern Africa
	H. leucophaeus	†Bluebuck or blue antelope	the southwestern Cape of South Africa

Fossil species

- †Hippotragus gigas
- †Hippotragus cookei? - may be a nomen dubium
